= Van Egmont =

Van Egmont is a surname. Notable people with the surname include:

- Anna van Egmont (1533–1558), Princess of Orange
- Floris van Egmont (c. 1470–1539), Dutch noble
- Justus van Egmont (1602–1674), Dutch painter and tapestry designer

== See also ==
- Van Egmond
