= Alessandro Pasqualini =

Italian architect

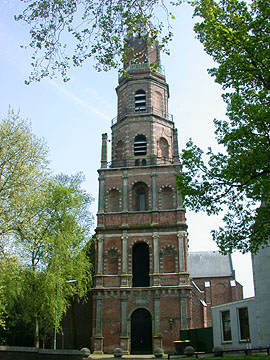
IJsselstein church, finished by Pasqualini in 1535

Alessandro Pasqualini (5 May 1493 – 1559) was an Italian Renaissance architect and engineer, born in Bologna, who helped bring Renaissance architecture to the Low Countries.

He was hired by Floris van Egmond, the count of Buren and lord of IJsselstein and Grave, and worked in the Netherlands for 18 years. His most important works from this period are the tower of the church of IJsselstein and the castle of Buren. Other works include an octagonal storey of the church tower of Buren, the facade of the south transept of the Sint-Elisabethkerk (St. Elisabeth church) of Grave and fortifications in Leerdam and Kampen.

In 1549, after the death of Maximiliaan van Egmond, Floris' son, Pasqualini was hired by Wilhelm V, duke of Jülich, Kleve and Berg. After the German city of Jülich was destroyed by fire in 1547, Pasqualini designed the reconstruction, based within bastioned fortifications and a square citadel around the castle. He also designed a palace and a town hall in the same town. He died in Bielefeld in 1559.

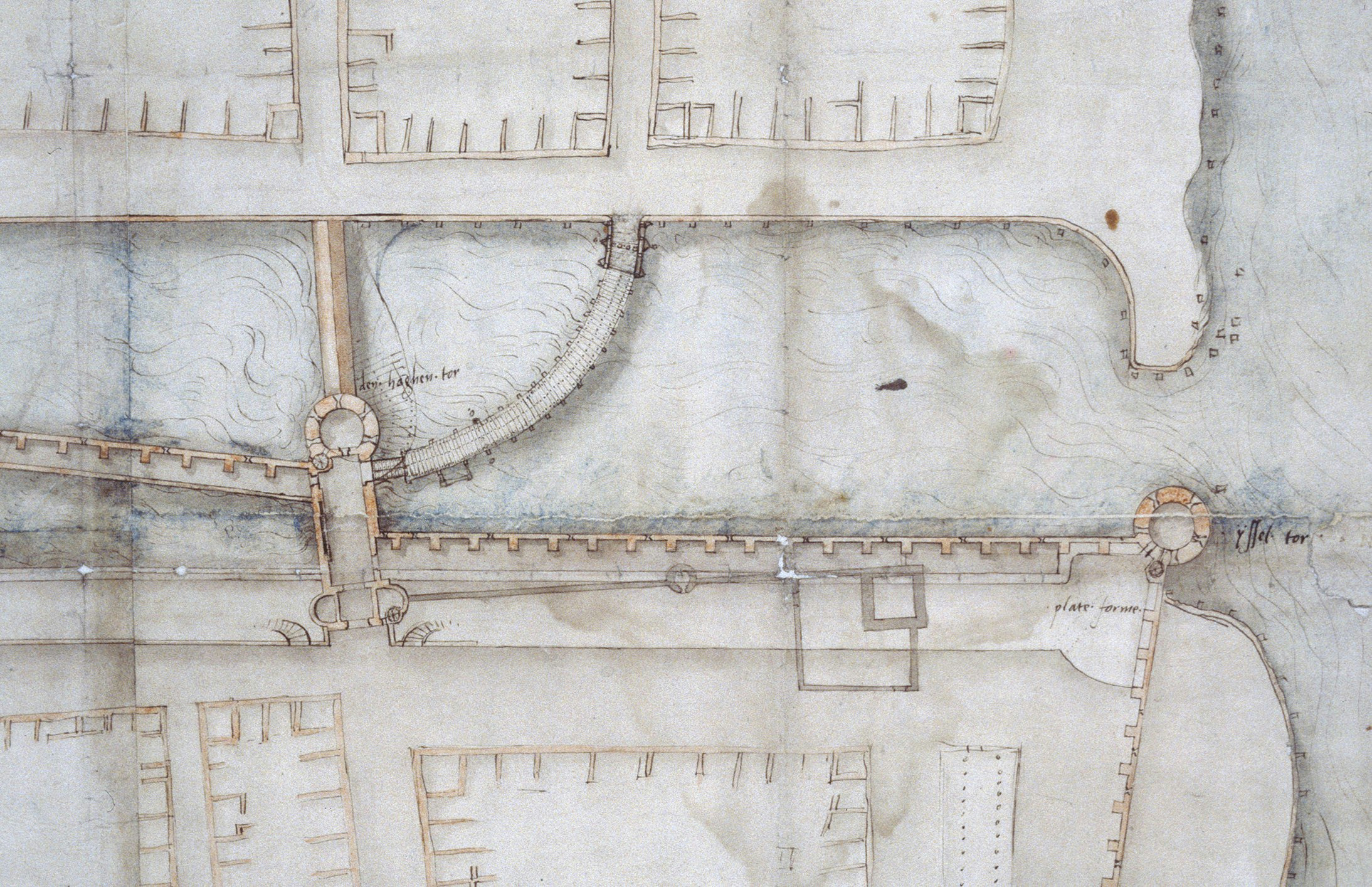
Map of Kampen

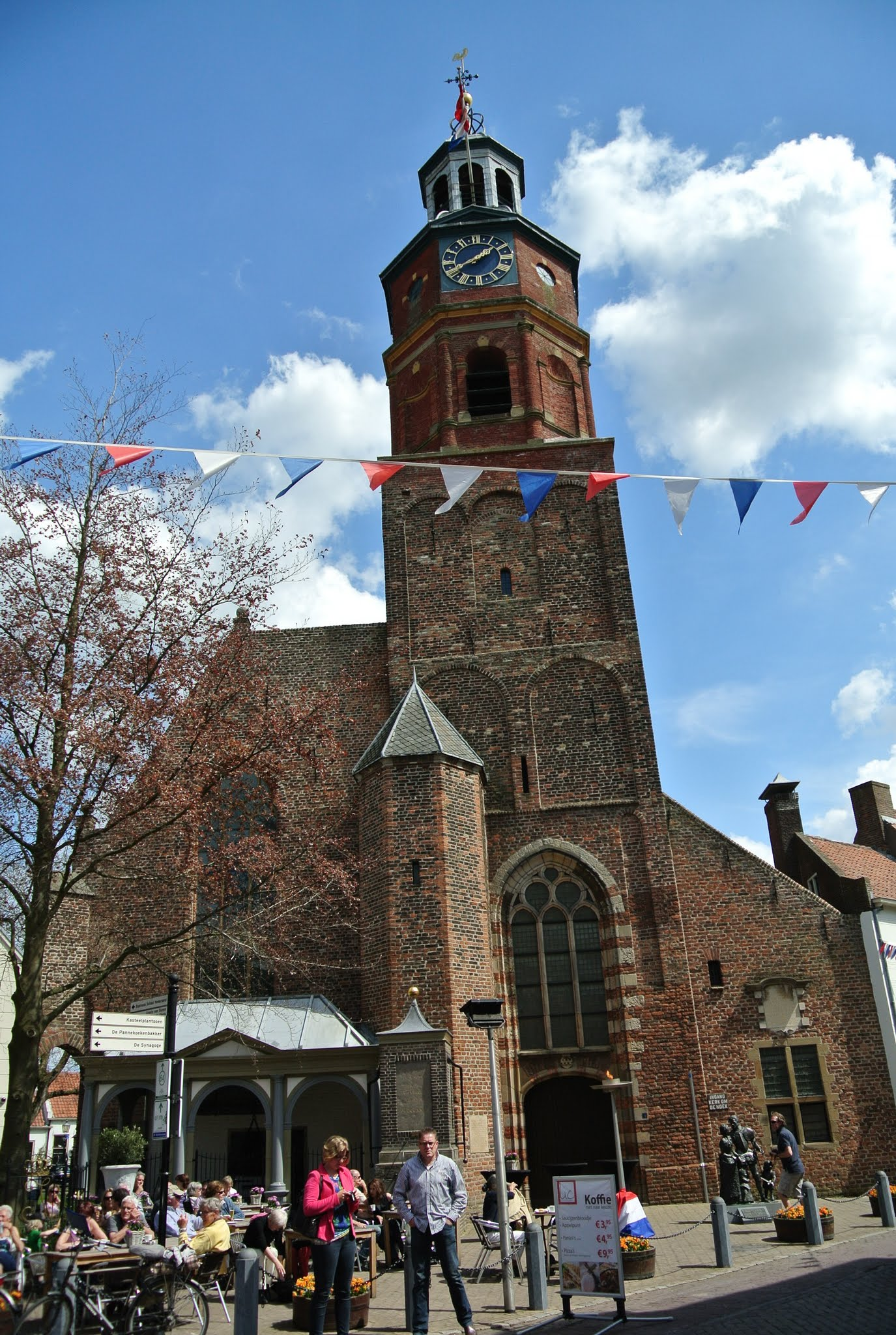
Buren

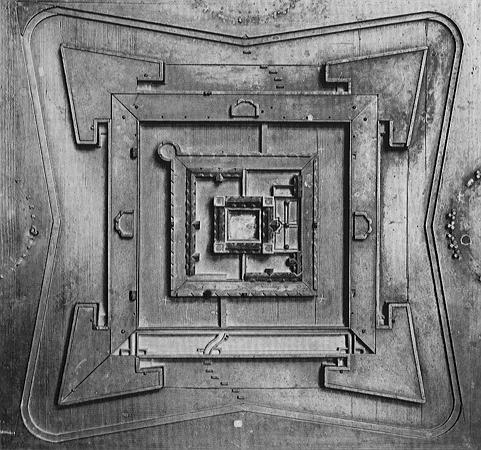
Citadel Jülich (plan)

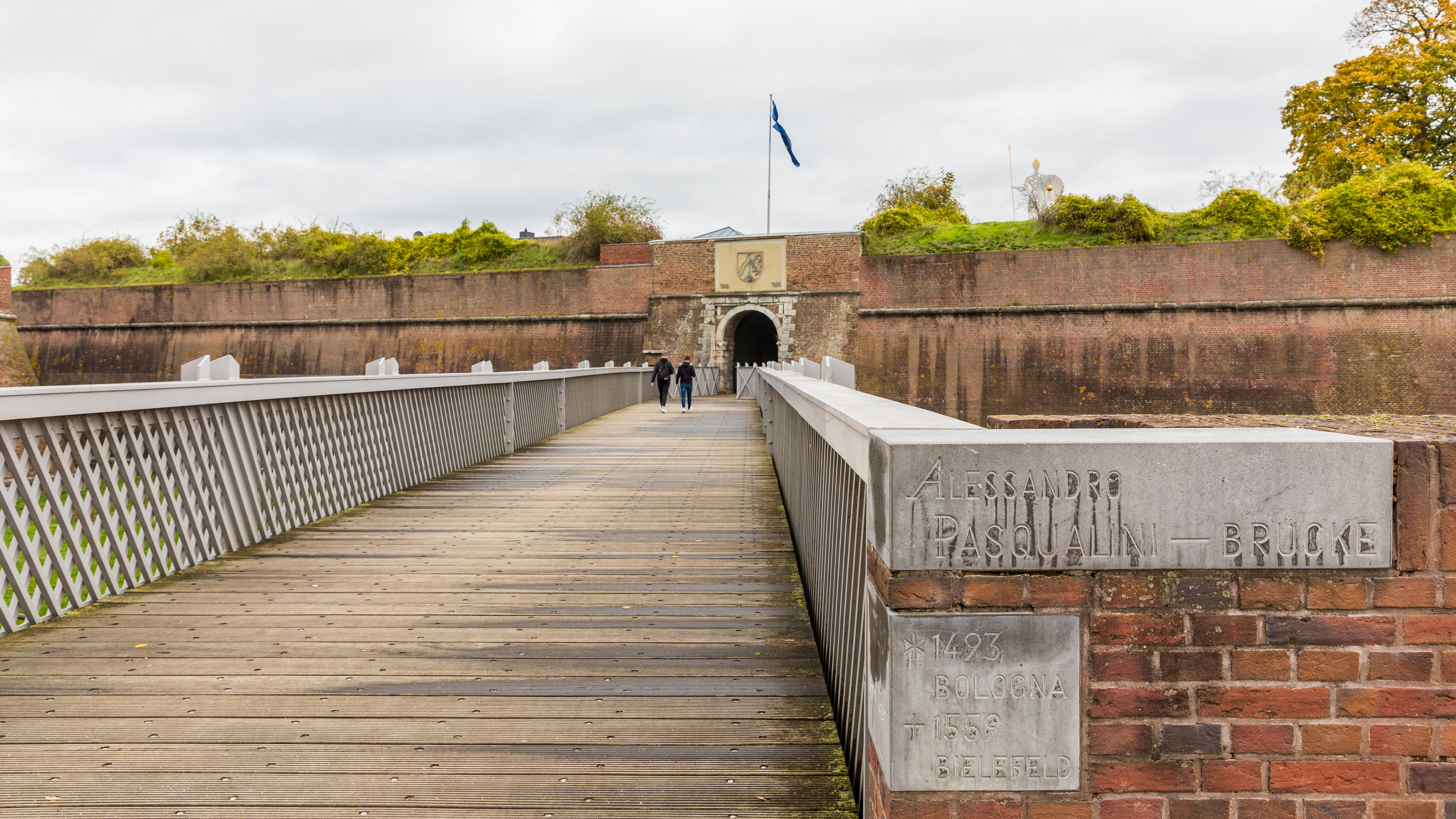
Jülich
