= Van Egmond =

Van Egmond or Van Egmont is Dutch toponymic surname meaning "from/of Egmond", a town in North Holland. Before 1811, the spelling of the name with a "d" or "t" was interchangeable. It can refer to any of the members of the House of Egmond (<1000–1682), of which better known members include:

- Anna van Egmond (1533–1558), first wife of William the Silent, Prince of Orange
- Anna van Egmont the Elder (1504–1574), daughter of Floris, mother of executed counts Horn and Montigny
- Arnold van Egmond (1410–1473), Duke of Guelders
- Floris van Egmond (ca.1470–1539), Stadtholder of Guelders
- Frederik van Egmond (ca.1440–1521), councilor of Charles the Bold en Maximilian I
- George van Egmond (ca.1504-1559), Christian religious authority and bishop of Utrecht
- Jan III van Egmond (1438–1516), first Count of Egmont, Stadtholder of Holland, Zeeland and West-Friesland
- Karel van Egmond (1467–1538), Duke of Guelders
- Lamoraal van Egmont (1522–1568), Dutch general and statesman, beheaded by Phillip II on charges of heresy
- Maximiliaan van Egmond (1509–1548), Stadtholder of Friesland
- Philip van Egmont (1558–1590), fifth Count of Egmont, son of Lamoraal
- Willem van Egmond (1412–1483), Stadtholder of Guelders

Other people with the surname, some of whom may be descendants of the noble family, include:

- Ab van Egmond (born 1938), Dutch racing cyclist
- Anthony Van Egmond (1778–1838), Dutch soldier and early settler in southwestern Ontario, Canada
- Derk van Egmond (born 1956), Dutch track cyclist.
- Emily van Egmond (born 1993), Australian football player
- Gary van Egmond (born 1965), Australian football player and manager
- Joshua van Egmond (born 1986), Australian weightlifter
- Jacobus van Egmond (1908–1969), Dutch racing cyclist
- Jordy van Egmond (born 1992), Dutch DJ and music producer known as Dyro
- Justus van Egmont (1602–1674), Dutch painter and a tapestry designer in Antwerp
- Max van Egmond (born 1936), Dutch bass and baritone singer
- Tim Van Egmond (born 1969), American baseball player
- William Gysbert Van Egmond (1883–1949), Canadian architect

== See also ==
- Adalbert of Egmond (died c. 710 in Egmond), Anglo-Saxon missionary in Holland and Frisia
