= Countess Maria of Nassau (1556–1616) =

Countess of Hohenlohe

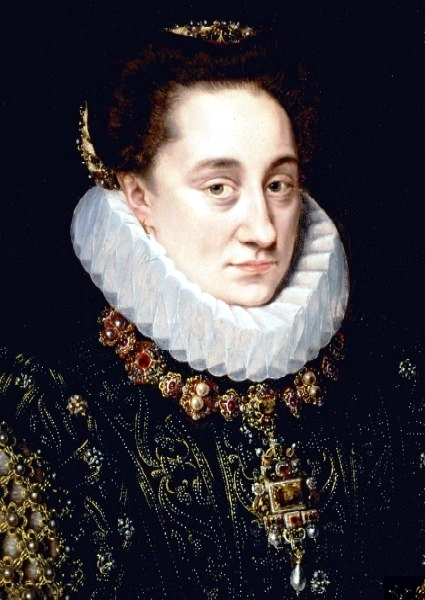
Countess Maria of Nassau

Countess Maria of Nassau (7 February 1556, Breda – 10 October 1616, Buren) was the second daughter of William the Silent by his first wife Anna of Egmont. She was named after William's first daughter, Maria, who had died in infancy.

== Biography ==
At the start of the Eighty Years' War her older brother Philip William was removed to Spain where he was raised as a Catholic. Maria vigorously defended her brother's claims to the title Prince of Orange and the barony and city of Breda against the claims of their half-brother Maurice of Nassau.

It was her wish to marry Philip, Count of Hohenlohe, whom she had known since she was eleven. This plan met with initial resistance of her father (he gave his permission in 1582) and continued resistance from her brother Maurice. She was supposed to marry the (Catholic) son of the duke of Aerschot, to help acquire him as an important ally against the Spanish forces, but Maria refused to marry him as she had become a Calvinist. Also, Maria claimed guardianship of the possessions of Philip William while hostage in Spain, because of her being a full sister to Philip William, while Maurice was only his younger half-brother, and started a trial.

On 2 February 1595, at the age of 39, Maria finally married Philip of Hohenlohe in Buren, in the Dutch Reformed Church. The couple remained childless and Philip died in 1606. Her brother Philip William was released in 1595 and returned to Breda in 1610. In 1612, Maria founded a large orphanage in Buren.

She died in 1616 in Buren. She was entombed in the Saint Lambert Church there, which by then had become a Protestant Reformed Calvinist church.

== Ancestors ==
Ancestors of Countess Maria of Nassau (1556–1616)

8. John V, Count of Nassau-Siegen
4. William I, Count of Nassau-Siegen
9. Elisabeth of Hesse-Marburg
2. William the Silent
10. Bodo III, Count of Stolberg-Wernigerode
5. Juliana of Stolberg-Wernigerode
11. Anna of Eppstein-Königstein
1. Maria of Nassau
12. Floris van Egmont
6. Maximiliaan van Egmond
13. Margaret of Glymes-Bergen
3. Anna of Egmond
14. Hugh de Lannay, Lord of Tronchiennes and Rollencourt
7. Françoise de Lannoy
15. Marie de Bouchout
