= Castle Buren =

Demolished castle in Buren, the Netherlands

Coordinates: 51.9125°N 5.3281°E

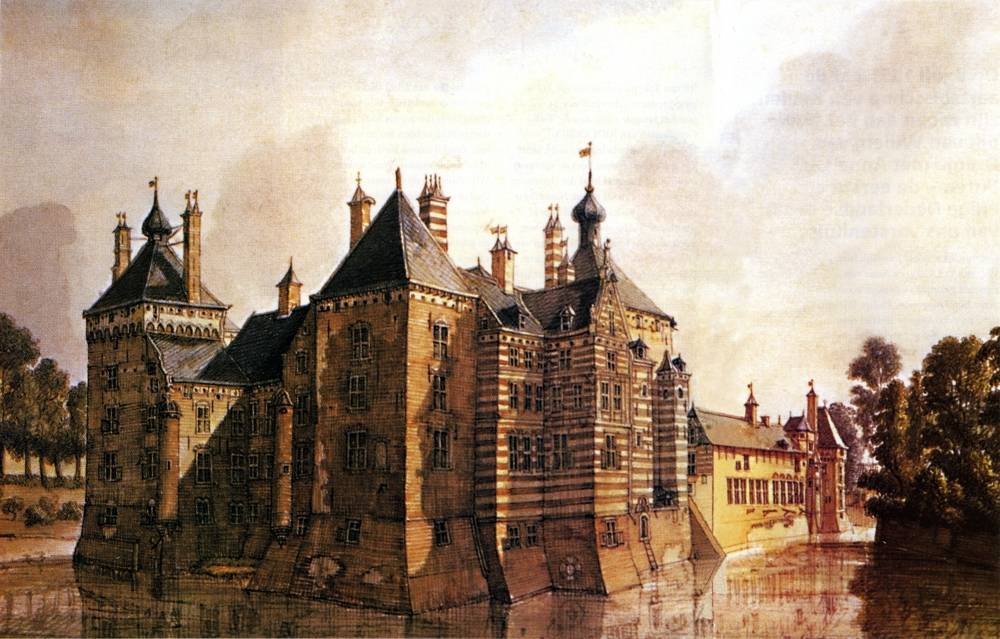
Buren castle at the start of the 17th century

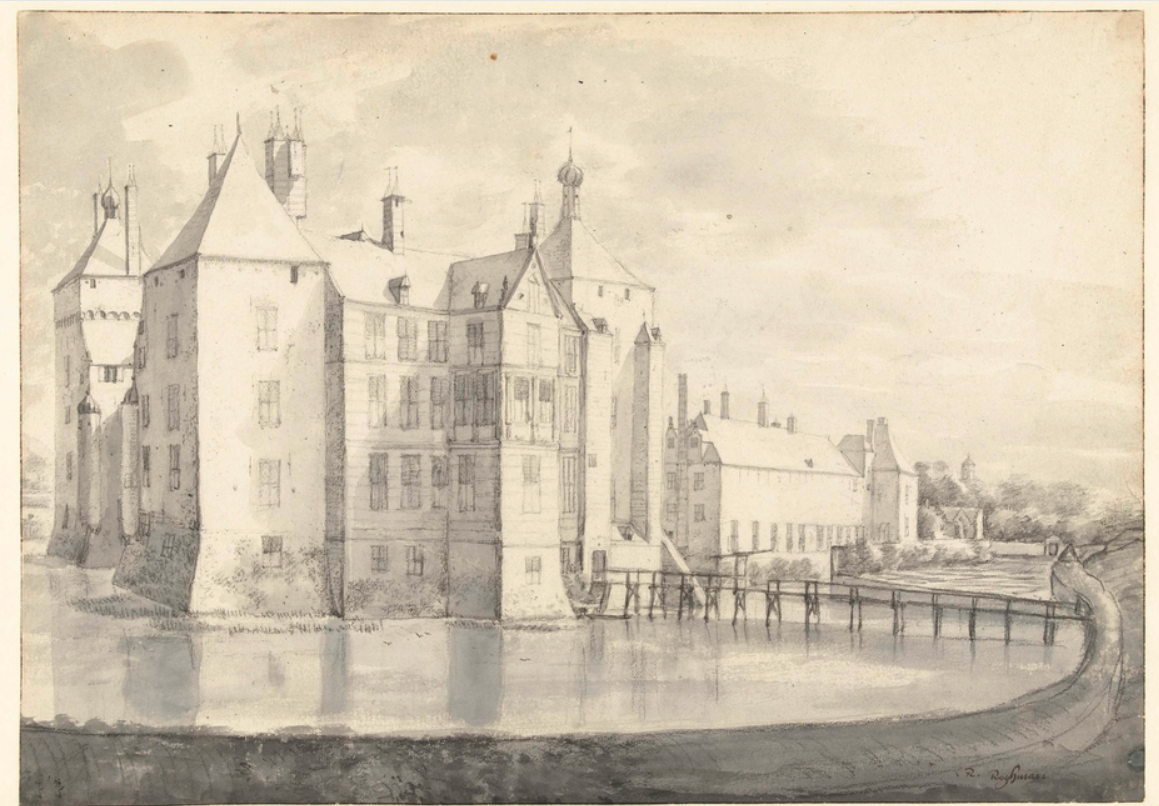
Buren castle by Roelant Roghman

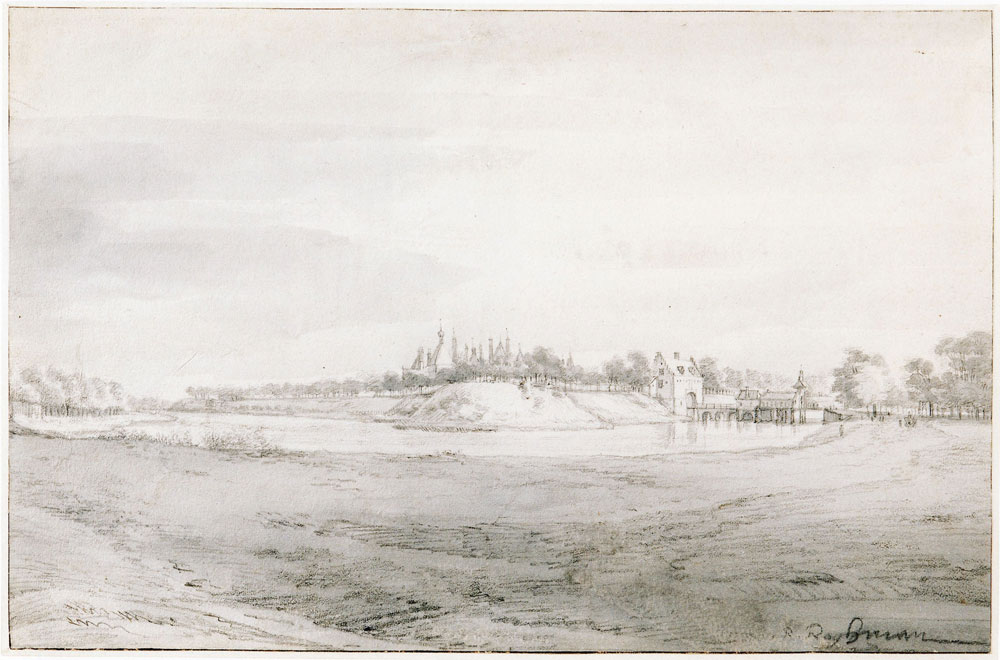
Buren castle from a distance by Roelant Roghman

Castle Buren or Buren Castle (Dutch: Kasteel Buren or Huis Buren) was a princely residence in Buren in the Dutch province of Gelderland. The castle was one of the largest castles in the Netherlands. It was the seat of the Buren branch of the Egmond family, as well as of the House of Orange. It has been demolished in the 19th century. Today, not much remains except a monument in the former bailey of the castle as well as model in the local museum.

== History ==
=== Tuff Castle Tower (12th century) ===
The earliest castle of Buren was probably constructed in the twelfth century. It was built on the sand of an east–west oriented ridge. A certain Otto van Buren is mentioned around 1190, but a castle is first mentioned a century later, in 1298. Foundations from that time have not been found. However, the oldest pottery shards found there date back to the eleventh or twelfth century. There probably was a tuff stone tower, about thirteen meters high, as during the demolition of the castle in 1809, 400 tons of tuff stone were sold. Tuff stone, originating from the German Eifel, was widely used for castle construction since the eleventh and twelfth centuries. The use of tuff stone as a building material decreased when brick began to be used from the 13th century onwards.

Due to its strategically important location, the Lordship of Buren had strong rulers for centuries. The Lords of Buren, who were the first to inhabit the castle, regulated water management, were the local lawmakers, and organized the oldest buildings along the river Korne. They also founded the chapel in 1367, from which the current parish church of Saint Lambertus later emerged. Lord Alard even granted Buren city rights in 1395.

=== Rectangular Castle with Outer Bailey (13th to 15th century) ===
In the thirteenth and early fourteenth centuries, the tuff stone tower was expanded into a rectangular castle around a courtyard, with two residential wings (on the north and west sides), large towers at the four corners of the castle, a defensive wall with a battlement, and a large rectangular gate tower. An outer bailey was also built with two towers, at the northeast and southeast corners.

In 1335, the castle was captured and damaged by enemy troops. Nearly a century later, in 1430, it was sieged again and heavily damaged once more.

=== The Egmonds in Buren (16th century) ===
==== Frederik van Egmond – A Residence with Palatial Allure ====
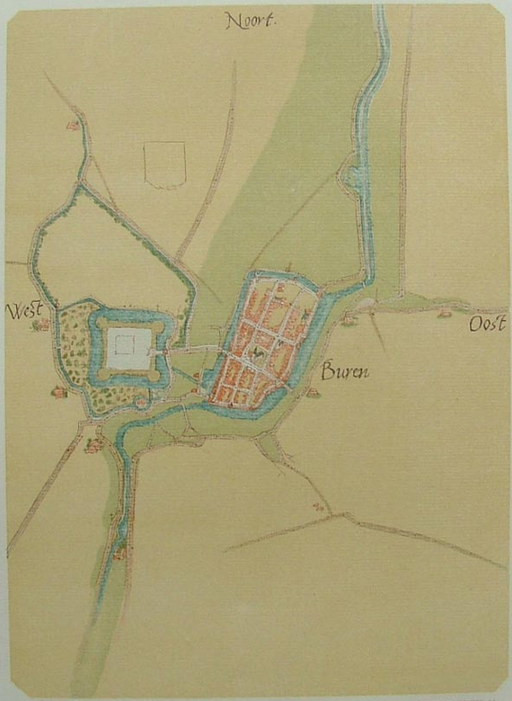
16th century map showing Buren castle and Buren village

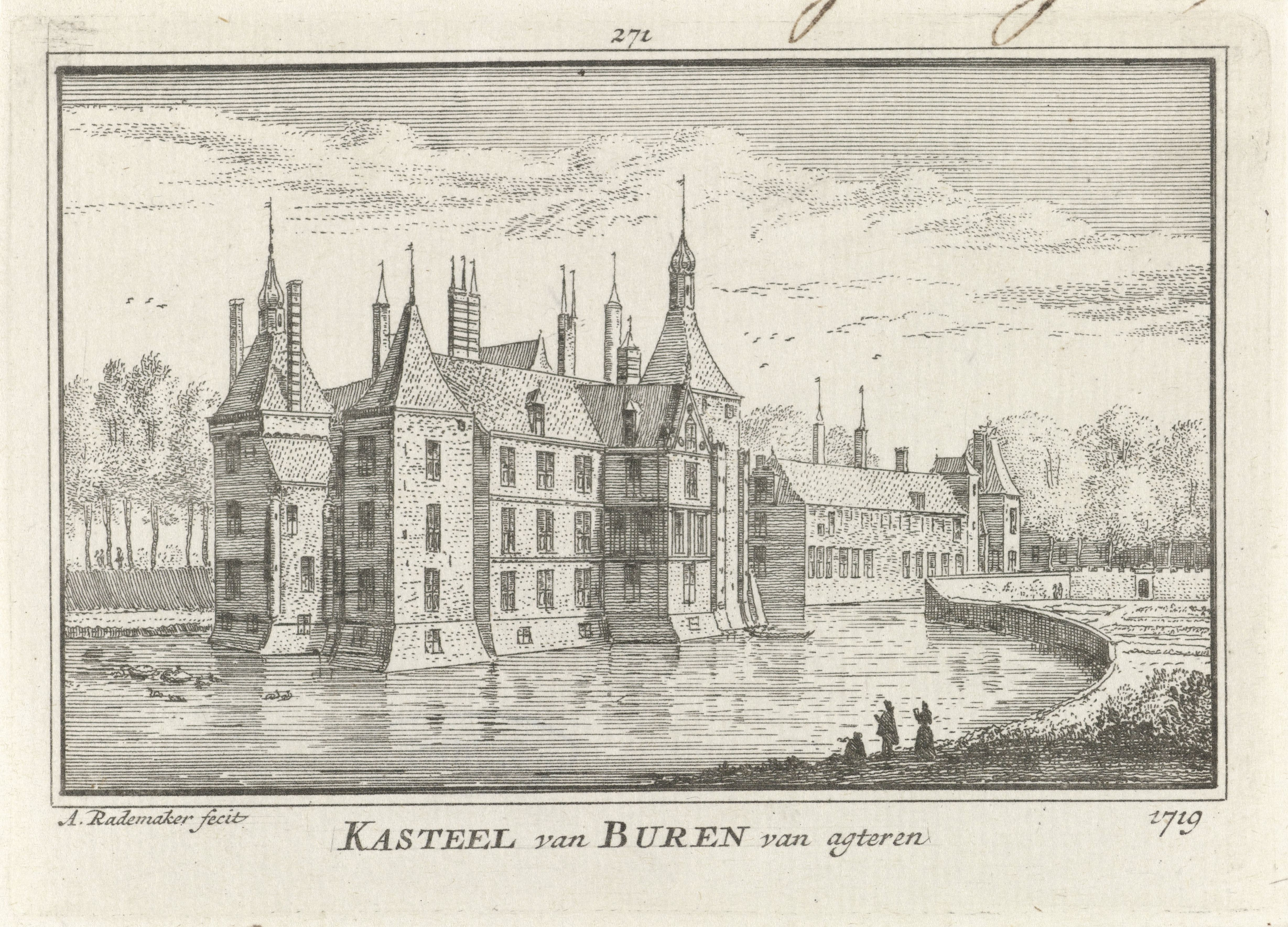
Castle Buren by Abraham Rademaker

Arnold, Duke of Guelders (1410–1473), expelled the Lords of Buren. He granted the castle, town, and lordship of Buren to his cousin, Frederik of Egmond (1440–1521). The Egmond family hailed from the Dutch village of Egmond near Alkmaar. By the fifteenth century, they were already among the most important nobles in the Netherlands. They held high military and political positions, serving as commanders and advisors to emperors, guardians of hereditary princes, and stewards in large parts of the Netherlands. Their significance at the Burgundian-Habsburg Court was such that they were ennobled as counts in 1498.

In 1493, the castle suffered heavy damage again when Charles II, Duke of Guelders (1467–1538) and grandson of Arnold, besieged the castle. Frederik van Egmond had it repaired and transformed into a comfortable residential palace in the early sixteenth century. Renaissance ornaments emphasized its palatial allure. New residential wings with a gate tower and a projecting extension, the Princes' Quarter, rose between the corner towers.

Because the castle was no longer defensible due to the increased firepower of cannons, an earthen rampart with bastions (and gunpowder magazines) was constructed around the castle corners. A gatehouse lay in the eastern rampart. At this stage, the castle complex reached its largest size: 225 by 300 meters. The castle became a 'Palazzo in Fortezza', a structure where a palace or noble residence is incorporated or built within a fortress of fortified complex. Other examples of such a type castle are Breda Castle, Villa Farnese in Caprarola, Italy, Krzyżtopór castle and Łańcut Castle in Poland.

The work was overseen by various master builders, including Rombout II Keldermans (before 1530). Andrien Seron was the architect for the castle in Breda, where the natural stone ornaments for the Buren castle were made in the construction workshop. It is therefore possible that Seron was also the architect for the Buren castle. Alessandro Pasqualini, as a fortification engineer, oversaw the construction activities of the castle's fortifications but probably did not design them. Tomasso Vincidor has also been mentioned as an architect.

==== Floris van Egmond – Florentine Renaissance ====
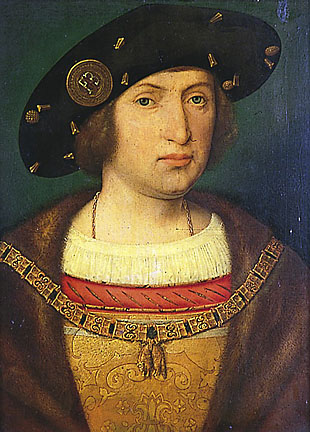
Floris van Egmond as Knight of the Golden Fleece

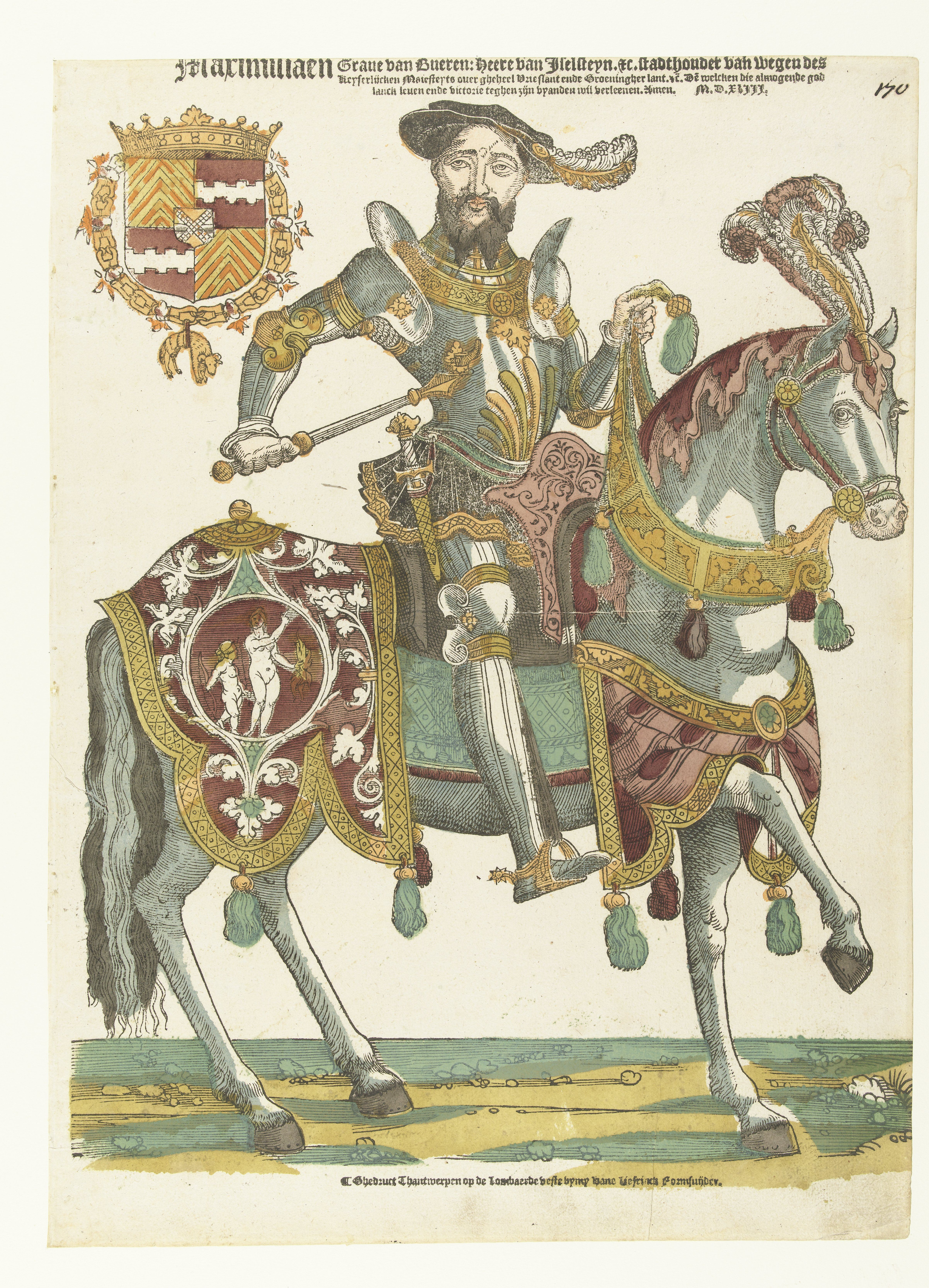
Maximiliaan van Egmond

With each succeeding generation, the power and wealth of the Egmonds grew. Count Floris van Egmont (1570–1539) brought Alessandro Pasqualini from Bologna, Papal States, to Buren in 1537. This versatile architect worked for the counts of Buren with a few interruptions until 1548. He is best known for his extensive renovation of Buren's twelfth-century defensive fortress. In six years, the castle was transformed into a luxurious Florentine Renaissance-style palace, with four corner towers and one hundred seventy rooms. The total area measured 'in its circumference 1360 steps,' according to a description from 1741.

More and larger windows were added, totalling 365, allowing sunlight to flood in. Niches were created in the thick walls from which one could view the water in the moat. It was a comfortable residence. An elegant gallery with ornamented pilasters rose in the large courtyard. Together with the outer bailey, the double moat, and three drawbridges, along with four bastions and gun emplacements, they provided grandeur and security.

==== Maximilian van Egmond ====
For Floris's successor, Count Maximilian (1509–1548), Pasqualini designed new gates in the city walls, of which only the Huizer or Culemborg gate remains today. He also improved the fortifications. With its streets perpendicular to each other, all leading to the city wall, Buren still retains the form of an Italian-French bastide (fortified town) to this day.

=== William of Orange (16th century) ===
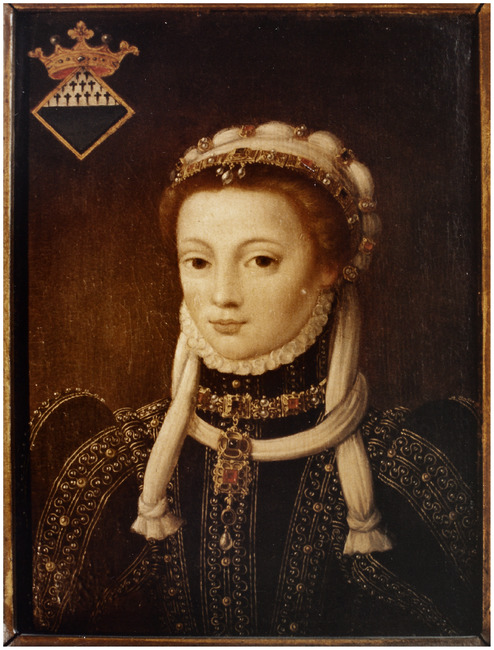
Anna van Egmond-Buren

In 1545, Count Maximilian received a high-profile visit from Charles V, Holy Roman Emperor, accompanied by, among others, his twelve-year-old page, William, Prince of Orange (1533–1584). Maximilian's only child was his daughter Anna van Egmond (1553–1558), also twelve years old. It is likely that the Emperor and the Count agreed on a marriage between the two on this occasion.

In 1551, the Archbishop of Cologne blessed the marriage of Prince William of Orange and Countess Anna of Egmond-Buren in the chapel of Buren Castle. Both were eighteen years old. Among the hundreds of guests on the wedding day of July 8, 1551, were the four brothers of William of Orange. The young couple alternated between living at Castle Buren and Breda Castle. Anna died just seven years later after a brief illness. The castle was inherited by her eldest son, Philip William, Prince of Orange. Unfortunately, he was abducted on the orders of King Philip II of Spain and spent much of his life in Spanish exile.

=== Maurice of Orange (17th century) ===
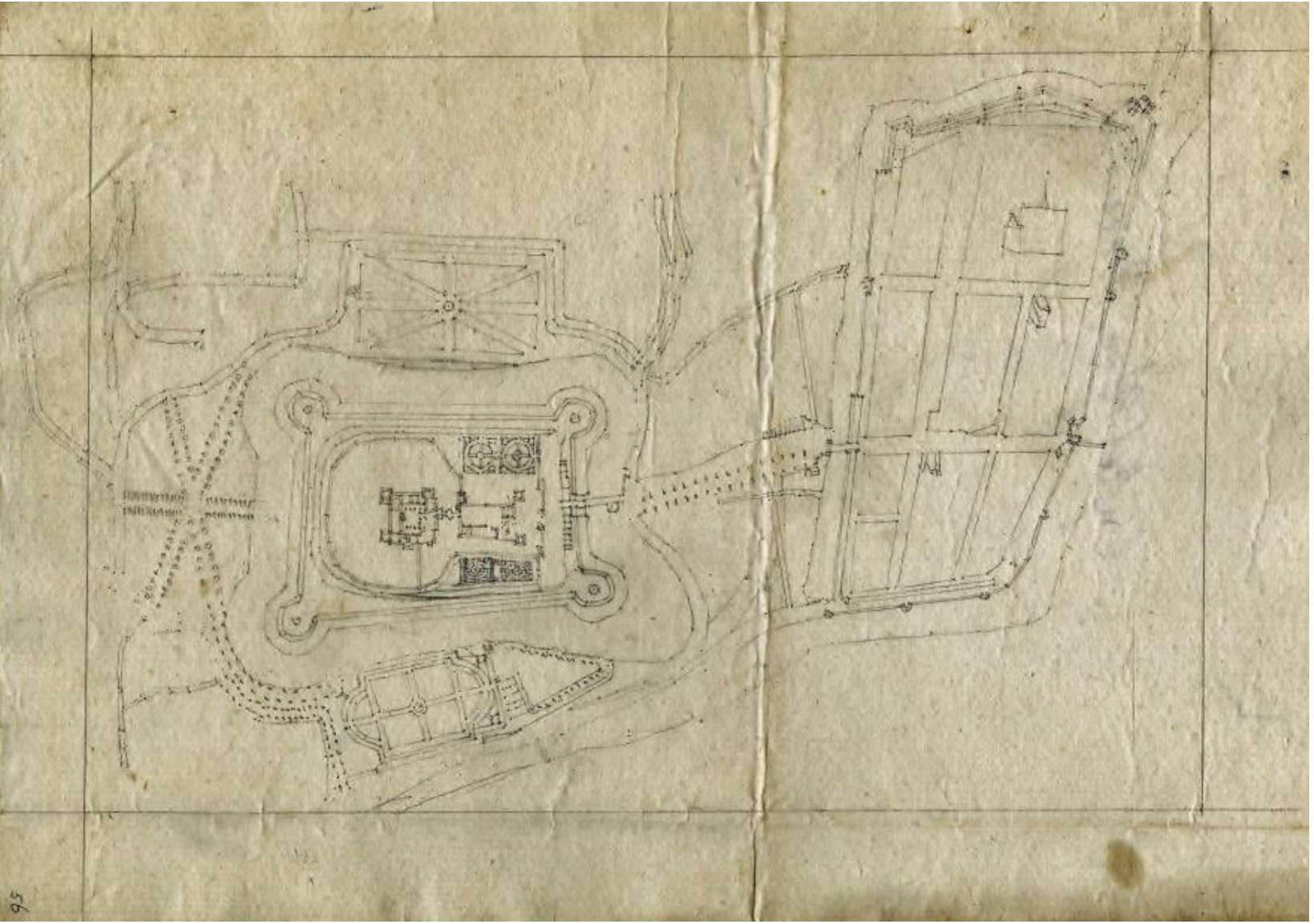
Plan of the castle and village of Buren in 1628

Due to Philip William's forced stay in Spain, his brother Maurice, Prince of Orange (1567–1625) assumed control of the County of Buren. Maurice led the struggle for freedom of the Netherlands against Spain and could spare little attention to Buren Castle. However, he had a new parapet built on the bastions. He also sketched plans for two Renaissance gardens on either side of the outer bailey in the year 1620.

In the first half of the 17th century, various gardens were constructed around the castle. Upon his return from Brussels in 1608, Philip William, Prince of Orange, had a garden built on the south side of the outer moat, known as the Prince's Garden.

When Maurice owned the castle of Buren between 1618 and 1625, the construction of two gardens within the walls began. The Great Court, the northern garden within the walls, was the first to be constructed, for which 30 linden trees, 6,000 hornbeam trees, and 35,000 firethorns were imported. The linden trees were planted along the avenue before entering the court. Subsequently, the Small Court, the southern garden within the walls, was constructed. These gardens resembled the garden next to the Mauritshuis at the Buitenhof in The Hague.

=== Frederick Henry of Orange (17th century) ===
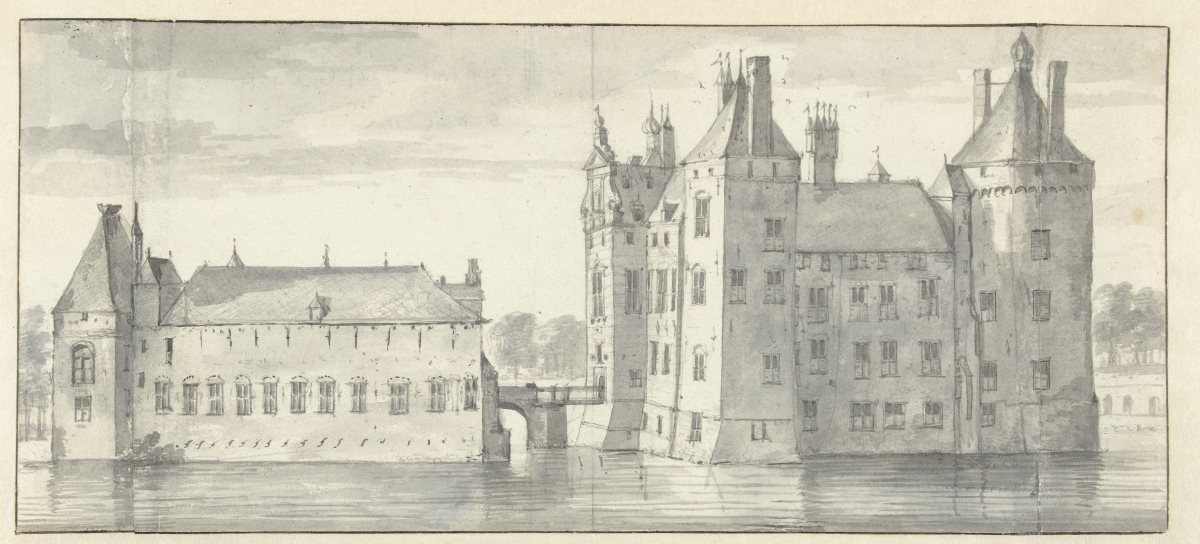
Engraving of Buren castle by Jan Beerstraten

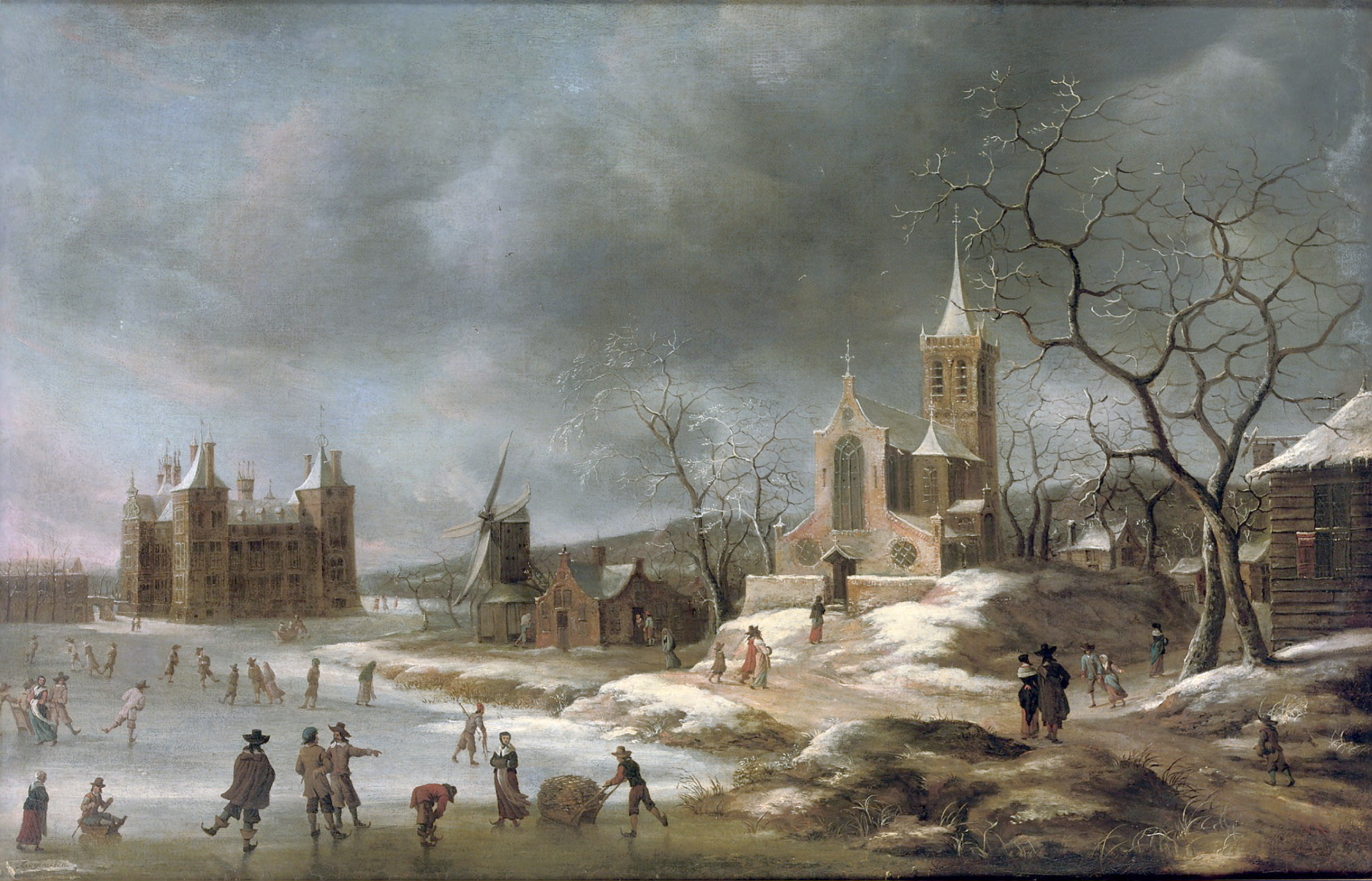
Jan Abrahamsz Beerstraaten painted a winter landscape with Buren castle

Frederick Henry of Nassau (1584–1647) became the heir to Maurice in 1625. In addition to the two courts within the walls, gardens outside the walls were also constructed. By around 1630, the castle grounds were surrounded by five gardens: the Prince's Garden, presumably created in 1608 on the south side; the 'Racecourse' with a star-shaped pattern of three intersecting avenues on the west side; and the northern garden consisting of a rectangular plot with a star-shaped path structure.

In 1636, Frederick Henry and his wife Amalia also decided to enhance the castle, particularly its interior. He commissioned Jacob van Campen, Johan van Swieten, and Pieter Post for this purpose. The works lasted until 1647. The gallery was painted with winged putti holding their respective coats of arms. A 'Triumphal Hall' was created on the first floor, for which several rooms were demolished to make a gallery. Large paintings depicted the spectacular conquests of the stadtholder. It was intended to impress the numerous high-ranking guests, including Queen Henrietta Maria of England (1609–1669).

=== Decline of the Castle (1647-1804) ===
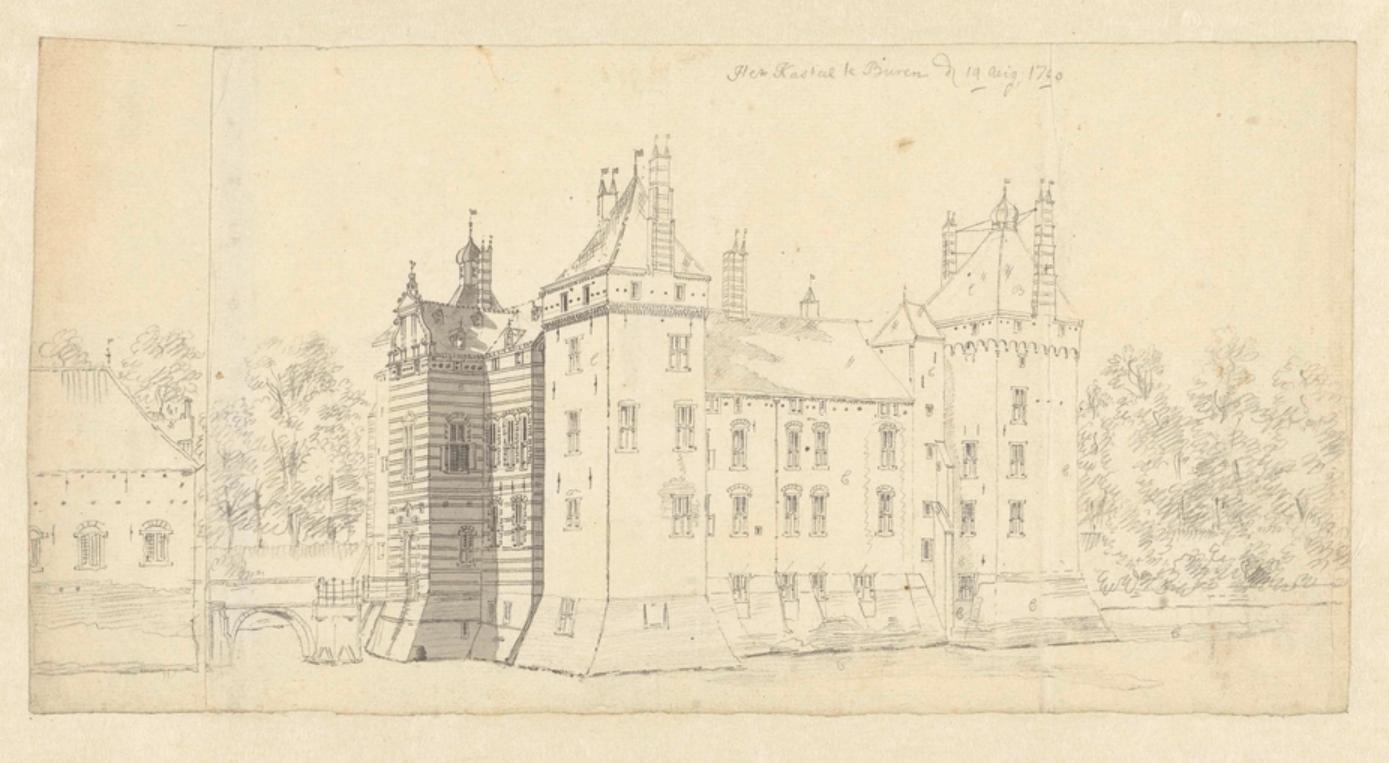
Buren castle by Jan de Beijer around 1750

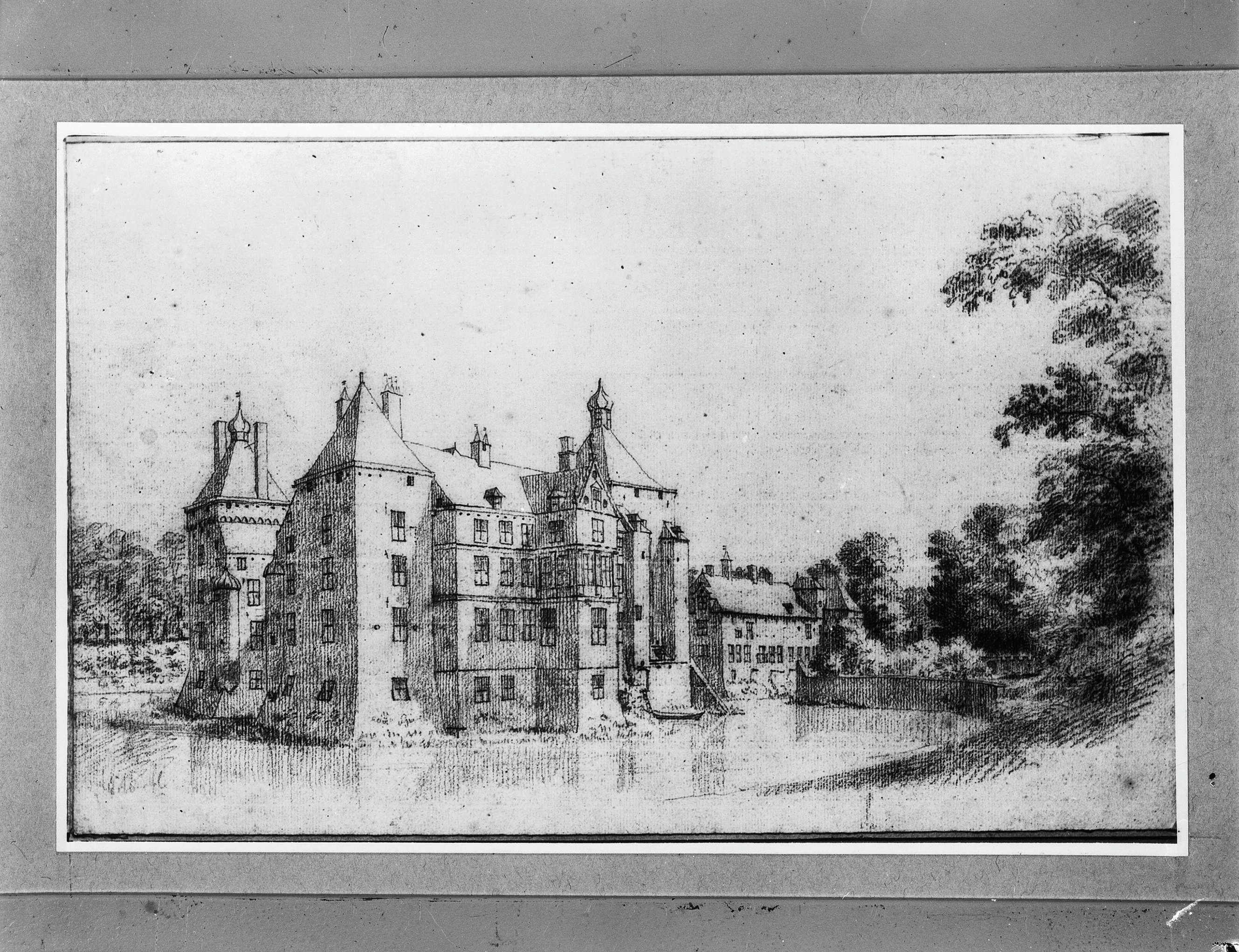
Buren castle

After the death of Frederick Henry, a period of neglect and decline began. William II (son of Frederick Henry) and his wife Mary Stuart showed no interest in Buren. The castle was largely stripped of its furnishings, the gardens became overgrown, and the building fell into disrepair. William III to William V were successive owners, but their castle remained neglected. King-Stadtholder William III had the most beautiful pieces transferred to his newly built hunting lodge, Soestdijk Palace.

The gardener and plantation master Cornelis van Langelaar (1676–1748), appointed in 1705, gradually rose to higher positions within the Domain Council, the management authority on behalf of the successive stadtholders. Thus, the surroundings of the castle, the houses on the outer bailey, and along the castle avenue were inhabited. Langelaar's daughter was married to an agent who lived at Buren Castle.

The castle was extensively drawn and painted. Most drawings date from the 1720s and 1730s. At the end of the century, the castle was no longer inhabited. In 1789, Prussian troops were quartered in the castle following the Patriottentijd. Subsequently, it was used as a hospital for Hessian and English soldiers who completely ravaged it.

With William V, the end came. This last Stadtholder fled to England when the French invaded the country in 1795. In 1801, the County of Buren lost its independence.

=== Demolition and Destruction of the Castle (1804-1883) ===
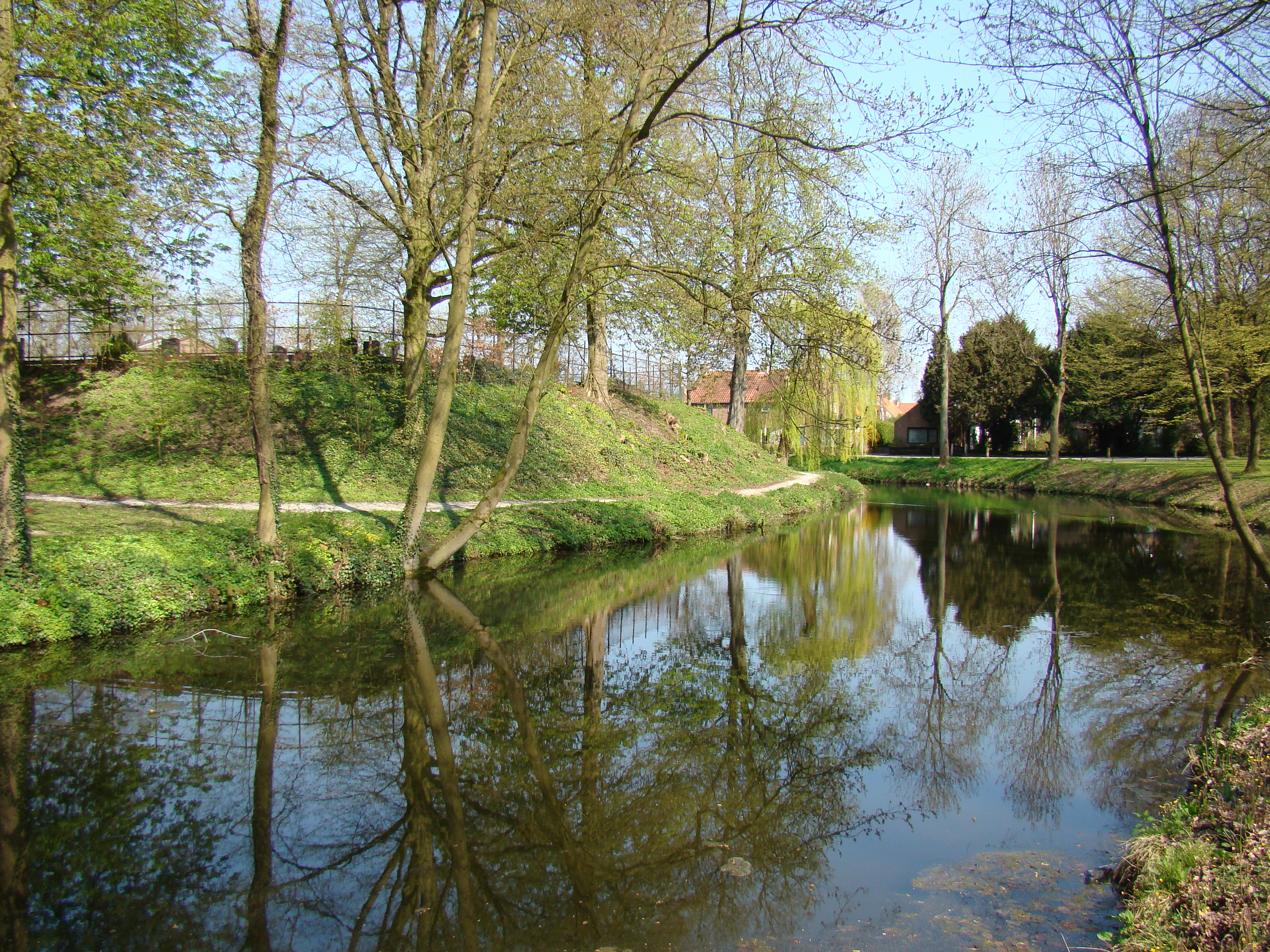
Former castle moat

After the establishment of the Batavian Republic, the castle was confiscated as property of the House of Orange. During the republic, little care was given to the building and the grounds. Moreover, no purpose could be found for the castle, leading the government to decide in 1804 to sell the castle, the bailiff's residence, and a large portion of the buildings and stables for demolition. On that occasion, the municipality of Buren became the owner.

In the same year, demolition of the castle began. Usable materials, such as bricks, beams, and poles, were sold to interested parties. The rubble was thrown into the inner moat around the castle, and the earthworks were pushed into the outer moat. The demolition of the castle lasted until 1883, when the last gatehouse was demolished.

==== Building Fragments and Reuse ====
Large quantities of wood, stone, and tiles, monumental fireplaces and doors, stairs, ornate pilasters and gates were sold and ended up in farmhouses or served as building materials for houses in Buren. Various remaining building fragments are located in the Egmond Hall of the Buren & Orange Museum.

=== Today ===
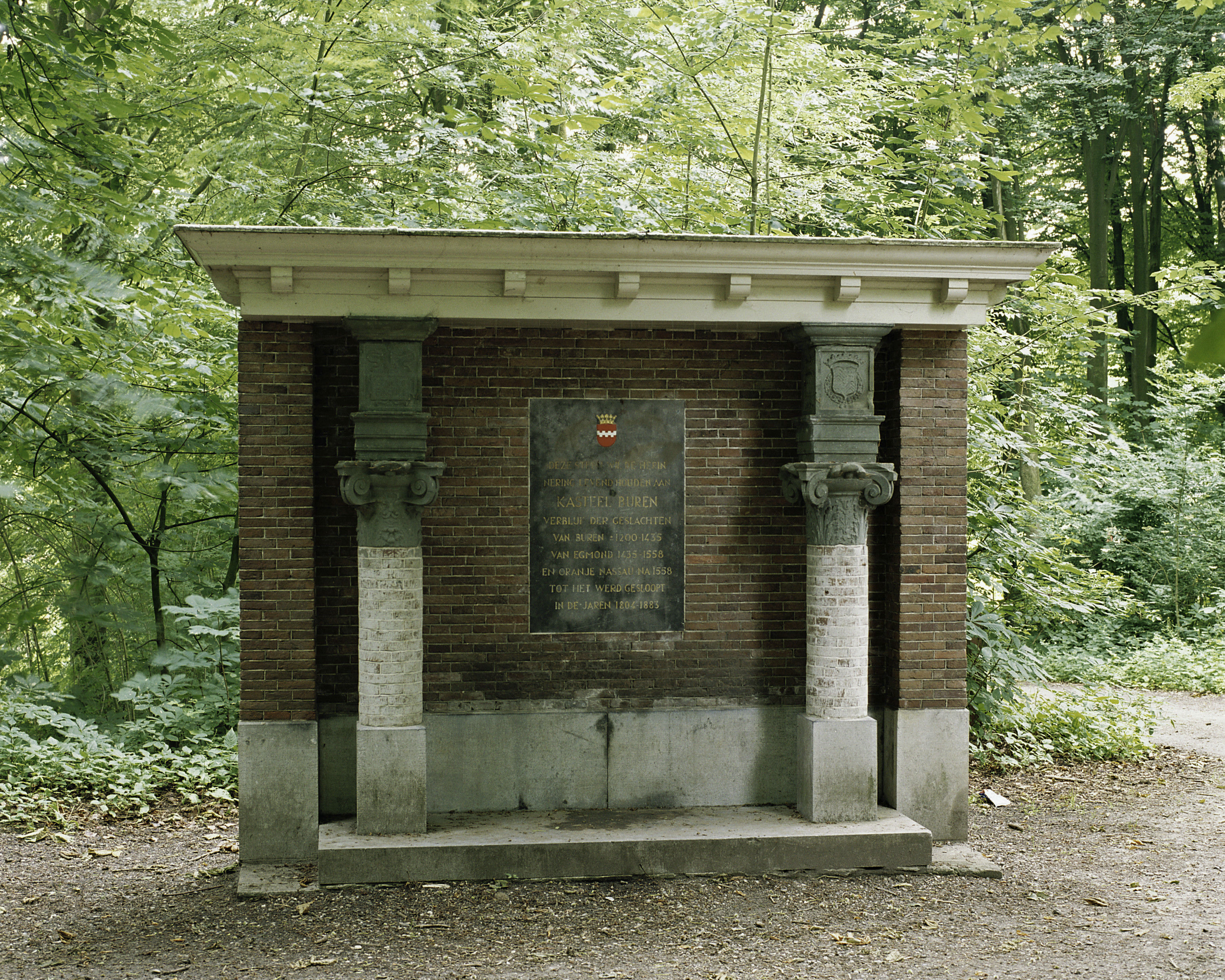
Monument remembering Buren castle

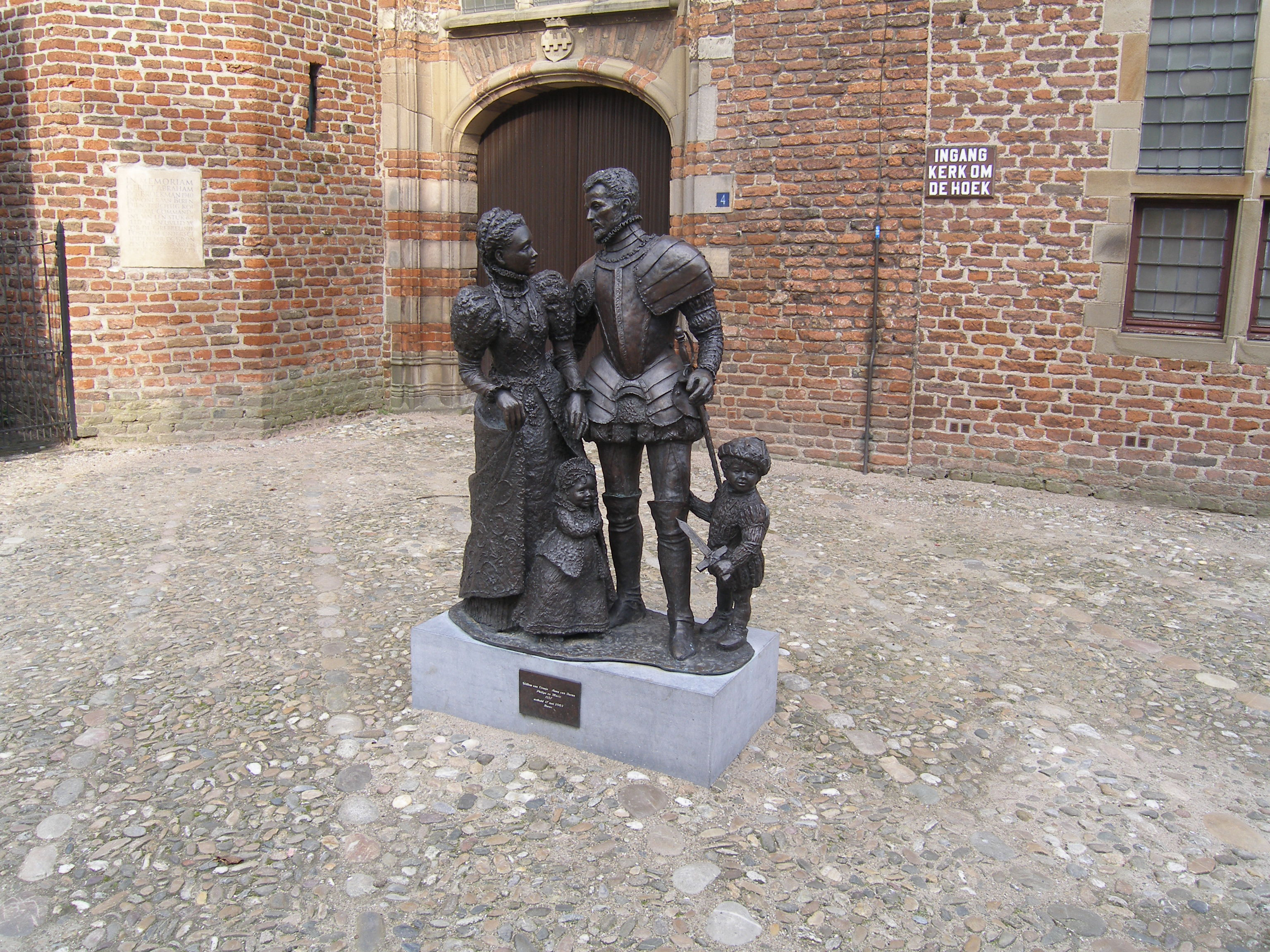
Statue of William of Orange and Anna van Egmond-Buren

Only the castle grounds have largely remained intact, which still contain the foundations in the ground. These foundations were partially excavated in 2003. By digging a few well-chosen test trenches, which included both the outer bailey and the main castle, a good idea was obtained of what the castle looked like in the past and what the current condition of the foundations is.

In the Oranjemuseum in the town of Buren, there is a large model that very accurately depicts the castle as it appeared at its peak.

== Literature ==
- Schipperus, P.J. (1962). Buren en Oranje - Geschiedkundig Overzicht Van Het Graaf Schap Buren, De Stad En Het Kasteel En Van Het Weeshuis (in Dutch). Buren: D.J Thijssen. p. 75.
- Coppens, Thera (1989). Buren Egmond en Oranje Over heren, graven en prinsen (in Dutch). Buren: Stichting Oud Buren. p. 239. ISBN 978-9026103643.
- Bente, D.A.; Van Kempen, P.A.M.M. (2000). Kasteel Buren, Gemeente Buren, een archeologisch onderzoek - RAAP Rapport 611 (in Dutch). Amsterdam: Bureau RAAP.
- Van Kempen, Paul; Hom, Caroline (2005). Verborgen kastelen in zicht : archeologisch onderzoek en inrichting van kasteelterreinen (in Dutch). Amsterdam: Bureau RAAP/ Nederlandse Kastelenstichting. p. 102. ISBN 978-9053721148.
- Vredenberg, Jan, ed. (2013). Kastelen in Gelderland (in Dutch). Utrecht: Uitgeverij Matrijs. p. 185. ISBN 978-90-5345-410-7.
- Albers, L.H.; Guinée, A.W.J. (2014). Kasteelterrein Buren Renovatie van het Plantsoen (Report) (in Dutch). Beekbergen: Albers Adviezen Historische Parken.
