= Philip of Hohenlohe-Neuenstein =

Dutch count and army commander (1550–1606)

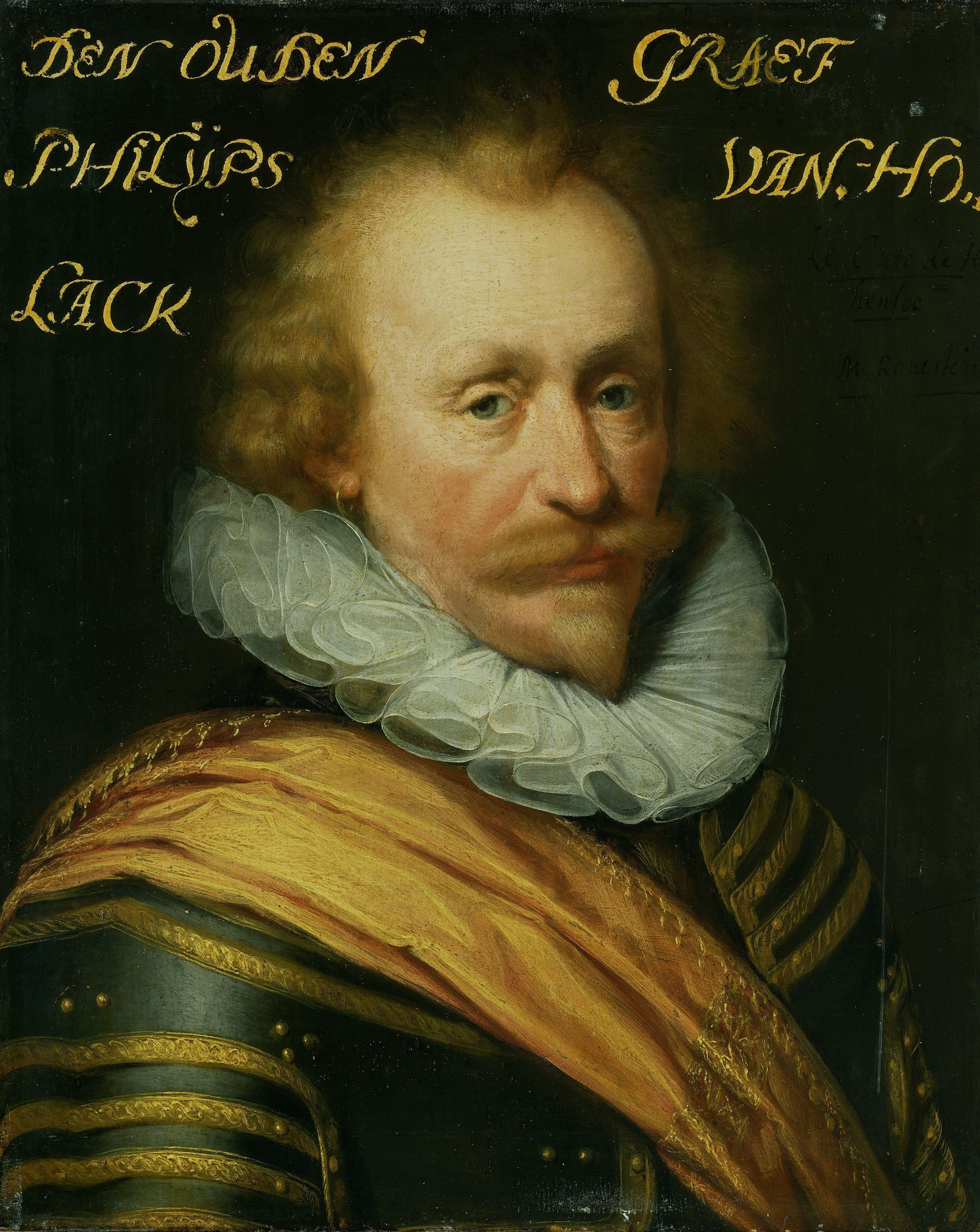
Philip of Hohenlohe

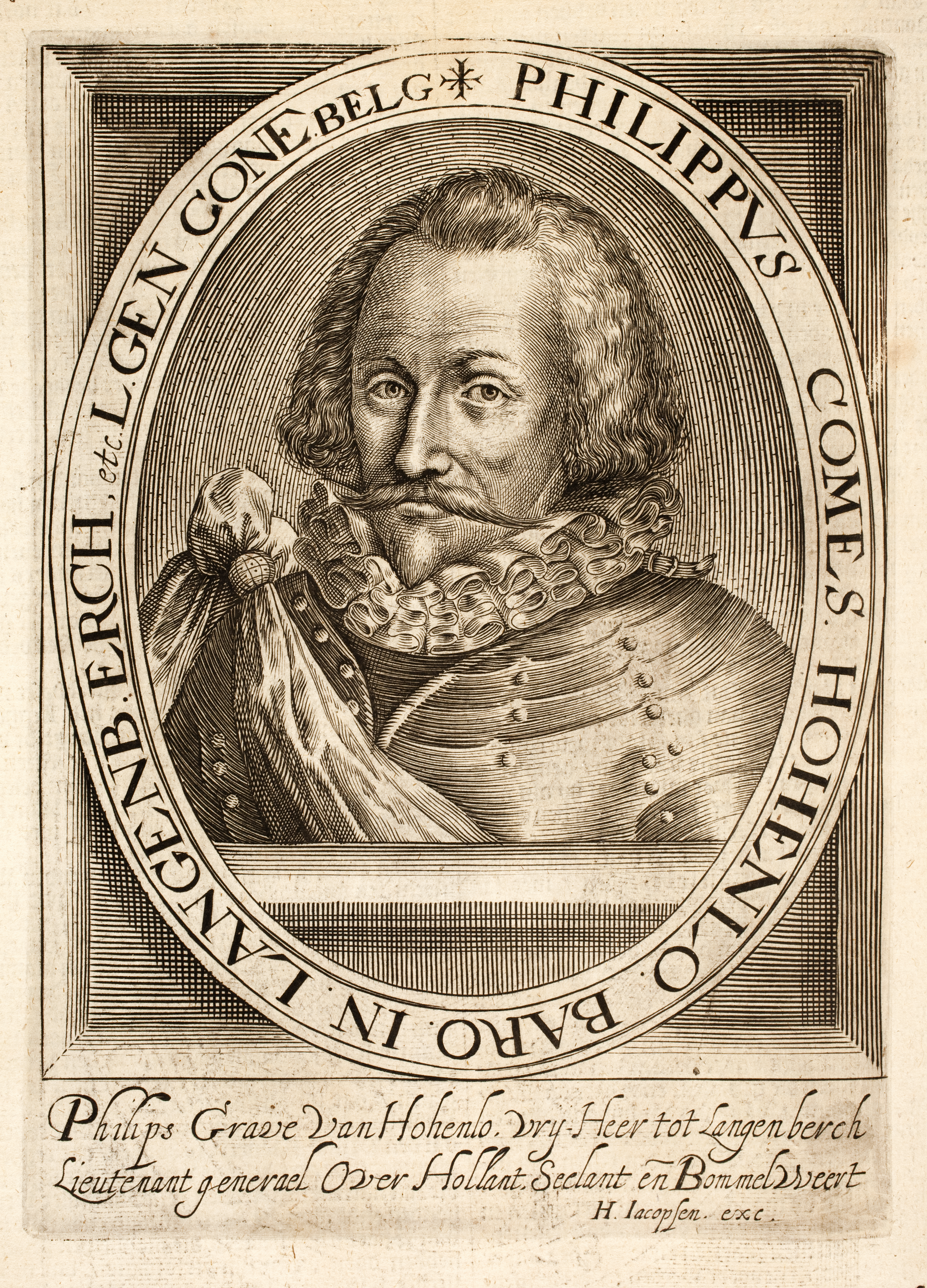
Engraving of Philip of Hohenlohe-Neuenstein

Philip of Hohenlohe-Neuenstein (17 February 1550 – 6 March 1606), Count of Hohenlohe-Langenburg, was an army commander in service of the Dutch Republic.

== Early life and ancestry ==
Philip was born into an old House of Hohenlohe, as the son of Count Ludwig Kasimir von Hohenlohe-Waldenburg (1517–1568) and his wife, Countess Anna zu Solms-Lich (1522–1594).

== Biography ==
Philip of Hohenlohe, also called Hollock, had been in service of William I of Orange since 1575, and he was William's Lieutenant-general in Holland. Hohenlohe conquered Geertruidenberg in 1576, Steenbergen in 1577, Tholen and Breda and later amongst others Mengen and Gennep (1599). In 1590 he constructed a fort at 's-Hertogenbosch.

Because of his experience he remained lieutenant-general on the request of the States of Holland after William of Orange was assassinated in 1584. Maurice of Orange, William's son, was still too young to rule. Hohenlohe was a courageous, but reckless commander. He also had a drinking problem. After Maurice became captain-general of the Republic, relations between him and Hohenlohe gradually became worse. Maurice thought Hohenlohe was unreliable and was bad at keeping secrets. The bad relations also had a private cause: In 1582 Hohenlohe had asked William of Orange for permission to marry his eldest daughter, Maria of Nassau. The marriage had not taken place yet because of financial problems.

After William's assassination there was a quarrel over his inheritance. The rightful heir of William of Orange was Philip William of Orange, but he was imprisoned in Spain. Maria had maintained control over William's possessions since 1584, and after the siege of Breda Maria apparently had managed to collect enough money to proceed with the marriage. After the marriage Hohenlohe was supposed to take control of an important share of the inheritance of William of Orange. Maurice opposed this, and in 1591 the States-General split the possessions. Maria of Nassau was given the county of Buren, Maurice was given the rest. Years of legal battle produced no results. In 1595 Hohenlohe married with Maria of Nassau.

Hohenlohe served under Maurice during Maurice's campaign of 1597, and during the Siege of Groenlo. But after his marriage Hohenlohe became more and more isolated. Maurice hardly gave him any command in his army anymore. He reached a low-point in 1600, when Maurice dismissed him as lieutenant-general of Holland and Zeeland.

In 1604 Hohenlohe became ill and started getting paralysis-symptoms. He died on 6 March 1606 at IJsselstein. After his death his body was taken to Öhringen (Baden-Württemberg) by his wife, and he was interred in the family-tomb in the collegiate church of St. Peter and St. Paul on 5 November 1606.

== Personal life ==
On 7 February 1595 he married Maria of Nassau at Buren. The marriage produced one son, Count Philipp Moritz, who died in infancy. Shortly before his death Philip adopted the nine-year-old Countess Margareta Maria of Daun-Falkenstein (1597–1620), future Countess of Brederode. She was the orphaned daughter of Wirich VI, Count of Daun-Falkenstein, and his third wife, Countess Anna Margaretha of Manderscheid-Gerolstein (1575–1606), who died just two days before Philip.
