= Philip William, Prince of Orange =

Prince of Orange from 1584 to 1618

Philip William
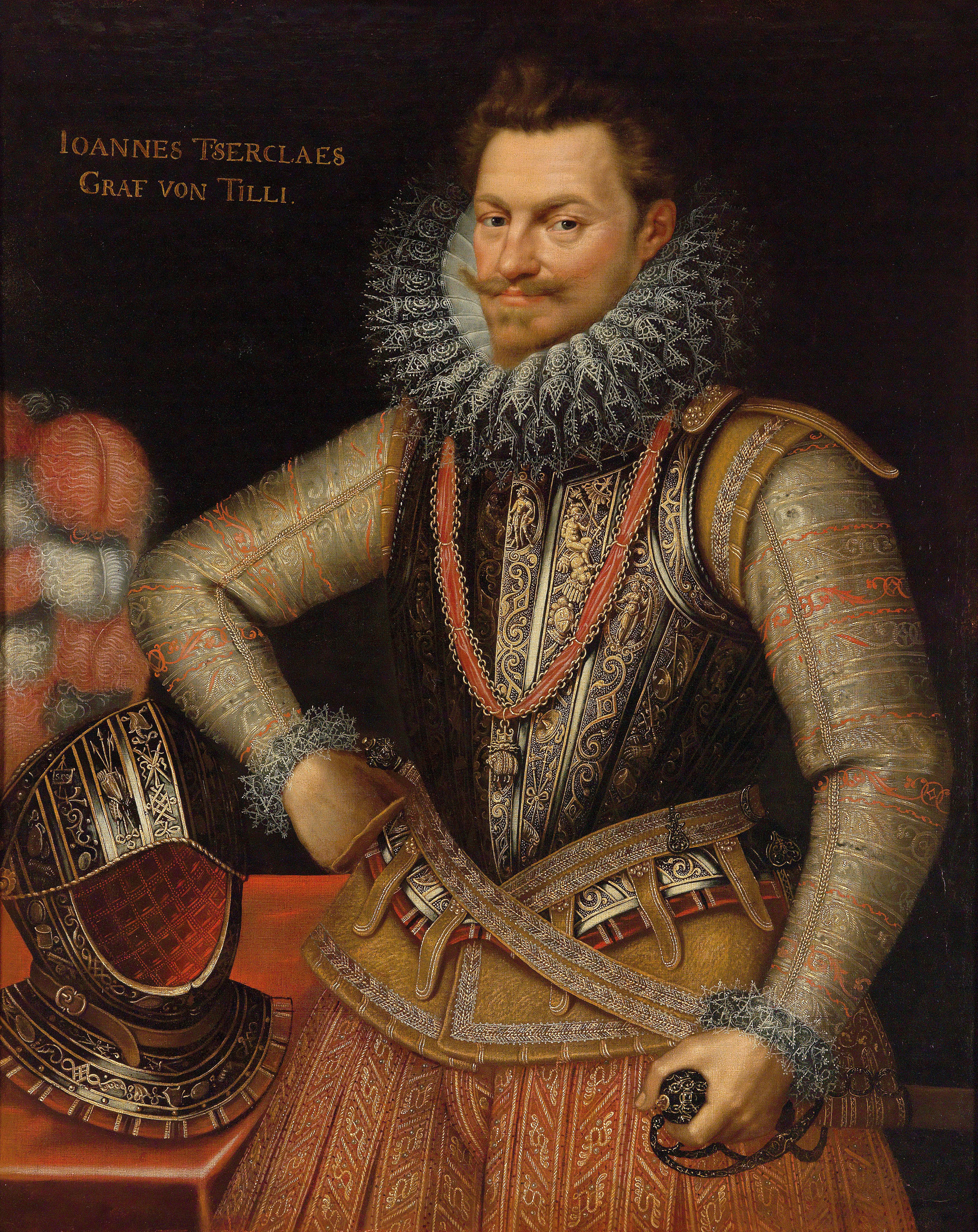
- Portrait by Frans Pourbus the Younger, 1600

Prince of Orange
- Reign: 10 July 1584 – 20 February 1618
- Predecessor: William I
- Successor: Maurice
- Born: 19 December 1554; Buren, Gelderland, Seventeen Provinces
- Died: 20 February 1618 (aged 63); Brussels, Spanish Netherlands
- Burial: Diest, Belgium
- Spouse: Éléonore de Bourbon
- House: Orange-Nassau
- Father: William the Silent
- Mother: Anna van Egmont
- Religion: Roman Catholic

Philip William, Prince of Orange (19 December 1554 in Buren, Gelderland – 20 February 1618) was the eldest son of William the Silent by his first wife Anna van Egmont. He became Prince of Orange in 1584 and Knight of the Golden Fleece in 1599.

== Biography ==
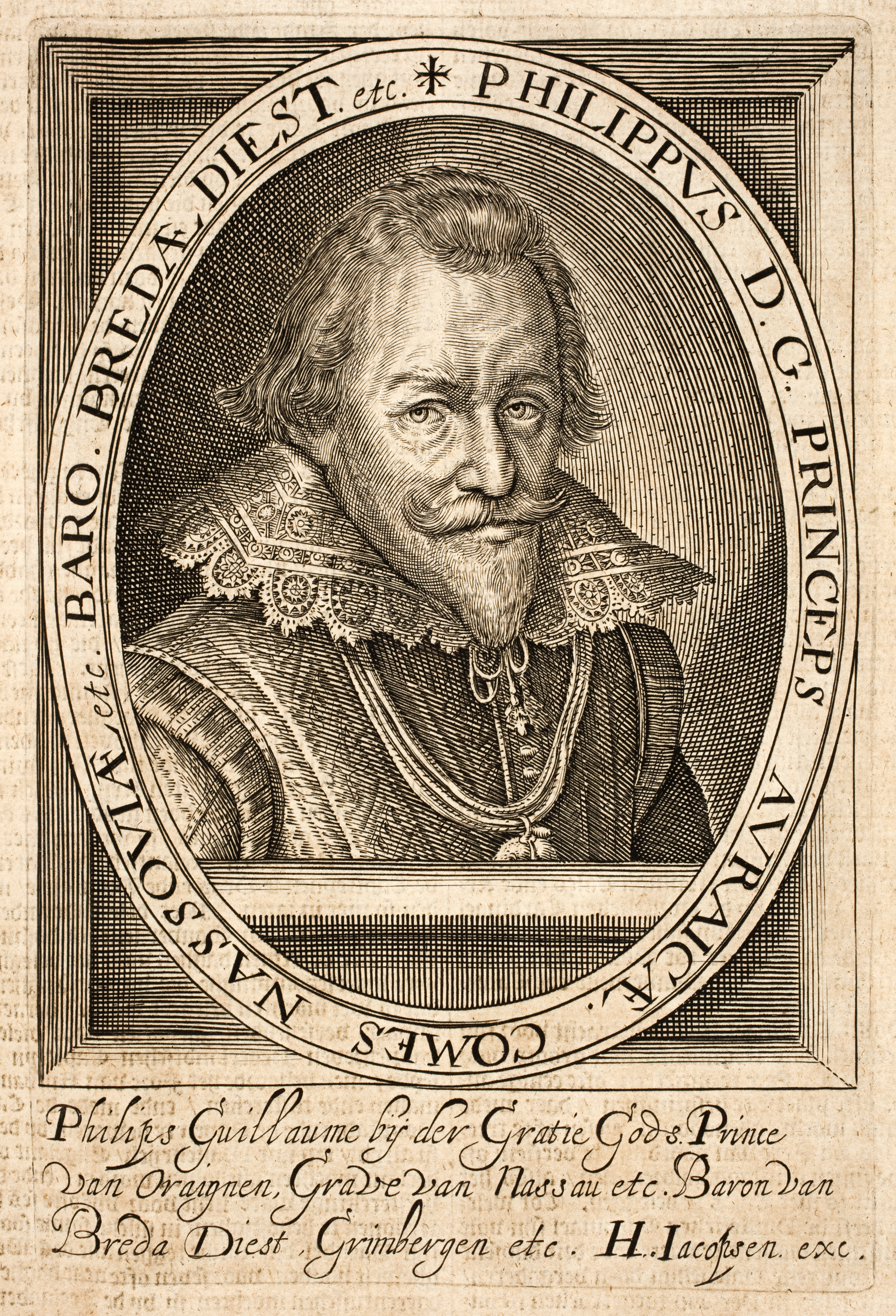
Engraving of Philip William based on Emanuel van Meteren (1535-1612), (1614)

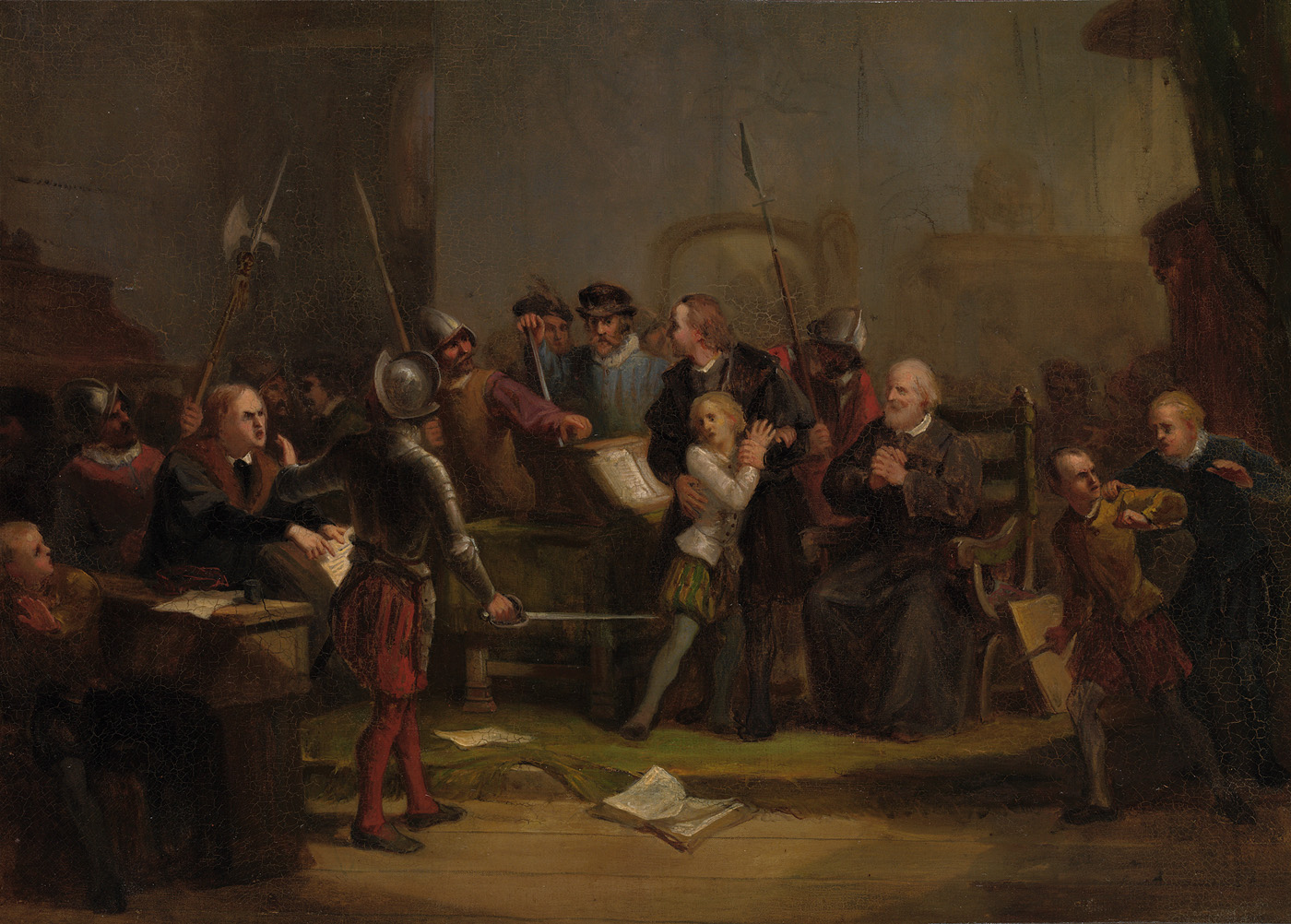
Philip William being kidnapped by the Spaniards by David Van der Kellen III (Amsterdam Museum)

Philip William, Filips Willem in Dutch, was born on 19 December 1554 in Buren, Guelders, Seventeen Provinces. He was the first son of William the Silent and Anna van Egmont.

When his father William the Silent ignored Alva's summons to return to Brussels, remaining in Germany, Philip William, only a boy of 13, was studying at the University at Leuven in Brabant. He was seized in February 1568 and taken to Spain partly as a hostage. The kidnapping was organized on the advice of Cardinal-Archbishop of Mechelen, Antoine Perrenot de Granvelle (1517-1586). He would never see his father again (his mother had already died ten years earlier).

In Spain he continued his studies at the university of Alcalá de Henares. He mainly studied languages, in which he had previously shown an interest at Leuven. Philip William spoke Latin, Spanish, French, Italian, German and Dutch fluently. No further details are known about his student life. The Spanish king's aim was to keep Philip William in Spain as long as possible in order to erase the memory of his lineage and of the Low Countries.

After completing his studies, Philip William was assigned a new residence in the castle of Arévalo, a fortified town in Ávila province. The castle of Arévalo had been built between the 12th and 16th centuries and did not offer many comforts. He was not treated as a prisoner, but was kept out of all possible political and other decisions. The prince had little or no income of his own. In addition, there was little to do in Arévalo itself. During his stay, the prince was mainly surrounded by Spanish personnel, because they wanted to avoid contact with the Netherlands as much as possible. Nevertheless, Philip William tried to make rapprochement with his father through letters, which went against the Spanish government's wishes. When a Spanish captain visiting Philip William in Spain after the assassination of his father William of Orange started to insult William, Philip William could not tolerate this and threw the Spaniard through the window. The latter did not survive the fall.

He remained in Spain until 1596 when he returned to the southern Netherlands. During his stay in Spain his interests in the Dutch Republic were vigorously handled by his sister, Maria of Nassau, against his half-brother Maurice of Nassau who contested his brother's right to the barony and city of Breda.

In 1606 Philip William was recognized in the Republic as Lord of Breda and Steenbergen, and his right to appoint magistrates was acknowledged, provided he did so maintaining the "Union and the Republic's religion". He duly made his ceremonial entry into his town of Breda in July 1610 and from then until his death, regularly appointed the magistrates in his lordship. Though he restored Catholic services in the castle of Breda, he did not try to challenge the ascendancy of the Protestant-Calvinist Reformed Church in the city. He had a difference with the States-General in 1613, when they annulled his appointment of a Catholic drost. He had to cooperate with the military governor in Breda, his illegitimate half-brother Justinus van Nassau, staunchly loyal to the States-General.

In 1606 in Fontainebleau, Philip William was married to Éléonore de Bourbon, daughter of Henry I, Prince de Condé by his wife and cousin, Princess Marie de Cleves. Born into the House of Bourbon, she was cousin of King Henry IV of France. Philip William died in 1618 without any legitimate offspring. Therefore, after his death, Prince Maurice inherited the title of Prince of Orange.

Philip William died on 20 February 1618 as a consequence of a badly administered enema which gravely injured his intestines. As Lord of Diest and a pious Catholic at the time of his death, Philip William of Orange commanded that the parish church of Saint Sulpice in the same city, should celebrate a yearly Requiem Mass for his soul. Diest is also the site of his burial in the Catholic Roman Rite. Diest is known as the "Orange City".

== Ancestors ==
Ancestors of Philip William, Prince of Orange

8. John V, Count of Nassau-Siegen
4. William I, Count of Nassau-Siegen
9. Elisabeth of Hesse-Marburg
2. William the Silent
10. Bodo III, Count of Stolberg-Wernigerode
5. Juliana of Stolberg-Wernigerode
11. Anna of Eppstein-Königstein
1.Philip William, Prince of Orange
12. Floris van Egmont
6. Maximiliaan van Egmond
13. Margaret of Glymes-Bergen
3. Anna of Egmond
14. Hugh de Lannoy
7. Françoise de Lannoy
15. Marie de Bouchout

Philip William, Prince of Orange House of Orange-Nassau Cadet branch of the House of Nassau Born: 19 December 1554 Died: 20 February 1618
Regnal titles
Preceded by William the Silent	Prince of Orange; Baron of Breda; 1584–1618	Succeeded by Maurice
