= Portrait of a Noble Young Lady (Pourbus) =

Painting by Pieter Pourbus

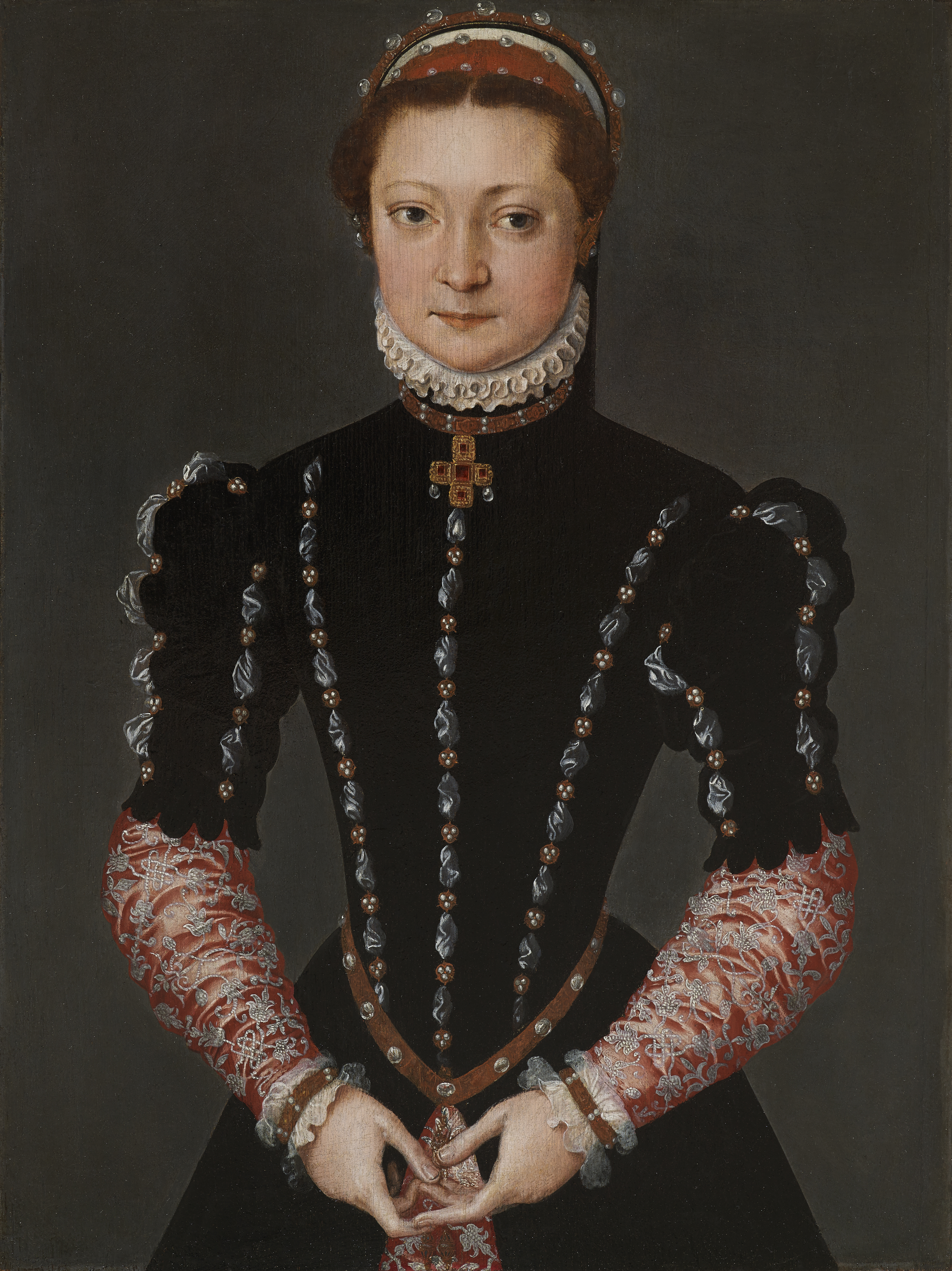
Portrait of a Noble Young Lady, 41.3 × 31.2 cm, signed and dated 1554; private collection

Portrait of a Noble Young Lady (Portret van een onbekende vrouw) is considered by many art historians, such as Paul Huvenne, former Director of the Royal Museum of Fine Arts Antwerp, (Note: For a description of Huvenne, see: "KMSKA Director Paul Huvenne to Retire on 1 August". CODART. 11 June 2014.) to be one of the best examples of Pieter Pourbus' portraiture.

Huvenne writes about it that "[Pourbus] manages to lift the striking likeness that is expected of any portrait to an icon that radiates societal and spiritual values. In doing so, he endows the person depicted with a detached, but animated beauty that leaves no one unmoved".

== Identity of the sitter ==
No inscription or family crest is to be seen on the painting, and none could be found after infrared or X-ray examination. However, the infrared photos reveal unidentified marks on the upper left hand side of the painting, which suggest that a crest or symbol was perhaps present on this side at some point (see infrared photos 1 and 2 in gallery below). It is therefore not yet possible to identify with certainty the woman depicted, but her rich dress and distinguished appearance suggests that she was of considerable standing. Her dress and its distinctive lace collar allowed Huvenne, who discovered this painting in 2006, to date the portrait as having been painted before 1560.

The infrared examination conducted before the exhibition in Bruges in 2017 confirmed Huvenne's hypothesis and revealed that Pourbus executed the portrait in 1554. Pourbus's signature, a monogram, two "P"s separated by the master's mark resembling the numeral "4", appears on the upper right hand side, together with the date 1554 (see infrared photos 3 and 4 in gallery below).

Infrared photograph 1: detail upper left

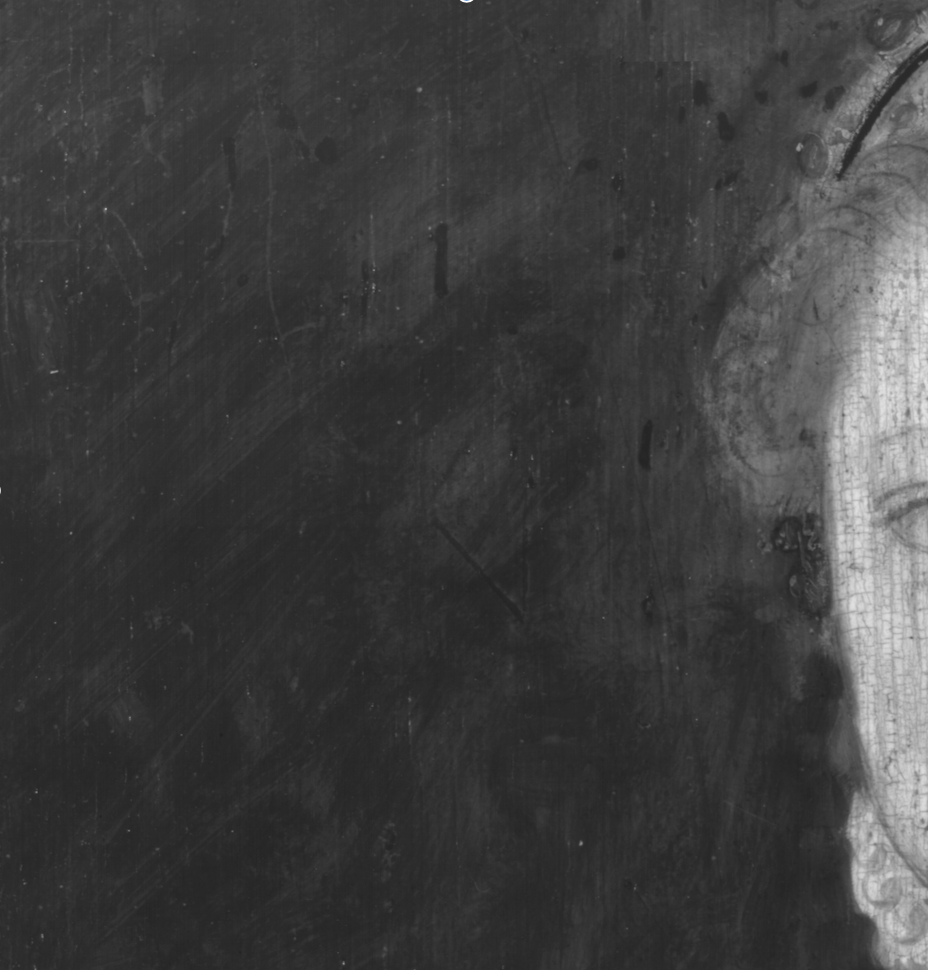
Infrared photograph 2: details upper left with unknown marks

Infrared photograph 3: detail upper right

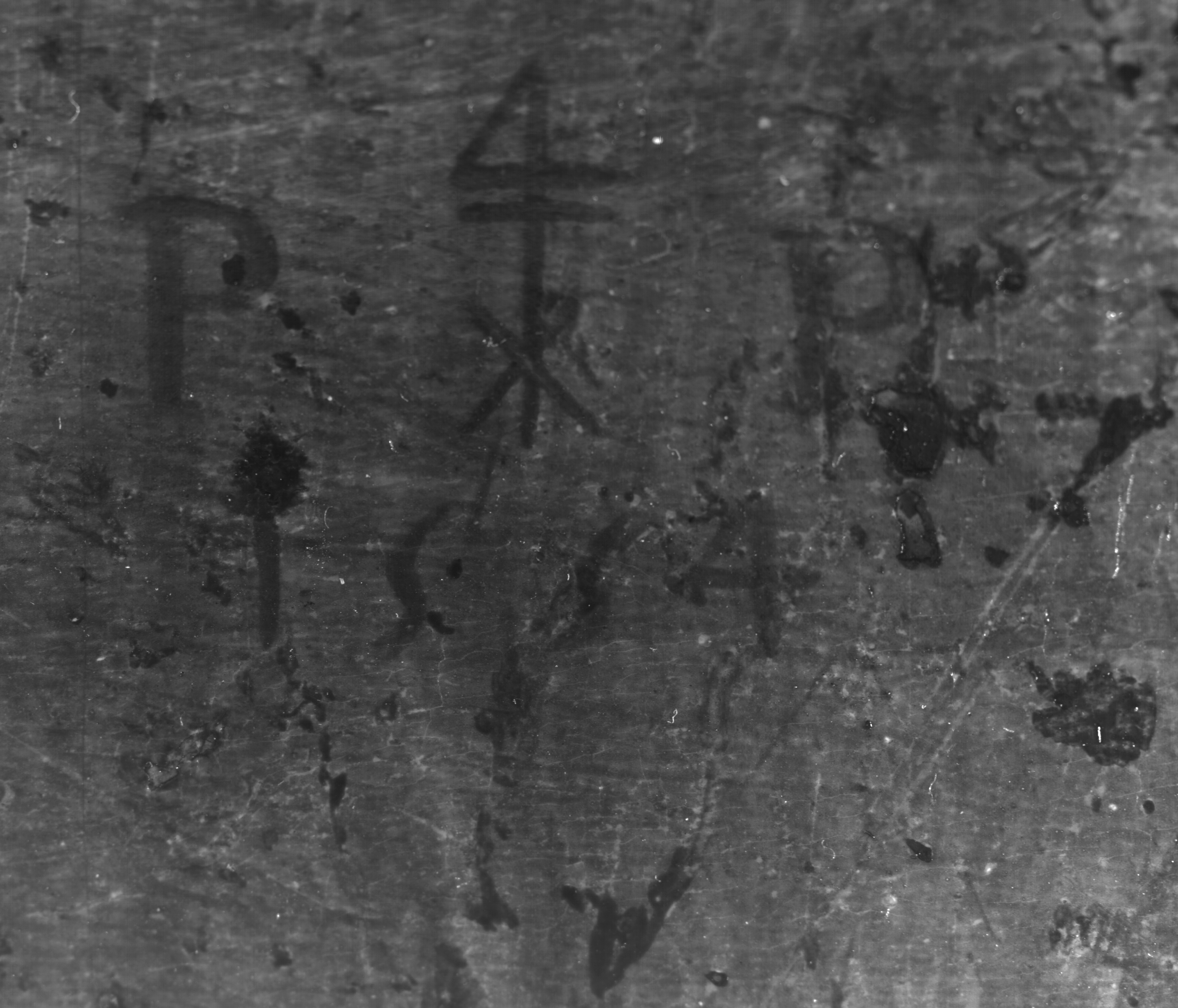
Infrared photograph 4: detail upper right, showing signature and date 1554

== Clothes and fashion in 1554 ==
The lady painted by Pourbus wears clothes according to the Spanish fashion of the time, but also with a flair for French fashion. Her high-necked gown is a ropa, which Spanish fashion spread all over Europe in the 1550s, trimmed with ruched white silk braid held in place with gold buttons.

The ropa, probably Portuguese in origin, was a sort of loose-waisted mantle open in front, in which some authors have seen the continuation of the fifteenth-century surcoat. It often had double funnel sleeves, one part of which could be worn hanging, in accordance with a purely Spanish tradition. From Portugal it spread to Spain and was soon adopted in many countries, due to the influence of Spain at the time. In the 1550s, this new garment became extremely popular across Europe. The ropa could be worn all in a loose version, and was then known under various names: the "sumarra" in Italy, the "marlotte" in France and the "vlieger" in the Low Countries.

The fitted silhouette commonly seen in the 1540s remained popular, however. Women could choose between loose ropa-style gowns and more fitted ones, such as the one our noble young lady wears.

Worth also noting is the fact that her fitting gown is black. Black clothing was particularly expensive, an intense deep black colour being costly to produce and hard to maintain over time. It was a colour much favoured at the Habsburg court and was commonly worn at weddings in the sixteenth century.

She also wears an elegant ruff. Ruffs were highly luxurious garments, a visible symbol of status and wealth, and not anyone could afford to wear it. They could also only be worn once as body heat and the weather would cause it to droop and loose shape. As a result, persons doing manual labor were not wearing them. The wearer of a ruff had also to keep chin up and assume a proud and haughty pose, which also explains why they became rapidly popular among nobility.

Her hair is not covered with the traditional white coif often seen in continental Europe, and particularly in the Seventeen Provinces at the time, which even rich merchant women would wear (such as in the Portrait of a Woman, of the Royal Museum of Fine Arts Antwerp, or also the Portrait of an Unknown Lady, holding a pomander on a Gold Chain of 1560 (see the gallery of portraits in the article about Pieter Pourbus). But she wears instead the fashionable French hood, particularly preferred by noble women, and in her case ornamented with pearls.

== Underdrawings and pentimenti ==
Pourbus had a systematic style of underdrawing, as noted and studied by Anne van Oosterwijk in her article dedicated to "Pourbus' style in terms of paint and underdrawing".

Infrared photograph 5: Detail lower arms, revealing pentimenti

Pourbus always prepared his overall compositions using long contour lines and long parallel hatching for the shadows. For darker shadows, or growing darker, he used more closely spaced hatching. For the darkest shadows, he used cross hatches.

Also in this portrait, the careful preparation of the composition is also shown by the underdrawing, which appears in some areas. These hatches are present and well visible on the portrait, even sometimes through the painting and glazes. For instance, they appear particularly on the temples and cheek of the sitter. The lines are visible on the IR photos, carefully designing the hair around the face, as well as the position of the hands.

The infrared photos also reveal interesting pentimenti on the left arm. Untouched, and beautifully preserved, they indicate that Pourbus changed his mind on the position of the sleeve while painting the portrait (see infrared photo 5).

== Publications ==
- (en) Anne Van Oosterwijk, et al. The forgotten masters. Pieter Pourbus and Bruges painting from 1525 to 1625. [Ghent]: Snoeck, [2017]. ISBN 9789461614155. Catalogue of an exhibition at the Groeningemuseum, Bruges, Oct. 13, 2017 – Jan. 21, 2018. 336 pages. With a complete description and full-page picture of the painting pp. 208,209.
- (en) (nl) Marc de Beyer and Josephina de Fouw, Pieter Pourbus: meester-schilder uit Gouda = Pieter Pourbus: Master painter of Gouda. Gouda: Museum Gouda, 2018. ISBN 9789072660121. Catalogue of the exhibition in Museum Gouda, Feb. 17 – June 17, 2108. 86 pages.
