= Anna van Egmont =

Princess of Orange from 1551 to 1558

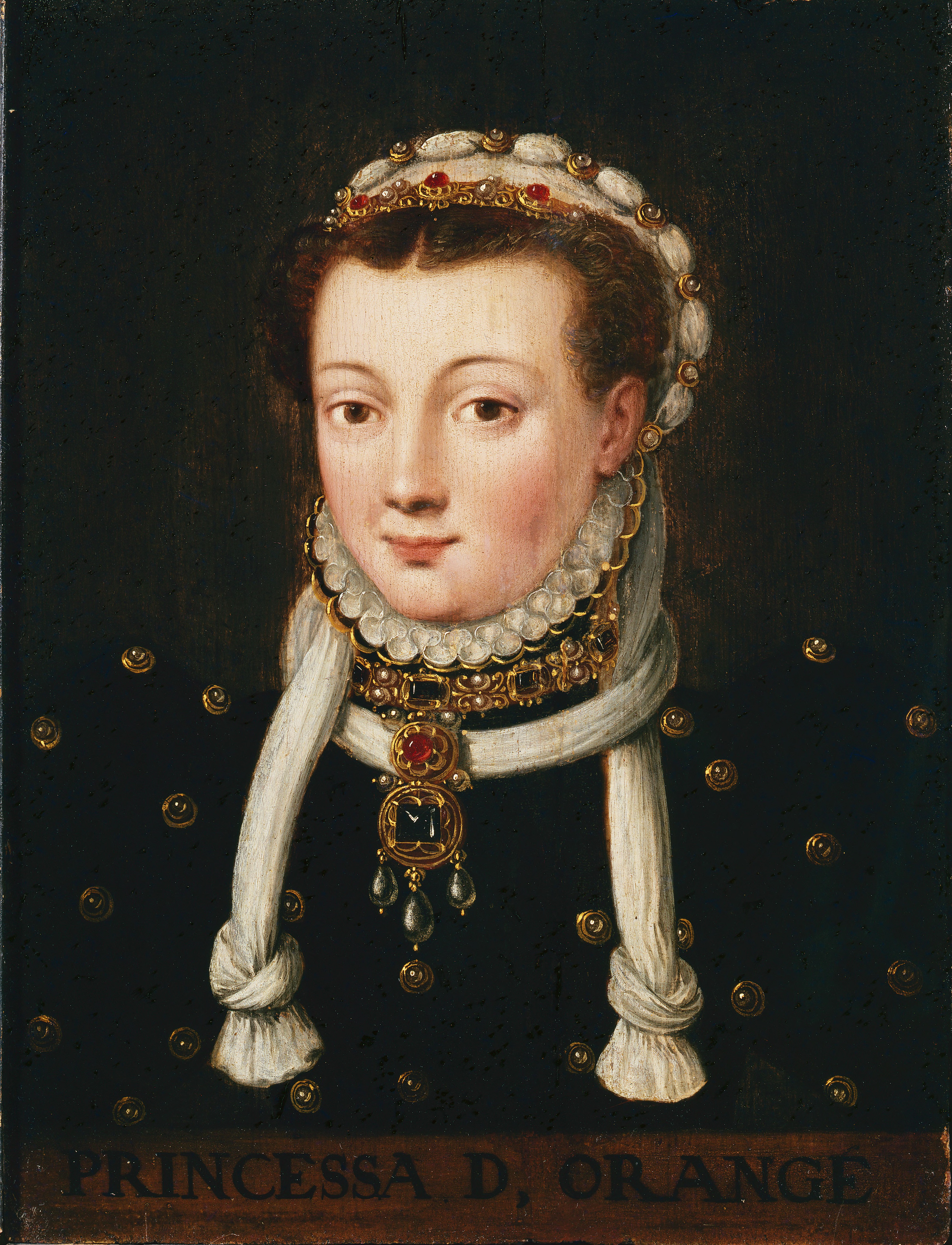
- A portrait of Anna van Egmont, possibly a copy after Antonis Mor (Dutch Royal Collections). Inscription, below: PRINCESSA D, ORANGE

Princess consort of Orange
- Tenure: 6 July 1551 – 24 March 1558

Countess of Buren Countess of Leerdam Countess of Lingen Lady of Egmond
- Tenure: 24 December 1548 – 24 March 1558
- Predecessor: Maximiliaan van Egmond
- Successor: William the Silent
- Born: March 1533; Grave, Duchy of Brabant
- Died: 24 March 1558 (aged 25); Breda, Duchy of Brabant
- Spouse: William I, Prince of Orange (m. 1551)
- Issue: Countess Maria; Philip William, Prince of Orange; Maria, Countess of Hohenlohe-Langenburg
- House: Egmond
- Father: Maximiliaan van Egmond
- Mother: Françoise de Lannoy

Anna of Egmont (March 1533 – 24 March 1558), mainly known as Anna van Buren (or Anna van Bueren), was a Dutch heiress who became the first wife of William the Silent, Prince of Orange.

== Biography ==
Anna was born in Grave, Netherlands in March 1533. She was the only child of Maximilian of Egmont, Count of Buren (1509-1548) and his wife, Françoise de Lannoy (1513-1562).

Therefore, she was suo jure Countess of Buren and Lady of Egmond. She was also Countess of Lingen and of Leerdam, and Lady of IJsselstein, of Borssele, of Grave, of Cranendonck, of Jaarsveld, of Kortgene, of Sint Maartensdijk, and of Odijk.

Both her mother and father belonged to the high nobility of the Holy Roman Empire. Maximilian's main activities were those of Charles V's army commander, first in an argument with Guelders, later in a campaign in the German areas against the Schmalkaldic League . He also played a role as a director, both as captain general and stadholder of Friesland, Groningen and Overijssel, and in his extensive possessions around Buren and in Zeeland. He was often at the Brussels court of Charles V and especially of Mary of Hungary, his sister and governor of the Netherlands. Anna and her mother usually stayed at the family castle in Buren. Given his high position, father Maximilian was on good terms with Charles V (1500-1558), then Emperor of the Holy Roman Empire, king of Spain and landlord of the Habsburg Netherlands and his sister, Mary of Hungary (1505-1558), governor of the Habsburg Netherlands.

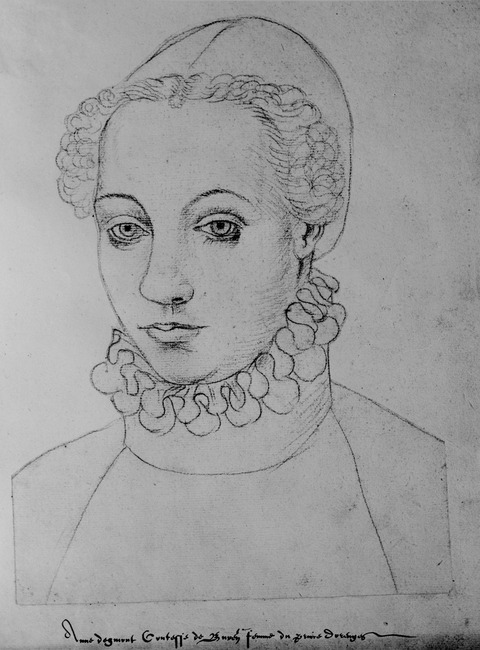
Anna van Egmont in the Recueil d'Arras

Anna grew up in a noble entourage, the center of which was the court of the governor in Brussels. The spoken language was French, the language that Anna learned in addition to Dutch and in which she would later correspond with William of Orange, better known later as William the silent. Whether and how she was prepared for the administration of the vast estates and wonderful rights belonging to the County of Buren is unknown. Her father died quite unexpectedly at the court in Brussels in 1548, reportedly dressed in full armor and surrounded by his confidants, but in the absence of his wife and daughter. On his deathbed, Maximilian arranged the marriage of William of Nassau, Prince of Orange, one of the most prominent young noblemen of the time and of the same age as his daughter. Anna succeeded Maximiliaan as Countess van Buren. She was only fifteen years old and one of the most desirable partners in the marriage market. Charles V and Mary of Hungary supported the commitment.

On 8 July 1551 she married William the Silent in Buren, and thereby he earned the titles Lord of Egmond and Count of Buren. The couple settled in the family castle in Breda, but Anna was often alone there with the three children she had there. Anna van Egmont had three children with William the Silent:

- Countess Maria of Nassau (22 November 1553 – after 23 July 1555), named after Mary of Hungary (1505-1558), governor of the Habsburg Netherlands, died in infancy.
- Philip William, Prince of Orange (19 December 1554 – 20 February 1618), named after the lord and Williams father, married Eleonora of Bourbon-Condé, but did not have children.
- Countess Maria of Nassau (7 February 1556 – 10 October 1616), who was named after her deceased sister, married Count Philip of Hohenlohe-Neuenstein, did not have children.

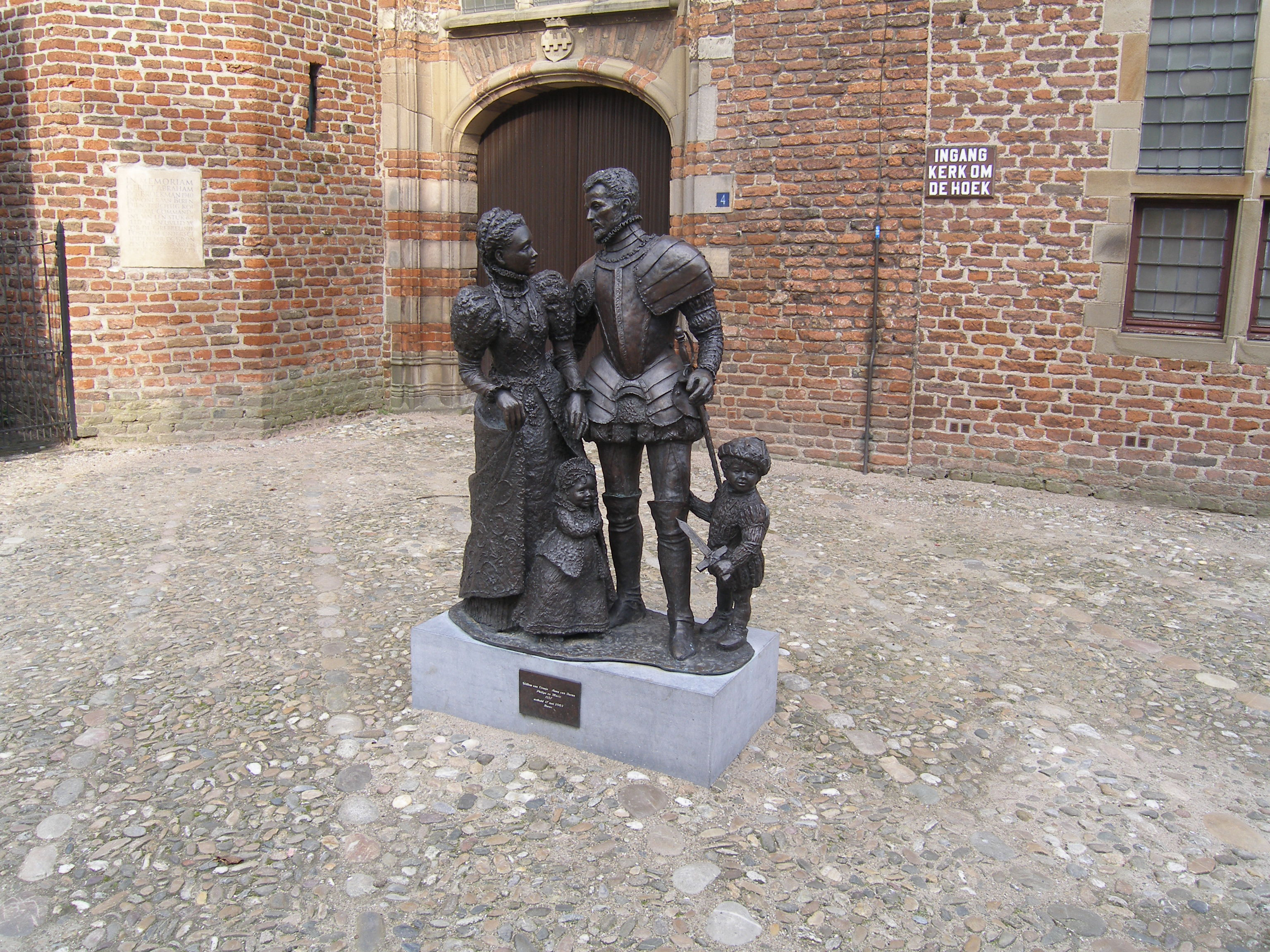
Statue of Anna, William, Maria and Philip William in Buren

William was often at the court, but also at the front in Hainaut and Artois, as commander of the army in the wars with France.

Forty seven letters from William to Anna have been preserved. Her letters to him have been lost. The letters mainly breathe an atmosphere of domesticity and also affection. Several times William expresses his appreciation for the way in which Anna handles his affairs during his absence. William wrote most letters to Anna when he was in an army camp.

Anna rarely followed her husband on a journey. Only when he was summoned in 1555 to receive Philip II as new sovereign, did William ask Anna if she would also come to Brussels.

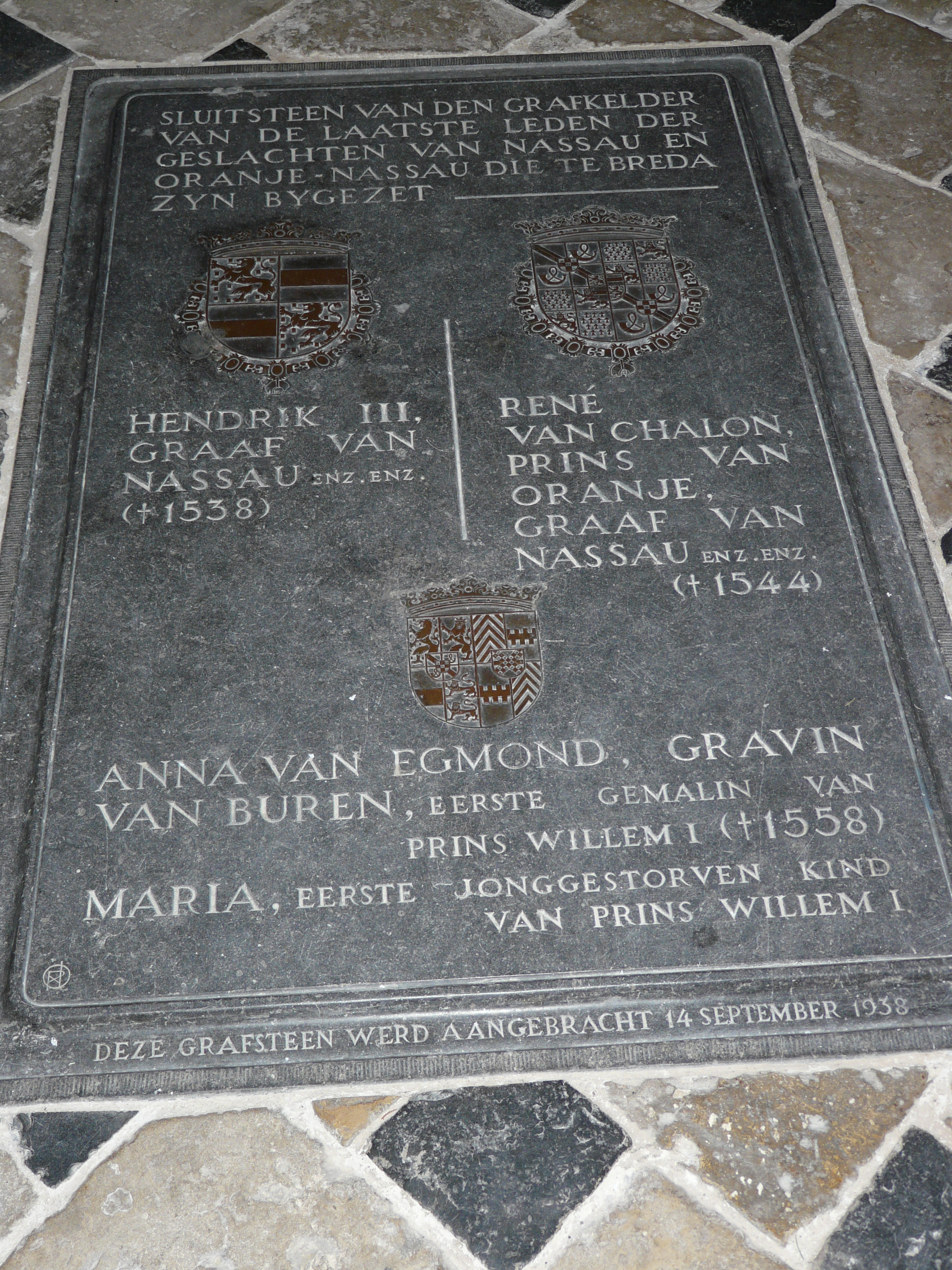
Anna van Buren's grave in Breda

At the beginning of 1558 Anna was supposed to go to Dillenburg with William, but because of her illness the trip was canceled. She died of the disease in March of that year.

She was regretted by William, who also fell ill shortly after her death. He received condolences from many dignitaries, including Philip II, who sent a messenger to comfort him. At that time there was no question of removal between the Orange and the lord. Anna van Egmond was interred in a chapel of the Grote Kerk in Breda.

Her son Philip William inherited the county of Buren. He later left it to his half-brother Maurits, making it part of the heritage of the Oranje-Nassaus.

== The portraits of Anna van Egmont ==
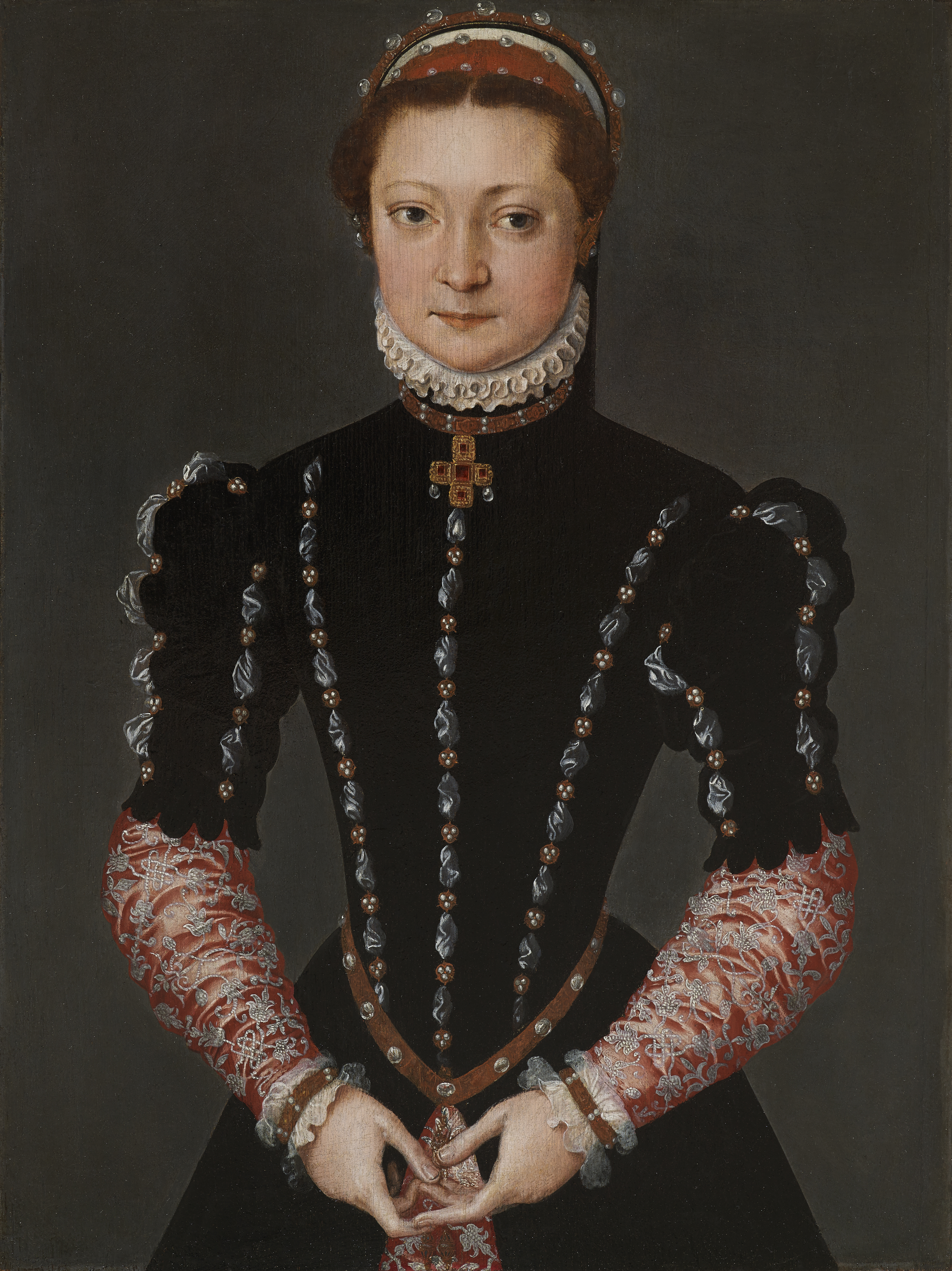
Portrait of a young noblewoman, 41.3 x 31.2cm, signed and dated 1554, private collection

The only painting depicting Anna van Egmont in the Royal Collections of the Netherlands is considered to be one of the copies of a lost painting by Antonis Mor.

A portrait that was painted by Pieter Pourbus, Portrait of a Noble Young Lady, was exhibited for the first time in 2017 in Bruges, then at the Gouda museum in 2018.

=== Portraits, possibly copies after Antonis Mor ===
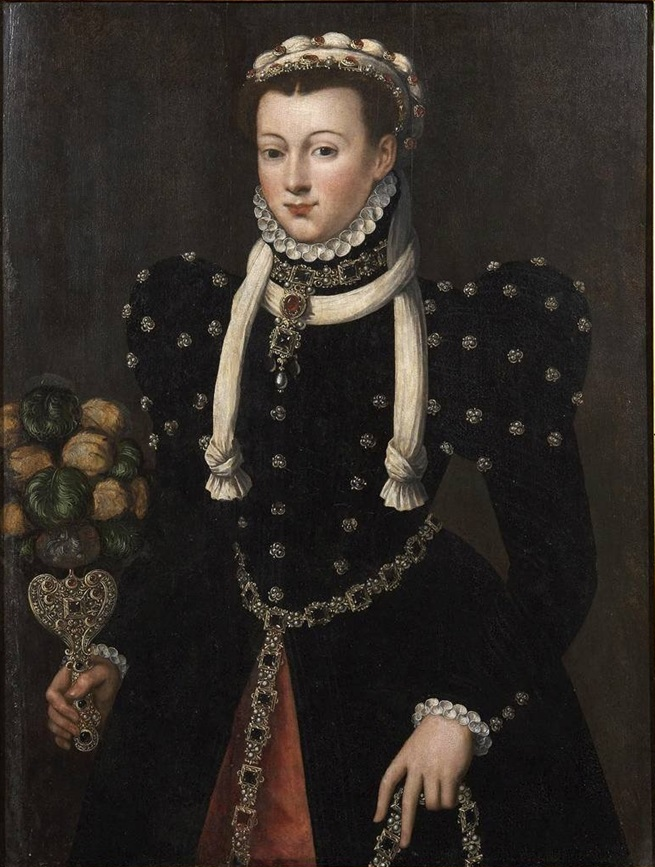
1. 88 x 65 cm – Ducal Palace of Mantua, Italy

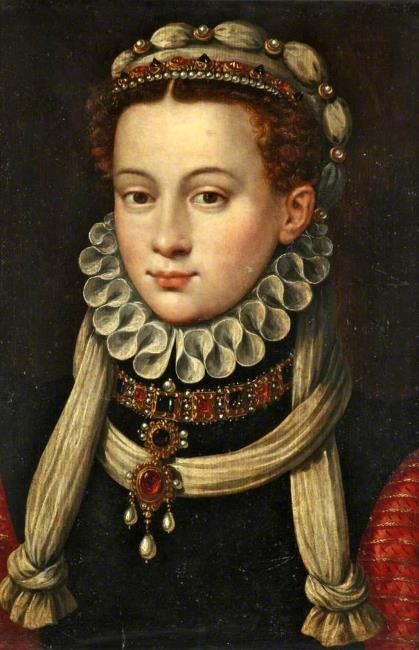
2. 48,5 x 35,5 cm – Walker Art Gallery, Liverpool, England

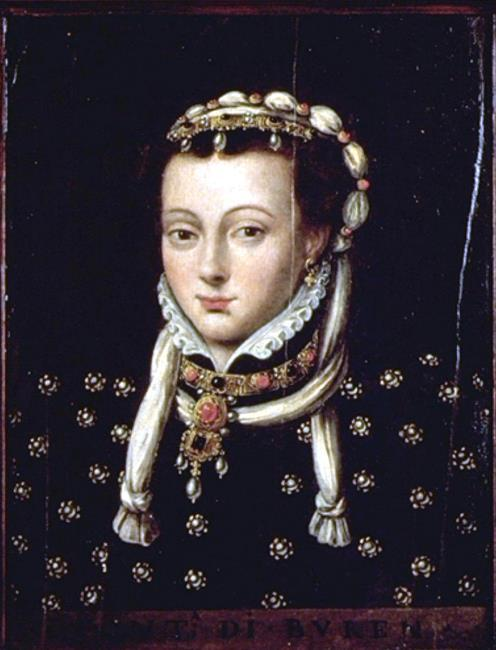
3. 28 x 22 cm – Museum of the Chartreuse de Douai, Douai, France

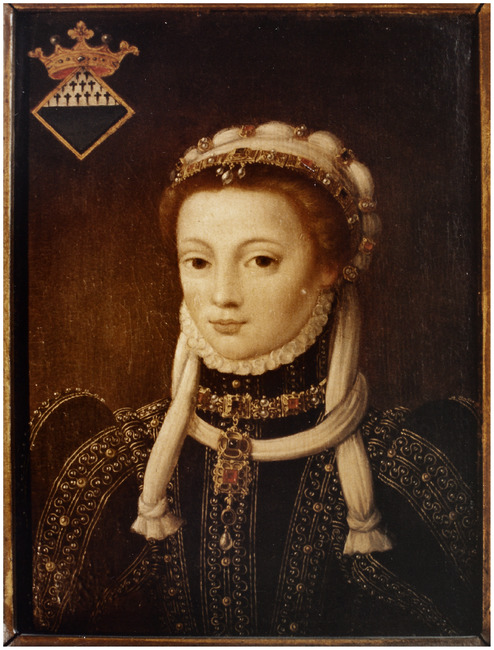
4. 29 x 22 cm – Private collection, Brussels, Belgium

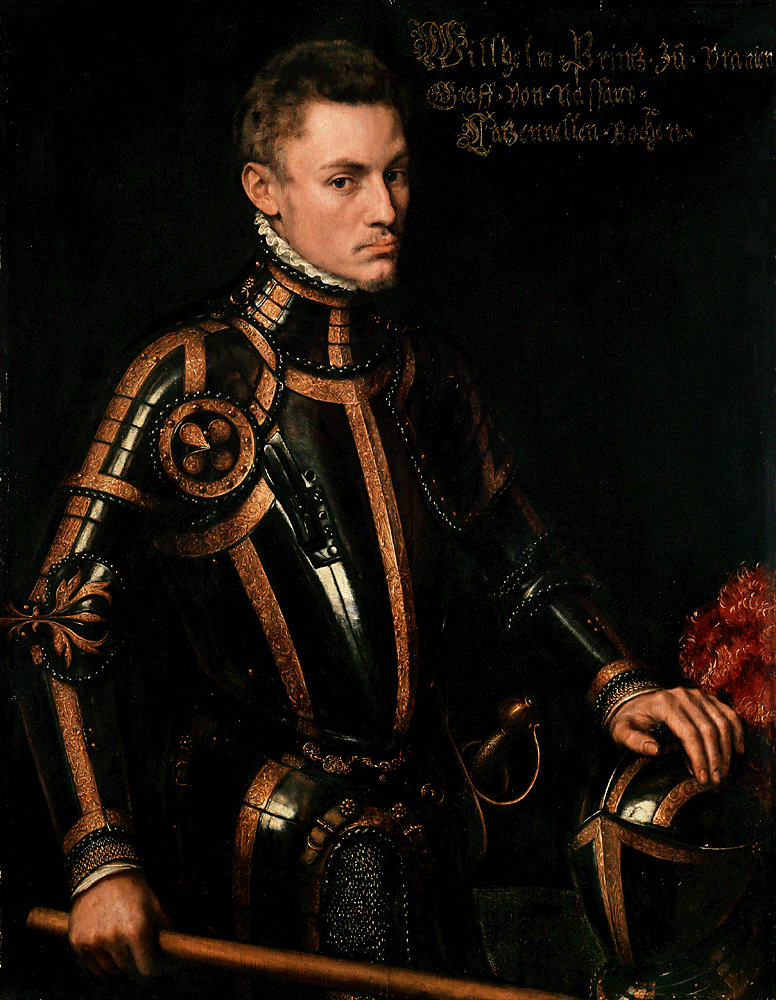
William of Orange in Armour (1555) by Mor, 115 x 82cm, Museumslandschaft Hessen Kassel

Although these portraits have all different sizes and show different or change of details in the gown (a spanish style ropa), they all seem to copy the same face, scarf (écharpe) and position of the scarf. The coif is also always a French hood, and seems to be the same depicted on all four copies, although with changing details and/or added or changed jewels from one to the other copy.

- Portrait 1., which is to be seen in the Ducal Palace of Mantua (Italy), is the largest. Depicting the sitter in half length, it is the only one showing her hands. It has also added to her right hand a gold and finely chiseled fan with yellow, red and green colored ostrich feathers. Worth noting is that her left hand shows no ring. The original of this portrait is a possible pendant to an original portrait of William by Antonis Mor, according to Luttervelt.
- Portrait 2. was in the private collection of William Hall Walker (1st Baron Wavertree), Liverpool (England), and bequeathed by him in 1933 to the Walker Art Gallery, Liverpool (England).
- Portrait 3., now in the Museum of the Chartreuse de Douai, in Douai (France), shows an inscription, below on the frame: CONT/A DI BUREN
- Portrait 4. shows on the upper left the coat of arms of Lichtervelde.

A version of the same portrait, from the collection of Count d'Andlau at the castle of Voré, Remalard (Orne, in France), shows yet other variations in the dress and the jewels. Here the princess wears large, oval pareis in her ears. This time the caption is: "Prin = d, Orange".

Two other possible portraits have been identified and cited in the article called "The Klabin portrait".
