= Floris van Egmont =

Dutch stadtholder (1470–1539)

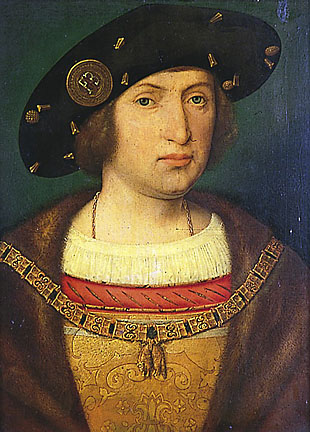
Floris van Egmont as Knight of the Golden Fleece

Coat of Arms

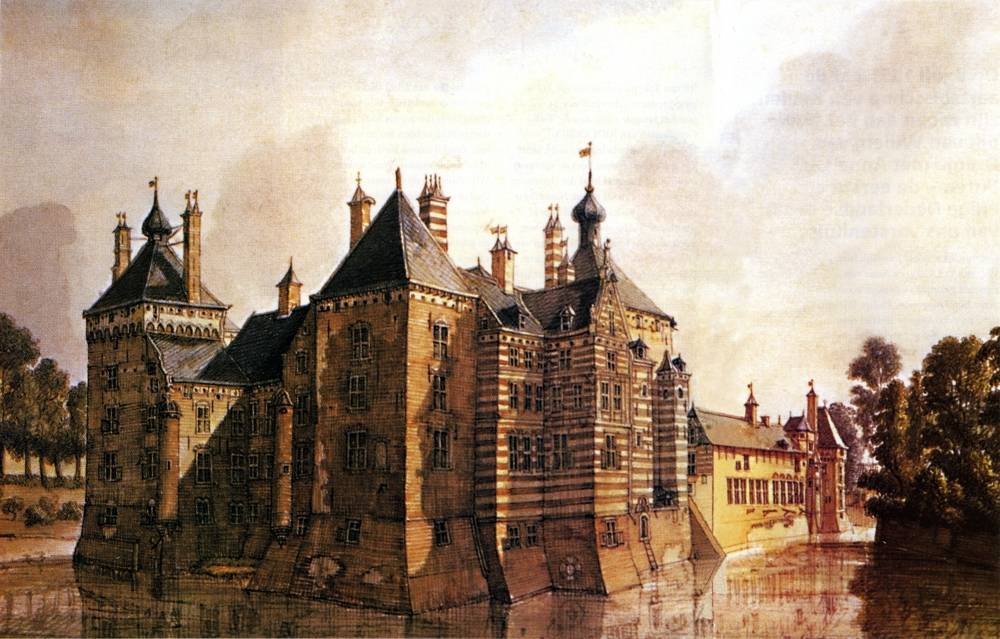
Buren castle, residence of Floris van Egmond

Floris van Egmond (ca. 1470 – 25 October 1539) was count of Buren and Leerdam and Lord of IJsselstein and Sint Maartensdijk. He was stadtholder of Guelders (1507–1511) and Friesland (1515–1518)

Floris was the son of Frederik van Egmond and Aleida van Culemborg. His career started in the 1490s as a chamberlord in the royal household of Philip I of Castile. After Philip's death, Floris gained a seat in the Court Council of Margaret of Habsburg, at the time the governor of the Netherlands. In 1505, he was knighted in the Order of the Golden Fleece.

As a stadtholder of Guelders, he represented the Habsburg government in the parts of Guelders owned by Magaretha.

In 1515, he became stadtholder of Friesland, when it was sold by George, Duke of Saxony to Habsburg. George of Saxony had failed to subdue Friesland during the Guelders Wars, and Floris controlled only a few cities (Leeuwarden, Harlingen and Franeker).

Floris was also a commander in arms. In 1523, he was appointed commander of the Dutch troops for an invasion of France during the Italian War of 1521–1526. In 1536, Floris became Captain-General of the Army that was present in the northern parts of the Low Countries.

Floris van Egmond married Margaret of Glymes-Bergen, daughter of Cornelis of Glymes, on 12 October 1500. They had two children:

- Maximiliaan van Egmond would also become stadtholder of Friesland. Maximiliaan's daughter Anna van Egmont the Younger married William of Orange in 1551.
- Anna van Egmont the Elder married Joseph of Montmorency and John of Horn. She was the mother of Philip de Montmorency, Count of Horn and Floris of Montmorency.
