= Egmond Castle =

Ruined medieval castle in the Netherlands, ancestral seat of the House of Egmond

- Kasteel Egmond
- Egmond aan den Hoef, the Netherlands
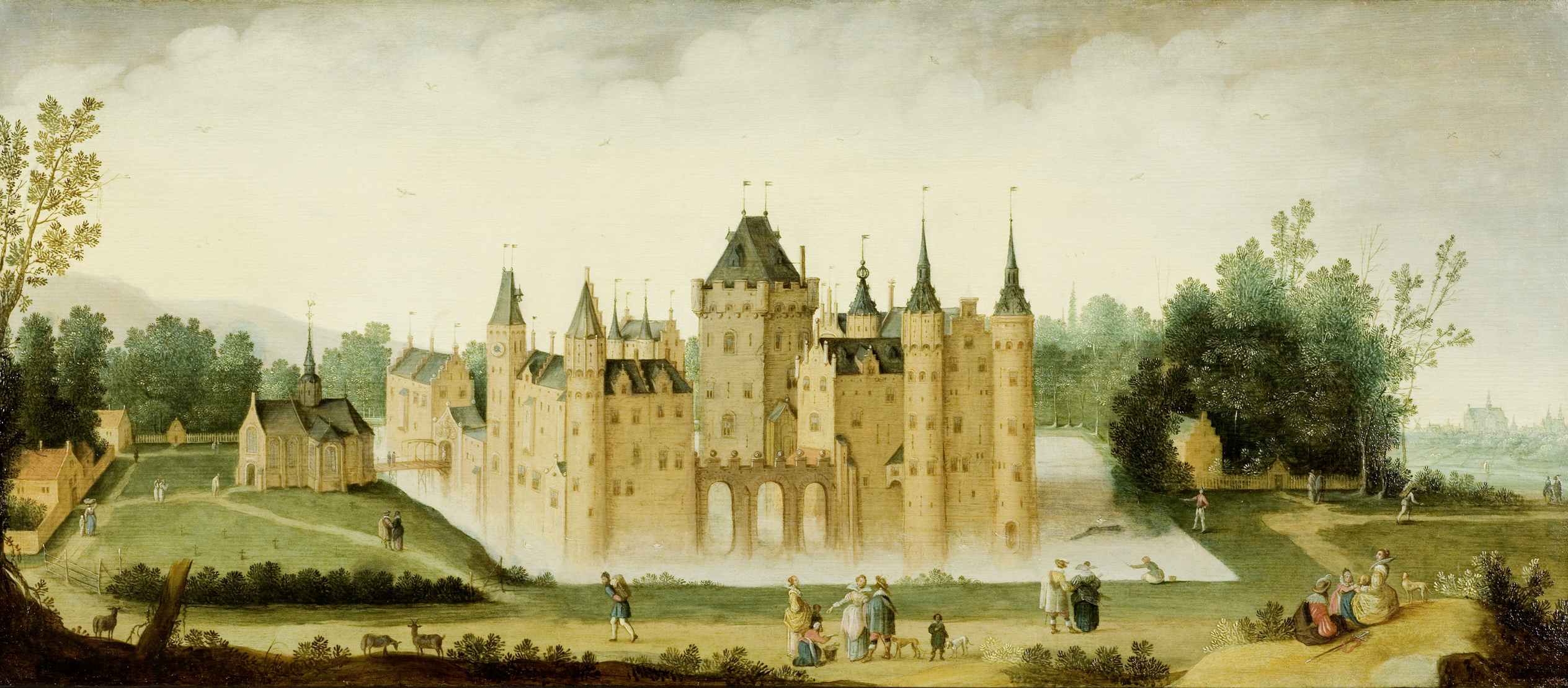
- Kasteel Egmond by Claes Jacobsz van der Heck (1638)

Site information
- Type: Water Castle
- Open to the public: Yes
- Condition: Restored ruins

Location
- North Holland
- Location within North Holland
- Coordinates: 52.621955°N 4.654175°E

Egmond Castle (Dutch: Kasteel Egmond), locally known as Slot op den Hoef and also called the Ruins of Egmond (Dutch: Ruïne van Egmond), is a ruined medieval castle in Egmond aan den Hoef, in the municipality of Bergen in the Dutch province of North Holland. It lies about 7 kilometres (4.3 mi) west of Alkmaar. It was the ancestral seat of the Egmond family, whose members became sovereign Dukes of Guelders, Counts of Egmond and Princes of Gavere, Counts of Buren and Leerdam.

The castle grew out of the fortified farmstead of the stewards of Egmond Abbey, who were appointed from 1129. After this was burned in 1205, it was replaced by a circular stone castle, which in the 14th and 15th centuries gave way to a large square castle with an extensive outer bailey, regarded as one of the largest and most beautiful castles in Holland.

In 1573, during the Eighty Years' War, Geuzen troops set it on fire to keep it out of Spanish hands. The ruins were sold for demolition in 1798 and had almost completely disappeared by 1838. In the 1930s the foundations were excavated and raised just above ground level; together with a single wall fragment of the steward's tower, they form the ruins that can be seen today. The site is a national monument of the Netherlands.

== History ==
=== Origins ===
The origins of Egmond Castle are closely connected to Egmond Abbey in Egmond-Binnen, founded in the 10th century by the counts of Holland. As the abbey's lands expanded, the abbot in 1129 entrusted part of them to a wealthy farmer named Berwout (or Barwout), who became the abbey's steward (rentmeester), also described as its advocatus. Berwout settled on a farmstead (hoeve) north of the abbey. This fortified farmstead of the first Lords of Egmond gave the village of Egmond aan den Hoef its name. The stewardship became hereditary, and according to tradition Berwout's descendant Dodo was richly rewarded for his part in the crusades, after which the territory was raised to a lordship.

=== The First Castle (c. 1100–1203) ===
Little is known about the first castle of the Lords of Egmond. In the 1930s, Wouter Braat discovered signs of earlier habitation under the later main castle. He found remains of an old palisade, and also some very heavy oak piles with burned heads. Jaap Renaud thought it possible and tempting to consider these the remains of the first castle. It is not known when the first castle was built; proposed dates range from about 1050 to 1150.

Whether the first Egmond Castle was a motte-and-bailey castle has been debated. This hypothesis would imply that the motte was later levelled, which could explain the absence of debris and building remains on the site of the later round water castle. Renaud and P. Beelaerts van Blokland saw no compelling reason to assume that a motte had existed on the site.

Walter I, Lord of Egmond, nicknamed Kwade Wouter ("Wicked Walter"), became involved in the Loon War, a war of succession over the County of Holland and its dependency Zeeland from 1203 to 1206, brought on by the death of Count Dirk VII. During this war, the faction of Louis II, Count of Loon set the fortified manor on fire in 1205.

=== The Second Castle (1206–c.1300) ===
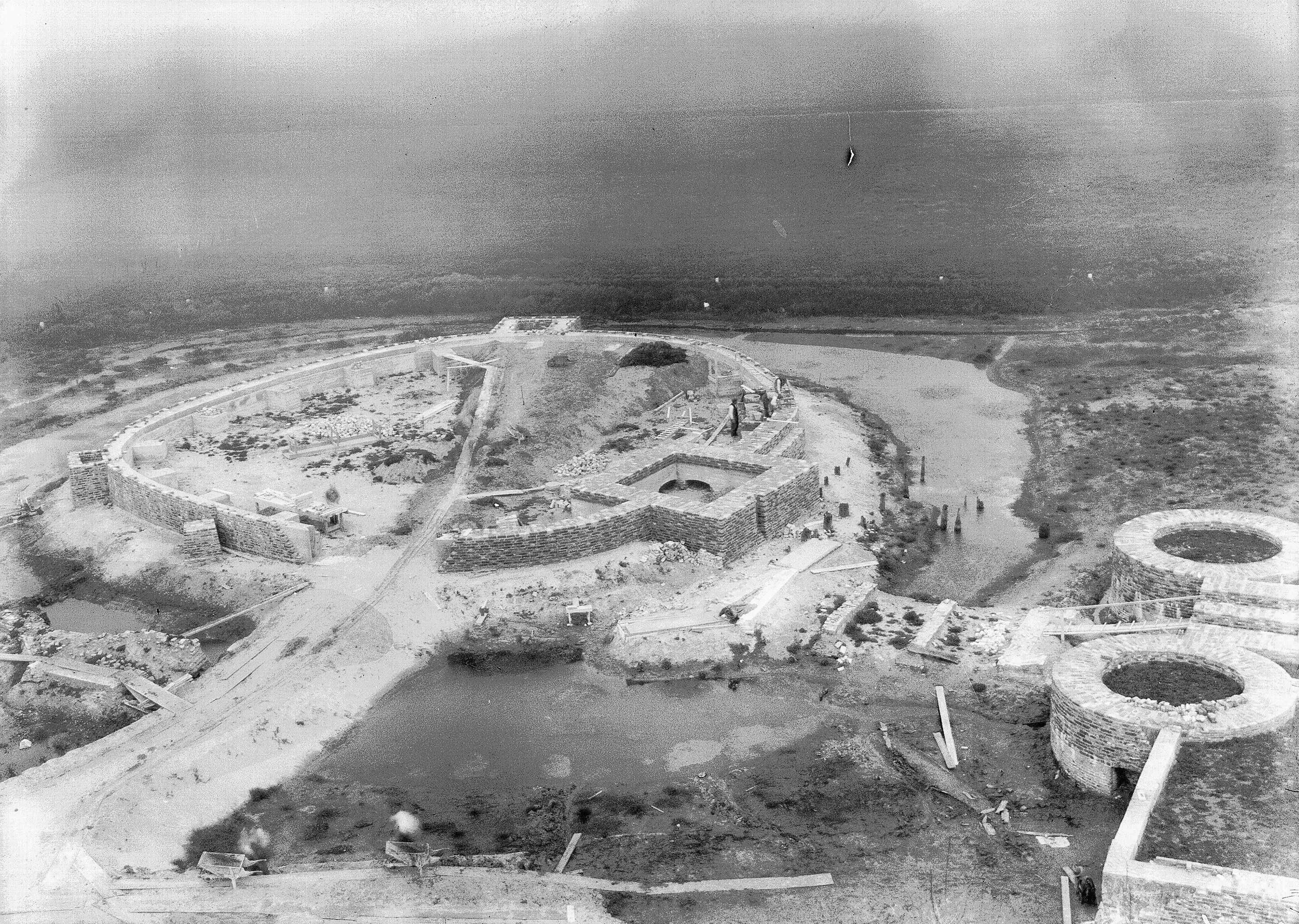
The circular second castle during the 1930s excavations

Walter I or his successor decided to build a circular stone castle as a replacement.

The second castle was a round water castle. It formed a far from perfect circle, with a minimum diameter of 27 metres and a maximum diameter of 29 metres. The curtain wall was 0.76–1 m thick and stood in the moat. On the inside there were buttresses, which left a space of 3.20–4 m between them. These spaces were spanned by arches that supported a circular walkway. On the south side there was a strong tower house, which probably doubled as a gatehouse. Later a smaller but strong tower was added on the northeast side. The smaller and lighter tower on the northwest side was also a later addition.

The main purpose of the circular castle was to serve as a place of refuge and defence in times of peril. No traces of buildings were found inside the circular castle. The main living quarters must therefore have stood on what was then the outer bailey. Egmond Castle was first mentioned in 1228. In 1285, Floris V, Count of Holland confirmed that Sir Willem van Egmond was allowed to harbour fugitives from the law of Holland at his house near Rynegom, and on the hoeve (farm) where his house stood.

The church next to the castle was begun at the same time as the round water castle. Renaud deduced this from the bricks used: the oldest measured 29–31 times 14.5 times 8 cm, which dates the church to the early 13th century as well. Later bricks used in the church resembled those of the second phase of the third castle.

One source states that Egmond Castle was destroyed in 1315. If so, the circular castle would have been destroyed in that year. Renaud thought it more likely that this happened during the rebellions after the death of Count Floris V. In either case, a wall fragment recovered from the northwest moat could be a remnant of the destruction. The distance between the round castle and the new (third) castle makes it likely that the round castle fell out of use around 1300. The existence of the circular water castle was then forgotten until it was rediscovered in the 1930s.

=== The Third Castle: the First Building Phase (first half 14th century) ===
View of Egmond Abbey and Egmond Castle by Claes Jacobsz van der Heck (1635), and now in the collection of the Alkmaar City Museum

The third castle was constructed in two phases. It replaced the old circular castle and was built on what is thought to have been its outer bailey. This former outer bailey was divided into a western and an eastern part. The first phase saw the construction of a new, small square main castle on the eastern half. It had a large tower house, often called the donjon.

The tower house was built around 1330 and had walls 2.10–3 m thick. Parts of the northwest and southwest curtain walls were built at about the same time. In the foundations there were some yellow bricks of 30 times 15 times 8 cm, and some of the outer faces were covered in mortar. This indicated that bricks from the round castle had been reused in the foundations of the tower house and some of the adjoining walls. The northern end of the old wall, with a loose piece of old foundation, probably indicates that the courtyard of the third castle was initially smaller. The southern end of the old wall points in the same direction and showed clear traces of a gate.

When the third castle was built, there were not yet any stone buildings on the elongated outer bailey. This was deduced from differences in the bricks used and from the layout of the later fortification of the outer bailey.

Walter II, Lord of Egmond (c. 1283–1321) went on an expedition to Flanders with 60 men in 1315. He may have begun the third castle, but his son John I, Lord of Egmond (1310–1369) is also a likely candidate. John I was a leader of the Cod faction during the Hook and Cod wars.

=== The Third Castle: the Second Building Phase (second half 14th century) ===
18th-century floor plan of Egmond Castle, showing the third castle; by then the second castle had been forgotten

The second construction phase of the third castle took place in the second half of the 14th century. At the small main castle, the northwest and southwest walls were extended to create a larger, but still modest, square castle. A new tower at the southeast corner had walls 1.10 m thick. The bricks used in this part measured 27.5–28 times 13.5–14.5 times 6.5–7.5 cm.

The new outer bailey was fortified during the same phase. Its southern wall and most of its eastern and western walls date from this period. The round southwest tower and the square northwest tower, later known as the steward's tower (rentmeestertoren), were also built at this time. A single wall fragment of this tower is the only part of the castle still standing above ground today.

The second building phase can be linked to the growing wealth of the Lords of Egmond. John I, Lord of Egmond (1310–1369) married the wealthy heiress Guida (Gyote) of IJsselstein, and their son Arnold I became Lord of both Egmond and IJsselstein. The chronicler Wouter van Gouthoeven credited Arnold with building most of Egmond Castle. Renaud related this above all to the fortification of the outer bailey.

=== Third Castle: the Third Building Phase (c. 1450-1525) ===
John III of Egmont (1438–1516), who was raised to the rank of Count of Egmont in 1486, was an important statesman in the Burgundian Netherlands. He decided to enlarge and decorate the castle. He was also the last Lord of Egmond to regard Egmond Castle as his residence. Many writers called it the largest and most beautiful castle in Holland.

During this phase, a great hall was built, probably on the eastern side of the main castle. It held a portrait gallery of the Lords of Egmond. The moat between the main castle and the outer bailey was closed off: on the southern side by a dam with three arches, on the northern side by one with two arches, with piles beneath them. Some buildings of the main castle were also extended into the moat.

Around 1500 a large gatehouse was added to the outer bailey. With its four towers, it was a fortress in its own right. In the first half of the 16th century, a large hall for the servants was built on the outer bailey. During the excavation a sandstone lion and two lead dragons were found near the gatehouse.

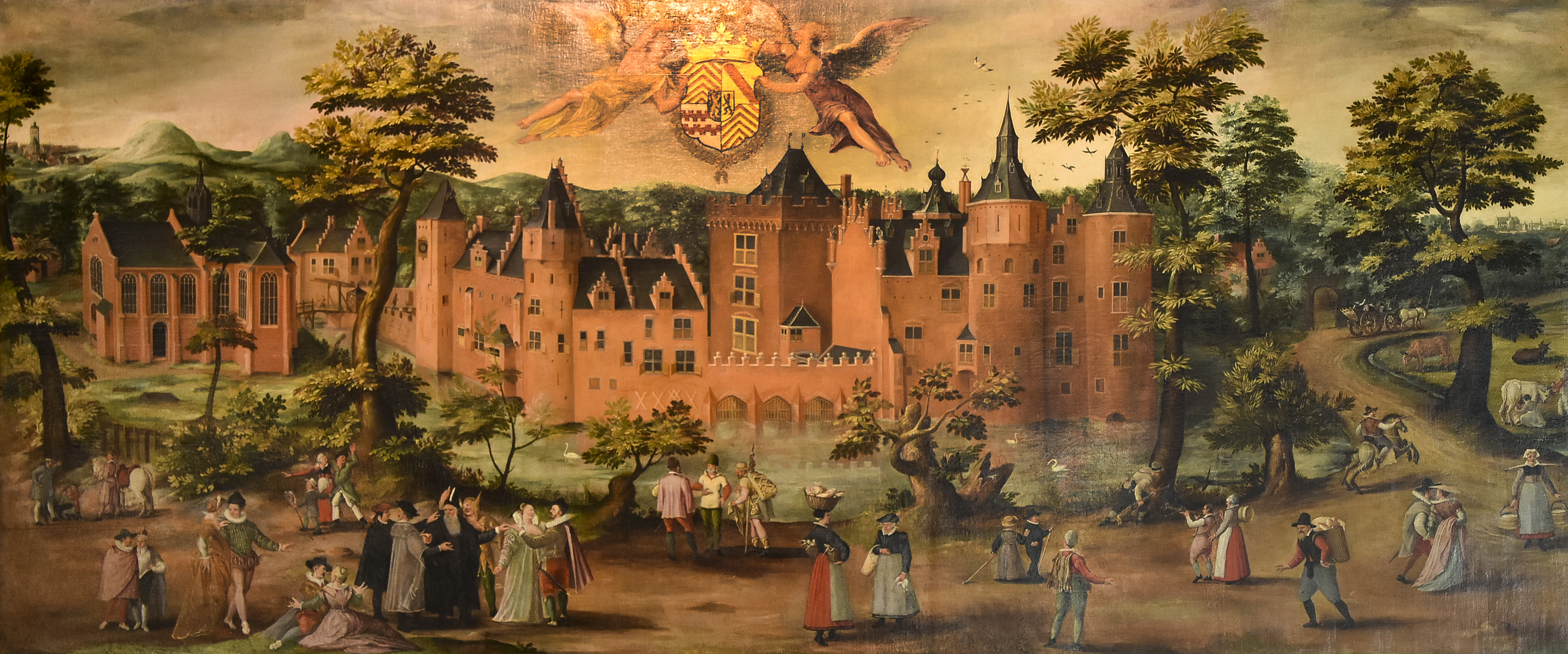
Egmond Castle around 1570 by Gillis de Saen, at view in the town hall of Zottegem. This is the oldest view of the castle in its heyday

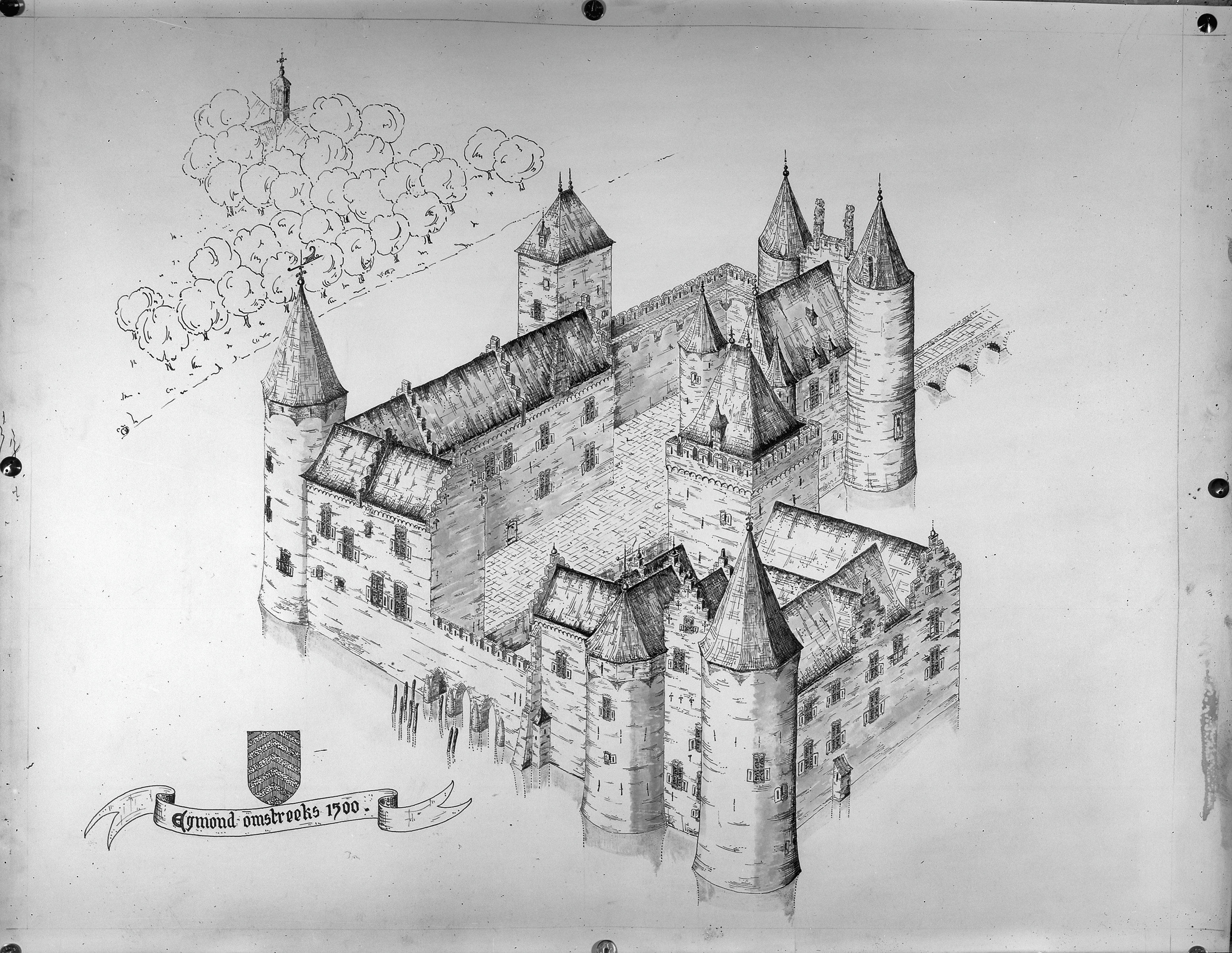
A reconstruction of Egmond Castle around 1500

Egmond castle in its heyday

Reconstruction by G W Berckhout (1653)

=== Decline and Destruction (16th century) ===
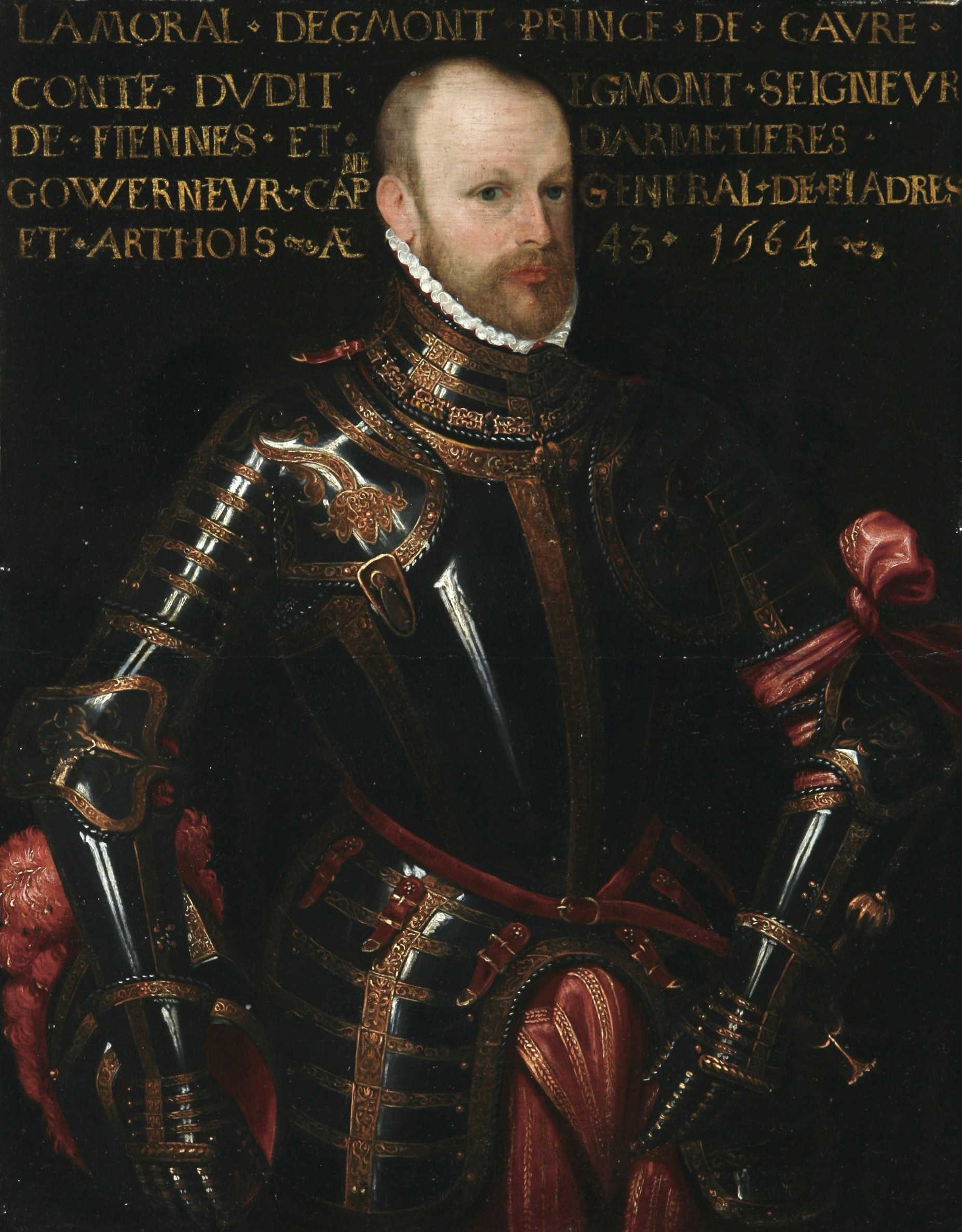
Lamoraal I, Count of Egmont and first prince of Gavere, was beheaded on the Grand-Place in Brussels

As the Egmond family rose to prominence within the Burgundian Netherlands, they spent more and more time in the south of the Netherlands, e.g. in the Egmont Palace in Brussels, the Egmont castle in Zottegem, or the castle in La Hamaide. Egmond Castle nevertheless kept its reputation: the humanist Hadrianus Junius considered it the most beautiful castle in Holland.

Lamoraal I, Count of Egmont and first prince of Gavere was the grandson of John III. He was a leading general and statesman in the Habsburg Netherlands during the 16th century. He was beheaded on the Grand-Place in Brussels on 5 June 1568 and came to be seen as one of the first leaders of the revolt against Spanish rule in the Netherlands.

During the Eighty Years' War the rebel leader Diederik Sonoy expected the Spanish army to advance from Haarlem towards Alkmaar. During the Siege of Haarlem the Spaniards had used the castle Huis ter Kleef as a base, and Sonoy wanted to prevent Egmond Castle from serving the same purpose. In the spring of 1573 Geuzen troops were stationed at Egmond. When they withdrew on 7 June 1573, they set the castle on fire, causing severe damage. On the same day they also burned the village church and the chapel of Saint Adalbert in the dunes. The castle was not razed: after the fire parts of it remained habitable.

The fate of nearby Egmond Abbey is less clear. It has long been held that Sonoy's troops burned the abbey as well, but more recent research argues that the abbey was being demolished, probably with the consent of the Prince of Orange, to supply building material for the new walls of Alkmaar ahead of the expected siege. Its remains were probably set on fire by Spanish troops on 18 July 1573, when they withdrew after a repelled attack on Alkmaar. Correspondence also places Sonoy himself at the Diemerdijk on 7 June.

=== Egmond Castle in Ruins (17th, 18th and 19th century) ===
Lamoraal II (1565–1617), son of Lamoraal I, was the last member of the main line of the Egmond family to own the castle. Weighed down by the debts that followed his father's execution and the partial confiscation of the family property, he sold many of his possessions, including the county of Egmond and the lordship of Purmerend, to the States of Holland and West Friesland in 1607. Under the States the ruins fell further into decay. Even so, well into the 17th century they still gave a fairly clear picture of the castle as it had been in the days of Lamoraal I. In 1643, seventy years after the fire, a draughtsman made sketches of the remains.

In the 1630s, the Alkmaar painter Claes Jacobsz van der Heck (c. 1575/81–1652) painted the castle not as the ruin it had become, but as it had been before its destruction. He specialised in views of Egmond Abbey, usually paired with a view of Egmond Castle, in which the town of Alkmaar with its Sint-Laurenskerk can be seen in the distance. Since both buildings were already in ruins in his lifetime, he must have relied on earlier images. For the castle he probably used the painting by Gillis de Saen now in the town hall of Zottegem, which in the early 17th century belonged to a church in Alkmaar. Several versions of these pendants exist, among them a pair in the Rijksmuseum. Their varying quality suggests that his workshop was involved in producing them.

Later artists turned to the ruins themselves. Just like the Ruins of Brederode, the ruins of Egmond Castle became a favourite subject in the 17th and 18th centuries. Painters like Meindert Hobbema and Jacob van Ruisdael and draughtsmen like Roelant Roghman and Cornelis Pronk depicted them in romantic settings. These works are now held in collections around the world, including the Rijksmuseum in Amsterdam and the Art Institute of Chicago.

In 1722, the States sold the castle for 11,000 guilders to Gerard van Egmond van de Nijenburg, a director of the Dutch East India Company and alderman of Alkmaar, from a younger branch of the Egmond family. After his death the ruins passed successively to Jan Adriaan and Catharina Christina van Egmond van de Nijenburg. In 1742 Jan Aegidius van Egmond van de Nijenburg inherited the ruins, and in 1744, he had two dilapidated towers rebuilt, the last revival of the castle.

The property later passed to the Van Foreest family and then to the Tinne family. In 1798, the ruins were sold for demolition, with the exception of the steward's tower (rentmeestertoren), which housed the village clock. In 1832 large parts of this tower were pulled down so that its bricks could be sold, and six years later the whole castle had been demolished, apart from the fragment that still stands today. The demolition did not go unnoticed. In 1856 a contributor to the periodical Dietsche Warande protested that, after a storm had brought down the middle of the last surviving arch, the villagers decided to break away the remaining stones as well, and contrasted this with the way Belgium honoured the memory of Lamoraal.

The loss of the castle ruins started discussions in the Netherlands around heritage awareness and how to treat monuments. As a result, Brederode castle, the other great ruin in Holland, became one of the first national monuments of the Netherlands.

The entrance to the castle by Gerrit Berckheyde

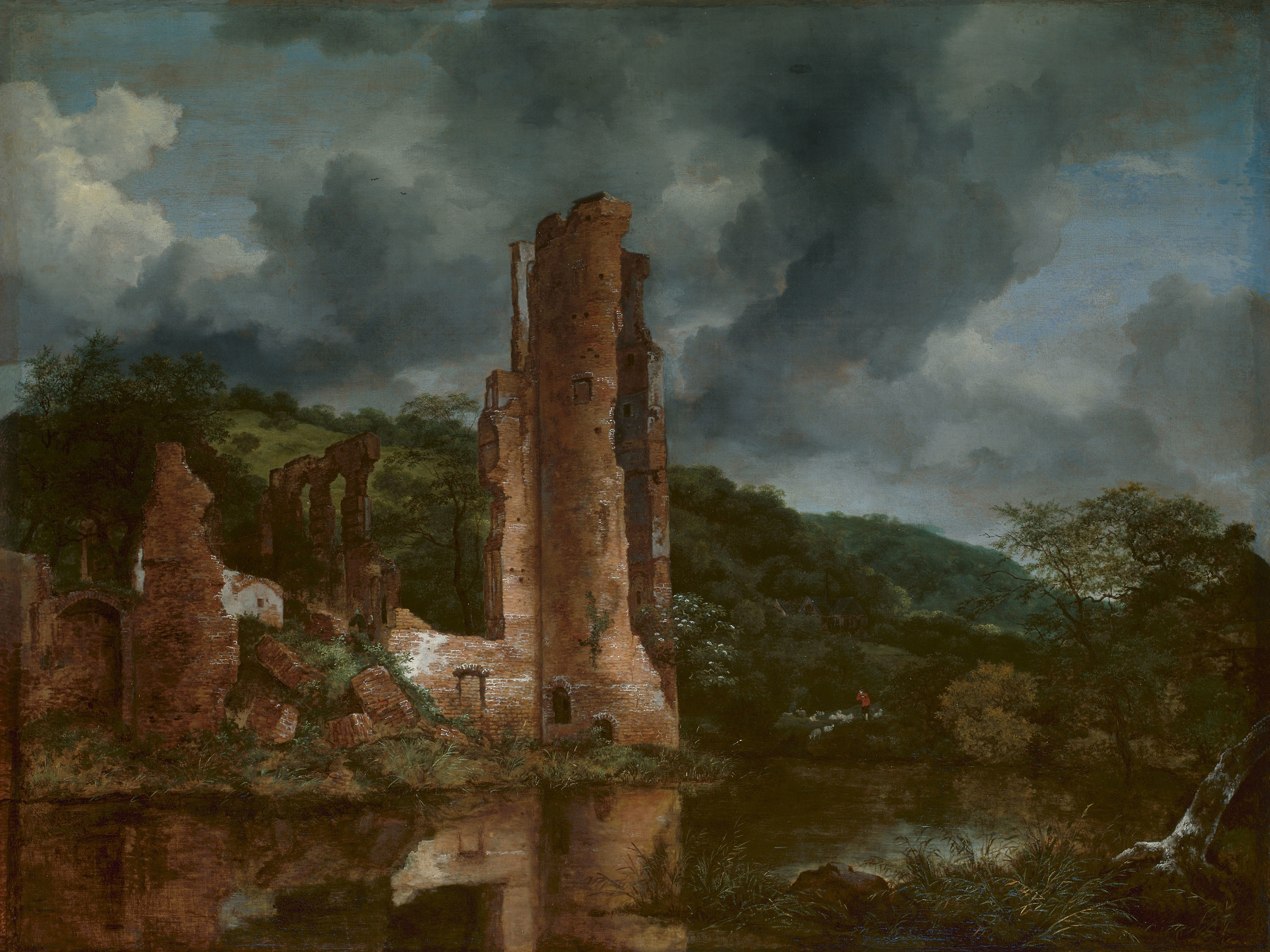
Landscape with the Ruins of the Castle of Egmond by Jacob van Ruisdael, at view in Art Institute of Chicago

View of the ruins in the second half of the 17th century

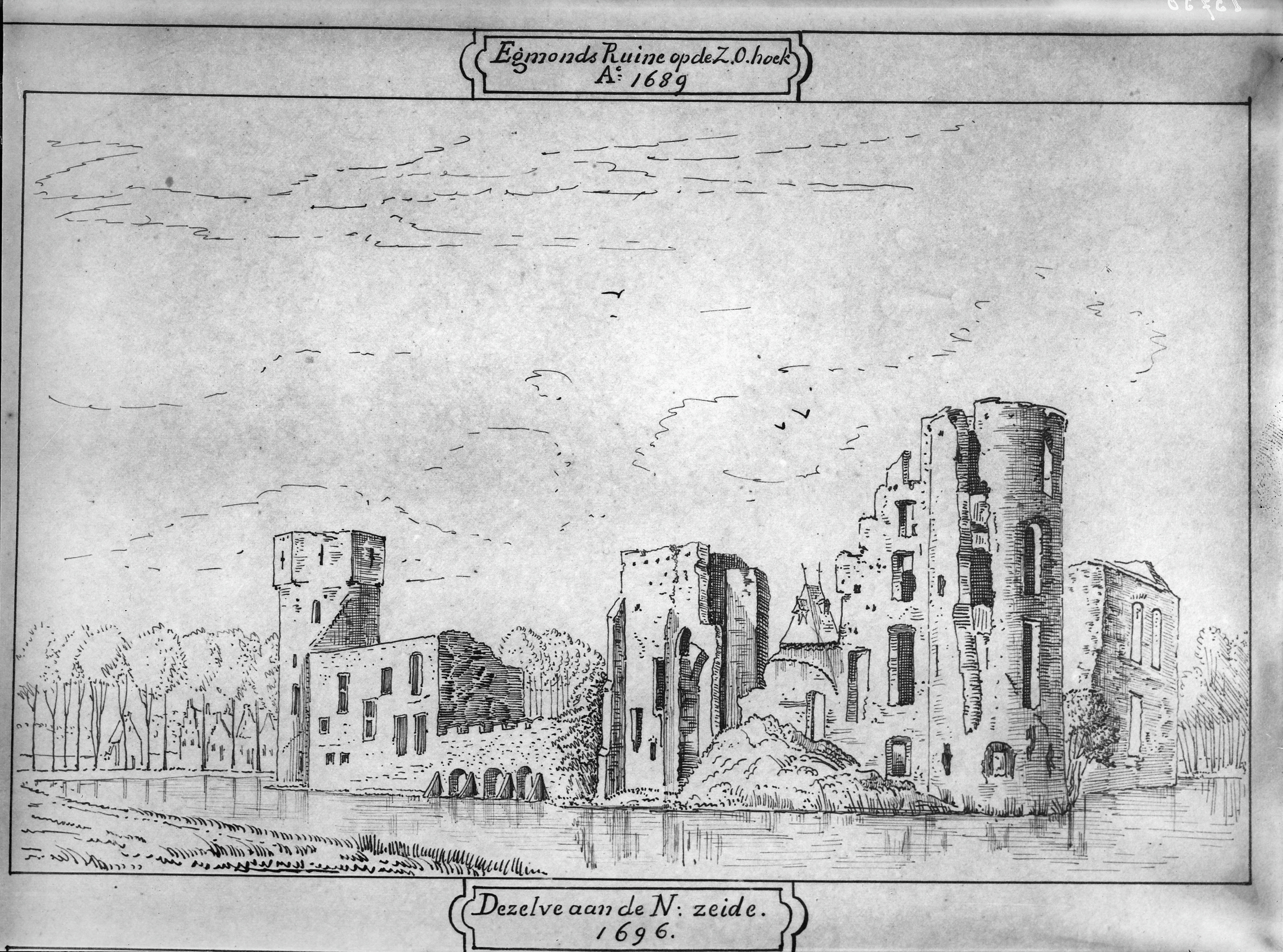
The ruins of Egmond in 1689

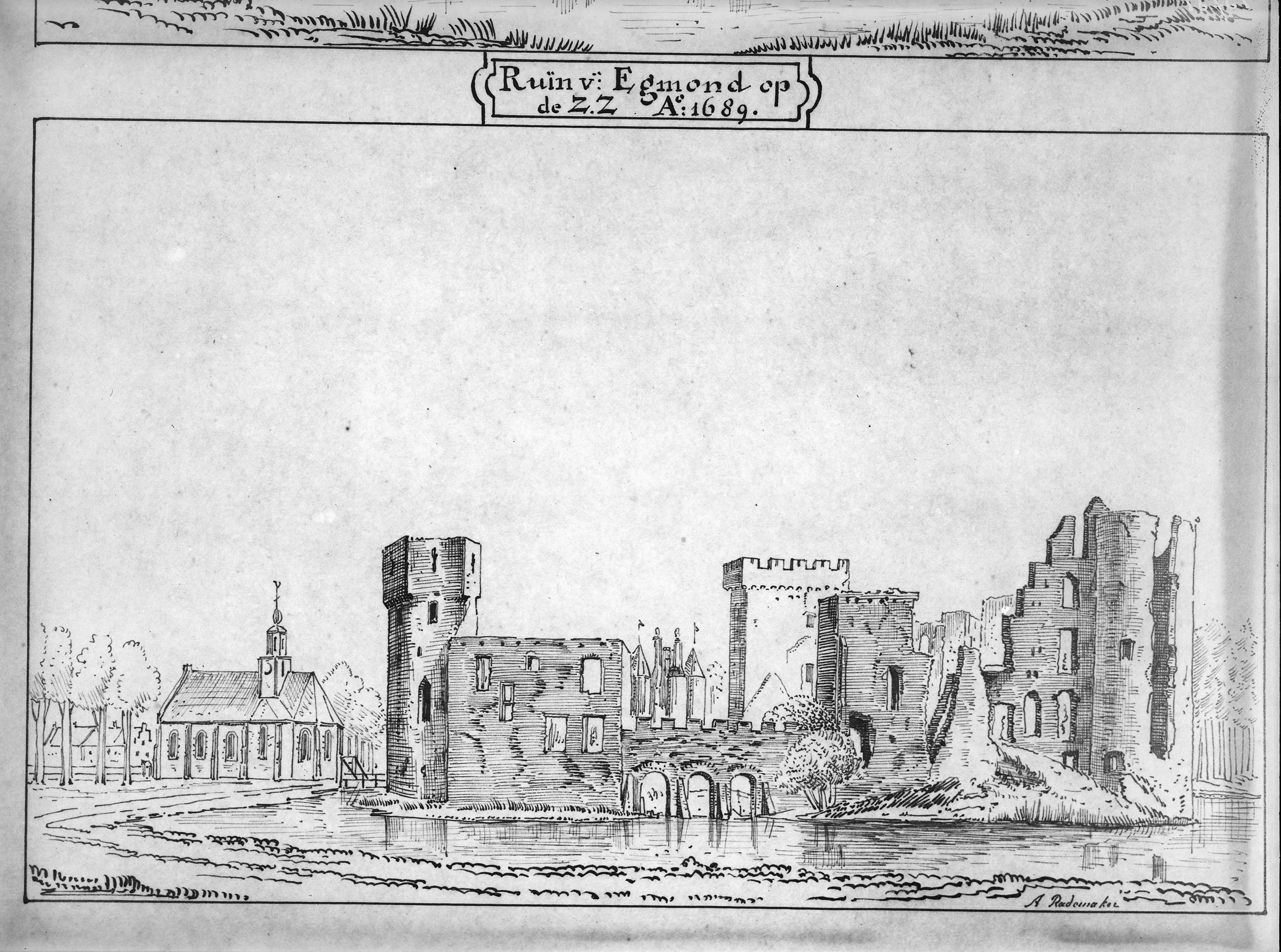
The ruins of Egmond in 1689

View from the north-west by Jacobus Schijnvoet (18th century)

The ruins from the south east (first half 18th century)

The ruins from the south (mid 18th century)

The ruins in 1780

=== Excavating Egmond Castle (1930s) ===
Plan of Egmond Castle basis the 1930s excavations

In 1933, the province of North Holland bought the castle site, by then little more than a swamp, on behalf of the provincial water company PWN. The aim was to dig out the moats again as a work relief project for the unemployed, which ran from 1934 to 1936. The work was carried out with great care for the time. Archaeologist Wouter Braat of the Rijksmuseum van Oudheden measured and documented several areas inside the foundations, where he mainly found traces of habitation from around the beginning of the common era. Castle archaeologist Jaap Renaud studied and interpreted the foundations. He published his findings in 1938.

The excavation uncovered the foundations of the irregular circular second castle, as well as the square main castle and the elongated outer bailey of the third castle. Not only the exterior walls but also some of the interior walls were found.

After the work was completed, the directors of PWN had the foundations consolidated. The recovered foundations were raised to about 30–40 cm above the old ground level. The medieval masonry, in places still resting on hard oak timber, was left intact. On top of it a concrete core was built, faced with the original recovered bricks and supplemented with new hand-moulded bricks. The finds dredged up from the moat are kept in the provincial archaeological depot of North Holland, Huis van Hilde. These consolidated foundations, together with a small fragment of the steward's tower (rentmeestertoren) in the outer bailey, form the ruins that can be seen today.

The Egmond Castle ruins seen from the air

The excavations of the main castle (seen from the south east)

The wall in the outer bailey

The remaining wall of the steward's tower

The canal between the main castle and the outer bailey

View of the southern part of the ruins during the excavation

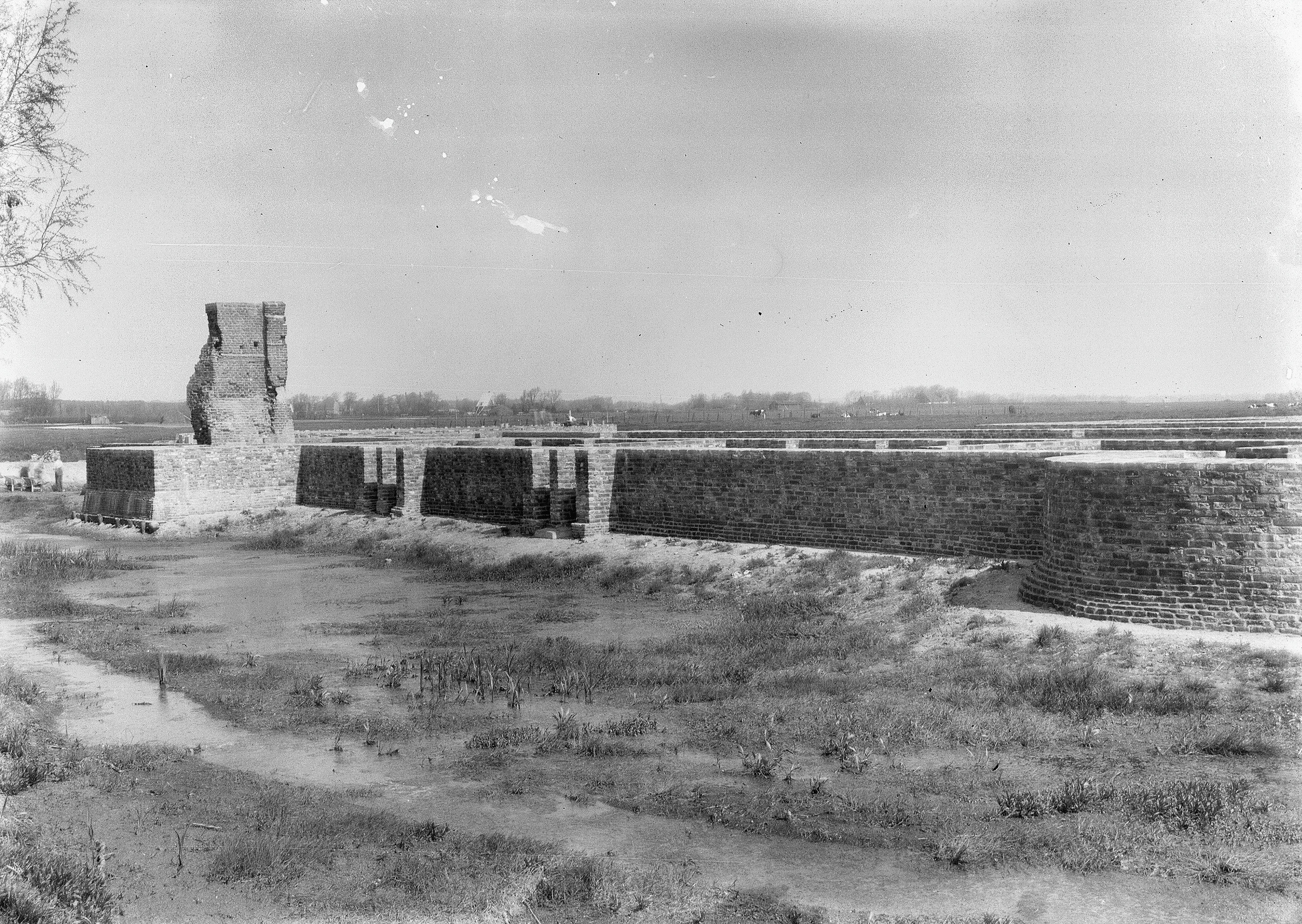
After the excavations, the walls were bricked up. View to the outer bailey from the south west

=== Modern times ===
Today the ruins are freely accessible to the public via a bridge across the moat. The foundations, excavated and bricked up in the 1930s, had received no maintenance since; the quay walls were crumbling and the asphalt top layer on the walkable parts had broken up. After the local foundation Stichting Historisch Egmond had campaigned for repairs since 2007, the municipality funded a restoration, which was carried out in 2015. The site has been registered as a Rijksmonument since 2 July 1968. Opposite the ruins, the visitor centre Huys Egmont presents the history of the castle and the Egmond family.

On 11 October 1997 a bronze statue of Lamoraal I, Count of Egmont was unveiled in the castle moat by Josep Pons, the Spanish ambassador to the Netherlands. It is a copy, cast by the De Groeve foundry, of the Statue of Egmont by Jan-Robert Calloigne on the market square of Zottegem in Flanders, the town where Lamoraal and his wife Sabina of Bavaria are buried. The text on the plinth reads: Lamoraal Graaf van Egmont 1522-1568, bedijker van de Egmondermeer 1565.

In 2024 the municipality of Bergen, heritage developer BOEi and local partners drew up a masterplan for the redevelopment of the Slotkwartier, the historic village centre around the castle site, with financial support from the national Erfgoed Deal programme. The Bergen municipal council approved the masterplan in May 2025. Part of the plan is to make the castle foundations more accessible and to develop them further, partly so that cultural events can be held on them. In November 2025 the council reserved a budget for this. The masterplan also proposes placing steel frames on the foundations to give visitors an impression of the original size of the castle. BOEi was appointed as project leader for the execution of the masterplan.

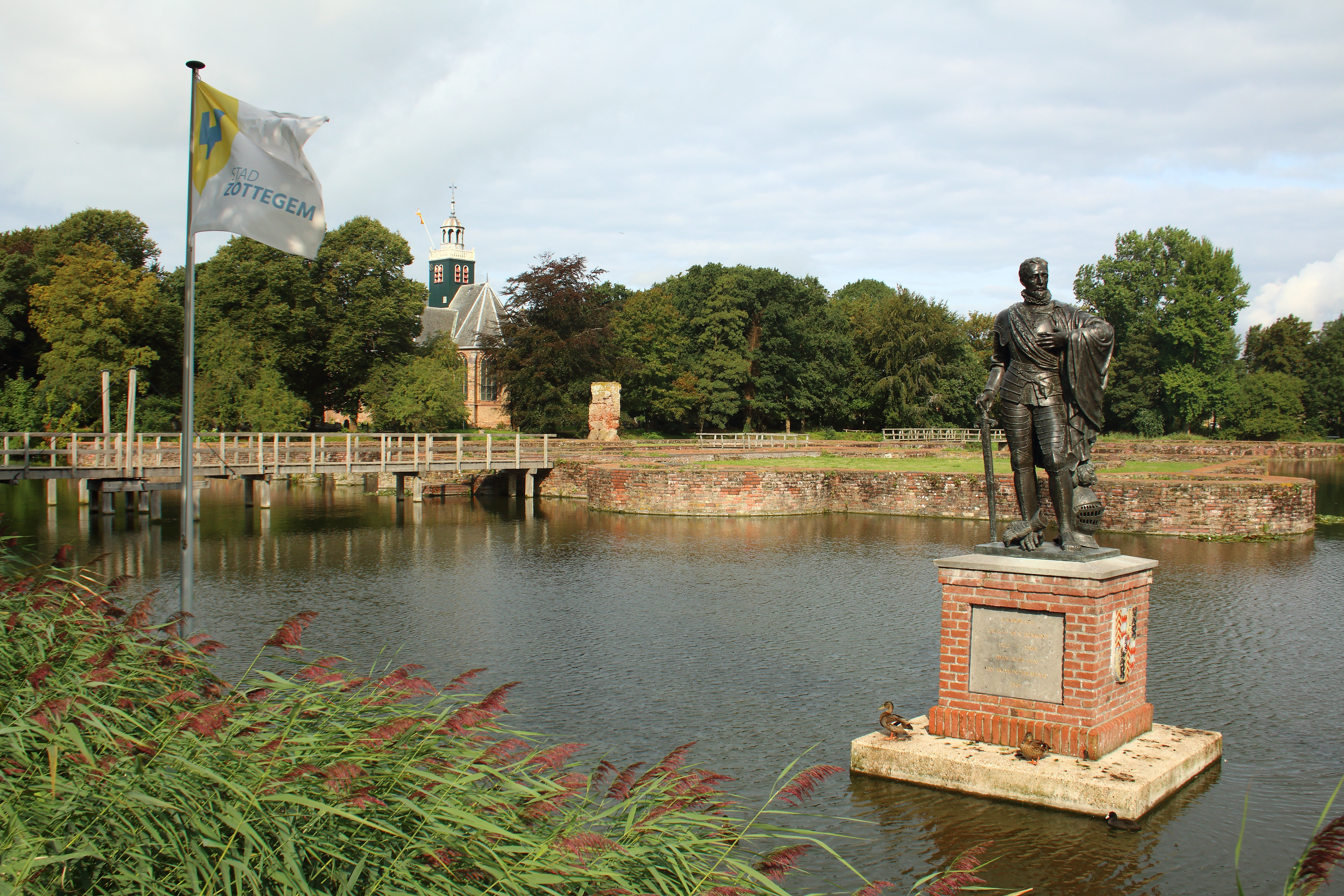
Egmond Castle today with a statue of Lamoral, count of Egmont

The statue in more detail

The ruins with the castle chapel in the back

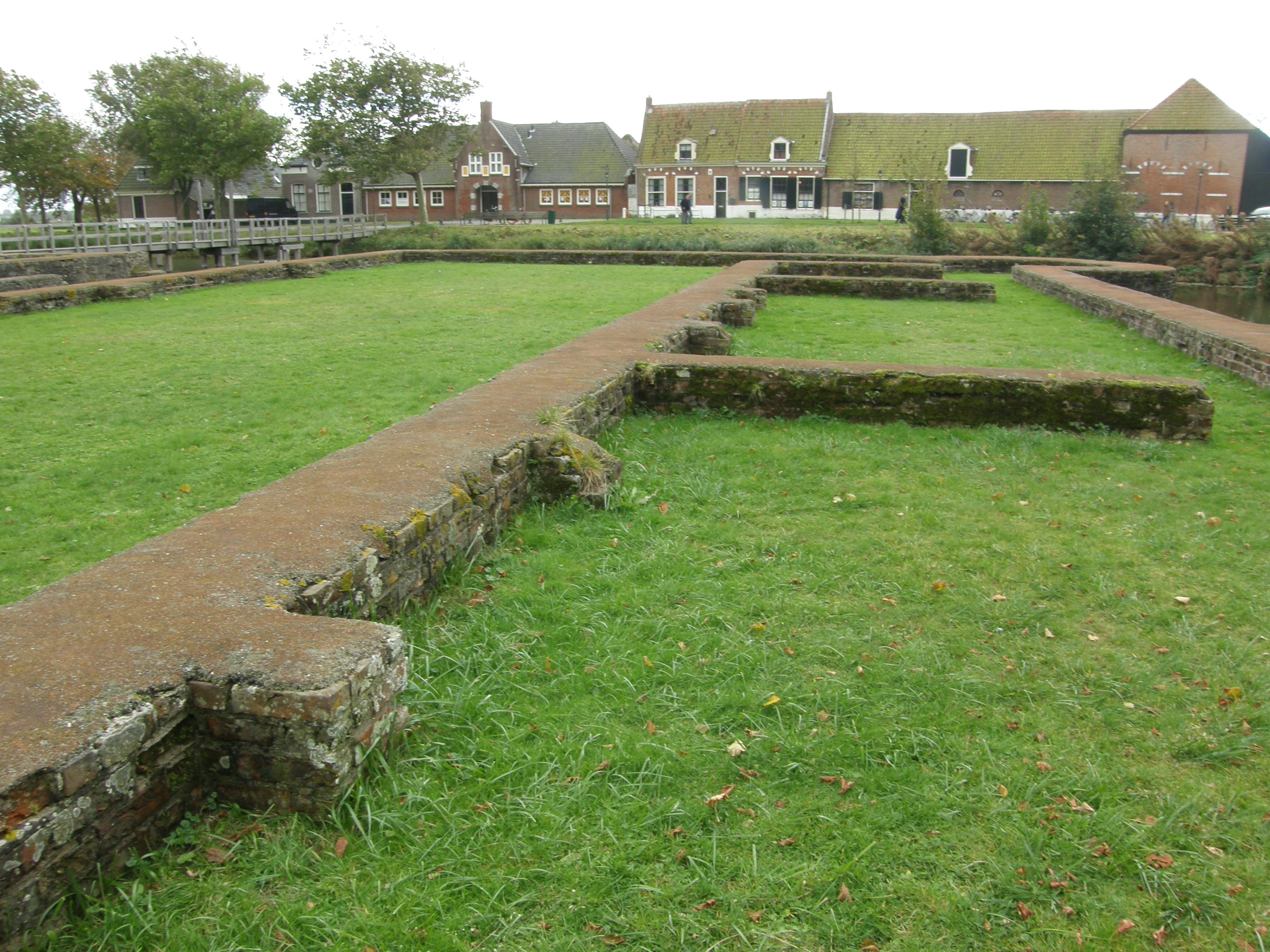
The buildings opposite the castle house a visitor centre on the history of Egmont

The remaining standing wall of the steward's tower (rentmeestertoren)

View of the baily

View of the foundations of the main castle

The foundations of the second castle

== Bibliography ==
- van Lennep, J.; Hofdijk, W.J. (1883). Merkwaardige kastelen in Nederland (in Dutch). Vol. I. Leiden.
- Vis, D. (1938). De fundamenten van het kasteel te Egmond aan den Hoef (in Dutch).
- Renaud, Jaap (1939). "Hoe heeft het slot te Egmond er uit gezien". Elsevier's Geïllustreerd Maandschrift (in Dutch). Vol. 98, no. 49.
- Beekman, A. (1961). Het slot op den Hoef (in Dutch).
- van Reyen, Paul E. (1979). Middeleeuwse kastelen in Nederland (in Dutch). Haarlem: Fibula-Van Dishoeck.
- Groesbeek, J.W. (1981). Middeleeuwse kastelen van Noord-Holland: hun bewoners en bewogen geschiedenis (in Dutch). Rijswijk: Nederlandse Kastelen Stichting.
- Burger, Arnold C.M. (1988). Het kasteel van Egmond: een schets van de ontwikkeling van het 'Slot op den Hoef' (in Dutch). Schoorl: Pirola. ISBN 90-6455-072-7.
- Janssen, Hans Louis; Kylstra-Wielinga, Annemieke; Olde Meierink, Ben, eds. (1996). 1000 jaar kastelen in Nederland: functie en vorm door de eeuwen heen (in Dutch). Utrecht: Stichting Matrijs. ISBN 90-5345-083-1.
- Cordfunke, E.H.P. (2013). Macht en aanzien: Kennemer adel in de volle middeleeuwen (1050–1350) (in Dutch). Zutphen: Walburg Pers. ISBN 978-90-5730-851-2.

== See also ==
Other palaces and castle of the Egmond family:

- Egmont Palace in Brussels
- Egmont Castle in Zottegem
- Château de Lahamaide
- Château de Braine
