= William II, Lord of Egmond =

Willem II, Lord of Egmond
- Born: c. 1230
- Died: 30 March 1304
- Noble family: House of Egmond
- Spouse: Ada (van Brederode?)
- Father: Gerard, Lord of Egmond
- Mother: Beatrix of Haarlem? or Mabilia?

William II, Lord of Egmond or Willem II, heer van Egmond (c. 1230 – 30 March 1304) was a ruling Lord of Egmond.

== Life ==
He was the son of Gerard, Lord of Egmond and an unknown mother, possibly Beatrix, daughter of Wouter of Haarlem, or Mabilia. He became Lord of Egmond after his father's death around Christmas 1242. Because he was still underaged, he was supervised by a regent, his second cousin Walter / Wouter "Stoutkind" ("naughty child") van Egmont until 1248.

In 1258, he transferred the ambachtsheerlijkheden of Spanbroek, Oudedorp, Oudkarspel and Wadeweij to Count Floris V of Holland. In return he was enfeoffed with the heerlijkheid of Warmhuizen. He purchased some territory to the North of Egmond, near Huisduinen and Bergen and started to develop this area in the following years.

Willem participated in a campaign against Friesland in 1282 and was rewarded with tithes from the heerlijkheid of Hemert. John I, Count of Holland invited him over for John's wedding to Elizabeth of Rhuddlan in 1297. Later in the year William's wife died, and Gerard, his only son, died in 1300. Upon his death in 1304, he was succeeded by his grandson, William III.

Egmond coat of arms

== Marriage and issue ==
Willem was married to Ada. They had at least two children:

- Gerard (c. 1260–1300), married Elisabeth van Strijen. Among their offspring were:
  - William III, Lord of Egmond (1281 - 1312)
  - Walter II, Lord of Egmond (1283 - 1321)
- Halewina (born c. 1285), married Henry of Cuyk, burgrave of Leiden

== See also ==
- List of Lords and Counts of Egmont

William II, Lord of Egmond House of Egmond Born: c. 1230 Died: 30 March 1304
| Preceded by Gerard | Lord of Egmond; 1242–1304 | Succeeded by William III |
