= List of lords and counts of Egmont =

This is a list of lords and counts of Egmont (Egmond aan den Hoef) of the House of Egmont.

== Lords of Egmont ==
- Radbold I (?-791)
- Gerbrand (?-845)
- Wolbrand (?-869)
- Radbold II (?-920)
- Dodo I (?–977)
- Walger (?–1036)
- Dodo II (?–1074)
- Beerwout or Berwoud I (?–1114)
- Beerwout or Berwoud II (c. 1095–1158)
- Albrecht/Albert (c. 1130–1168)
- Dodo III (c. 1130–1200)
- Wouter / Walter I (1158–1208)
- Willem / William I (c. 1180–1234)
- Gerard / Gerald I (c. 1200–1242)
- Willem / William II (c. 1235–1304)
- Willem / William III (1281–1312)
- Wouter / Walter II (1283–1321)
- Jan / John I (1310–1369)
- Arent / Arnoud / Arnold (1337–1409)
- Jan / John II (1384–1451)
- Willem / William IV (1412–1483)

== Counts of Egmont ==
- Jan / John III (or I) (1438–1516)
- Jan / John IV (or II) (1499–1528)
- Karel/Charles I (?–1541) )
- Lamoraal / Lamoral I (1522–1568), whose execution contributed to the outbreak of the Eighty Years' War
- Filips/Philip (1559–1590)
- Lamoral II (????–1617)
- Charles II (1567–1620)
- Louis (1600–1654)
- Louis Philip (1630–1682)
- Louis Ernest (1665-1693)
- Procop Francis (1664-1707)
- Procopo Pignatelli (1703-1743), from the House of Pignatelli, married to Maria Clara of Egmont
- Guido Felix Pignatelli (1720 - 1753)
- Casimir Pignatelli (1727-1801)

== Genealogy ==
Genealogy of the House of Egmont

House of Egmont

HOUSE OF EGMONT
Ratbold I van Egmont ( - 791) heer van Egmond, - 791
Gerbrand van Egmont ( - 845) heer van Egmond, 791 - 845
Wolbrand van Egmont ( - 869) heer van Egmond, 845 - 869
Radbold II van Egmont ( - 920) heer van Egmond, 869 - 920
Dodo I van Egmont (~ca. 940 - 977) heer van Egmond, 920 - 977
Walger van Egmont (~976 - 1036) nl:Lijst van heren en graven van Egmond, 977 - 1036
Dodo II van Egmont (~1010 - 1074) heer van Egmond, 1036 - 1074
Beerwout I van Egmont (? - 1114) heer van Egmond, 1074 - 1114
Beerwout II van Egmont (1094 - 1158) heer van Egmond, ~ 1114 - 1158
Allard van Egmont (1130 - 1168) heer van Egmond, 1158	Dodo van Egmont (1131 - 1200)
Wouter or Beerwout III van Egmont; Kwade Wouter (ca. 1145 - 1208) heer van Egmond	Allard van Egmont (1150 - 12??), heer van Buren.
Willem I van Egmont (ca.1180 - 1234)) heer van Egmond, 1208	Gerard van Egmont (d 1217)
Gerard van Egmont (ca. 1200 - 1242) heer van Egmond, 1234	Wouter van Egmont d. 1223 heer van Meerestein
Willem II van Egmont (1235? - 1304) heer van Egmond, 1242	Wouter “Stoutkind” van Egmont (d. 1272) heer van Meeresteinguardian of Willem II van Egmont; m. Beatrix van Haarlem
Gerhard von Egmond (*ca 1260 - 1300) m.1280 Elisabeth van Strijen (*ca 1262 +1297)	Floris Wouterszoon; Recorded as castellan of Medemblik in 1296 and bailiff in 1298.
Willem III van Egmond (ca. 1281 +1312) heer van Egmond, 1304 m.Margareta von Blankenheim (+1312)	Wouter II van Egmond *ca 1283, +3.9.1321 heer van Egmond, 1312 m.Beatrijs van de Doortoge (*Naaldwijk ca 1290, +11.9.1323), dau.of Dirk van der Doortege	Nikolaus, +1305	Johann, +1312	Aelbrecht Floriszoon van Egmont ( ~ 1330 -) Knighted 1345; recorded as "of Meerestein" 1350 m. 1329, Elisabeth van der Woude
Jan I van Egmond(en) (Egmond-Binnen ca 1310, +Ijsselstein 28.12.1368) heer van Egmond, Stattholder of Holland, m.1331 Guyote van Amstel Ijsselstein (*ca 1314 +ca 1377), dau.of Arend van Amstel, Heer van Ijsselstein	Gerrit, Stattholder of Holland, *ca 1320, +before 25.10.1398; m.Johanna van Raephorst	Walter, fl 1459	Jan Aelbrechtsz van Egmont van Meerestein
William (1364 – 1402, Duke of Geldre, 1377, & III of Jülich, 1393 ∞ Katherine of Bavaria	Reinald IV (c. 1365 – 1423); Duke of Geldre & duke of Jülich, 1402	Joanna of Jülich ∞ John V lord of Arkel	Arend van Egmond (ca. 1337 - 1409) heer van Egmond, Heer van IJsselstein, van Zegwaard military officer	Wilhelm, fl 1370/1410; m.Mechtild von Hemert	Gerrit, fl 1370/1404; m.ca 1380 Wilhelmina von Wateringen	Albrecht, a canon in Utrecht	Aelbrecht Jansz van Egmont heer van Meerestein (~ 1365-1461) m. Agnes van Beesde. Their children included Otto van Egmont van Meerestein, identified as the founder of the Kenenburg line.
Maria van Arkel	Jan II van Egmont (en) (c. 1385 – 1451) lord of Egmond, 1409 regent of Geldre	Willem, (ca 1387 - 1451) m.ca 1442 Anne de Henin (+1478)	Otto van Egmont van Meerestein m. Machteld van der Goye.
Katharina van Kleef (1417-1476)	Arnold van Egmont (en) (1410 – 1473); Duke of Geldre , 1423-1465, 1471-1473; HOUSE OF EGMONT	Willem IV van Egmont (en) (1412–1483); Lord of Egmont and IJsselstein, stadtholder of Guelders	Albrecht van Egmont van Meerestein c. 1426–1487 m. Haze de Blote van Lievenburgh; Through this marriage, Kenenburg came into the family's possession around 1460.
Maria van Egmont-Gelre(en) (ca. 1429/1434-1463); Queen consort of Scotland, spouse of James II	Willem van Egmont (1434-jong overleden)	Margaretha van Egmont (1436-1486)	Catharina of Bourbon (1440-1469)	Adolf van Egmond (en) (Grave, 12 februari 1438 – Doornik, 27 juni 1477); Duke of Geldre, 1465-1471, 1477	Catharina van Egmont (ca. 1440-1497), regent of Geldre, 1477 - 1492 (Was appt. by the States of Guelders as regent as long as there was no duke. Rule contested by Maximilian of Austria.)	Jan III van Egmont (en) (1438 – 1516); Lord of Egmond, 1483-1516, created Count of Egmond, 1486; Heer van Purmerland en Ilpendam, 1483; Stadhouder van Holland, Zeeland en West-Friesland, 1483-1515	Frederik van Egmont (en) (ca 1440 – 1521); Count of Buren and Leerdam, 1492; Lord of IJsselstein, 1464; Stadhouder van Gelre en Zutphen, 1507 - 1511; Stadhouder van Friesland, 1515 - 1518	Willem van Egmont (d.1494) stadhouder van Gelre
Maria ∞ John III duke of Cleves; HOUSE OF LA MARCK	Filippa van Egmont (1467 - 1547) m. Rene II, Duke of Lorraine from here the House of Lorraine desc. & claims Geldre	Karel van Gelre (en) (Grave, 9 november 1467 – Arnhem, 30 juni 1538); Duke of Geldre ,1492–1538 m. Elisabeth van Brunswijk-Lüneburg	Jan IV van Egmont (en); 1499–1528); 2nd Count of Egmont, 9th Lord of Purmerend, Purmerland and Ilpendam knight of the Golden Fleece m. Francisca van Luxemburg(en)	Philip van Egmond (1502 - 1529), heer van Baer	Jurrien van Egmond (1503), abt van St. Amant, heer van Baer. He gave the lordship of Baer to Karel, the oldest son of his brother Jan.	George or Joris van Egmont (ca. 1504 - 1559) bishop of Utrecht, 1534	Floris van Egmont (en) (1470–1539); Count of Buren and Leerdam (en), 1521; Stadtholder of Guelders, 1507-1511 & and Friesland, 1515-18 knight of the Golden Fleece
Margaretha (1517 – Bar-le-Duc 10 march 1554), gehuwd met Nicolaas van Lotharingen (1524 – 1577)	Karel († Cartagena 7 december 1541); 3rd Count of Egmont, 10th Lord of Purmerend, Purmerland and Ilpendam, 1528 lord of Baer	Lamoraal (en) (1522 – executed 1568); 4th Count of Egmont, 11th Lord of Purmerend, Purmerland and Ilpendam, lord of Baer, 1541; Prince of Gavere, 1553; Captain General of the Lowlands under Charles V knight of the Golden Fleece,1546, Imperial Chamberlain. defeated the French in the battles of Saint-Quentin (1557) and Gravelines (1558). Stadholder of Flanders and Artois, 1559	Maximiliaan van Egmont(en) (1509–1548); Count of Buren and Leerdam (en) and Lingen, 1539; Stadtholder of Friesland, 1540-48 knight of the Golden Fleece m. Françoise de Lannoy (1513-1562)
Filips van Egmont (en) (1558–1590); 5th Count of Egmont, 12th & last Lord of Purmerend, Purmerland and Ilpendam, lord of Baer, 1541; Prince of Gavere, 1568, knight of Golden Fleece,	Lamoraal II van Egmont (1565? - 1617); 6th Count of Egmont, Prince of Gavere, 1590, estates confiscated by States of Holland	Karel II van Egmont (en) (1567–1620); 7th Count of Egmont, Prince of Gavere, 1617; Knight of Golden Fleece,1599; Gov of Namur	William the Silent, Prince of Orange	Anna van Egmond (en) (1533-1558); Countess of Buren and Leerdam, 1546 (en) and Lingen, 1539
Lodewijk van Egmont (en) (1600–1654); 8th Count of Egmont, Prince of Gavere, 1620; Knight of Golden Fleece	Maurice of Nassau; Prince of Orange, 1618; Count of Buren and Leerdam, defacto, 1584, in sui juris 1618 (en)	Frederick Henry of Orange; Prince of Orange; Count of Buren and Leerdam, 1625 (en)	Filips Willem van Oranje (en) (1554 – 1618); Prince of Orange, 1584 Count of Buren and Leerdam, 1558 (en); Knight of Golden Fleece, 1599	Maria van Nassau (en) (1556–1616) m. 1595 graaf Filips van Hohenlohe (1550-1606)
Lodewijk Filips van Egmont (en) (1630–1682); 9th Count of Egmont, Prince of Gavere, 1654; Knight of Golden Fleece, 1670; Spanish Captain-General, Ambassador in London, Viceroy of Sardinia
Lodewijk Ernest van Egmont (1665 - 1693); 10th Count of Egmont, Prince of Gavere, 1682; Knight of Golden Fleece a Spanish General	Procop Frans van Egmond ( 1664 - 1707); 11th Count of Egmont, Prince of Gavere, 1654 a Spanish General m.1697 Louise de Cosnac (*1674/75 - 1717), dau.of Marquis Francois de Cosnac	Maria Clara van Egmont (1661 - 1714) m. Niccolo Pignatelli, Duca di Bisaccia (*1658 - 1719), son of Don Carlo Pignatelli, Duca di Bisaccia and Donna Chiara del Giudice, desc.	Marie Therese; m.Albert Louis Ghislain de Trazegnies, Comte de Trazegnies, Vicomte d'Arnemuiden (+1710), son of Octave Joseph de Trazegnies, Comte de Flechin, Vicomte d'Arnemuyden
