= Walter II =

Walter II may refer to:

- Walter II of Brienne
- Walter II de Clifford
- Walter II, Lord of Egmond
- Walter II Grenier
