= Egmond aan den Hoef =

- Village
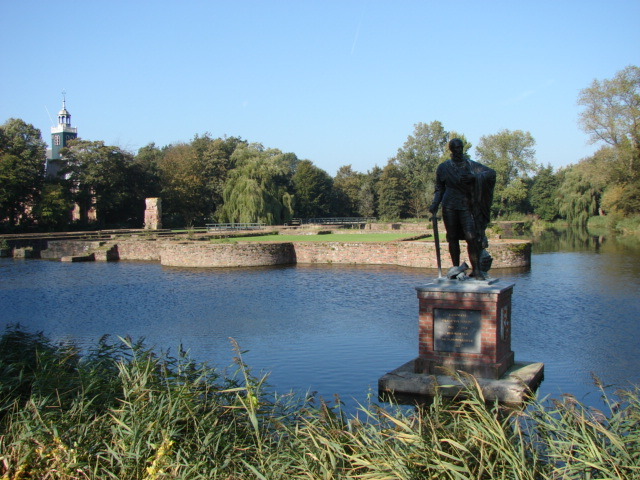
- Egmont's statue (of Lamoral, Count of Egmont) before the remains of Castle den Hoef (Castle Egmond), and in the background the 13th-century castle chapel which was fully restored in the 17th century

- Flag Coat of arms

- Location in the Netherlands Location in the province of North Holland in the Netherlands
- Coordinates: 52°37′N 4°39′E
- Country: Netherlands
- Province: North Holland
- Municipality: Bergen

Area
  - Village: 13.89 km^{2} (5.36 sq mi)
- Elevation: 3.6 m (12 ft)

Population (2025)
  - Village: 3,395
  - Density: 244.4/km^{2} (633.0/sq mi)
  - Urban: 2,295
  - Rural: 1,105
- Time zone: UTC+1 (CET)
  - Summer (DST): UTC+2 (CEST)
- Postal code: 1934
- Dialing code: 072

Egmond aan den Hoef (Dutch pronunciation: [ˈɛxmɔnt aːn də(n) ˈɦuf]) is a village in the Dutch province of North Holland. It is a part of the municipality of Bergen, and lies about 7 kilometres (4.3 mi) west of Alkmaar. Until 2001, Egmond aan den Hoef was part of the municipality of Egmond.

The village was first mentioned in 1167 Ekmunde, and means "parcel of land belonging to Egmond". The name originally applied only to the castle, but was later used for the settlement around the castle.

In Egmond aan den Hoef are the remains of Egmond Castle, the residence of the House of Egmond. The castle was first built in the 11th century, and was destroyed around 1205. It was rebuilt and fortified, and was destroyed again in the 14th century. Again it was rebuilt. In 1573 at the order of William the Silent it was demolished by the Geuzen, led by Diederik Sonoy. The remnants were taken down at the end of the 18th century. During the 1930s the remains were dug up.

The French philosopher René Descartes, author of Meditations on First Philosophy, lived in Egmond aan den Hoef, right near the castle remains, in 1643-44 and perhaps longer. For many years he lived in the neighboring village of Egmond-Binnen.

== Famous inhabitants ==
- William II, Lord of Egmond (ca.1230-1304)
- John I, Lord of Egmond] (1310 - 1369)
- Arnold I, Lord of Egmond (1337 - 1409)
- John II, Lord of Egmond] (1384 - 1451)
- William IV, Lord of Egmont (1412 - 1483)
- John III of Egmont, first Count of Egmond (1438 - 1516)
- John IV of Egmont, 2nd Count of Egmond (1499 - 1528)
- Isaac le Maire (1558-1624), founder of the Dutch East India Company
- René Descartes (1596-1650)
- Nicolaes Witsen (1641-1717), mayor of Amsterdam
- Erwin Bowien (1899-1972), German Painter.
- Teun de Nooijer (born there in 1976), hockey player

== Gallery ==
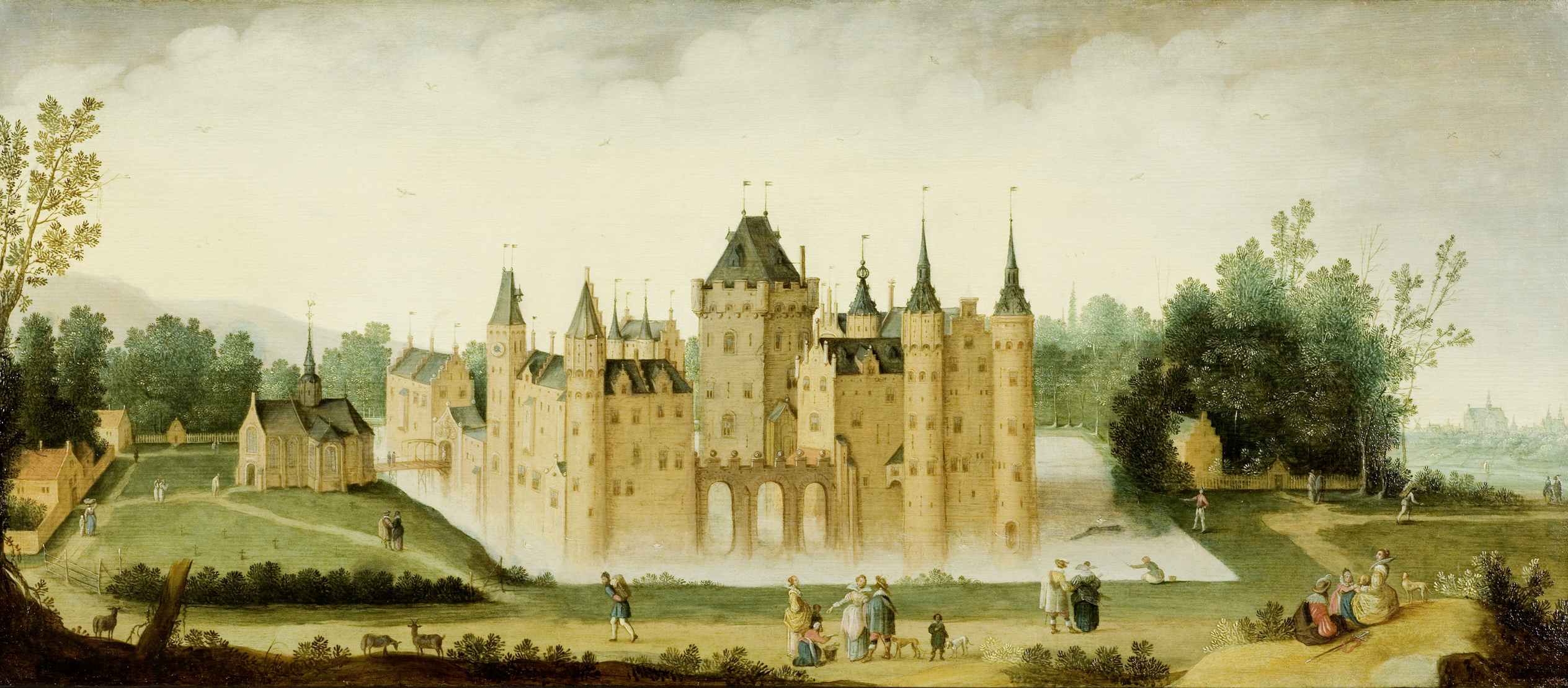
View of Egmond Castle, by Claes Jacobsz van der Heck (1638), Rijksmuseum Amsterdam

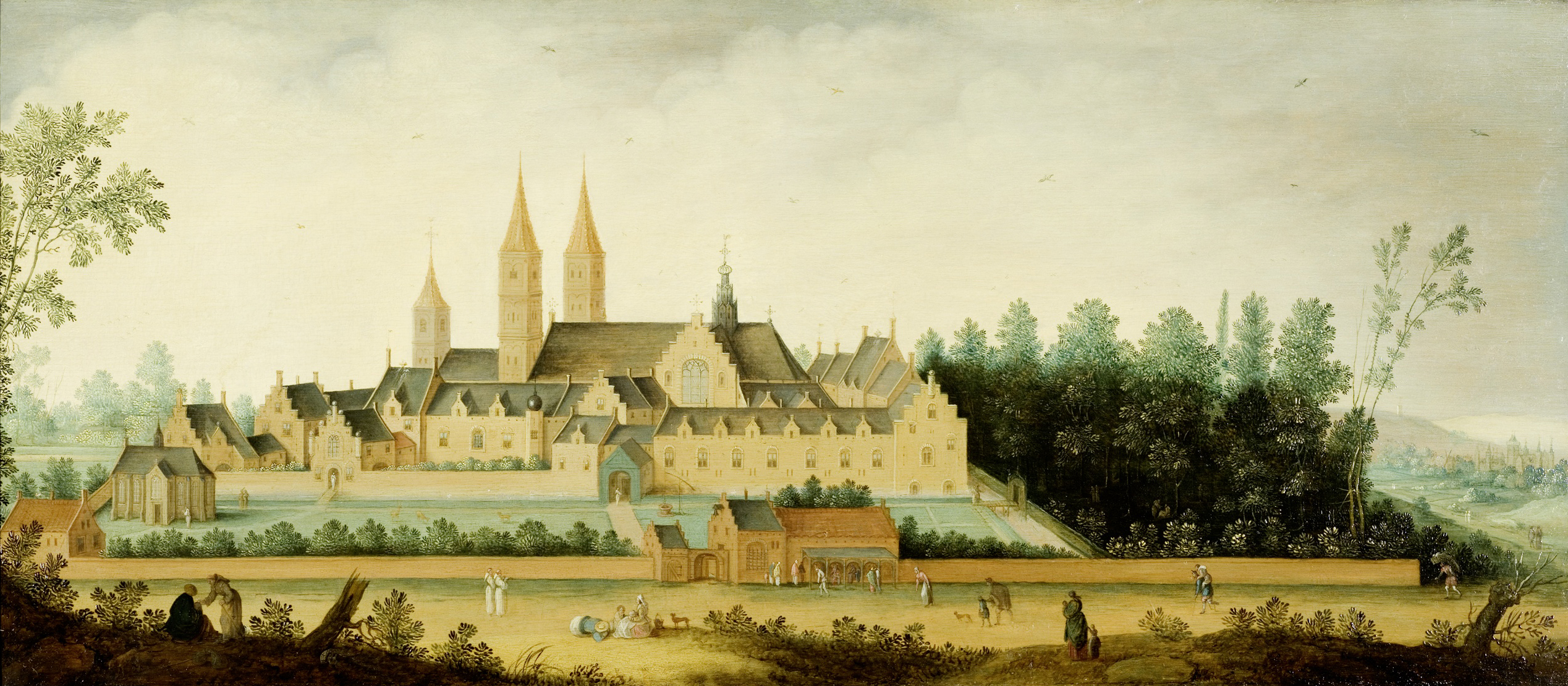
View of Egmond Abbey, by Claes Jacobsz van der Heck (1638), Rijksmuseum Amsterdam

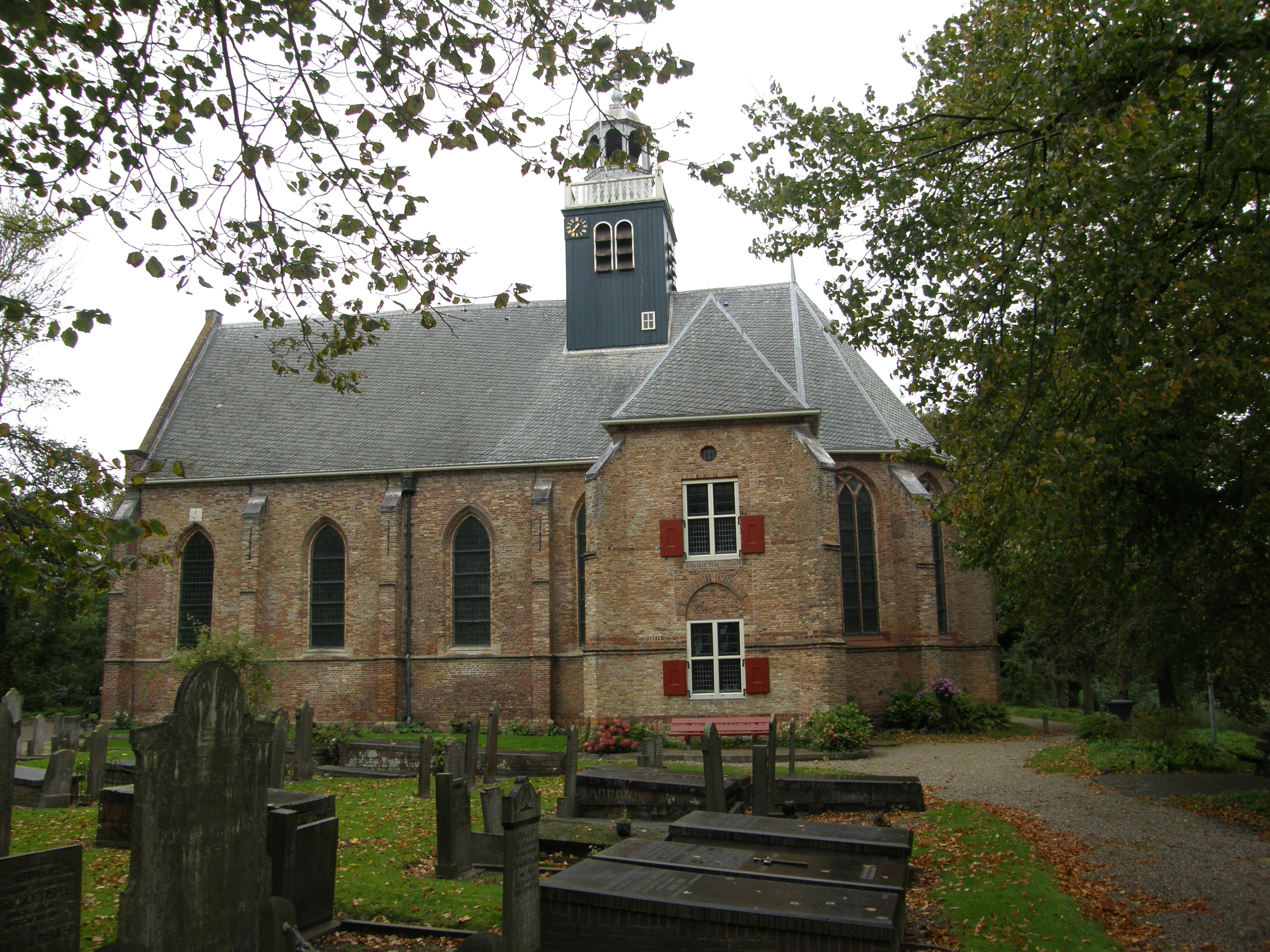
13th – 17th century chapel of Egmond Castle

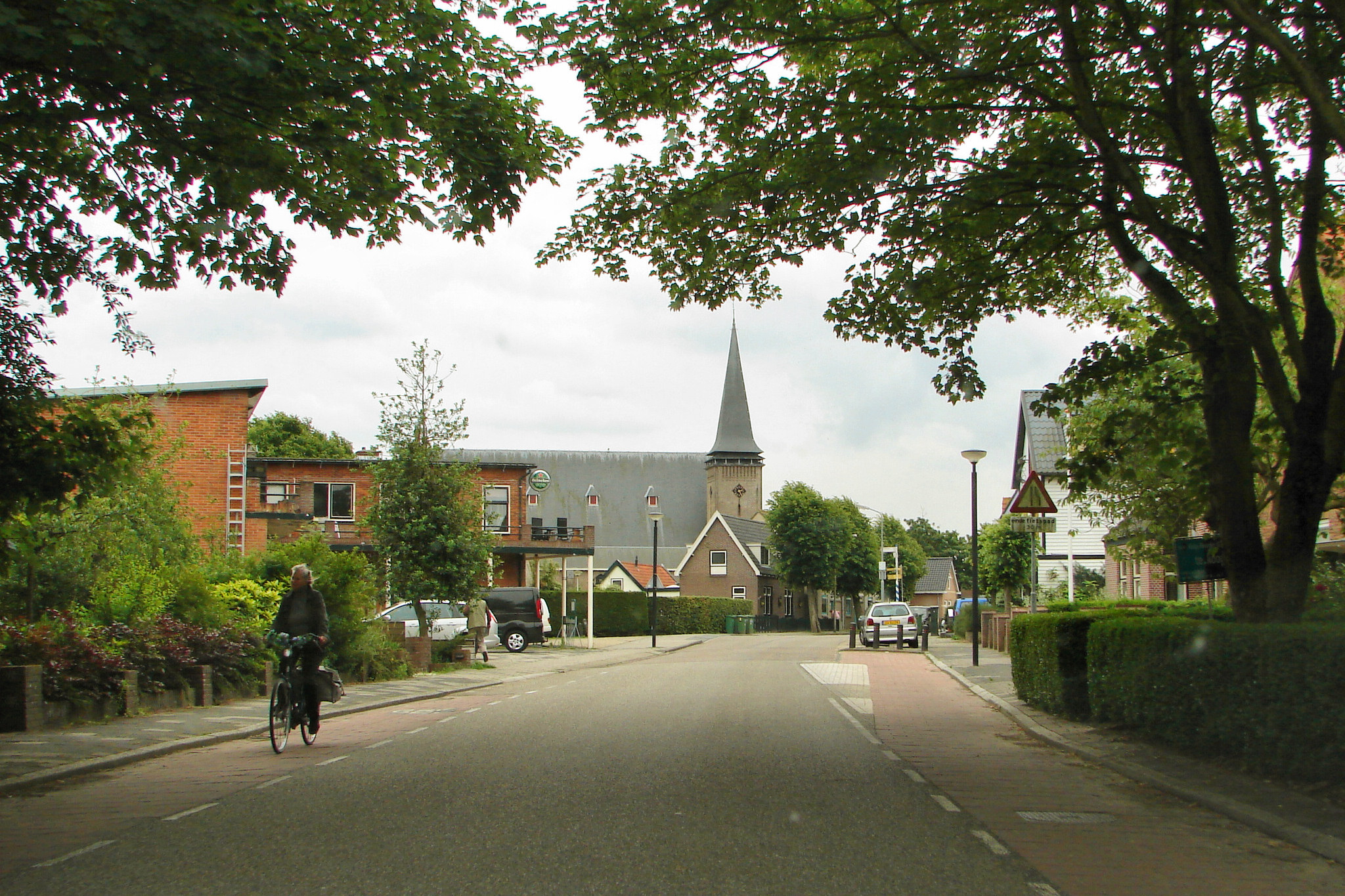
Village center of Egmond aan de Hoef

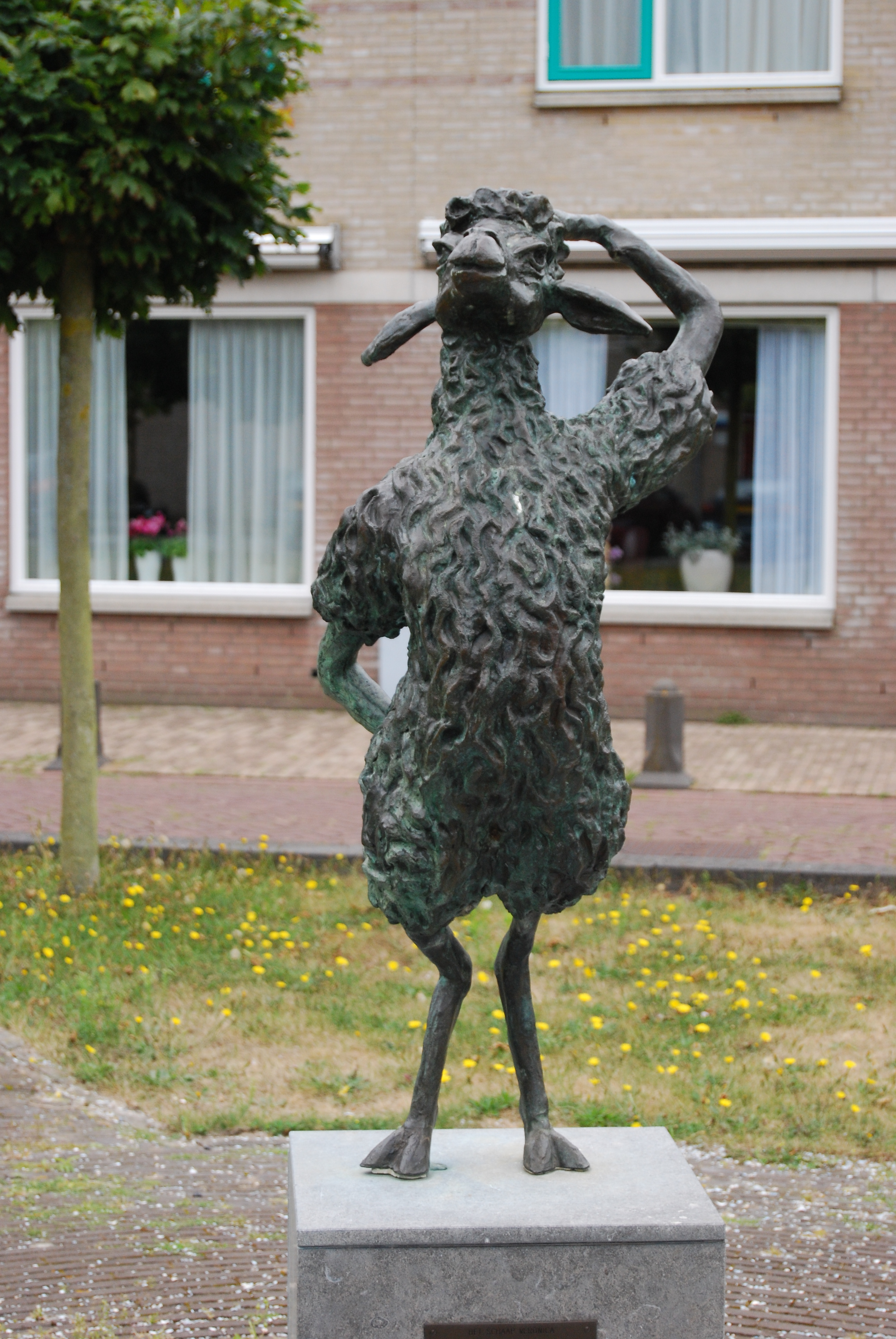
Het Schaap Veronica by Frank Rosen. Statue commemorating Wim Bijmoer, illustrator of Annie M. G. Schmidts poems about "Het Schaap Veronica".

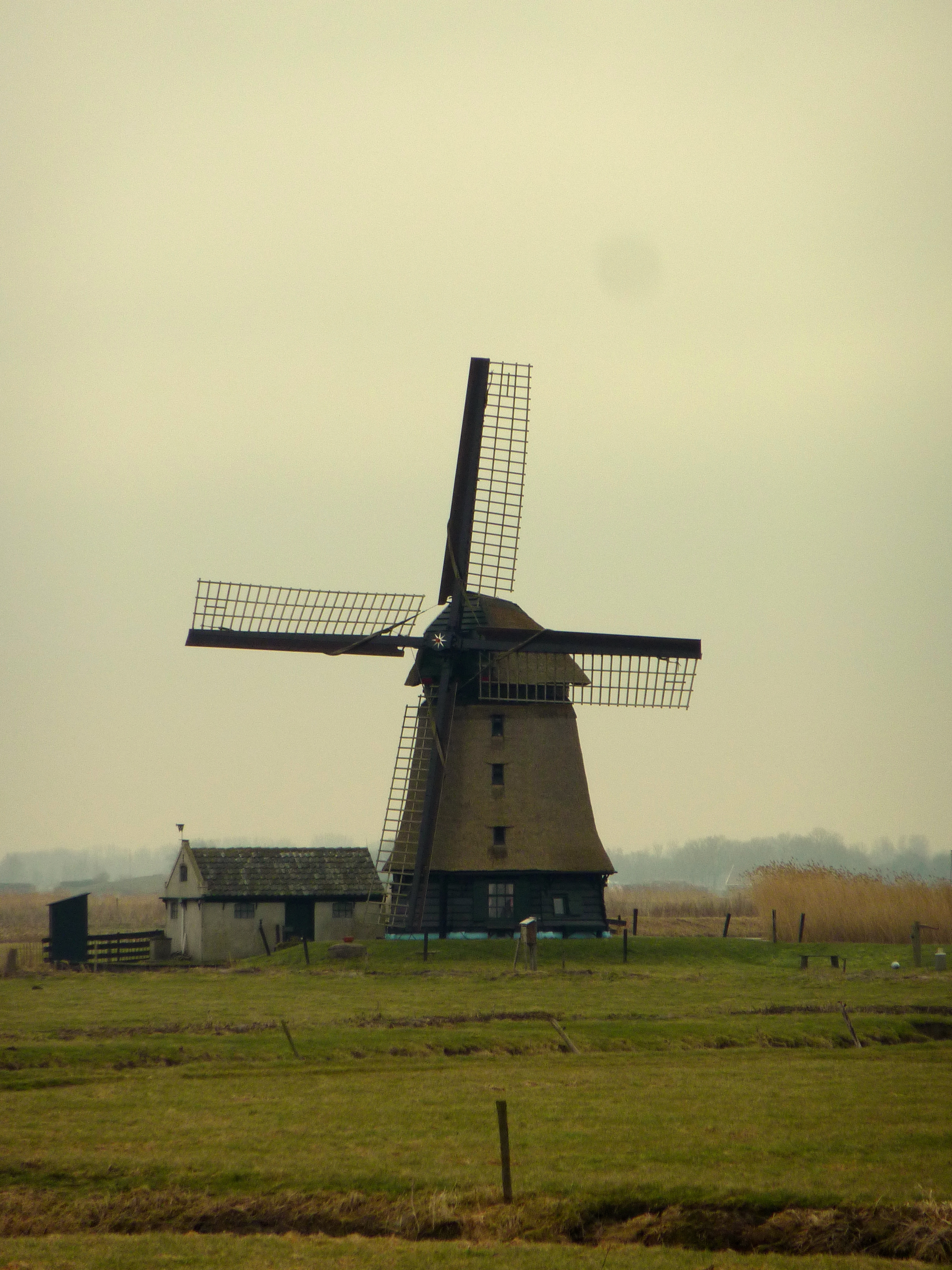
Wimmenumer windmill, built in 1774

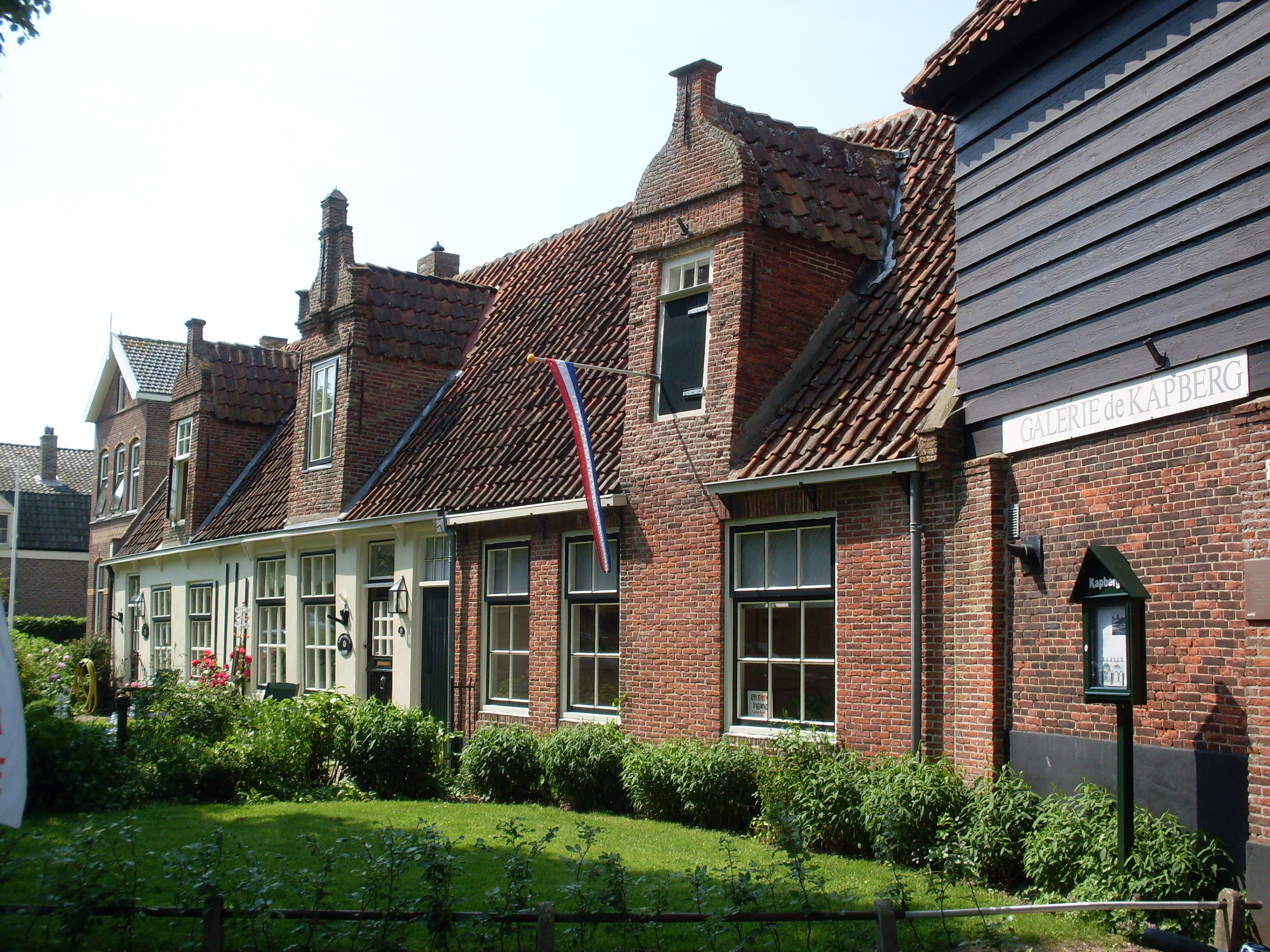
17th century houses at the castle road (Slotweg)

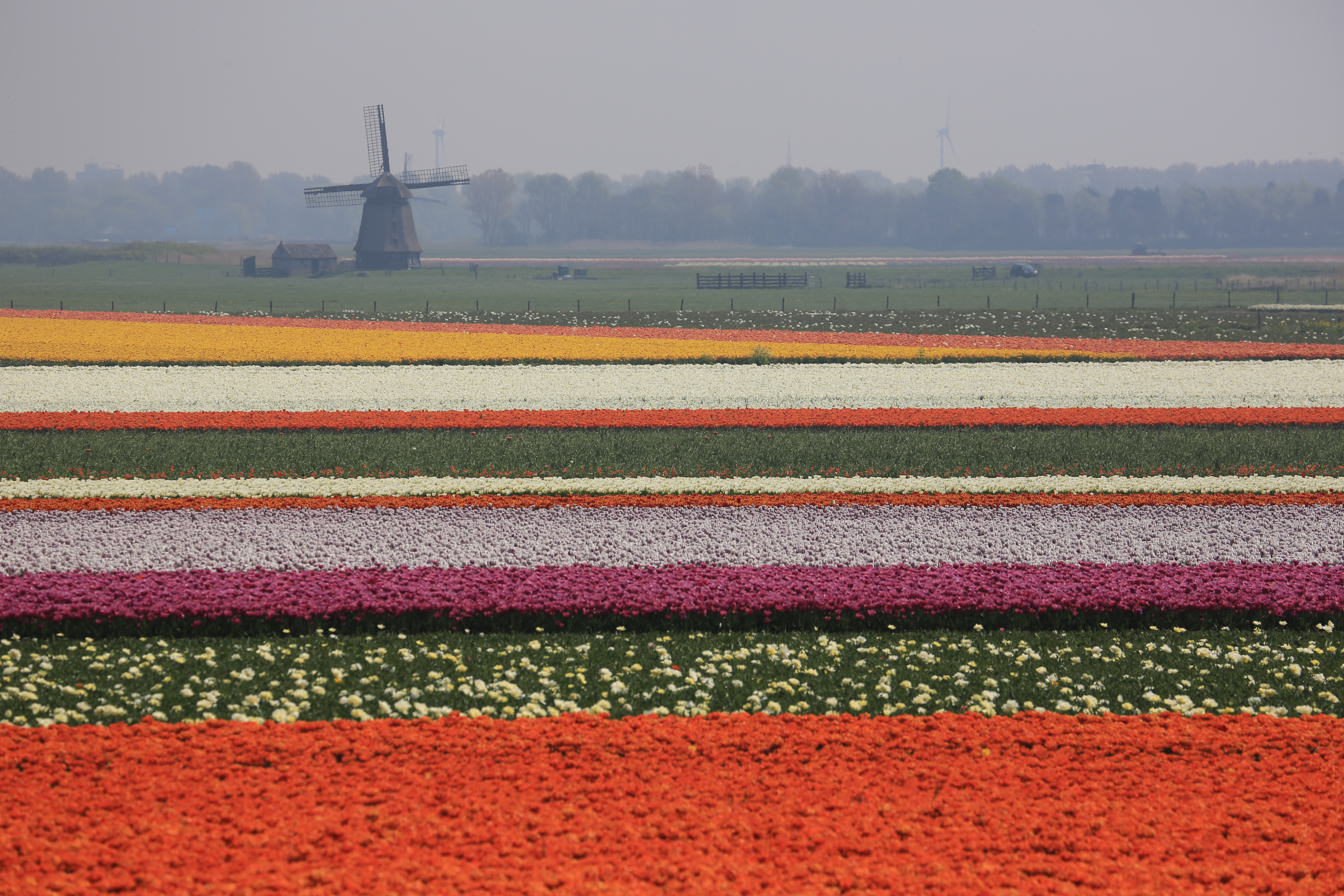
Bulb fields near Egmond aan den Hoef

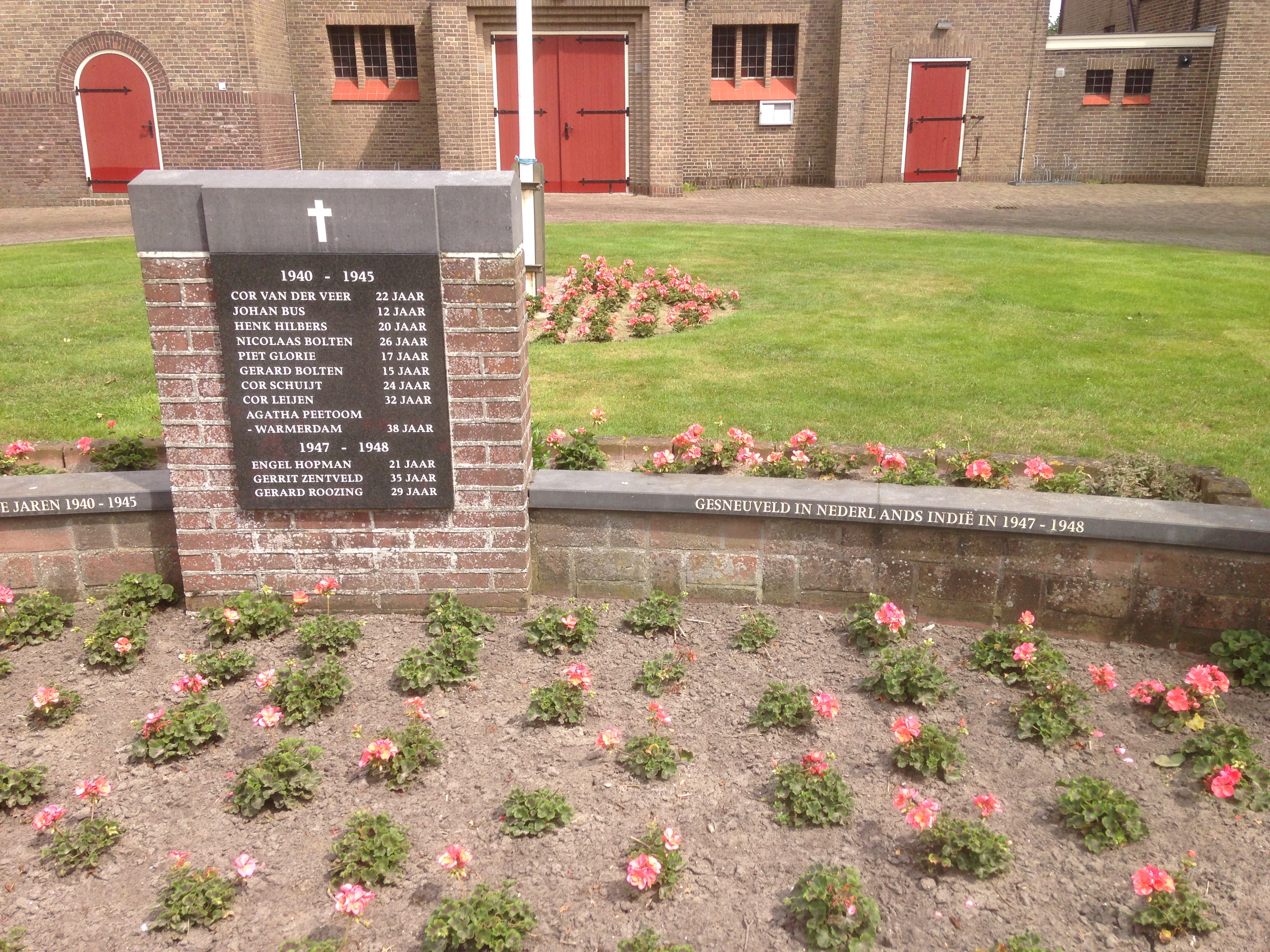
Memorial to local victims of World War II

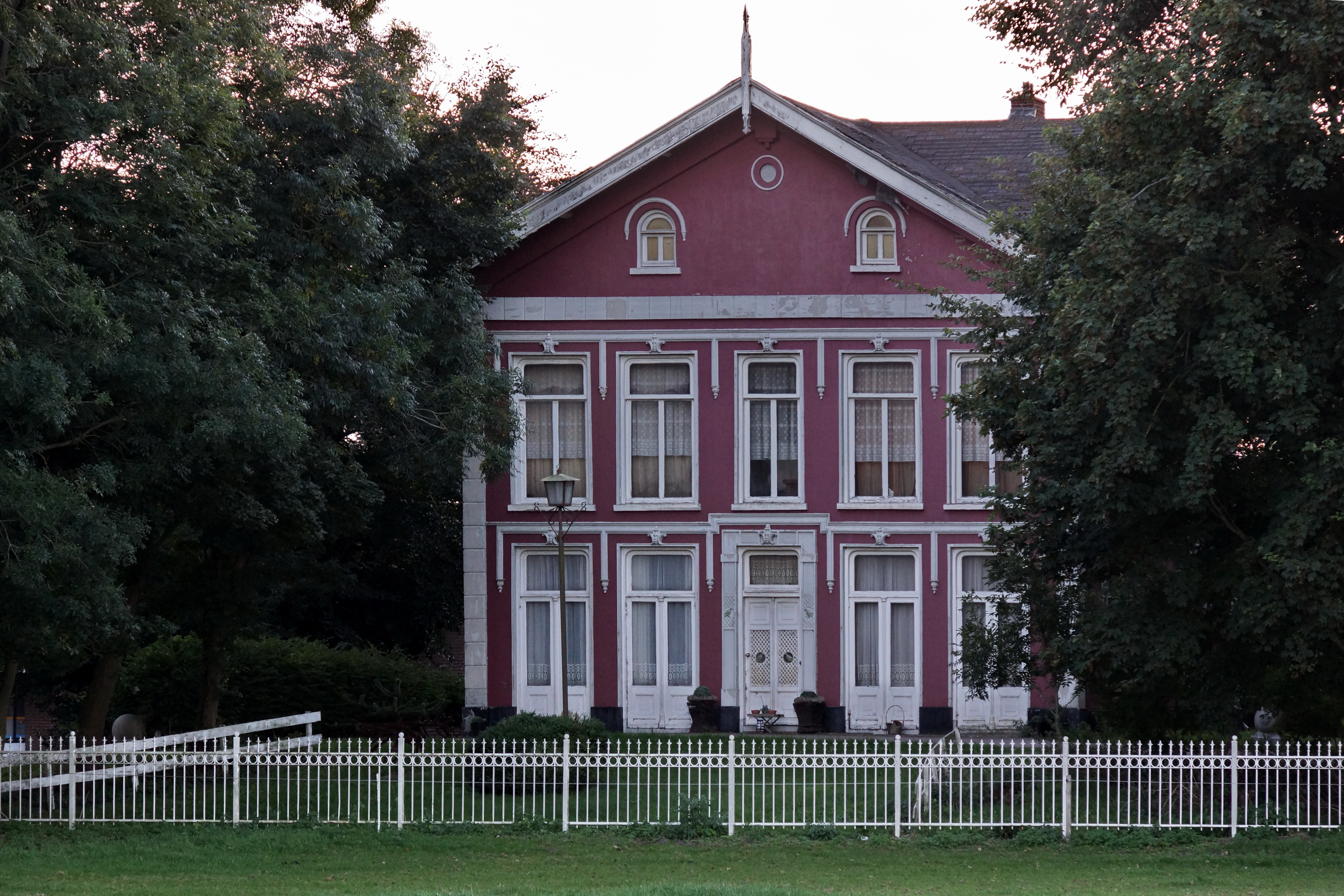
Koningshoef Mansion, built in 1865, reusing parts of a demolished church
