= Walter II, Lord of Egmond =

- Born: c. 1283; Egmond aan den Hoef
- Died: 3 September 1321
- Buried: Egmond Abbey
- Noble family: House of Egmond
- Spouse: Beatrix of Doortogne
- Issue: John I, Lord of Egmond; Walter; Yda; Sofia; Gerald
- Father: Gerald II of Egmond (c. 1255–1300)
- Mother: Elisabeth van Strijen (†1297)

Walter II, Lord of Egmond (in Dutch: Wouter II van Egmond) (c. 1283 – 3 September 1321) was Lord of Egmond.

Egmond coat of arms

He was the second surviving son of Gerald/Gerard II of Egmond, who had died in 1300 before his own father William II, Lord of Egmond. Walter became Lord of Egmond when his older brother, William III, died without offspring on 2 July 1312. Under his rule the relationships of the house with the Egmond Abbey were normalized. In 1315 he participated with 60 of his people in a military expedition to Flanders. Before 1310 he married Beatrijs van der Doirtoghe/Doortoge (c. 1290 -11 September 1323) from Naaldwijk. with whom he had five surviving children:

- John I, Lord of Egmond (c. 1310 – 1369)
- Walter/Wouter (* c. 1314)
- Yda (c. 1317 – 1366)
- Sofia (* c. 1319)
- Gerald/Gerrit (c. 1320 – c. 1397)

Walter II, Lord of Egmond House of Egmond Born: c. 1283 3 September
Preceded by William III	Lord of Egmond; 1312–1321	Succeeded by John I
