= John IV of Egmont =

16th century nobility in Habsburg Netherlands

Egmond coat of arms

John IV of Egmont (or Egmond) (1499, Egmond aan den Hoef – April 1528, near Ferrara) was second Count of Egmont, Lord of Hoogwoud, Aartswoud and Baer, and tenth Free Lord of Purmerend, Purmerland and Ilpendam. He belonged to the House of Egmond. John was the eldest surviving son of John III of Egmont and Magdalena van Werdenburg.

In 1516 he succeeded his father as Count of Egmont and was made a Knight in the Order of the Golden Fleece. Charles V, Holy Roman Emperor made him in 1527 head of the light infantry in Naples and Milan. One year later, John died near Ferrara, aged 29.

== Marriage and Children ==
John married in 1516 in Brussels with Françoise of Luxembourg (1495–1557), daughter of James II of Luxembourg. They had three children:

- Margaretha (1517 – 10 March 1554, Bar-le-Duc), married Nicolas, Duke of Mercœur (1524–1577) and mother of Louise of Lorraine, Queen consort of France and Poland by marriage to Henri III of France.
- Karel (Charles) (died in Cartagena on 7 December 1541, after falling ill during the failed Algiers expedition), third count of Egmont
- Lamoraal (1522–1568), fourth Count of Egmont.
