= Arnold I of Egmond =

Arnold I, Lord of Egmond
- Egmond coat of arms
- Born: c. 1337
- Died: 9 April 1409
- Noble family: House of Egmond
- Spouse: Jolanthe of Leiningen
- Issue: John II, Lord of Egmond; William
- Father: John I, Lord of Egmond
- Mother: Guida of IJsselstein

Arnold I of Egmond, in Dutch Arnoud, Arend, or Arent van Egmond, (c. 1337 – 9 April 1409) was Lord of Egmond and IJsselstein.

He was the son of John I of Egmond and his wife, Guida of IJsselstein. From 1372, he was a member of the ministerial council of Albert of Bavaria. In 1394 he founded a Cistercian monastery outside the walls of IJsselstein. In Egmond aan den Hoef he renovated the chapel at the ancestral castle, surrounded the castle with a moat, and had a canal dug to connect it with Alkmaar. In 1396, he participated in the military campaign in West Friesland. In 1398, he was enfeoffed with the Lordship of Ameland and het Bildt. He was commander of the Dutch troops who were tasked with stabilizing Frisia. There was a dispute with Count William VI of Holland, because Arnold supported the Cod side in the Hook and Cod wars. Arnold died at the age of 72 and was buried in the monastery at IJsselstein.

Arnold married Jolanthe of Leiningen (d. 24 April 1434, the daughter of Frederick VII of Leiningen-Dagsburg and Jolanthe of Jülich). They had two surviving sons:

- John II (c. 1385–1451), his successor
- William (c. 1387–1451)

Arnold I of Egmond House of Egmond Born: c. 1337 Died: 9 April 1409
Preceded by John I	Lord of Egmond; 1369–1409	Succeeded by John II
Preceded by John I	Lord of IJsselstein; 1369–1409	Succeeded by John II
