= Philip, Count of Egmont =

16th Century Count of Egmont

Coat of arms of the House of Egmond.

Philip, Count of Egmont (1558 – Ivry 14 March 1590) was the fifth Count of Egmont, prince of Gavere and 12th and last Lord of Purmerend, Purmerland and Ilpendam.

He was the eldest son and successor of Lamoral, Count of Egmont, who was beheaded by the Spanish in 1568 in Brussels.

William of Orange was his guardian, and the first years of his military career, Philip fought in the army of the Dutch rebels. He was present in the lost Battle of Gembloux in 1578.
But in 1579, Philip broke off all contact with William of Orange and offered his services to King Philip II of Spain, for whom he reconquered several cities. For this he was made a Knight in the Order of the Golden Fleece.
He was killed in 1590 in the Battle of Ivry against the new King Henry IV of France.

Philip had married on 27 September 1579 with Marie of Horne. They had no children. He was succeeded by his younger brother Lamoral.
