= Arnold, Lord of IJsselstein =

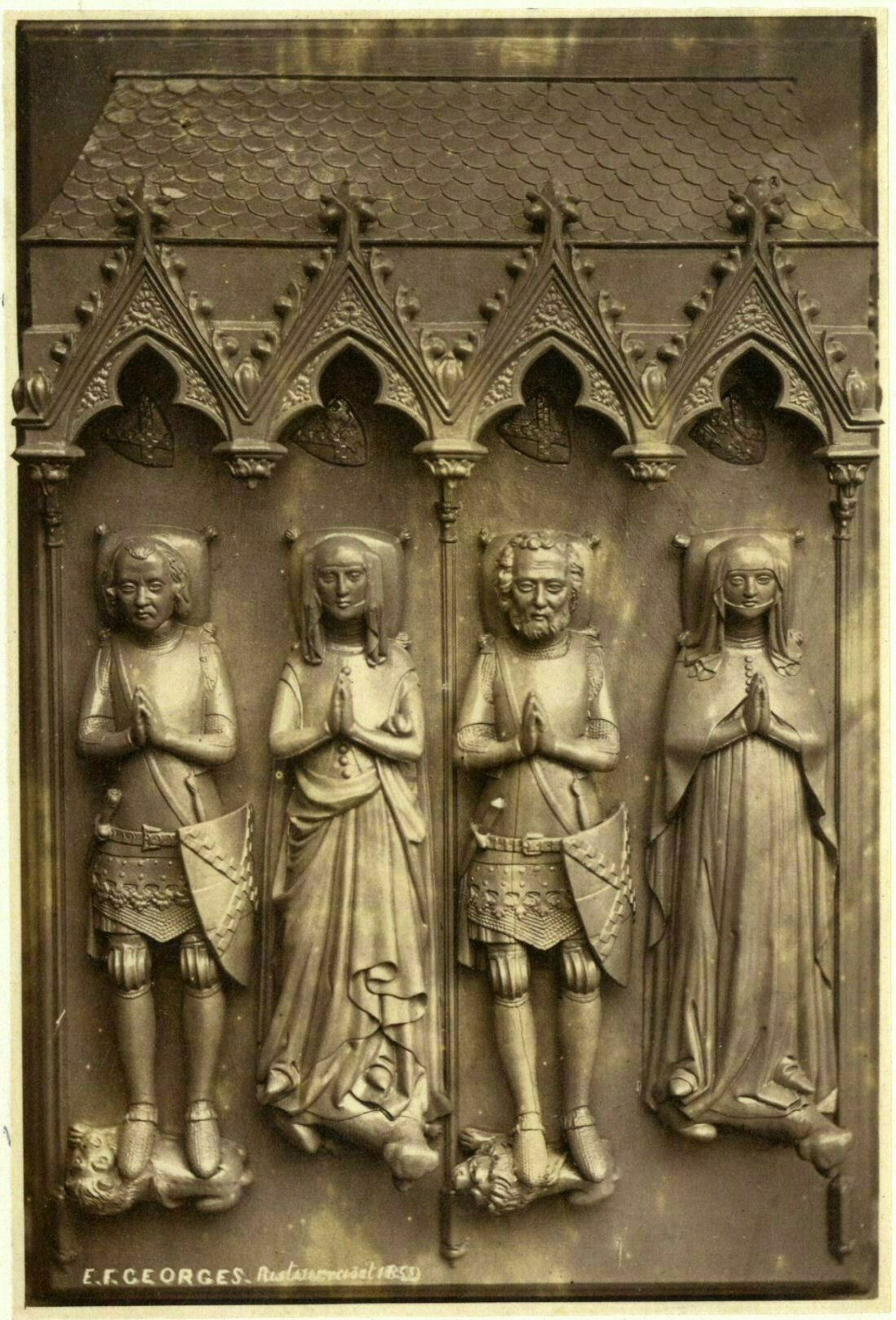
- Tomb of Arnold and his father Gijsbrecht
- Born: 1304
- Died: 12 February 1363
- Buried: St. Nicholas church in IJsselstein
- Noble family: Van Aemstel family
- Spouse: Maria of Avenes
- Issue: Guida
- Father: Gijsbrecht, Lord of IJsselstein
- Mother: Bertha of Heukelom

Arnold, Lord of IJsselstein (also known as Arnoud, 1304 – 12 February 1363) was the second Lord of IJsselstein and Stoutenburg and Schout of Amersfoort and the Eem Valley.

== Life ==
He was a son of Gijsbrecht, Lord of IJsselstein and Bertha of Heukelom. From 1312, he is mentioned as a knight. Between 1314 and 1325, he held various offices in the Bishopric of Utrecht, such as Schout of Amersfoort and the Eem Valley.

In 1344, he succeeded his father as Lord of IJsselstein. His position was confirmed by Count William IV of Holland. He acted as a councillor for the Count of Holland between 1345 and 1348 and again from 1354 to 1357. He tried to remain neutral during the Hook and Cod wars. Arnold was particularly interested in the medical science and founded the medical library of the hospital in IJsselstein

He was married to Maria of Avenes, a daughter of bishop Guy of Utrecht. They had a daughter named Guida, who married John I, Lord of Egmond. Guida succeeded Arnold as Lady of IJsselstein.

Arnold died in 1363 and was buried in the Saint Nicholas church in IJsselstein.

Arnold, Lord of IJsselstein Van Aemstel family Born: 1304 Died: 12 February 1363
Preceded by Gijsbrecht	Lord of IJsselstein; 1344-1363	Succeeded by Guida and John I
