= Frederik of Egmont =

Lord of IJsselstein & councillor of Charles the Bold + Maximillian I

Frederik Egmond
- Coat of arms
- Died: 1521
- Noble family: House of Egmond
- Spouses: Aleida of Culemborg, Walburga of Manderscheid
- Issue Detail: Floris van Egmont
- Father: William IV, Lord of Egmont
- Mother: Walburga of Meurs

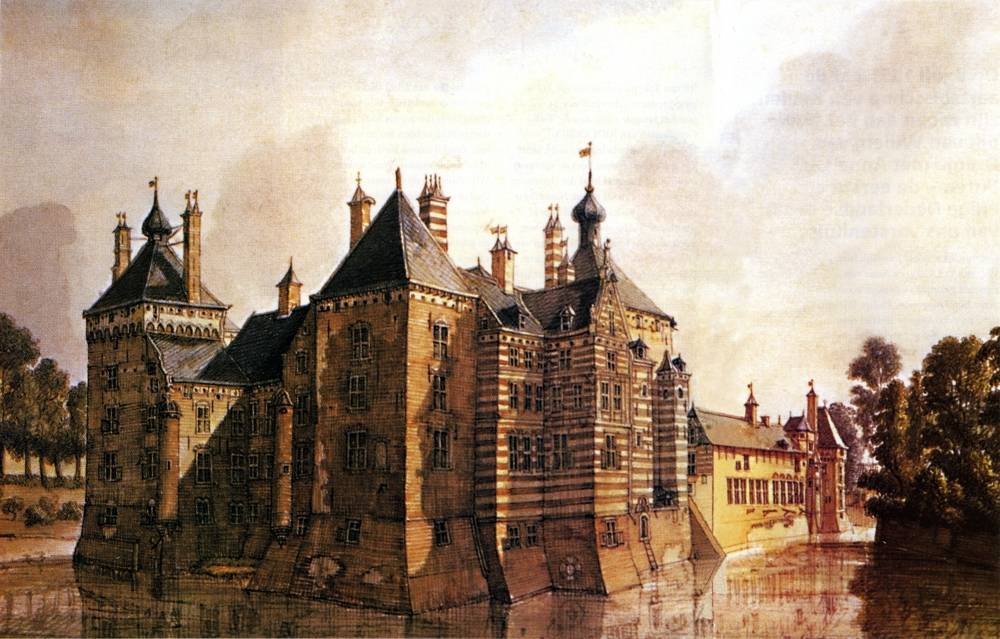
Buren castle, residence of Frederik van Egmond

Frederik of Egmont (ca. 1440–1521) was count of Buren and Leerdam, Lord of IJsselstein and councilor of Charles the Bold and Maximilian I.

Frederik was the second son of William II of Egmont and Walburga of Meurs. Together with his brothers, he participated in his father's campaign in the Duchy of Guelders. When Burgundy had conquered the Duchy, Frederik received some important functions there. In the 1480s he supported the policies of Maximilian I of Austria. He was present at Maximilian's coronation as Holy Roman Emperor in 1486, and led in 1488 an army against the city of Bruges that held Emperor Maximilian hostage.

In 1492, Maximilian gave him the titles of Count of Buren and Count of Leerdam. In 1499, he became a sworn member of the Illustrious Brotherhood of Our Blessed Lady in 's-Hertogenbosch.

== Marriage and children ==
In 1464 Frederik married Aleida of Culemborg, Lady of Sint-Maartensdijk (died 1471). They had:

- Floris, his successor (1470–1539)
- Wemmer van Egmont van Buren (died young)

In 1502, he remarried with Walburga of Manderscheid (died 1527).

Frederik also had several illegitimate children:

- Christoffel van IJsselstein, bailiff of Sint Maartensdijk and Scherpenisse (cited 1500–1505)
- Willem van Egmond
- Katharina van Egmond, married Lodewijk van Praet van Moerkerken in 1497.
