= House of Egmond =

Dutch noble family

House of Egmond Maison d'Egmond Huis Egmond Egmont
- noble family
- Coat of Arms
- Country: Netherlands
- Founded: 13th century
- Founder: Wouter of Egmond
- Titles: Lord, Baron, Count, Prince, Duke
- Dissolution: 17th century

The House of Egmond or Egmont (French: Maison d'Egmond, Dutch: Huis Egmond) is named after the Dutch town of Egmond, province of North Holland, and played an important role in the Netherlands during the Middle Ages and the Early modern period. The main lines Egmond-Geldern (Dukes of Geldern and Counts of Zutphen, extinct in 1538), Egmond-Gavere (Counts of Egmont, Princes of Gavere and Steenhuyze, extinct in 1682/1714) and Egmond-Buren-Leerdam (Counts of Buren and Leerdam, extinct in 1558) had high noble, princely rank.

Besides the main and secondary lines that have died out, there were also some illegitimate lines of the family, including the Egmond van Merenstein (extinct in 1559), Egmond van Kenenburg (extinct in 1703), Egmond van de Nijenburg (Imperial Barons; extinct in 1747) and Egmond van Cranenburch. Today there are still the extramarital lines of the Imperial Counts of Geldern-Egmond (today Mirbach-Geldern-Egmond) and the Barons of IJsselstein (also IJsselstein or Ysselstein).

== History ==
They were one of the principal noble families of the County of Holland during the Middle Ages. The family said to be descendants of the Kings of Friesland and early Counts of future Holland, maintained some power due to its hereditary position as Voogd (Advocate) of the powerful Egmond Abbey in North Holland. They built their residence in Egmond aan den Hoef and became the Lords of Egmond. Thanks to a number of judicious marriages they were able to add the strategically important Lordship of IJsselstein and the semi-sovereign territory of the Lords of Arkel to their domains.

The family achieved even greater prominence in the period of Burgundian and Habsburg rule over the Netherlands. In the late 15th century, the senior branch became the sovereign Dukes of Guelders, whilst the younger branch split into the Counts of Egmond (elevated to become Princes of Gavere in 1553) and the Counts of Buren and Leerdam. The senior branches of the family moved out in the 16th and 17th centuries, but illegitimate branches (such as that of the Bavarian Counts of Geldern-Egmond) flourished well into the 20th century.

The execution of Lamoral, Count of Egmont in 1568 helped spark the Dutch Revolt that eventually led to the independence of the Netherlands, while Anna van Egmond-Buren, known as Anna van Buren in the Netherlands, was the first wife of William the Silent, the leader of this national uprising. Ironically, in 1573 both Egmond Abbey and Egmond Castle were destroyed on order of William the Silent.

Though the family name may not be carried, direct descendants of the family are in existence, thus, not extinct.

== Notable members of the family ==
For the earlier lords, see List of Lords and Counts of Egmont.

- John I, Lord of Egmond (before 1310–1369), Lord of Egmond and IJsselstein, stadtholder of Holland.
  - Arnold I, Lord of Egmond (c. 1340–1409), Lord of Egmont and IJsselstein.
    - John II, Lord of Egmond (c. 1385–1451), Regent of Guelders, Lord of Egmont.
      - Arnold of Egmond (1410–1473), Duke of Guelders and Count of Zutphen.
        - Mary of Guelders (1434–1463), Queen consort of Scotland, spouse of James II.
        - Adolf, Duke of Guelders (1438–1477), Duke of Guelders and Count of Zutphen.
          - Philippa of Guelders (1467–1547)
          - Charles, Duke of Guelders (1467–1538), Duke of Guelders and Count of Zutphen.
        - Catherine of Guelders (1439–1496), Regentess of Guelders.
      - William IV of Egmont (1412–1483), Lord of Egmont and IJsselstein, stadtholder of Guelders.
        - John III of Egmont (1438–1516), 1st Count of Egmont, 8th Lord of Purmerend, Purmerland and Ilpendam, stadtholder of Holland, Zeeland and West-Friesland.
          - John IV of Egmont (1499–1528), 2nd Count of Egmont, 9th Lord of Purmerend, Purmerland and Ilpendam
            - Charles I of Egmont (d. 1541), 3rd Count of Egmont, 10th Lord of Purmerend, Purmerland and Ilpendam
            - Lamoral, Count of Egmont (1522–1568), 4th Count of Egmont, Prince of Gavere and Steenhuyze, 11th Lord of Purmerend, Purmerland and Ilpendam, stadtholder of Flanders and Artois etc.
              - Philip, Count of Egmont (1558–1590), 5th Count of Egmont, Prince of Gavere and Steenhuyze, 12th and last Lord of Purmerend, Purmerland and Ilpendam.
              - Lamoral II of Egmont (d. 1617), 6th Count of Egmont, Prince of Gavere and Steenhuyze
              - Charles II of Egmont (1567–1620), 7th Count of Egmont, Prince of Gavere and Steenhuyze, married to Marie de Lens, Lady of Aubigny.
                - Alberta of Egmont, married to René de Renesse, 1st Count of Warfusée
                - Louis of Egmont (1600–1654), 8th Count of Egmont, Prince of Gavere and Steenhuyze
                  - Louis Philip of Egmont (1630–1682), 9th Count of Egmont, Prince of Gavere and Steenhuyze
                    - Marie Claire of Egmont (1661–1714), 12th Countess of Egmont, Princess of Gavere m. Niccolo Pignatelli, Duke of Bisaccia
                      - Egmont Pignatelli family, extinct in 1809.
                    - Louis Ernest of Egmont (1665–1693), 10th Count of Egmont, Prince of Gavere
                    - Procope François of Egmont (1669–1707), 11th Count of Egmont, Prince of Gavere
          - George van Egmond (1504–1559), Bishop of Utrecht
        - Frederik van Egmond (c. 1440–1521), Count of Buren and Leerdam, Lord of IJsselstein etc.
          - Floris van Egmont (1470–1539), Count of Buren and Leerdam, stadtholder of Guelders and Friesland.
            - Maximiliaan van Egmond (1509–1548), Count of Buren, Leerdam and Lingen, stadtholder of Friesland.
              - Anna van Egmont (1533–1558), Countess of Lingen, Buren and Leerdam, Lady of IJsselstein etc.
            - Anna van Egmont the Elder (1504–1574), Countess of Horne
          - (illeg.) Christoffel van IJsselstein
        - William of Egmond jr. (died 1494), stadtholder of Guelders.

Genealogy of the House of Egmont

House of Egmont

HOUSE OF EGMONT
Ratbold I van Egmont ( - 791) heer van Egmond, - 791
Gerbrand van Egmont ( - 845) heer van Egmond, 791 - 845
Wolbrand van Egmont ( - 869) heer van Egmond, 845 - 869
Radbold II van Egmont ( - 920) heer van Egmond, 869 - 920
Dodo I van Egmont (~ca. 940 - 977) heer van Egmond, 920 - 977
Walger van Egmont (~976 - 1036) nl:Lijst van heren en graven van Egmond, 977 - 1036
Dodo II van Egmont (~1010 - 1074) heer van Egmond, 1036 - 1074
Beerwout I van Egmont (? - 1114) heer van Egmond, 1074 - 1114
Beerwout II van Egmont (1094 - 1158) heer van Egmond, ~ 1114 - 1158
Allard van Egmont (1130 - 1168) heer van Egmond, 1158	Dodo van Egmont (1131 - 1200)
Wouter or Beerwout III van Egmont; Kwade Wouter (ca. 1145 - 1208) heer van Egmond	Allard van Egmont (1150 - 12??), heer van Buren.
Willem I van Egmont (ca.1180 - 1234)) heer van Egmond, 1208	Gerard van Egmont (d 1217)
Gerard van Egmont (ca. 1200 - 1242) heer van Egmond, 1234	Wouter van Egmont d. 1223 heer van Meerestein
Willem II van Egmont (1235? - 1304) heer van Egmond, 1242	Wouter “Stoutkind” van Egmont (d. 1272) heer van Meeresteinguardian of Willem II van Egmont; m. Beatrix van Haarlem
Gerhard von Egmond (*ca 1260 - 1300) m.1280 Elisabeth van Strijen (*ca 1262 +1297)	Floris Wouterszoon; Recorded as castellan of Medemblik in 1296 and bailiff in 1298.
Willem III van Egmond (ca. 1281 +1312) heer van Egmond, 1304 m.Margareta von Blankenheim (+1312)	Wouter II van Egmond *ca 1283, +3.9.1321 heer van Egmond, 1312 m.Beatrijs van de Doortoge (*Naaldwijk ca 1290, +11.9.1323), dau.of Dirk van der Doortege	Nikolaus, +1305	Johann, +1312	Aelbrecht Floriszoon van Egmont ( ~ 1330 -) Knighted 1345; recorded as "of Meerestein" 1350 m. 1329, Elisabeth van der Woude
Jan I van Egmond(en) (Egmond-Binnen ca 1310, +Ijsselstein 28.12.1368) heer van Egmond, Stattholder of Holland, m.1331 Guyote van Amstel Ijsselstein (*ca 1314 +ca 1377), dau.of Arend van Amstel, Heer van Ijsselstein	Gerrit, Stattholder of Holland, *ca 1320, +before 25.10.1398; m.Johanna van Raephorst	Walter, fl 1459	Jan Aelbrechtsz van Egmont van Meerestein
William (1364 – 1402, Duke of Geldre, 1377, & III of Jülich, 1393 ∞ Katherine of Bavaria	Reinald IV (c. 1365 – 1423); Duke of Geldre & duke of Jülich, 1402	Joanna of Jülich ∞ John V lord of Arkel	Arend van Egmond (ca. 1337 - 1409) heer van Egmond, Heer van IJsselstein, van Zegwaard military officer	Wilhelm, fl 1370/1410; m.Mechtild von Hemert	Gerrit, fl 1370/1404; m.ca 1380 Wilhelmina von Wateringen	Albrecht, a canon in Utrecht	Aelbrecht Jansz van Egmont heer van Meerestein (~ 1365-1461) m. Agnes van Beesde. Their children included Otto van Egmont van Meerestein, identified as the founder of the Kenenburg line.
Maria van Arkel	Jan II van Egmont (en) (c. 1385 – 1451) lord of Egmond, 1409 regent of Geldre	Willem, (ca 1387 - 1451) m.ca 1442 Anne de Henin (+1478)	Otto van Egmont van Meerestein m. Machteld van der Goye.
Katharina van Kleef (1417-1476)	Arnold van Egmont (en) (1410 – 1473); Duke of Geldre , 1423-1465, 1471-1473; HOUSE OF EGMONT	Willem IV van Egmont (en) (1412–1483); Lord of Egmont and IJsselstein, stadtholder of Guelders	Albrecht van Egmont van Meerestein c. 1426–1487 m. Haze de Blote van Lievenburgh; Through this marriage, Kenenburg came into the family's possession around 1460.
Maria van Egmont-Gelre(en) (ca. 1429/1434-1463); Queen consort of Scotland, spouse of James II	Willem van Egmont (1434-jong overleden)	Margaretha van Egmont (1436-1486)	Catharina of Bourbon (1440-1469)	Adolf van Egmond (en) (Grave, 12 februari 1438 – Doornik, 27 juni 1477); Duke of Geldre, 1465-1471, 1477	Catharina van Egmont (ca. 1440-1497), regent of Geldre, 1477 - 1492 (Was appt. by the States of Guelders as regent as long as there was no duke. Rule contested by Maximilian of Austria.)	Jan III van Egmont (en) (1438 – 1516); Lord of Egmond, 1483-1516, created Count of Egmond, 1486; Heer van Purmerland en Ilpendam, 1483; Stadhouder van Holland, Zeeland en West-Friesland, 1483-1515	Frederik van Egmont (en) (ca 1440 – 1521); Count of Buren and Leerdam, 1492; Lord of IJsselstein, 1464; Stadhouder van Gelre en Zutphen, 1507 - 1511; Stadhouder van Friesland, 1515 - 1518	Willem van Egmont (d.1494) stadhouder van Gelre
Maria ∞ John III duke of Cleves; HOUSE OF LA MARCK	Filippa van Egmont (1467 - 1547) m. Rene II, Duke of Lorraine from here the House of Lorraine desc. & claims Geldre	Karel van Gelre (en) (Grave, 9 november 1467 – Arnhem, 30 juni 1538); Duke of Geldre ,1492–1538 m. Elisabeth van Brunswijk-Lüneburg	Jan IV van Egmont (en); 1499–1528); 2nd Count of Egmont, 9th Lord of Purmerend, Purmerland and Ilpendam knight of the Golden Fleece m. Francisca van Luxemburg(en)	Philip van Egmond (1502 - 1529), heer van Baer	Jurrien van Egmond (1503), abt van St. Amant, heer van Baer. He gave the lordship of Baer to Karel, the oldest son of his brother Jan.	George or Joris van Egmont (ca. 1504 - 1559) bishop of Utrecht, 1534	Floris van Egmont (en) (1470–1539); Count of Buren and Leerdam (en), 1521; Stadtholder of Guelders, 1507-1511 & and Friesland, 1515-18 knight of the Golden Fleece
Margaretha (1517 – Bar-le-Duc 10 march 1554), gehuwd met Nicolaas van Lotharingen (1524 – 1577)	Karel († Cartagena 7 december 1541); 3rd Count of Egmont, 10th Lord of Purmerend, Purmerland and Ilpendam, 1528 lord of Baer	Lamoraal (en) (1522 – executed 1568); 4th Count of Egmont, 11th Lord of Purmerend, Purmerland and Ilpendam, lord of Baer, 1541; Prince of Gavere, 1553; Captain General of the Lowlands under Charles V knight of the Golden Fleece,1546, Imperial Chamberlain. defeated the French in the battles of Saint-Quentin (1557) and Gravelines (1558). Stadholder of Flanders and Artois, 1559	Maximiliaan van Egmont(en) (1509–1548); Count of Buren and Leerdam (en) and Lingen, 1539; Stadtholder of Friesland, 1540-48 knight of the Golden Fleece m. Françoise de Lannoy (1513-1562)
Filips van Egmont (en) (1558–1590); 5th Count of Egmont, 12th & last Lord of Purmerend, Purmerland and Ilpendam, lord of Baer, 1541; Prince of Gavere, 1568, knight of Golden Fleece,	Lamoraal II van Egmont (1565? - 1617); 6th Count of Egmont, Prince of Gavere, 1590, estates confiscated by States of Holland	Karel II van Egmont (en) (1567–1620); 7th Count of Egmont, Prince of Gavere, 1617; Knight of Golden Fleece,1599; Gov of Namur	William the Silent, Prince of Orange	Anna van Egmond (en) (1533-1558); Countess of Buren and Leerdam, 1546 (en) and Lingen, 1539
Lodewijk van Egmont (en) (1600–1654); 8th Count of Egmont, Prince of Gavere, 1620; Knight of Golden Fleece	Maurice of Nassau; Prince of Orange, 1618; Count of Buren and Leerdam, defacto, 1584, in sui juris 1618 (en)	Frederick Henry of Orange; Prince of Orange; Count of Buren and Leerdam, 1625 (en)	Filips Willem van Oranje (en) (1554 – 1618); Prince of Orange, 1584 Count of Buren and Leerdam, 1558 (en); Knight of Golden Fleece, 1599	Maria van Nassau (en) (1556–1616) m. 1595 graaf Filips van Hohenlohe (1550-1606)
Lodewijk Filips van Egmont (en) (1630–1682); 9th Count of Egmont, Prince of Gavere, 1654; Knight of Golden Fleece, 1670; Spanish Captain-General, Ambassador in London, Viceroy of Sardinia
Lodewijk Ernest van Egmont (1665 - 1693); 10th Count of Egmont, Prince of Gavere, 1682; Knight of Golden Fleece a Spanish General	Procop Frans van Egmond ( 1664 - 1707); 11th Count of Egmont, Prince of Gavere, 1654 a Spanish General m.1697 Louise de Cosnac (*1674/75 - 1717), dau.of Marquis Francois de Cosnac	Maria Clara van Egmont (1661 - 1714) m. Niccolo Pignatelli, Duca di Bisaccia (*1658 - 1719), son of Don Carlo Pignatelli, Duca di Bisaccia and Donna Chiara del Giudice, desc.	Marie Therese; m.Albert Louis Ghislain de Trazegnies, Comte de Trazegnies, Vicomte d'Arnemuiden (+1710), son of Octave Joseph de Trazegnies, Comte de Flechin, Vicomte d'Arnemuyden

== Coat of arms ==
Shield: Or, seven chevronels gules. The Egmond coat of arms is depicted in the medieval Gelre Armorial (folio 83v)

== Note ==
The Irish Perceval family, which erroneously claims descent from the house of Egmond, was admitted to the Irish peerage as Earls of Egmont in 1722.

== See also ==
- List of Lords and Counts of Egmont
- Barony of IJsselstein
- Duchy of Guelders
- Zutphen County
- County of Buren and Leerdam
- Lordship of Purmerend, Purmerland and Ilpendam
- Principality of Gavere
- Egmont pact
- Egmont Palace
