= John II of Egmond =

Lord of Egmond

John II, Lord of Egmond
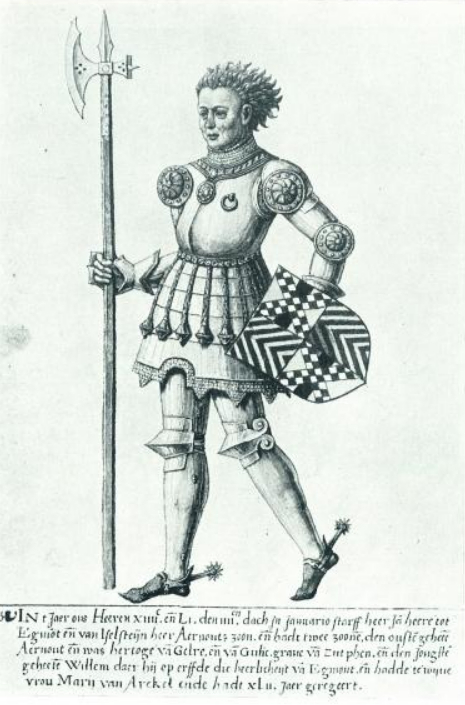
- Born: c. 1385
- Died: 4 January 1451 (aged 65–66)
- Noble family: House of Egmond
- Spouse: Maria van Arkel
- Issue: Arnold, Duke of Guelders; William IV, Lord of Egmont
- Father: Arnold I
- Mother: Jolanthe of Leiningen

John II, Lord of Egmond (c. 1385 – 4 January 1451) was the son of Arnold I of Egmond (d. 9 April 1409, the son of John I and Guida D'Armstall) and Jolanthe of Leiningen (d. 24 April 1434, the daughter of Frederick VIII of Leningen and Jolanthe of Jülich).

John II, also known as "Jan met de Bellen" due to a belt adorned with bells that he wore in battle, was a prominent nobleman in the Netherlands. Born circa 1385, he inherited the titles of Lord of Egmond and IJsselstein after his father's death in 1409. His marriage to Maria van Arkel in 1409 further strengthened his position, and he became one of the most powerful nobles in the region. John served as regent of Geldern for a time after his son's appointment as Duke of Guelders. He played a significant role in the political conflicts of the time, aligning with various factions and taking part in multiple disputes, particularly involving the Egmond Abbey. John II died on January 4, 1451, and was buried in Egmond-Binnen. His legacy continued through his sons, Arnold, Duke of Guelders, and William II, Lord of Egmond.

== Family ==
On 23 June 1409, John married Maria van Arkel daughter of John V van Arkel and Joanna of Jülich, and had two sons:

- Arnold, Duke of Guelders
- William IV, Count of Egmond
