= John I of Egmond =

John I, Lord of Egmond
- Egmond coat of arms
- Born: before 1310
- Died: 1369
- Buried: Church in IJsselstein
- Noble family: House of Egmond
- Spouse: Guida of IJsselstein
- Issue Detail: Arnold I, Lord of Egmond; Gerry; Albert
- Father: Walter II, Lord of Egmond
- Mother: Beatrix of Doortogne

John I, Lord of Egmond (before 1310 – 28 December 1369) was Lord of Egmond, Lord of IJsselstein, bailiff of Kennemerland (1353–1354) and stadtholder of Holland.

== Life ==
He was a son of Walter II and his wife, Beatrix of Doortogne. He is first mentioned in 1328, when he fights in the Battle of Cassel and accompanies Count William III of Holland to Flanders, to assist the Count of Flanders suppressing a rebellion in Bruges and the surrounding area.

In 1343, he is a member of a group of bailiffs who administer Holland while the Count is travelling. In 1344, he is enfeoffed with Nieuwendoorn castle. He participated in the third crusade of Count William IV to Prussia and in the Siege of Utrecht in 1345, but not in the disastrous Battle of Warns later that year.

In subsequent years, he played an important role in the politics of Holland. In 1350, he was one of the signatories of the Cod Alliance Treaty that set off the Hook and Cod wars. He fought in the Battle of Naarden in 1350 and in the Battle of Zwartewaal in 1351. He was then sent to England to mediate in the dispute between Countess Margaret and her son, Count William V, however, he was unsuccessful.

After he returned to Holland, he began a campaign against the citizens of Bunschoten in 1355. In the winter of 1356, he besieged the castle of Nyevelt, on the orders of the count, and took it after a seven-week siege. In 1356, William V appointed him governor of the area above the Meuse, jointly with his brother Gerry. In 1358, William V was declared insane by his brother Albert. John I was a member of the regency council. In 1359, he is one of the Cod leaders to sign a reconciliation with the city of Delft.

In 1363, his father-in-law, Lord Arnold of IJsselstein died and John I inherited the Lordship of IJsselstein.

He died in 1369 and was buried in the church of IJsselstein.

== Marriage and issue ==
He married Guida of IJsselstein and had the following children:

- Arnold (c. 1337– 1409), his successor
- Gerry
- Albert, a canon in Utrecht
- Beatrix, married Ghisbert of Vianen
- Bearte
- Maria (d. c. 1384), married Philip IV of Wassenaer
- Catherine, married Bartholomew of Raephorst
- Antonia, abbess in 's-Hertogenbosch
- Elisabeth
- Greta

== Footnotes ==
John I of Egmond House of Egmond Born: before 1310 Died: 28 December 1369
Preceded by Walter II	Lord of Egmond; 1324–1369	Succeeded by Arnold
Preceded by Arnold	Lord of IJsselstein; 1363–1369	Succeeded by Arnold
