= William IV, Lord of Egmont =

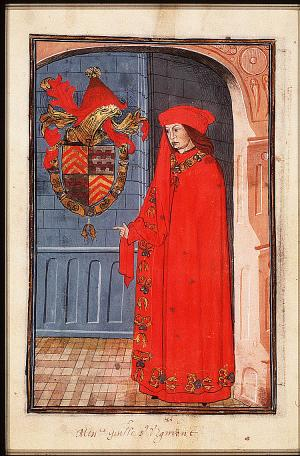
William IV of Egmont

William IV of Egmont (Dutch: Willem van Egmond) (26 January 1412 – 19 January 1483) was Lord of Egmond, IJsselstein, Schoonderwoerd and Haastrecht and Stadtholder of Guelders.

== Biography ==
William was a son of John II, Lord of Egmond and Maria van Arkel, and a younger brother of Arnold, Duke of Gelderland.
He travelled with his brothers to the Holy Land (1458–1464) and was received in Rome by Pope Pius II.

William stayed most of the time in Guelders, where he supported his brother against his nephew Adolf of Egmond. After the incarceration of his brother, William led the pro-Burgundy party.

When Charles the Bold, Duke of Burgundy took over power in Guelders in 1473, he made William Stadtholder. In 1477 Mary of Burgundy included William in her Great Council of Mechelen and made him Knight in the order of the Golden Fleece one year later.

== Marriage and children ==
On 22 January 1437 William married Walburga of Meurs, Lady of Baer and Lathum, daughter of Frederick IV, Count of Moers (†1448), and Engelberta of Cleves, by whom he had 4 daughters and 3 sons:

- John III of Egmont, Count of Egmond, stadtholder of Holland, Zeeland and West-Friesland;
- Frederik of Egmont, Count of Buren and Leerdam, Lord of IJsselstein;
- William of Egmont, stadtholder of Guelders.
- Anna, married Bernard van Bentheim
- Elisabeth, married Gijsbrecht van Bronckhorst
- Walburgia, a nun
- Margaretha, married Jan van Merode

Besides the children from his marriage Van Egmont had four children by different women:

- Nicholas of Egmond, was captured on the Valkhof 1478-1481 together with his half-brothers Frederick and William.
- Hendrik van Egmond ( -1511), whose mother was Aleid Kreijnck
- Frederik van Egmond
- Hendrika van Egmond, she married Willem van Tuyl Bulcke Steijn (-1449). He was a son of Willem Willemsz of Tuyll and Maggie Mate Nesse, daughter of Adriaen van Nesse Mate (1385-1435)

He is buried next to his brother, Duke Arnold of Gelderland.

Egmond coat of arms
