= Egmond (municipality) =

Former Dutch municipality

Coordinates: 52°36′59″N 4°36′59″E

Egmond (Dutch pronunciation: [ˈɛxmɔnt]) is a former municipality in the north-western Netherlands, in the province of North Holland. In 2001, it was merged with the municipalities of Schoorl and Bergen to form the municipality of Bergen. The three main villages in the former municipality are Egmond aan den Hoef, Egmond aan Zee and Egmond-Binnen. The place gave its name to the House of Egmond, who became the powerful protectors of Egmond Abbey, founded in the 9th-century in Egmond-Binnen, and who built their residence (hoeve/hoef) in Egmond aan den Hoef.

The French philosopher René Descartes lived in both Egmond aan den Hoef and Egmond-Binnen.
