= Hargen =

Hamlet in North Holland, Netherlands

- Hamlet
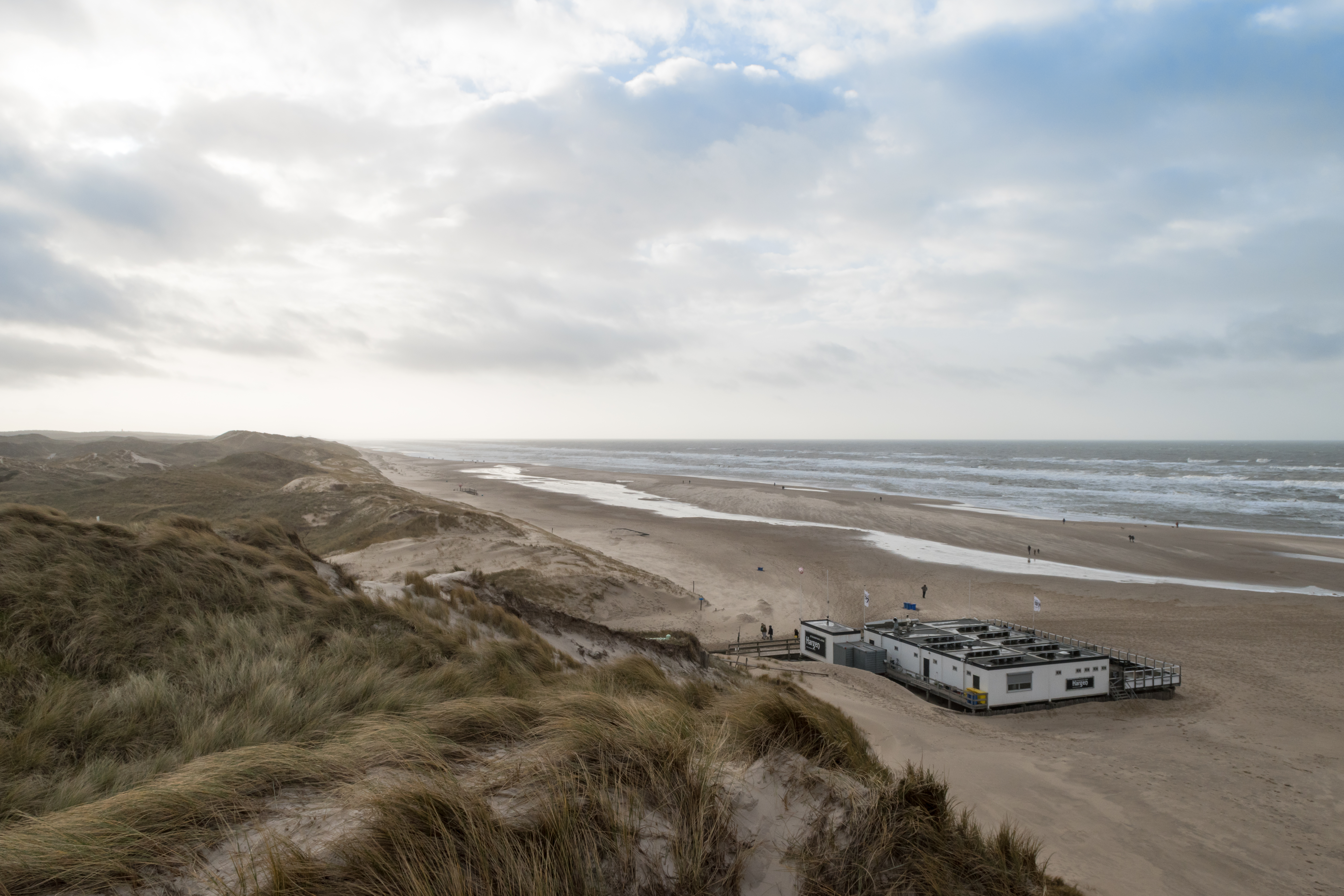
- The beach at Hargen aan Zee

- Location in the Netherlands Location in the province of North Holland in the Netherlands
- Coordinates: 52°43′36″N 4°39′30″E
- Country: Netherlands
- Province: North Holland
- Municipality: Bergen

Area
  - Total: 3.29 km^{2} (1.27 sq mi)
- Elevation: 4.9 m (16 ft)

Population (2021)
  - Total: 1,530
  - Density: 465/km^{2} (1,200/sq mi)
- Time zone: UTC+1 (CET)
  - Summer (DST): UTC+2 (CEST)
- Postal code: 1873
- Dialing code: 072

Hargen is a hamlet in the municipality of Bergen, in the provinces of North Holland, the Netherlands.

The hamlet was first mentioned between 822 and c. 825 as in Horgana, and means "sacred place". Hargen has no place signs, but there is a directional sign pointing to Hargen. It was home to 171 people in 1840. The current population is difficult to determine, because it has been added to the much larger Groet in the statistics.
