= Schoorl =

- Village
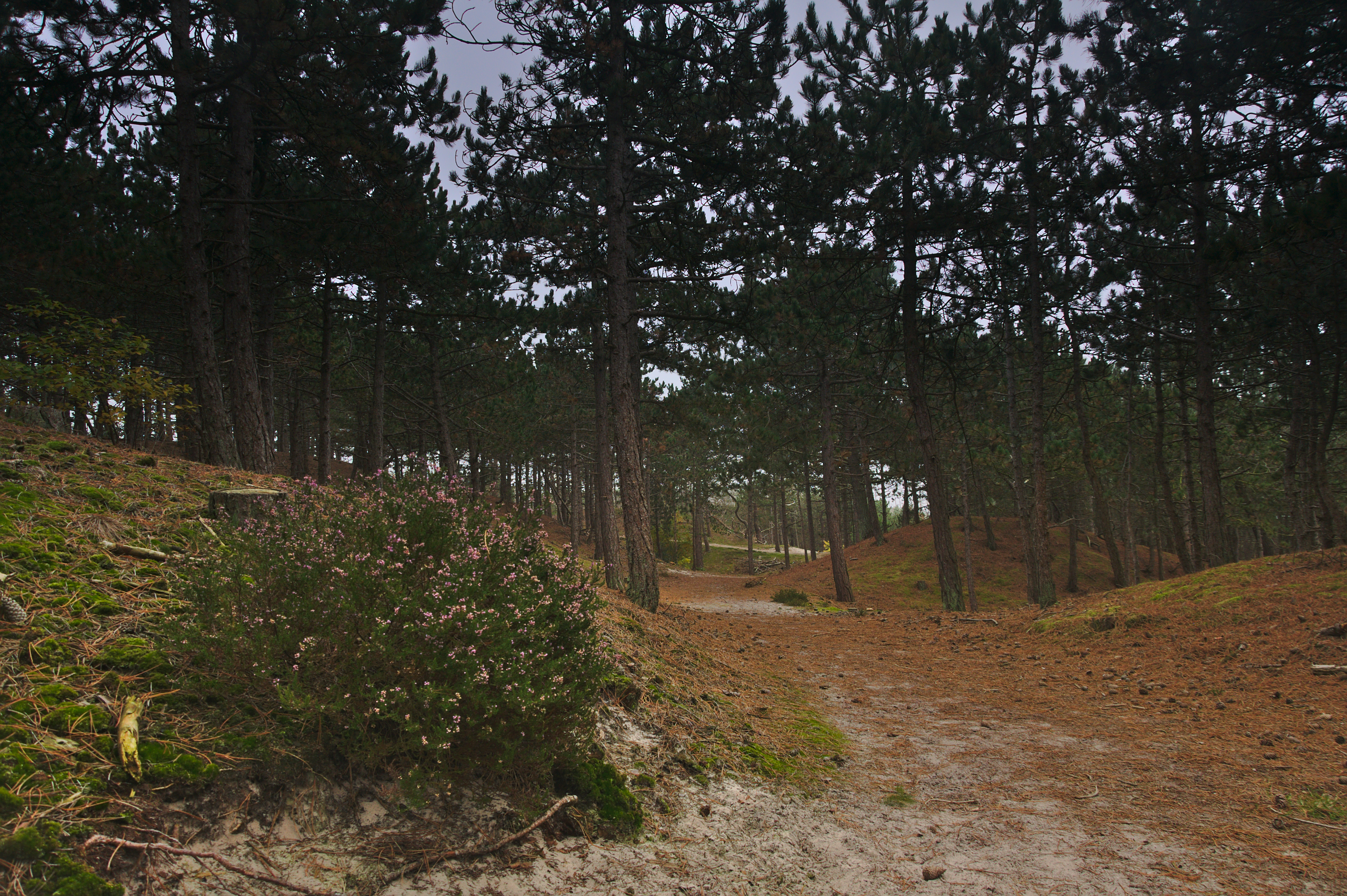

- Flag Coat of arms

- Location in the Netherlands Location in the province of North Holland in the Netherlands
- Coordinates: 52°42′N 4°42′E
- Country: Netherlands
- Province: North Holland
- Municipality: Bergen

Area
  - Total: 8.56 km^{2} (3.31 sq mi)
- Elevation: 2.2 m (7.2 ft)

Population (2021)
  - Total: 3,210
  - Density: 375/km^{2} (971/sq mi)
- Time zone: UTC+1 (CET)
  - Summer (DST): UTC+2 (CEST)
- Postal code: 1871
- Dialing code: 072

Schoorl is a village in the Dutch province of North Holland. It is a part of the municipality of Bergen, and lies about 8 km northwest of Alkmaar. Until 2001, Schoorl was also a municipality of its own.

Schoorl is a village in between the polder area of North Holland and the Schoorlse dunes. The village is about 8 km (5mi) long and never wider than 2 km (1mi). The village is heavily protected by the highest and widest dunes of the Netherlands, which reach about 54 m (164 ft) above sealevel right behind the center of Schoorl, and are more than 5 km (3mi) wide.

Schoorl is a major local tourism location in the summer and counts over 25 campsites, the largest concentration of campsites in the Netherlands.

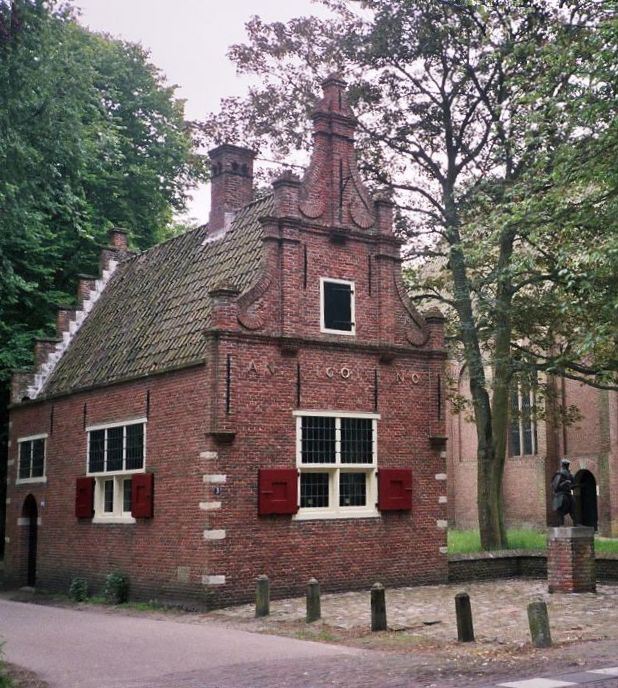
Raadhuisje Schoorl

The village, earlier named Scorel contains evidence of a long history in the form of two raadhuisjes (town hall) aging from 1600. The Dutch painter and evangelist Jan van Scorel was born here.

Meidenmarkt is the most renowned yearly festivity that is celebrated once a year on the second day (Monday) of pentecost (see also this list of dates to see when Pentecost begins). The celebration is a 100-year-old tradition where the local youngsters can meet partners of the opposite sex. The celebration takes place on the klimduin in the center of town. This klimduin is a century-old attraction and many Dutch people have visited it as part of a school trip.

During World War II, Kamp Schoorl was a concentration camp originally built as a Dutch army camp. Jews and political prisoners were imprisoned there and some were then deported in camps in the east where they were later murdered.

== Statistics ==
The former municipality of Schoorl also included Aagtdorp, Catrijp, Groet, and Camperduin, and had about 6500 inhabitants.

"Schoorl" was until about 200 years ago known as "Schorel" (also part known as "Schoreldam") and the family crest (coat of arms) is recorded as being St Michaels (the dragon slayer), and was found on a grave some 1,000 years old.

It appears that Jan van Schorel during his travelling through southern countries in Europe held it was easier to use the name Jan van Scorel, Jan van Schoorl, and other versions of his surname. Very old maps of North Holland/The Netherlands show "Schorel".
