= Bregtdorp =

- Hamlet
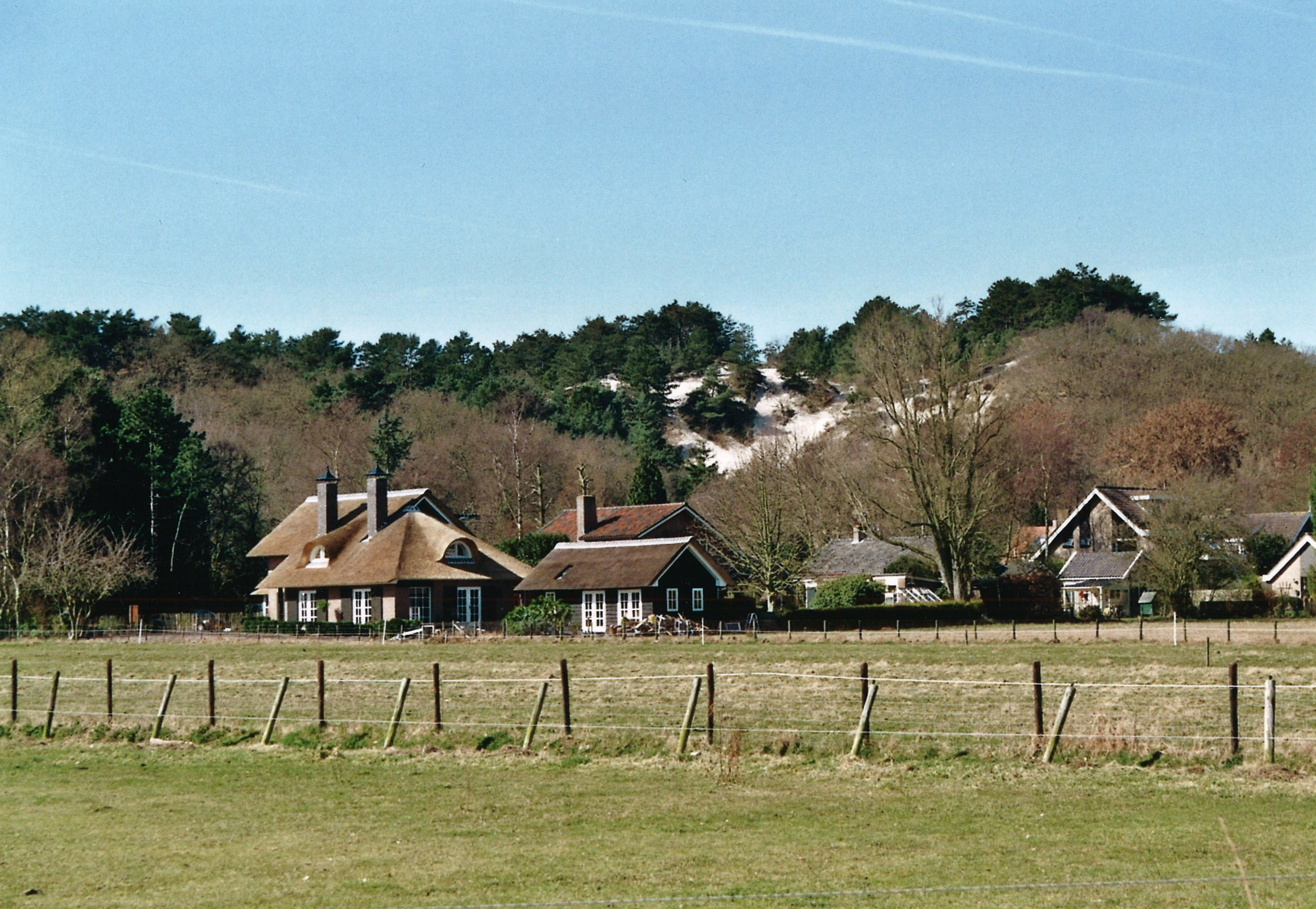
- View on Bregtdorp

- Location in the Netherlands Location in the province of North Holland in the Netherlands
- Coordinates: 52°43′N 4°41′E
- Country: Netherlands
- Province: North Holland
- Municipality: Bergen

Area
  - Total: 8.56 km^{2} (3.31 sq mi)
- Elevation: 2.2 m (7.2 ft)

Population (2021)
  - Total: 3,210
  - Density: 375/km^{2} (971/sq mi)
- Time zone: UTC+1 (CET)
  - Summer (DST): UTC+2 (CEST)
- Postal code: 1871
- Dialing code: 072

Bregtdorp is a hamlet in the municipality of Bergen, North Holland in the north-western Netherlands.

The village was first mentioned in 1843 as Bregdorp, and means "settlement of Bregt (person)". Bregtdorp has place name signs. The southern part of the hamlet was annexed by Schoorl. It was home to 109 people 1840. Nowadays, it consists of about 150 houses and 30 apartments in a retirement home.
