= Wimmenum =

- Hamlet
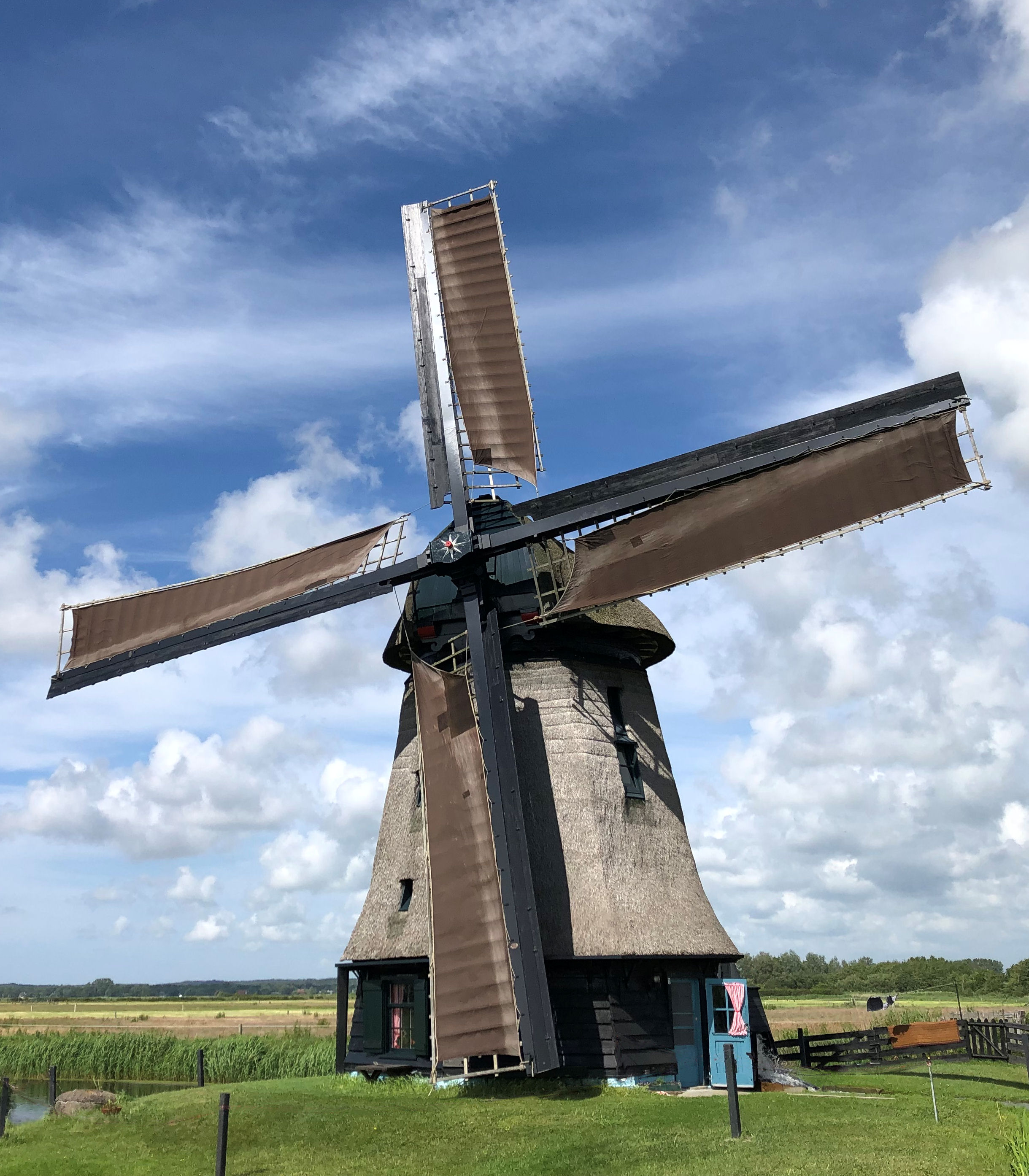
- Windmill De Wimmenumermolen

- Location in the Netherlands Location in the province of North Holland in the Netherlands
- Coordinates: 52°38′21″N 4°39′21″E
- Country: Netherlands
- Province: North Holland
- Municipality: Bergen

Area
  - Total: 3.33 km^{2} (1.29 sq mi)
- Elevation: 3.6 m (12 ft)

Population (2025)
  - Total: 160
  - Density: 48/km^{2} (120/sq mi)
- Time zone: UTC+1 (CET)
  - Summer (DST): UTC+2 (CEST)
- Postal code: 1934
- Dialing code: 072

Wimmenum is a hamlet in the Dutch province of North Holland. It is located in the municipality of Bergen, about 2 km north of Egmond aan den Hoef.

It was first mentioned in the late-11th century as Wymnam. The etymology is unknown.

Wimmenum was a separate municipality from 1817 to 1857, when it was merged with Egmond-Binnen. It was home to 84 people in 1840.

The windmill De Wimmenumermolen is a polder mill which was built in 1774. It was in service until 1951 when a pumping station was constructed. In 1967, it was restored and has an auxiliary function. In 2020, the wind mill broke its record with 1,113,518 revolutions.
