= Rogener Pavinski =

Brazilian musician (born 1981)

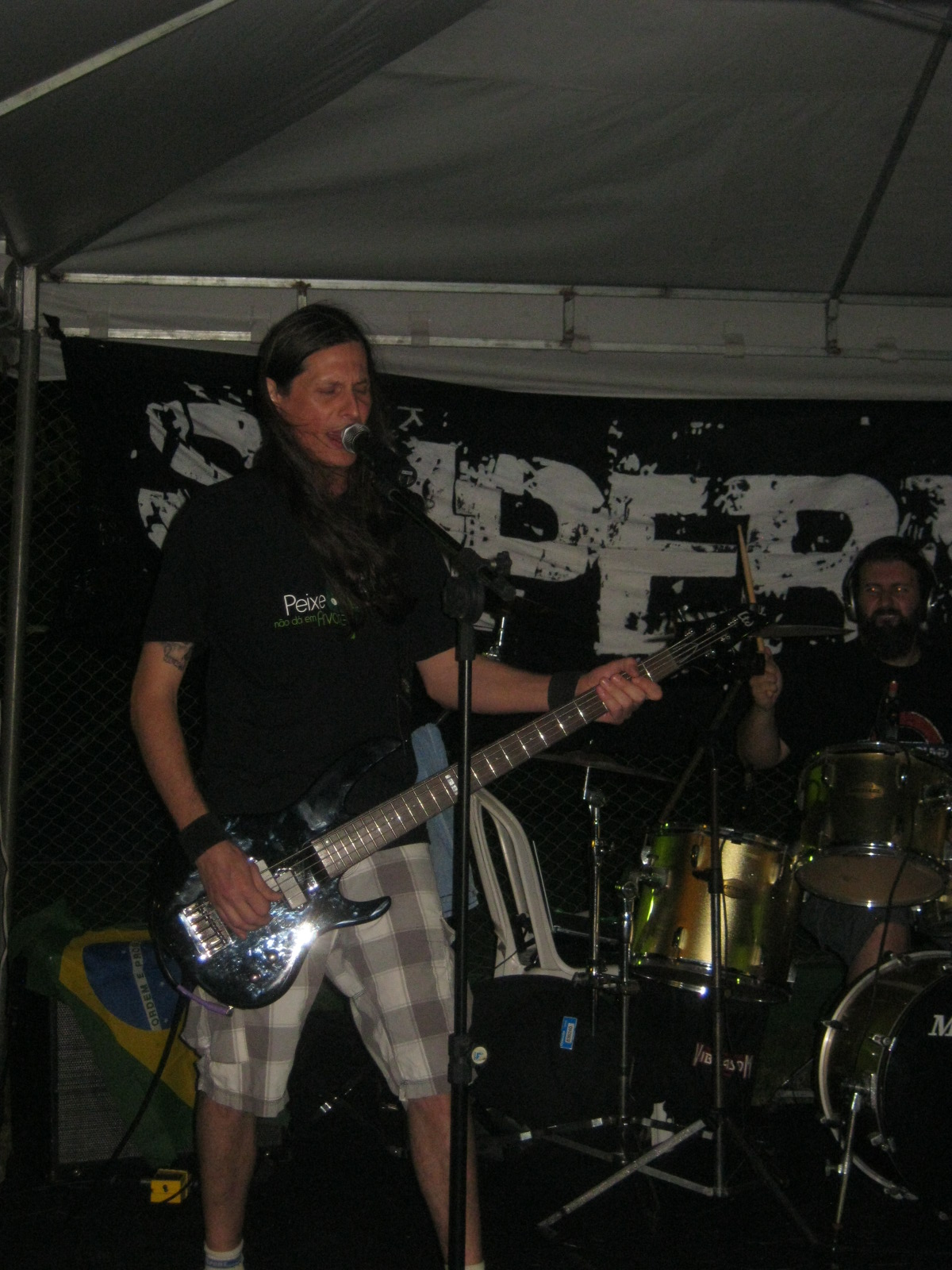
Rogener performing with Supernova

Rogener Pavinski (born 1981 in Ribeirão Preto) is a Brazilian Esperantist, singer and bass guitar player in the Esperanto rock band Supernova, which has performed at Esperanto world congresses and youth events. (Note: For example, the group performed at the International Youth Congress in Liberec, Czech Republic, the World Congress of Esperanto in Białystok, Poland, and at the FESTO youth meeting in Zwingenberg, Germany.) He is also director and producer of the film Esperanto is... (in Esperanto "Esperanto estas...").

He is a former board member (2007–2009) of World Esperanto Youth Organization. In September 2010 he was elected as new editor of the magazine Kontakto, effective with the 2010-05 issue.
