= Bergen, North Holland =

Bergen
- Municipality
- Egmond aan Zee town centre

- Flag Coat of arms

- Location in North Holland
- Coordinates: 52°40′N 4°43′E
- Country: Netherlands
- Province: North Holland

Government
  - Body: Municipal council
  - Mayor: Jaap Bond, (acting) (CDA)

Area
  - Total: 120.23 km^{2} (46.42 sq mi)
  - Land: 98.96 km^{2} (38.21 sq mi)
  - Water: 21.27 km^{2} (8.21 sq mi)
- Elevation: 1 m (3.3 ft)

Population (January 2021)
  - Total: 29,715
  - Density: 300/km^{2} (780/sq mi)
- Demonym: Bergenaar
- Time zone: UTC+1 (CET)
  - Summer (DST): UTC+2 (CEST)
- Postcode: 1860–1873, 1930–1935
- Area code: 072
- Website: www.bergen-nh.nl

Bergen (Dutch pronunciation: [ˈbɛrɣə(n)]) is a municipality and town in the Netherlands, in the province of North Holland. Its North Sea beaches and forests make it a popular destination for tourists. In 2001, the municipality was formed from a merger of the former municipalities of Egmond, Schoorl, and the smaller community of Bergen proper that had existed since 1811.

Since about 1900, Bergen has been the home of many painters, writers and architects. Some of the work of this "Bergen School" is on exhibit at Museum Kranenburgh. The neighbourhood of Park Meerwijk, constructed in 1915, is made up entirely of villas in Amsterdam School style. There are regular art fairs in Bergen, as well as an annual music festival (the Holland Music Sessions in August) and arts festival (the Kunsttiendaagse in October).

North of the town of Bergen are the Schoorlse Duinen, a nature area with the highest and widest dunes of the Netherlands, which reach about 59m (195 ft) above sea level, and are more than 5 km (3.1 mi) wide in some places.

Other points of interest in the municipality include the aquarium in the seaside village of Bergen aan Zee and the historical museums Het Sterkenhuis (Bergen) and Museum van Egmond (Egmond aan Zee).

The town of Bergen has been home to the European School, Bergen, since 1963. In July 2021, the decision was made to move the school to Alkmaar.

== Population centres ==
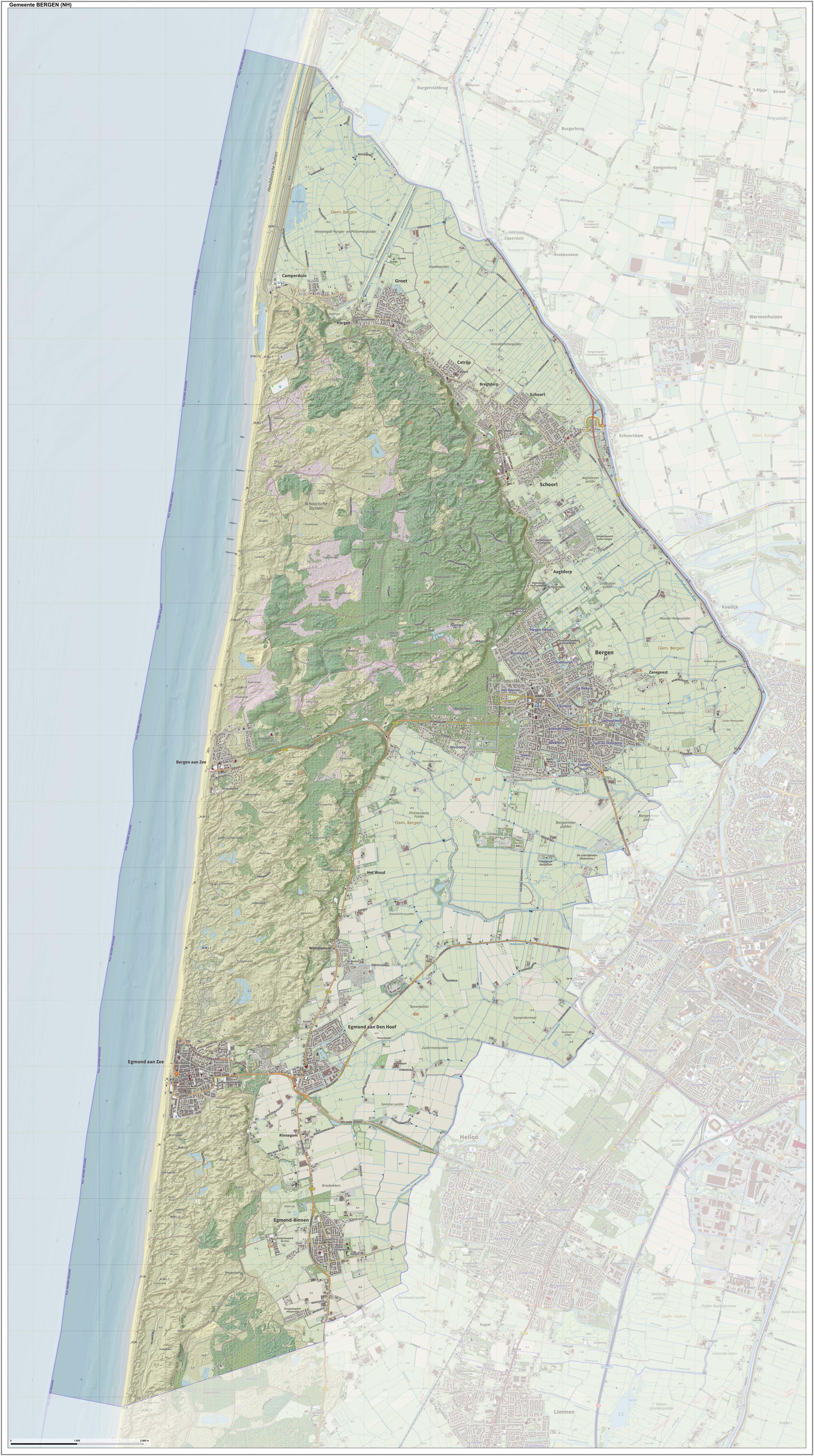
Map of Bergen, June 2015

The municipality of Bergen consists of the following towns, villages and/or districts: Bergen, Aagtdorp, Bergen aan Zee, Bregtdorp, Camperduin, Catrijp, Egmond aan den Hoef, Egmond aan Zee, Egmond-Binnen, Groet, Hargen, Rinnegom, Schoorl, Schoorldam (partly), Wimmenum.

== History ==
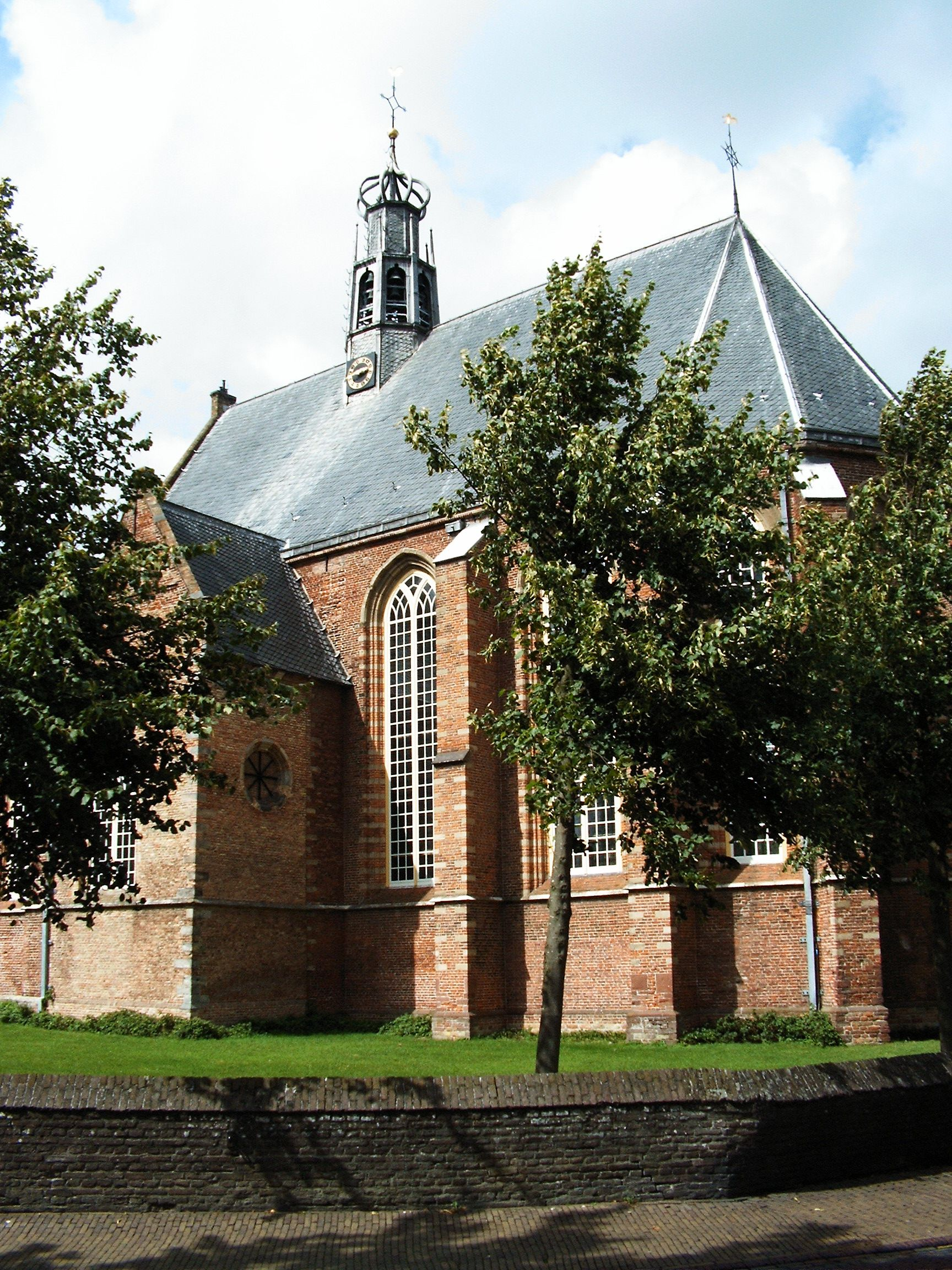
The Ruinekerk church

The Egmond Abbey, founded in the 10th century, became the most important cultural center of medieval Holland. The abbey was protected by the House of Egmond, which eventually became a powerful noble family. The three towns of Egmond have also been mentioned since the 10th century. Both the Egmond Abbey and Egmond Castle in Egmond aan den Hoef were destroyed in 1573 on order of William the Silent during the Dutch Revolt.

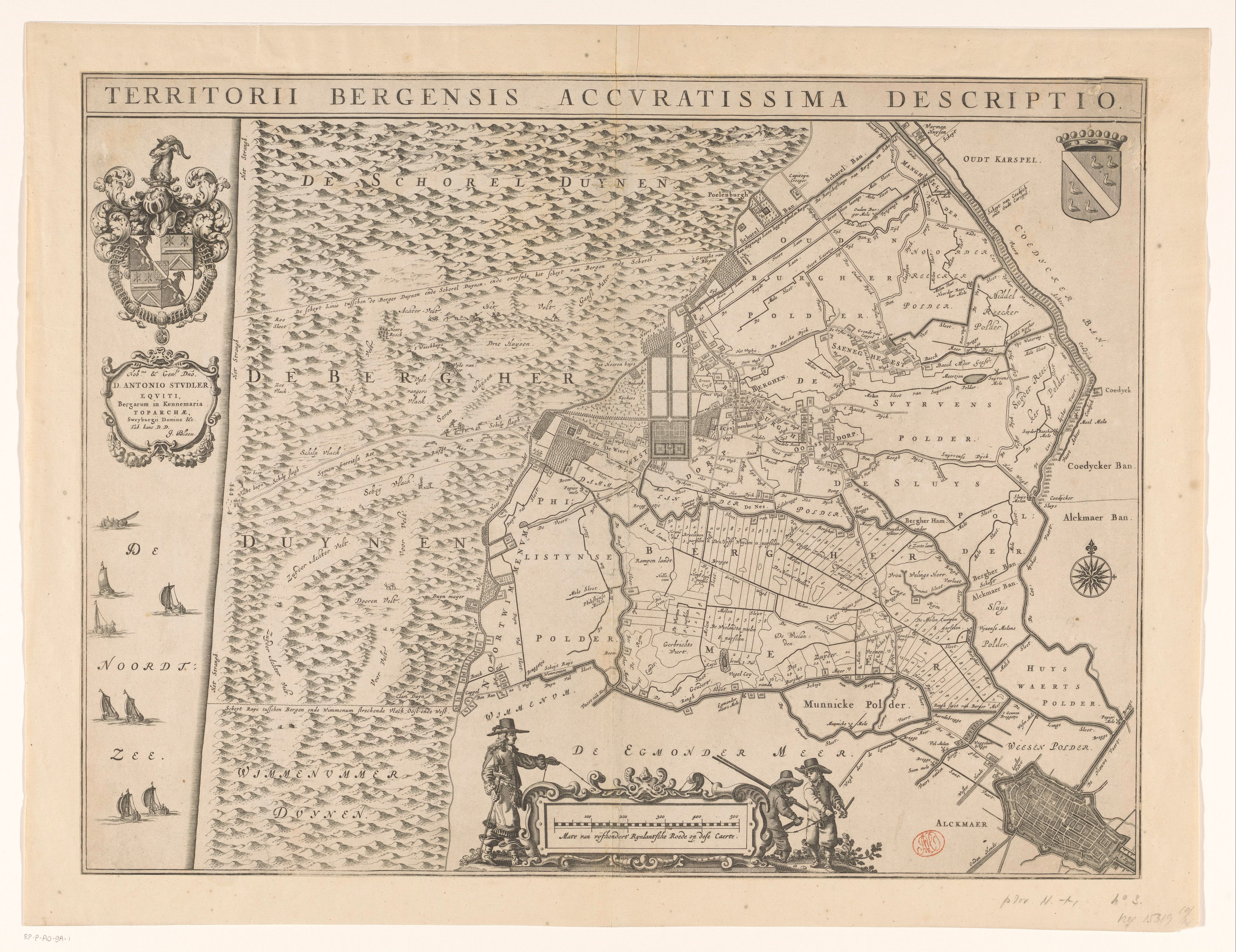
Map of Bergen. mid 1600s

The town of Bergen developed around a chapel and is mentioned as far back as the tenth century. An old local legend is the "Miracle of Bergen", which is said to have occurred during the St. Elisabeth's Flood of 1421. The story goes that the schout (sheriff) of Bergen found a chest containing hosts (the thin wafers used in Holy Communion) from the church of Petten which had floated to Bergen during the flood. The seawater that penetrated the chest had turned into blood. There is also a second miracle story, thought to have occurred in 1422, whereby hosts turned into blood. On the site where the miracle of Bergen is said to have happened, a chapel was erected. Bergen became a place of pilgrimage, and Roman-Catholic processions were held at the site for centuries and continue today.

In the fifteenth century, the Ruïnekerk ("Ruined Church") was built on the site of the chapel and at the time was the largest of its kind in the province of North Holland. In 1574, during the Eighty Years War against Spain, the church was looted and burned down by Dutch Protestants, but was later rebuilt to its current state.

In 1797, the Battle of Camperdown, a major naval action between the British and Batavian (Dutch) fleets, was fought off the coast of Camperduin, part of the municipality of Bergen. It was the most significant action between British and Dutch forces during the French Revolutionary Wars and resulted in a complete victory for the British, who captured 11 Dutch ships without losing any of their own. And in 1799, a British-Russian army invaded North-Holland. At Bergen, a battle with the French-Batavian armies took place on 19 September. The Russisch Monument in Bergen commemorates this Battle of Bergen.

Bergen was one of the main stations on the narrow-gauge railway between Alkmaar and Bergen aan Zee, which ran between 1905 and 1955. One of the locomotives which operated on this line, 'Bello' stood for many years in the town centre as a memorial, and is now preserved at the Museumstoomtram Hoorn - Medemblik.

== Local government ==
Since the 2026 election the municipal council of Bergen has been divided as follows:

- ONS DORP – 7 seats
- KIES Lokaal – 4 seats
- GroenLinks / PvdA – 4 seats
- VVD – 2 seats
- CDA – 2 seats
- D66 – 2 seats

== Notable people ==
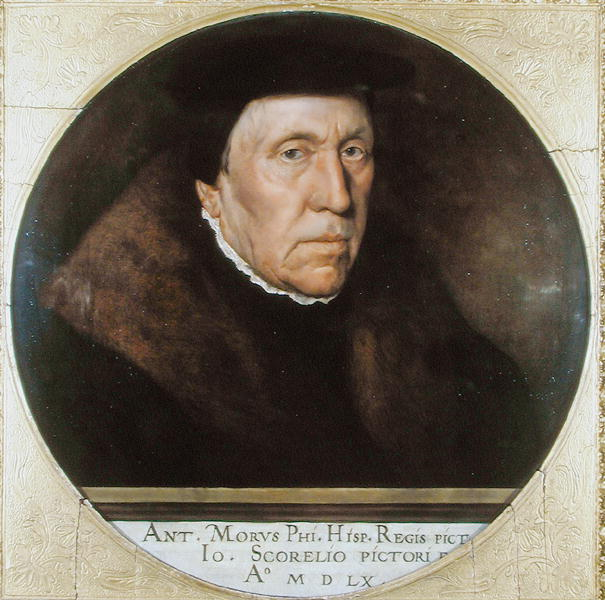
Jan van Scorel, 1560

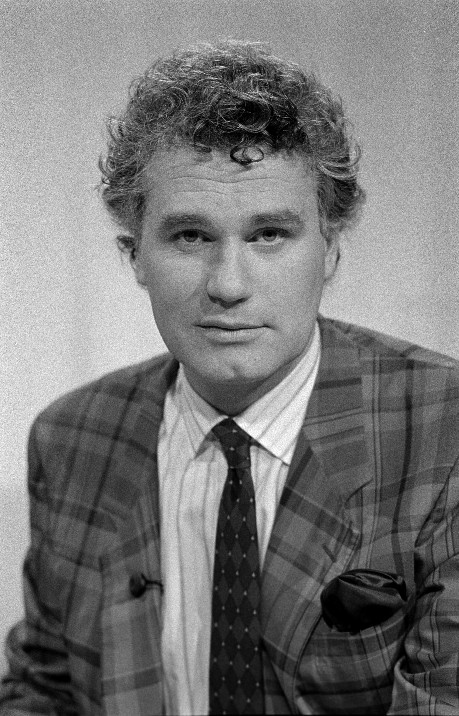
Adriaan van Dis, 1983

- Saint Adalbert of Egmond (died ca. 710 in Egmond), Northumbrian Anglo-Saxon missionary
- Egmond family (1310 – 1574), one of the principal noble families of the County of Holland
- Arnold, Duke of Guelders (1410 in Egmond-Binnen – 1473), Duke of Guelders and Count of Zutphen
- Jan van Scorel (1495 in Schoorl – 1562), painter
- Pierre Gole (1620 in Bergen – 1684), cabinetmaker and designer
- Adriaan Roland Holst (1888 – 1976 in Bergen), writer and poet, lived in Bergen from 1918
- Charley Toorop (1891 – 1955 in Bergen), painter and lithographer, lived in Bergen from 1932
- Edgar Fernhout (1912 in Bergen – 1974), painter
- Simeon ten Holt (1923 in Bergen – 2012), contemporary classical composer
- Saskia Weishut-Snapper (born 1938), fiber artist, grew up in Bergen
- Elly de Waard (born 1940 in Bergen), poet and music reviewer
- Adriaan van Dis (born 1946 in Bergen aan Zee), author
- Thé Lau (1952 in Bergen – 2015), musician and writer
- Saskia Noort (born 1967 in Bergen), crime-writer and freelance journalist
- Jan Roos (born 1977 in Bergen), journalist and politician
- Jim Bakkum (born 1987 in Egmond-Binnen), singer, actor, and TV personality
- Maan de Steenwinkel (born 1997 in Bergen), singer, winner of The Voice of Holland

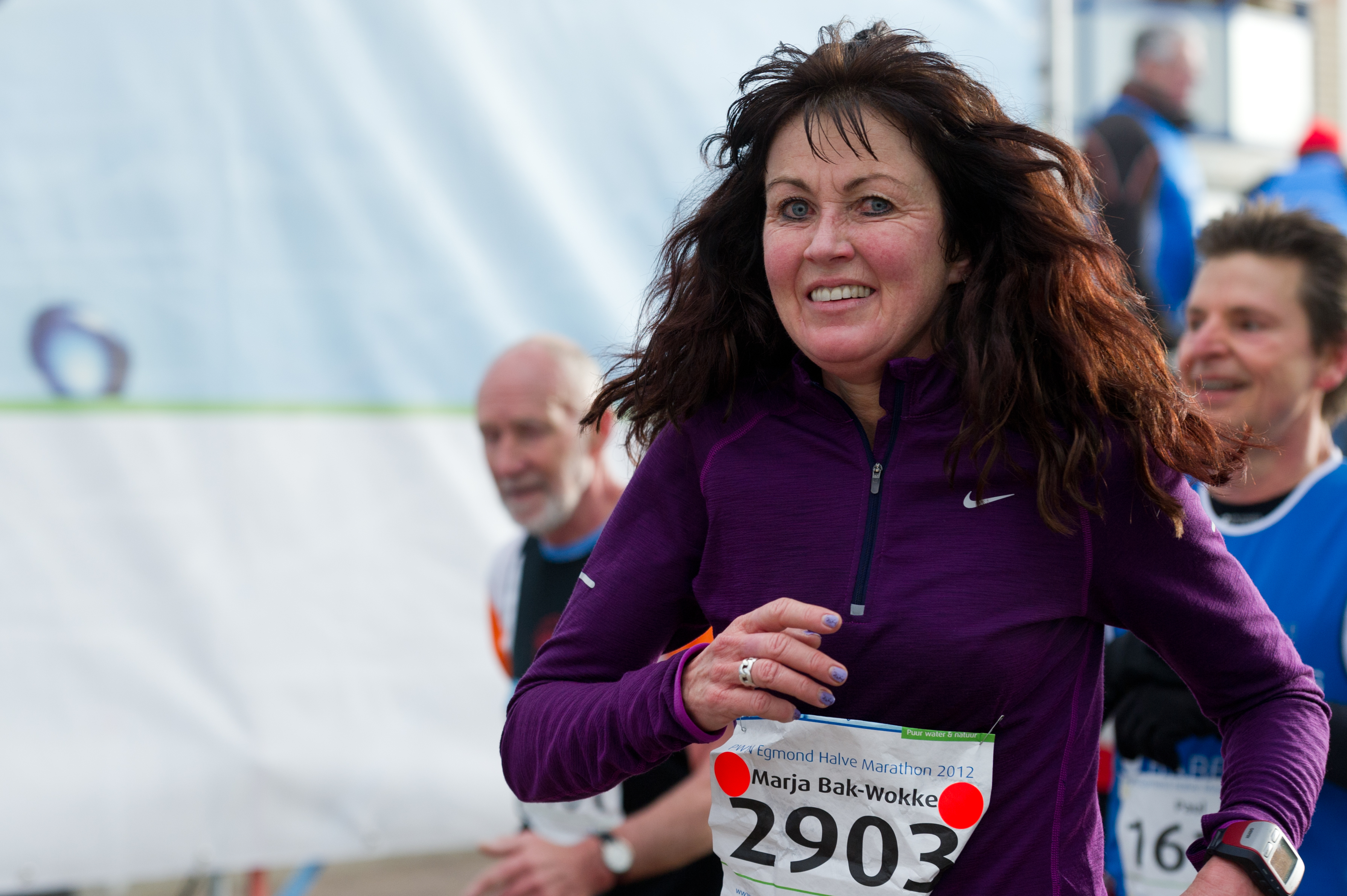
Marja Wokke, 2012

=== Sport ===
- Gerard du Prie (1937 in Egmond aan Zee – 2020), strongman and powerlifter
- Marja Wokke (born 1957 in Bergen), former marathon runner
- Kees van Wonderen (born 1969 in Bergen), retired footballer with 358 club caps
- Teun de Nooijer (born 1976 in Egmond aan den Hoef), field hockey play and multiple Olympic team medalist
- Martina Wegman (born 1989 in Schoorl), slalom canoeist

== Gallery ==
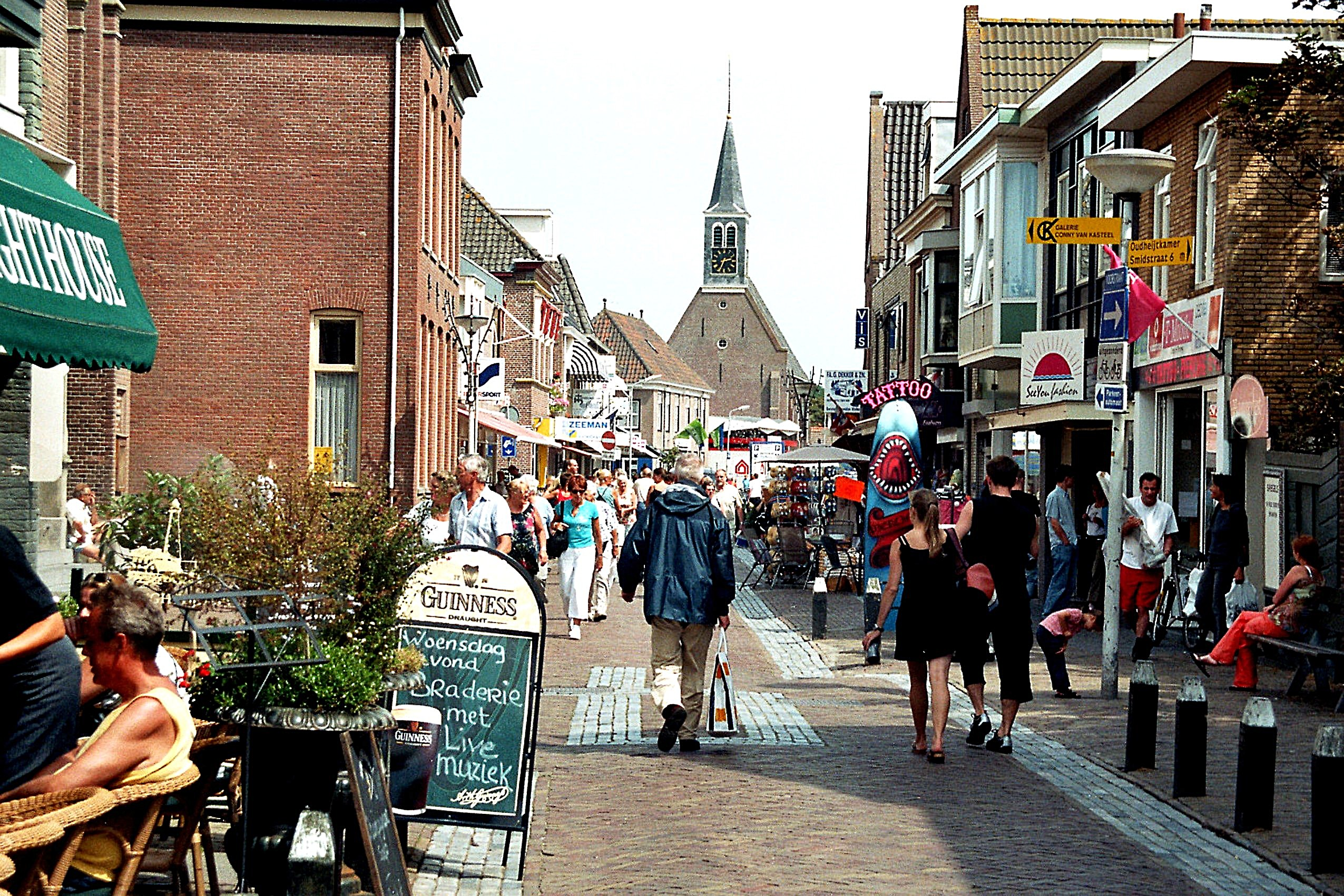
Egmond aan Zee, the Voorstraat, view to the Nederlands Hervormde Kerk

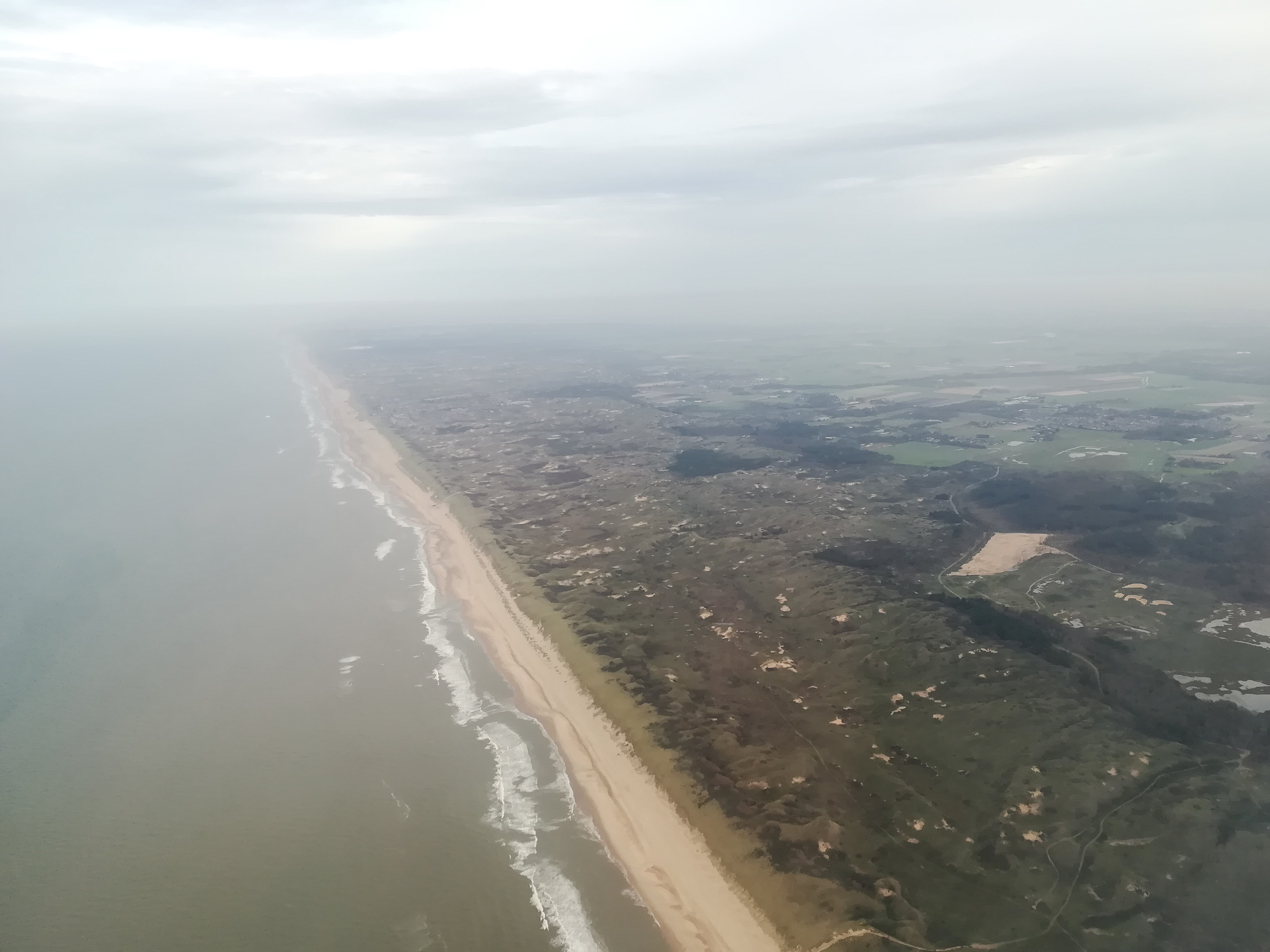
Egmond-Binnen

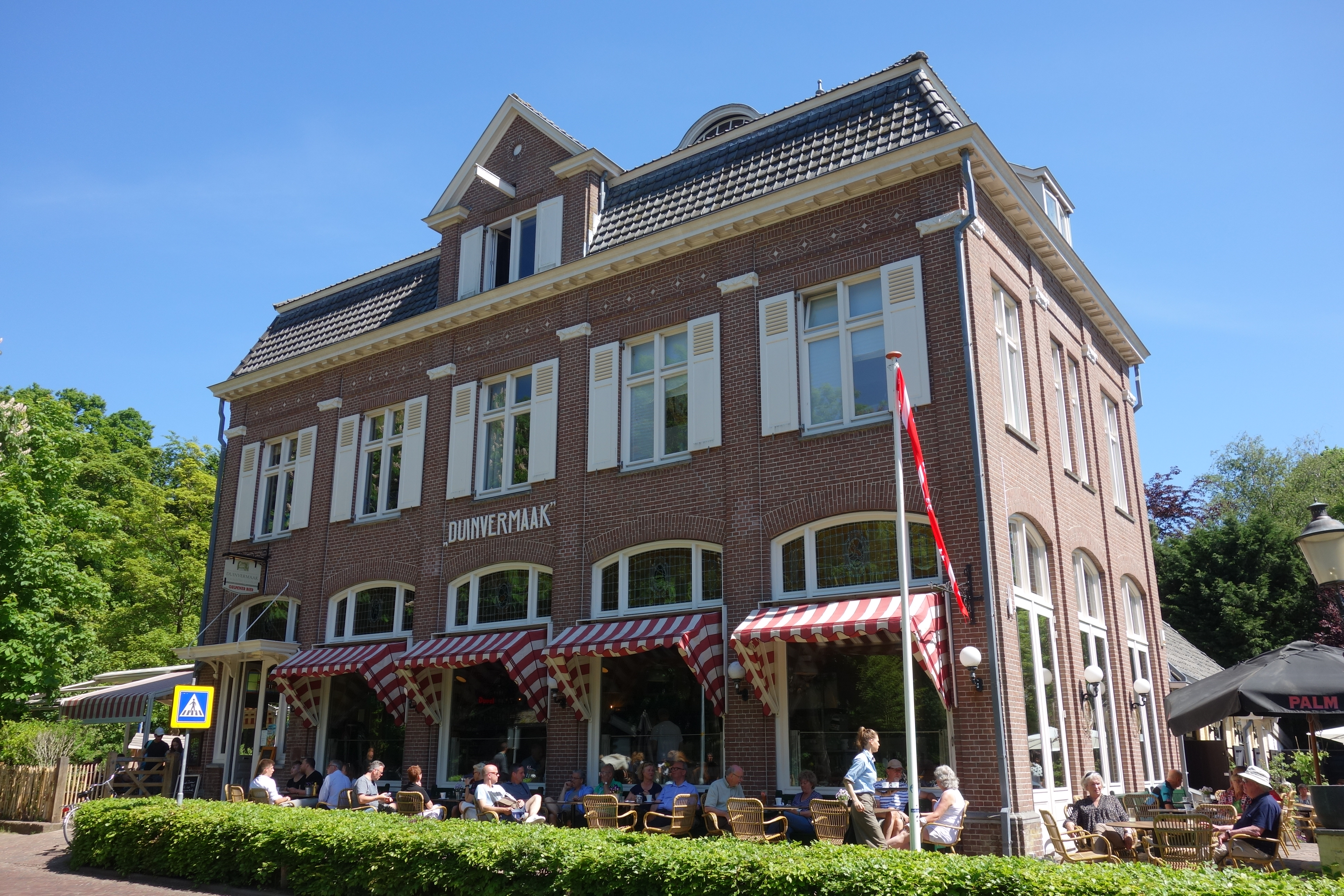
Breelaan 132, Bergen

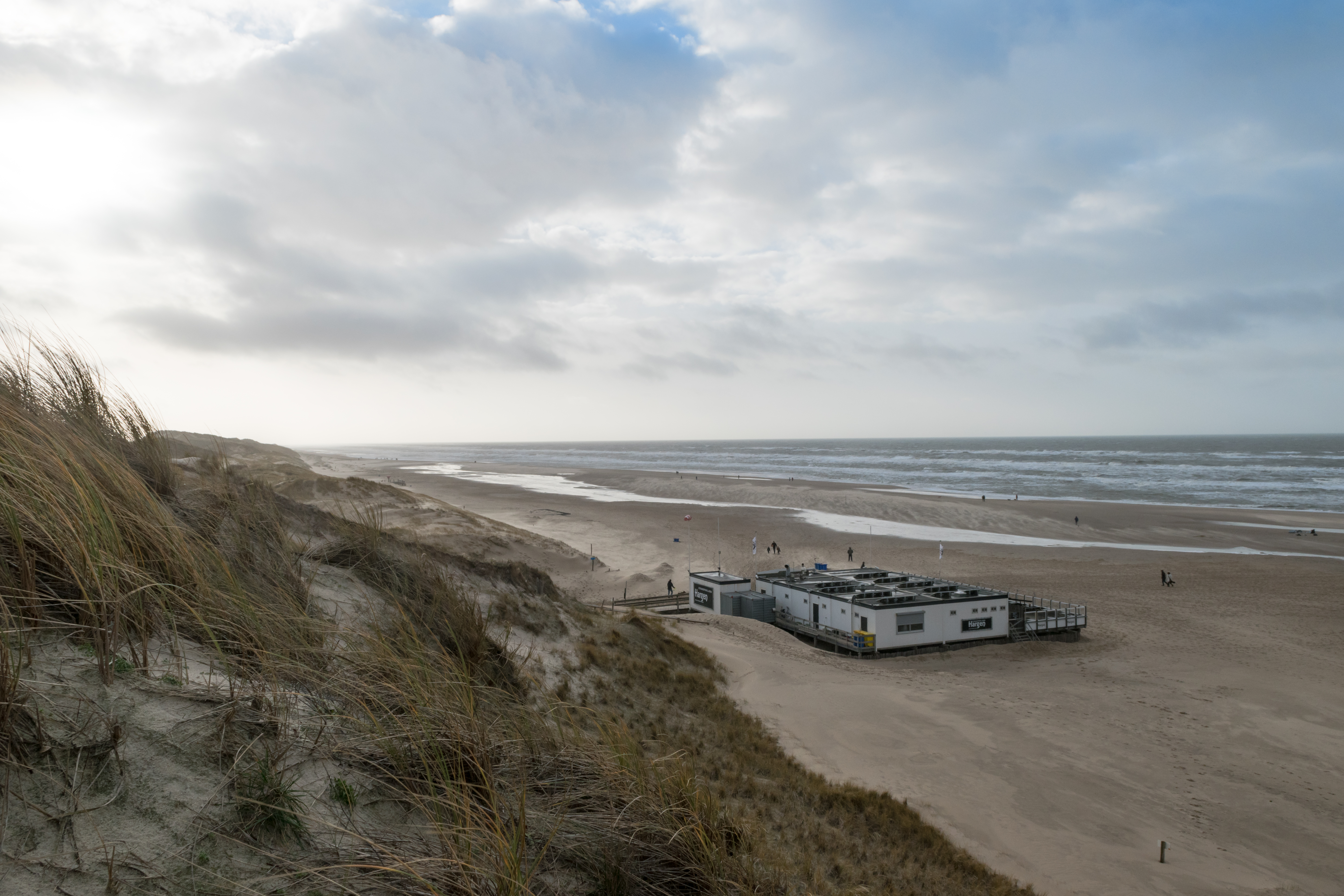
The beach of Hargen aan Zee
