= International Youth Congress =

Annual meeting of young Esperantists

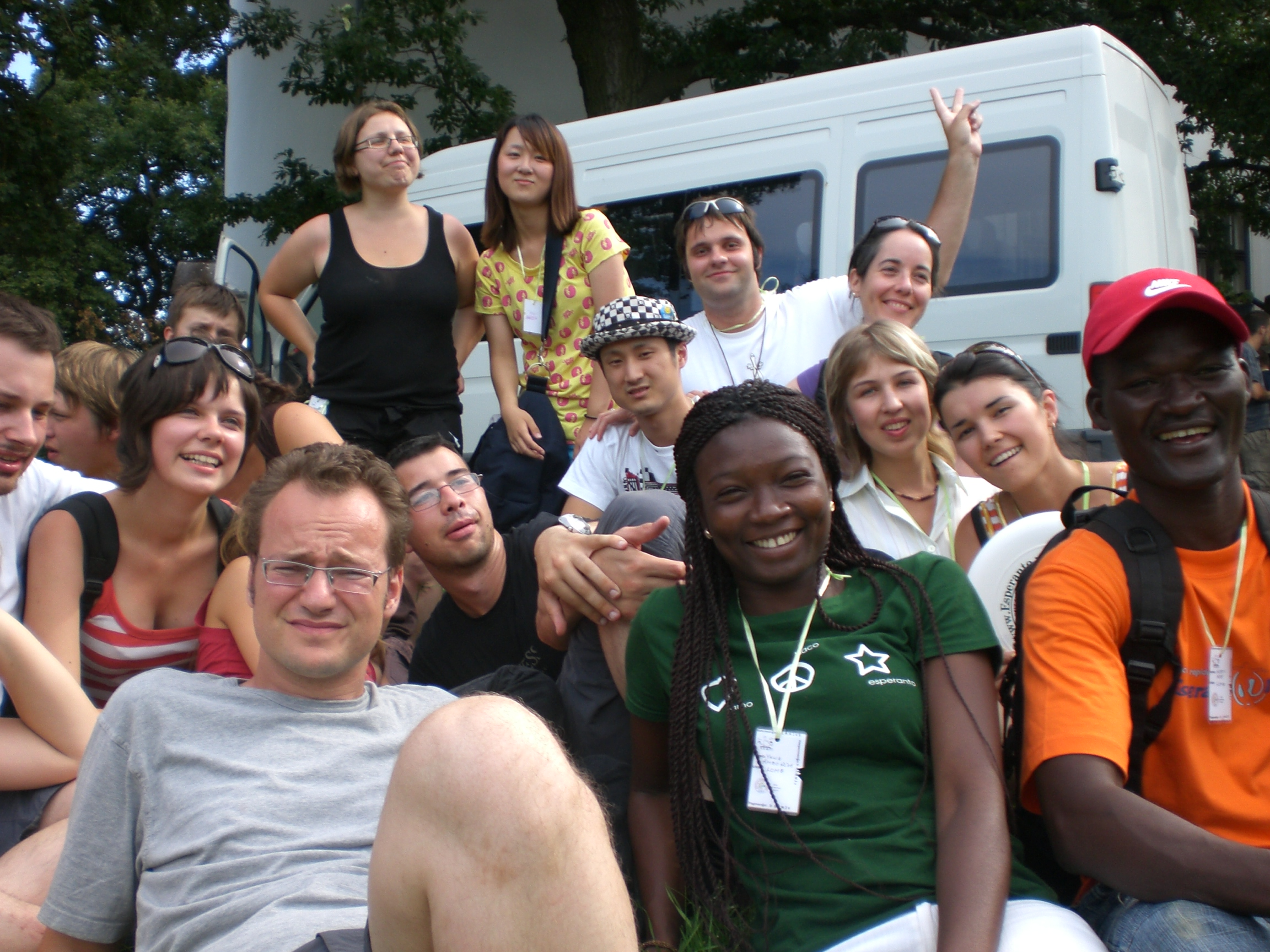
IJK 2008 in Szombathely, Hungary

The International Youth Congress (Esperanto: Internacia Junulara Kongreso, IJK) is the largest annual meeting of young Esperantists in the world. The participants come from all over the world for one week, and they usually number around 300, although there has been a congress with more than 1000 attendees before. The congress takes place in a different country every year and is organized by the World Esperanto Youth Organization (Esperanto: Tutmonda Esperantista Junulara Organizo, TEJO), the youth wing of the Universal Esperanto Association (Esperanto: Universala Esperanto-Asocio, UEA). Both the IJK and the World Esperanto Congress take place each summer, usually in consecutive weeks but rarely in the same country.

== List of congresses ==
Map of countries that have hosted the International Youth Congress of Esperanto, 1938–2018.

Number	Year	City	Country	Number of registrees (both attenders and non-attenders)	Number of participants
82	2026	Tiana	Catalonia		
81	2025	Cisarua	Indonesia	181	140
80	2024	Šventoji	Lithuania	213	188
79	2023	Lignano Sabbiadoro	Italy	227	238
78	2022	Westelbeers	Netherlands		
77	2021	Online event because of the coronavirus pandemic			
76	2020	Online event because of the coronavirus pandemic			
75	2019	Liptovský Hrádok	Slovakia	291	231
74	2018	Badajoz	Spain	306	273
73	2017	Aného	Togo	136	110
72	2016	Wrocław	Poland	264	
71	2015	Wiesbaden	Germany	291	
70	2014	Fortaleza	Brazil	156	150
69	2013	Nazareth	Israel	98	80
68	2012	Hanoi	Vietnam	142	145
67	2011	Kyiv	Ukraine	320	311
66	2010	Santa Cruz del Norte	Cuba	~133	181
65	2009	Liberec	Czech Republic	472	343
64	2008	Szombathely	Hungary	485	365
63	2007	Hanoi	Vietnam	175+	145
62	2006	Sarajevo	Bosnia and Herzegovina	379	
61	2005	Zakopane	Poland	478	
60	2004	Kovrov	Russia	385	355
59	2003	Lesjöfors	Sweden	330	
58	2002	Pato Branco	Brazil	100	
57	2001	Strasbourg	France		406
56	2000	Hong Kong	China		200
55	1999	Veszprém	Hungary	500	
54	1998	Rijeka	Croatia	378	
53	1997	Assisi	Italy	470	
52	1996	Güntersberge	Germany	360	
51	1995	Serovo, near Saint Petersburg	Russia	350+	303
50	1994	Cheonan	South Korea	241	
49	1993	Vratsa	Bulgaria	173	
48	1992	Montreal	Canada	104	
47	1991	Karlskoga	Sweden	189	
46	1990	Playa Giron	Cuba	153	
45	1989	Kerkrade	Netherlands	525	
44	1988	Zagreb	Yugoslavia	769	
43	1987	Kraków	Poland	1034	
42	1986	Neurim (נעורים)	Israel	106	
41	1985	Eringerfeld	West Germany	425	
40	1984	Swanwick	United Kingdom	293	
39	1983	Debrecen	Hungary	672	
38	1982	Leuven	Belgium	315	
37	1981	Oaxtepec	Mexico	108	
36	1980	Rauma	Finland	332	
35	1979	Austerlitz	Netherlands	388	
34	1978	Veliko Tarnovo	Bulgaria	450	
33	1977	Poitiers	France	325	
32	1976	Thessaloniki	Greece	350	
31	1975	Fredericia	Denmark	265	
30	1974	Münster	West Germany	250	
29	1973	Sarajevo	Yugoslavia	282	
28	1972	Toruń	Poland	250	
27	1971	Edinburgh	United Kingdom	150	
26	1970	Graz	Austria	200	
25	1969	Tyresö	Sweden	120	
24	1968	Tarragona	Spain	130	
23	1967	Rotterdam	Netherlands	90	
22	1966	Pécs	Hungary	900	
21	1965	Ōtsu	Japan	250	
20	1964	Amsterdam	Netherlands	200	
19	1963	Vratsa	Bulgaria	550	
18	1962	Ystad	Sweden	70	
17	1961	Wokingham	United Kingdom	116	
16	1960	Rotterdam	Netherlands	105	
15	1959	Gdańsk	Poland	300	
14	1958	Hamburg	West Germany	126	
13	1957	Villeneuve-lès-Avignon	France	30	
12	1956	Büsum	West Germany	173	
11	1955	L'Aquila	Italy	350	250
10	1954	Hilversum	Netherlands	90	
9	1953	Wörgl	Austria	80	
8	1952	Ry	Denmark	108	
7	1951	Haarlem	Netherlands	280	
6	1950	Konstanz	West Germany	420	
5	1949	Versailles	France	200	
4	1948	Groet	Netherlands	285	
3	1947	Ipswich	United Kingdom	200	
World War II
2	1939	Tervuren	Belgium	400	350
1	1938	Groet	Netherlands	304+	203

== Statistics ==
=== Countries ===
Countries by number of times as host:

Times hosted	Country	Years hosted
10	Netherlands	1938, 1948, 1951, 1954, 1960, 1964, 1967, 1979, 1989, 2022
7	Germany	1950, 1956, 1958, 1974, 1985, 1996, 2015
5	Poland	1959, 1972, 1987, 2005, 2016
4	United Kingdom	1947, 1961, 1971, 1984
4	France	1949, 1957, 1977, 2001
4	Sweden	1962, 1969, 1991, 2003
4	Hungary	1966, 1983, 1999, 2008
3	Italy	1955, 1997, 2023
3	Bulgaria	1963, 1978, 1993
3	Spain	1968, 2018, 2026
2	Belgium	1939, 1982
2	Denmark	1952, 1975
2	Austria	1953, 1970
2	Yugoslavia	1973, 1988
2	Israel	1986, 2013
2	Cuba	1990, 2010
2	Russia	1995, 2004
2	Brazil	2002, 2014
2	Vietnam	2007, 2012
1	Japan	1965
1	Greece	1976
1	Finland	1980
1	Mexico	1981
1	Canada	1992
1	South Korea	1994
1	Croatia	1998
1	Hong Kong	2000
1	Bosnia and Herzegovina	2006
1	Czech Republic	2009
1	Ukraine	2011
1	Togo	2017
1	Slovakia	2019
1	Lithuania	2024

=== Continents ===
Of the 80 congresses that have happened so far, (Note: This excludes future congresses.) 61 were hosted in Europe, 7 in Asia, 4 in North America, 2 in South America, 1 in Africa and none in Oceania.

=== Cities ===
Five cities have hosted the event twice:

- (Netherlands) Groet (1938, 1948)
- (Netherlands) Rotterdam (1960, 1967)
- (Bulgaria) Vraca (1963, 1993)
- (Socialist Federal Republic of Yugoslavia) (Bosnia and Herzegovina) Sarajevo (1972, 2006)
- (Vietnam) Hanoi (2007, 2012)

== See also ==
- Internacia Junulara Festivalo
