= Internacia Junulara Festivalo =

The Internacia Junulara Festivalo (IJF; English: International Youth Festival) is a traditional one-week-long meeting of Esperantists organised yearly by the Italian Esperanto Youth at Easter, each time in a different Italian town. Each festival has its own theme, to be developed in lectures and discussion groups; additionally, lectures of general interest are usually proposed, as well as tourist visits to neighbouring cities, concerts and performances. One can usually improve his/her knowledge of the Esperanto language thanks to language courses at beginner and intermediate level.

The first IJF was held in 1977. The meeting is usually attended by about 100 participants; the most popular one was the 24th IJF, held in 2000, which was attended by 325 participants.

== Chronology ==
Edition	Year	Place	Participants
47	2024	Serrada di Folgaria	58
46	2023	Palmi	40
45	2022	Forni Avoltri	85
44	2020	Turin	31 registered; the festival was cancelled due to COVID-19
43	2019	Rimini	45
42	2018	Marina di Ascea	67
41	2017	Castione della Presolana	99
40	2016	Pesaro	81
39	2015	Brusson	85
38	2014	Castel Sardo	140
37	2013	Ostuni	61
36	2012	Cervia	111
35	2011	Col di Nava	75
34	2010	Roncegno	69
33	2009	Giulianova	92 registered; the festival was cancelled due to an earthquake
32	2008	Senigallia	130
31	2007	Lignano Sabbiadoro	124
30	2006	Torricella di Magione	51
29	2005	Jesolo	94
28	2004	Abetone	68
27	2003	Savona	124
26	2002	Fenestrelle	155
25	2001	Bolsena	165
24	2000	Cavallino	325
23	1999	Bellaria	150
22	1998	Lignano Sabbiadoro	205
21	1997	Col di Nava	90
20	1996	Sant'Orsola Terme	170
19	1995	Marina di Massa	201
18	1994	Fenestrelle	180
17	1993	Vasto	148
16	1992	Pont de La Salle	144
15	1991	Pinarella di Cervia	126
14	1990	Breguzzo	130
13	1989	Savona	100
12	1988	Castiglione dei Pepoli	103
11	1987	Venaria Reale	167
10	1986	Castelfranco Veneto	166
9	1985	Venaria Reale	153
8	1984	San Giuliano Mare di Rimini	100
7	1983	Domaso	100
6	1982	Trieste	100
5	1981	Porretta Terme	120
4	1980	Gorizia	110
3	1979	Marina di Massa	73
2	1978	Jesolo Lido	76
1	1977	Levico Terme	51

== Other Esperanto meetings ==
- Internacia Junulara Kongreso
- Internacia Junulara Semajno
- Internacia Seminario
- Ago-Semajno
- Internacia Festivalo
