= Pierre Gole =

Parisian ébéniste (cabinet maker)

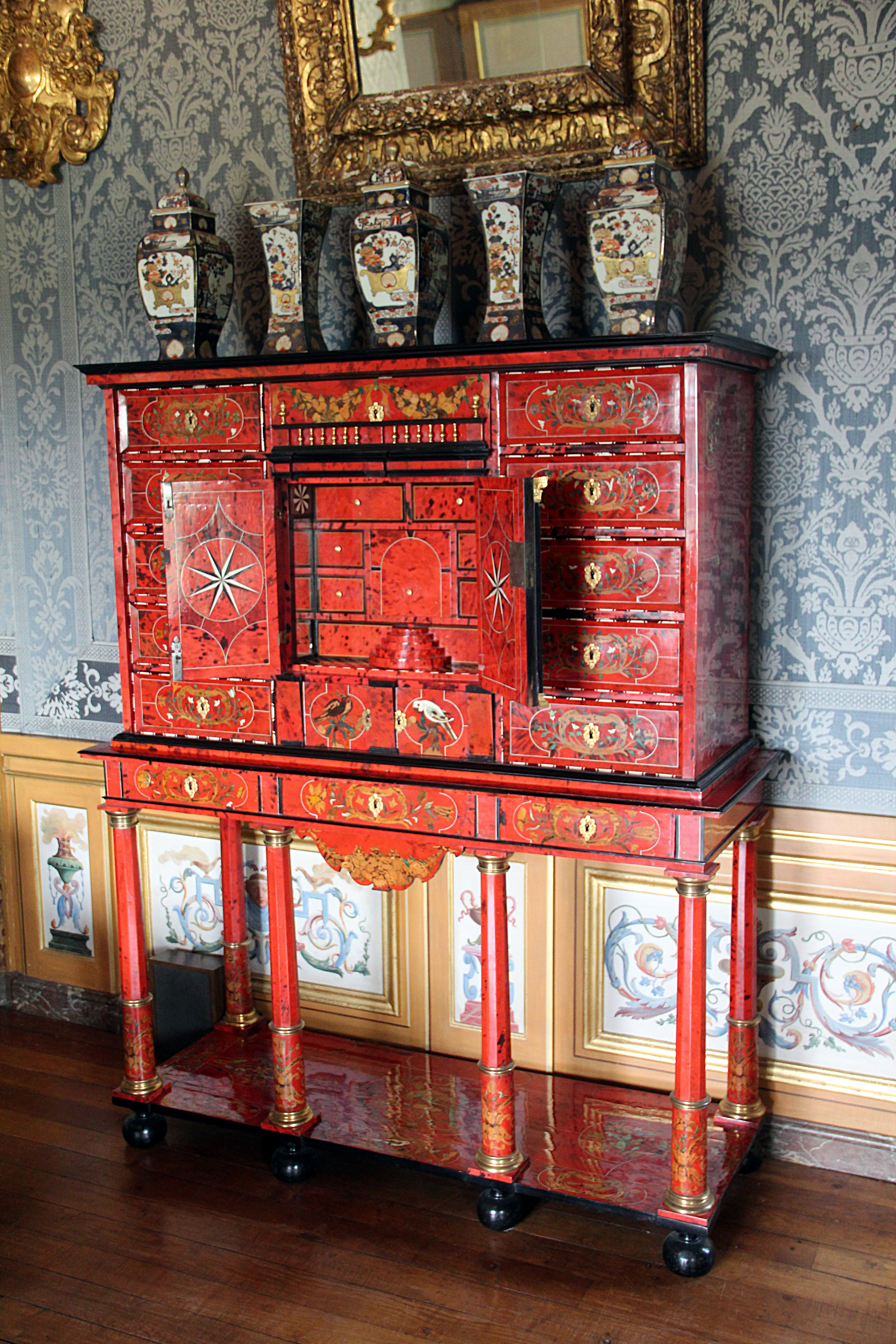
Cabinet, made of red tortoiseshell veneer, 17th century.

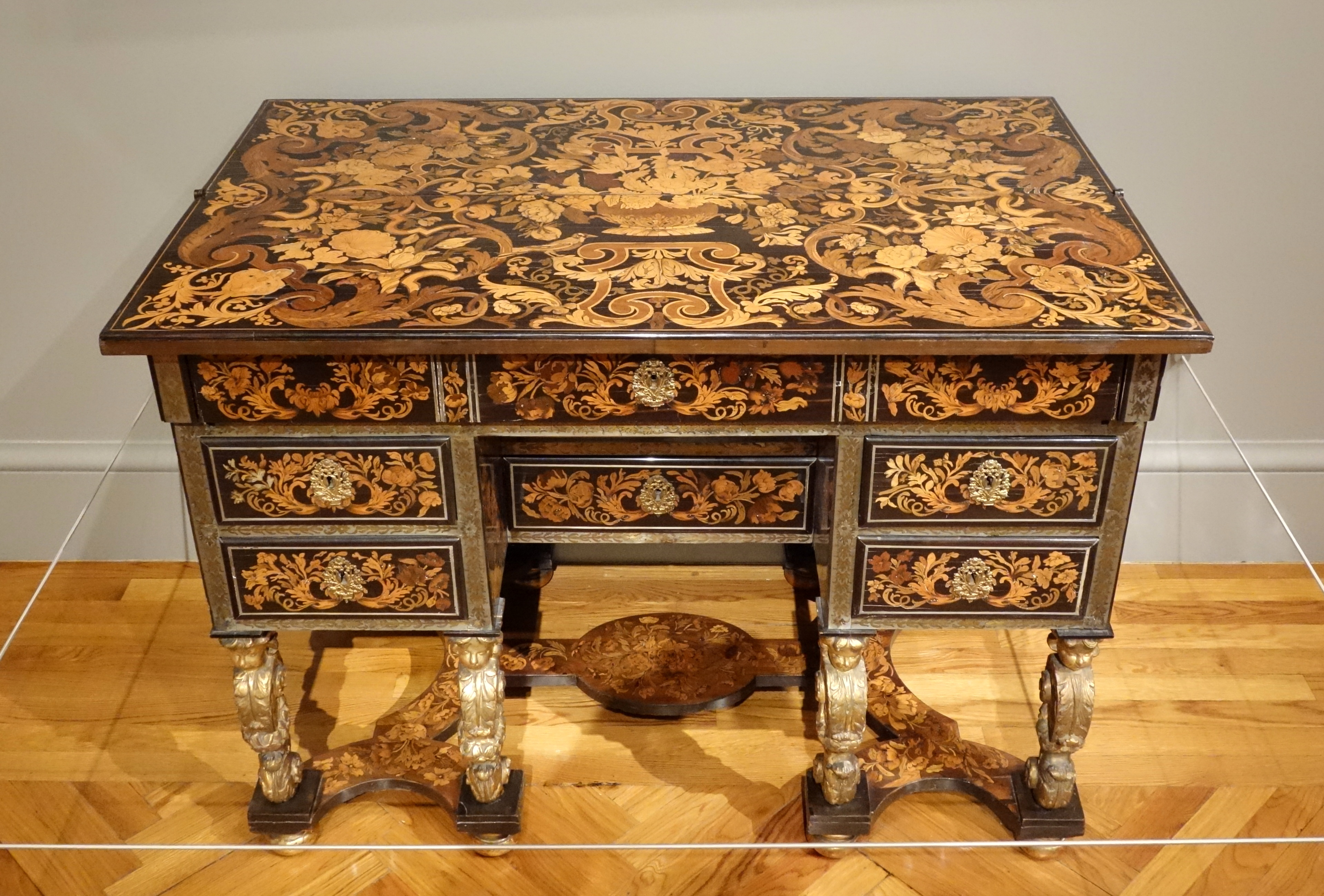
Writing desk, made of ebony, rosewood, fruitwoods, gilt wood, pewter, and brass, c. 1680

Pierre Gole (ca 1620, Bergen, North Holland – 27 November 1684) was an influential Parisian ébéniste (cabinet maker) of Dutch extraction.

Born at Bergen in the Dutch Republic, he moved to Paris at an early age. In 1645 he married Anne Garbran, the daughter of his master Adrian Garbran, assuming most of the responsibility for the workshop for her mother after her father's death in 1650. Golle was the originator of marquetry of tortoiseshell and brass, named for André-Charles Boulle, as "Boulle marquetry". The Boulle dynasty of royal and Parisian cabinet-makers endured to the mid-18th century.

Golle had been employed by Cardinal Mazarin before he was taken under royal protection; from 1656 onwards, Golle is described in documents as maître menuisier en ébène ordinaire du roi ("master ebony furniture maker-in-ordinary to the King"). By 1681 he had a workshop at the Gobelins Manufactory. From 1662 he supplied marquetry cabinets and numerous other pieces of case furniture for the use of the King and the Grand Dauphin at Versailles and other royal châteaux, the most expensive of which were several cabinets delivered over a span of years at the outstanding sum of 6000 livres apiece. For the marquetry floor of the Cabinet Doré of the Grand Dauphin, he was paid 7500 livres; the dazzling interior was swept away in new redecorations after the Dauphin's death in 1711.

Lunsingh Scheurleer identified as Golle's a table and two guéridons en suite, veneered with pewter and brass marquetry, at Knole House, which were probably diplomatic gifts made by Louis XIV to Lord Sackville, English ambassador. He identified as from Golle's workshop a similarly decorated desk at Boughton. Two tripod tea or coffee tables, in première and contre-partie, one in the Royal Collection, the other in the J. Paul Getty Museum, have been attributed to Golle by Gillian Wilson.

His son, Corneille Golle, emigrated after the Revocation of the Edict of Nantes (1685) and by 1689 was working with the London cabinetmaker Gerrit Jensen, supplying marquetry furniture in the latest Parisian taste to the court of William III and Mary II. There was some direct exchange with Jensen, for at his death Pierre Golle owed 400 livres to "Sieur Janson, ébéniste à Londres", for English glue.

The Huguenot designer Daniel Marot married Catharina Maria Gole daughter of Pierre Gole's brother Adrian. In addition to marrying Pierre Gole's niece, Catharina, Daniel Marot also became Gole's nephew through being the son of Charlotte Garbran who was another sister of Gole's wife Anne, and was thereby his sister-in-law.

Golle died in Paris in 1684.

His name is usually spelled Gole and not Golle (see, for example, "French Furniture Makers" by Pradere)
