= World Esperanto Youth Organization =

Organization for young Esperanto speakers

- Tutmonda Esperantisto Junulara Organizo
- Abbreviation: TEJO
- Named after: World Youth Organization
- Formation: August 14, 1938; 88 years ago
- Founded at: Groet, Netherlands
- Headquarters: Rotterdam, Netherlands
- Official language: Esperanto
- Parent organization: UEA
- Affiliations: YFJ ICMYO
- Website: TEJO.org

The World Esperanto Youth Organization (Esperanto: Tutmonda Esperantista Junulara Organizo, TEJO) is an organization dedicated to supporting young Esperanto speakers around the world and promote the use of Esperanto. TEJO was founded in 1938 as the Tutmonda Junular-Organizo (World Youth Organization) and took its current name in 1952. In 1956, TEJO became the youth section of the Universal Esperanto Association (UEA). In 1971, the finances and administration of TEJO were fully integrated into those of UEA.

== Activities ==
TEJO is an organization for young Esperanto speakers. TEJO has individual members as well as member organizations. There are 42 member organizations, as well as 13 national organizations that TEJO has contact with but that are not members.

TEJO organizes an International Youth Congress (Internacia Junulara Kongreso) each year in a different location around the world. During the IJK there are concerts, presentations, excursions, and recreation, usually one week long and attended by a few hundred young people from several countries.

TEJO also publishes the Pasporta Servo, which is an international hospitality network of Esperanto speakers that accept Esperanto-speaking guests.

TEJO publishes Kontakto, a magazine aimed at beginners and youth.

TEJO organizes several youth seminars each year. These seminars bring together an international group of young people to discuss a current issue. Past seminars have focused on human rights, globalization, language problems on minority languages, intercomprehension and the Internet. The seminars last for one week.

== Timeline ==
- 1920: World Esperantist Youth Association (TEJA) was established (and several years later "fell asleep")
- 1938: During the first International Youth Congress (IJK) in Groet, Netherlands, according to a decision of more than 200 participants from 10 countries the World Youth Organization (TJO) was born.
- 1939: The second IJK took place in Tervuren, Belgium
- 1947: TJO became a special section of the Universal Esperanto Association (UEA)
- 1948: The organization "Native Esperanto speakers" became part of TJO. The third IJK took place in Ipswich, the United Kingdom and it's taken place every year since then.
- 1952: During the 8th IJK in Ry, Denmark, TJO became TEJO (the World Esperanto Youth Organization). In that period TEJO was going through a financial and structural crisis.
- 1956: During the 12th IJK in Büsum, Germany, the committee of TEJO proposed that TEJO become the youth section and an integral part of UEA. A period of internal reorganization started.
- 1960: The reorganization process was concluded during the 16th IJK in Rotterdam, Netherlands. TEJO opened itself to the outside world by starting cooperation with several non-Esperanto YNOs.
- 1963: Kontakto, an international magazine of TEJO, was born. It continues to be published six times a year and is a magazine in Esperanto, but not about Esperanto.
- 1964: PR became the focus of attention. Several brochures and flyers were published in national languages and special group for contacts with other youth organizations was established.
- 1965: The first of a series of seminars was organized in Ljubljana, Yugoslavia (today Slovenia), with the goal of discussing the language problem and exchange experiences with different YNOs. Seminars soon also discussed more practical topics, such as exchange of experiences between generations and other issues of youth work.
- 1966: At the same time as the most successful IJK took place (more than 900 young people participated), TEJO went through a serious financial crisis. TEJO became a correspondent member of the UNESCO's Coordinating Committee for International Voluntary Service. In Argentina the "Programme Passport" was launched, which turned into "Pasporta Servo" (a network of Esperanto speakers around the globe willing to host other Esperanto speakers for a limited time, a forerunner of Couchsurfing) several years later
- 1979: TEJO was accepted by the Geneva Informal Meeting, GIM.
- 1980: TEJO organized its first seminar at the European Youth Centre in Strasbourg (EYC-S).
- 1983: TEJO Tutmonde, another one of TEJO's magazines, related to the organization itself, was launched.
- 2017: The first international youth congress that took place in Africa, in Togo.
- 2020: the first international youth congress that entirely took place in the internet, because of the Coronavirus crisis.

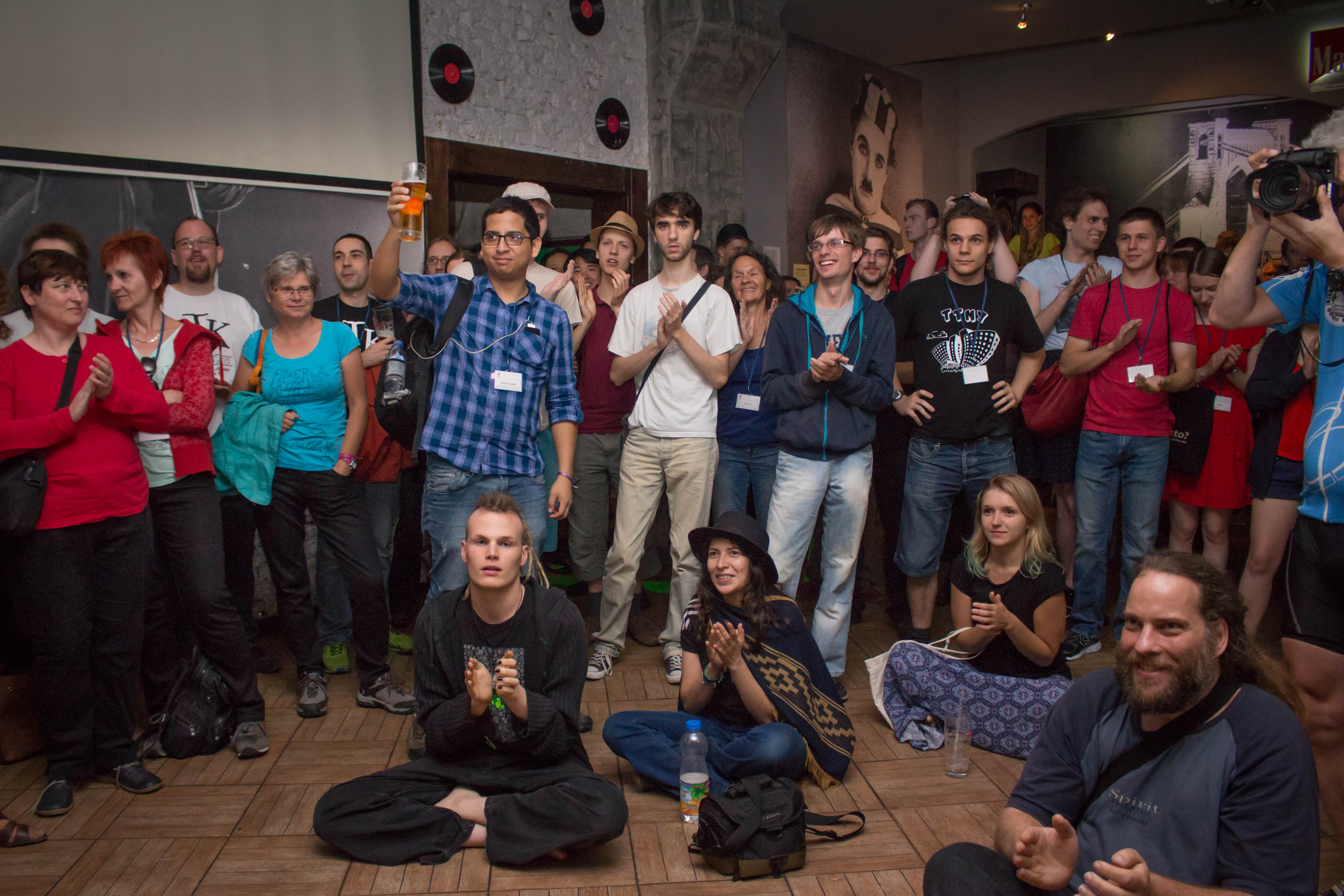
Youth congress in Wrocław 2016
