= Elly de Waard =

Dutch poet (born 1940)

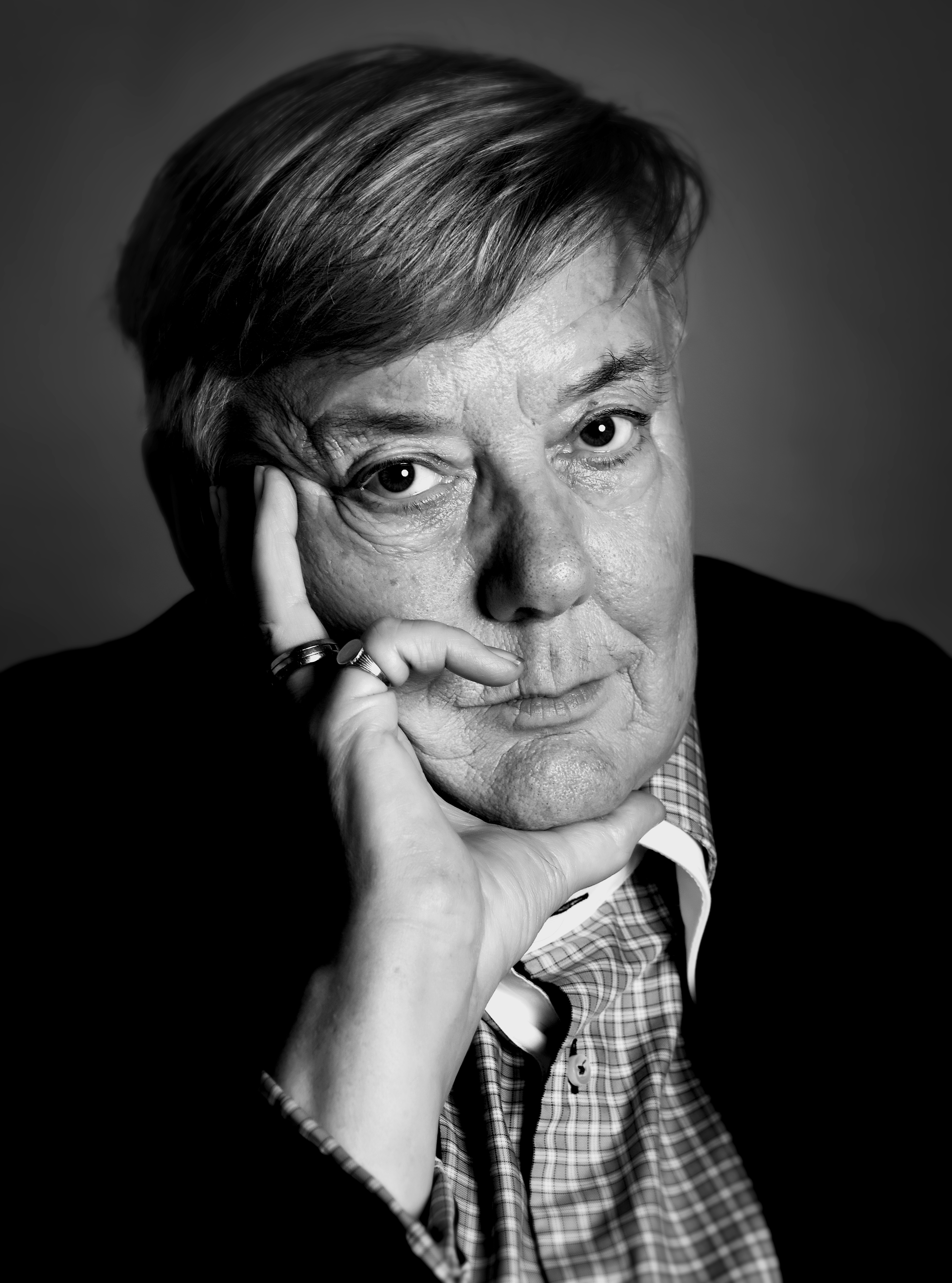
Elly de Waard (photo by Ben Kleyn)

Elly de Waard (born September 8, 1940) is a Dutch poet.

She was born in Bergen and was educated at the Murmellius Gymnasium and the University of Amsterdam. From 1965 to 1984, she was a rock music critic for the Dutch daily newspaper de Volkskrant and the Dutch weekly magazine Vrij Nederland. She also served on a jury which awarded the Dutch Edison music awards in 1972. In 1978, de Waard published her first book of poems Afstand (Distance). She was a founding member of the Anna Bijns Foundation, which awards a prize to a Dutch female writer. She had a leading role in the group of women poets known as De Nieuwe Wilden (The New Savages).

== Selected works ==
- Luwte (Shelter) (1979)
- Furie (Fury) (1981)
- Strofen (1983)
- Anna Bijns (1985)
- Een wildernis van verbindingen (1986)
- Sara (1987)
- Onvoltooiing (1988)
- Eenzang (1992)
- Eenzang twee (1993)
- Het zij (Or she) (1995)
- Anderling (1998)
- Zestig (2000)
