= Saskia Weishut-Snapper =

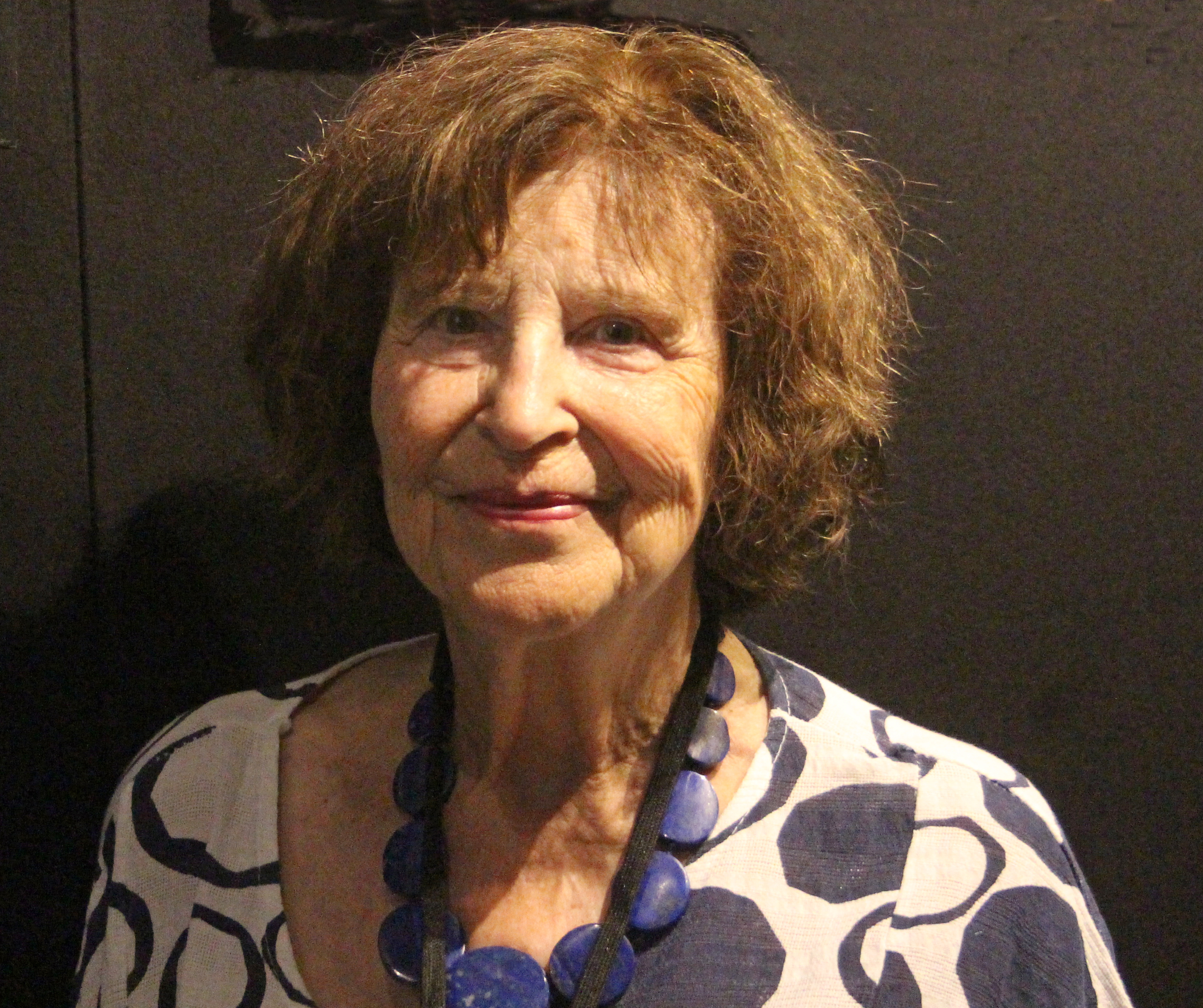
Saskia Weishut-Snapper, july 2023

Saskia Weishut-Snapper (born 5 August 1938) is a Dutch fiber artist.

== Early life and family ==
Saskia Snapper was born 5 August 1938 in Amsterdam. She grew up in the Netherlands, in Bergen, North Holland, a town with an art colony in which both her parents were active. Her mother was Mies Bloch, a painter and illustrator, mostly known for her cross-stitch designs. Her father was Rein Snapper, a painter, illustrator, and wood printer.

Saskia is married, has five sons, and lives in Amsterdam.

== Career ==
Weishut-Snapper turned to textile arts in 1970. Creating mixed media scenes somewhere between painting and quilting, she refers to her works as 'peintisseries'. The subjects of her art are often textile landscapes, fantasy buildings, abstract compositions and themes based on Jewish tradition. She mostly exhibits in the Netherlands. She also showed her paintings in Belgium, Germany, Greece, Japan, Portugal, Sweden, Switzerland, the United Kingdom and the United States.

Works by Weishut-Snapper appear in art galleries, museums, churches and synagogues and were incorporated in art books. On her eightieth birthday, she featured on Dutch television, in a short documentary in the series 'Naches'.
