= Kontakto =

Magazine in Esperanto

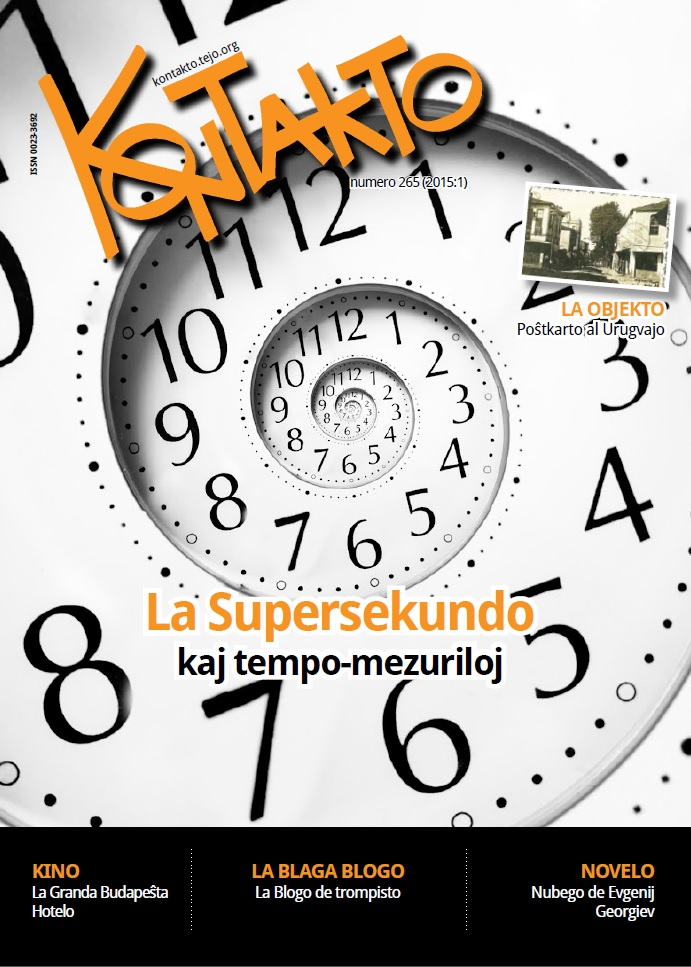
- Cover of the January 2015 issue
- Editor: Karina Oliveira
- Categories: Magazine
- Frequency: bimestrial
- Publisher: World Esperanto Association
- Founder: Humphrey Tonkin
- Founded: 1963
- Country: The Netherlands
- Based in: Rotterdam
- Language: Esperanto
- Website: https://www.tejo.org/agadoj/revuo-kontakto/
- ISSN: 0023-3692

Kontakto is an Esperanto magazine published by TEJO and supported by the Universal Esperanto Association (UEA). Its 6 annual issues have readers in about 100 countries. It started in 1963 through a proposal of the UEA committee by Humphrey Tonkin, who became its first editor-in-chief and who provided a magazine that touched on topics of interest to Esperanto youth. The magazine often used the slogan "In Esperanto, but not about Esperanto."

In the early 1980s, Anna Löwenstein became the editor. Her contributions to the magazine included easy-to-read articles, which concerned serious topics, but were written in simple language suitable for beginning Esperanto learners. This continues to be a primary focus for the magazine.

== List of editors ==
- Humphrey Tonkin
- Stefan Maul
- Simo Milojevic
- Giorgio Silfer (1975–1977)
- Jouko Lindstedt (1978)
- Giulio Cappa (1978–1979)
- Dario Besseghini
- Anna Löwenstein
- Leif Nordenstorm
- Francisco Javier Moleón (1990)
- István Ertl (1990–1991)
- Francisco Veuthey (1992–1998)
- Sabira Stahlberg (1998–2001)
- Yevgenia Amis (Ĵenja Zvereva Amis) (2002–2007)
- Pavel Mozhayev (2007–2010)
- Rogener Pavinski (2010–2023)
- Karina Oliveira (2023–2025)
- Thiago B Assumpção (2025–)
