= Catrijp =

- Hamlet

- Location in the Netherlands Location in the province of North Holland in the Netherlands
- Coordinates: 52°43′N 4°41′E
- Country: Netherlands
- Province: North Holland
- Municipality: Bergen

Area
  - Total: 1.92 km^{2} (0.74 sq mi)
- Elevation: 2.2 m (7.2 ft)

Population (2025)
  - Total: 315
  - Density: 164/km^{2} (425/sq mi)
- Time zone: UTC+1 (CET)
  - Summer (DST): UTC+2 (CEST)
- Postal code: 1871
- Dialing code: 072

Catrijp is a hamlet in the Dutch province of North Holland. It is a part of the municipality of Bergen, and lies about 9 km northwest of Alkmaar.

The name already appears in 1680 as Catryp. This name refers to a strip of land along water, probably water in the dunes. The first part (cat) of the name is unclear and has multiple meanings. Catrijp has no place name signs.
