= Aagtdorp =

- Hamlet
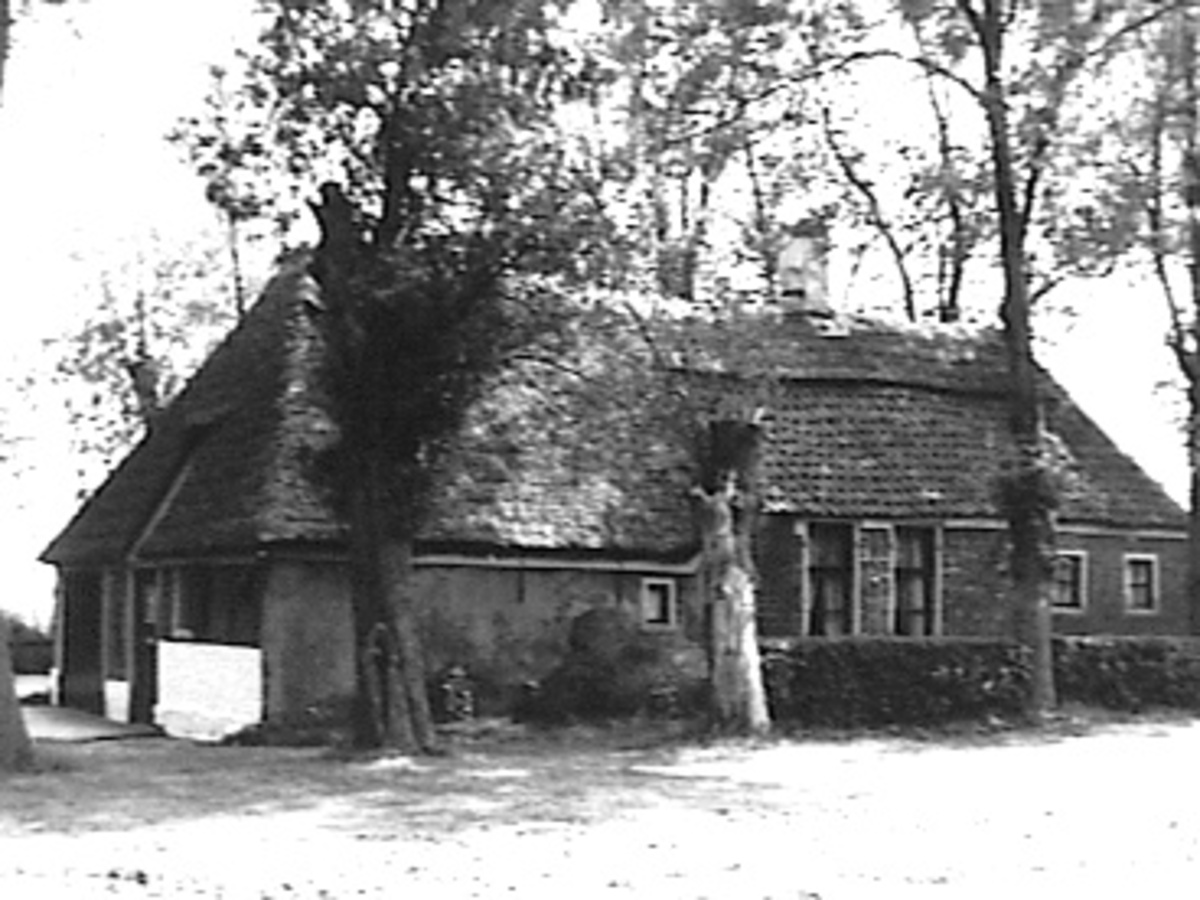
- Farm in Aagtdorp

- Location in the Netherlands Location in the province of North Holland in the Netherlands
- Coordinates: 52°41′N 4°42′E
- Country: Netherlands
- Province: North Holland
- Municipality: Bergen

Area
  - Total: 9.62 km^{2} (3.71 sq mi)
- Elevation: 2.2 m (7.2 ft)

Population (2025)
  - Total: 545
  - Density: 56.7/km^{2} (147/sq mi)
- Time zone: UTC+1 (CET)
  - Summer (DST): UTC+2 (CEST)
- Postal code: 1871
- Dialing code: 072

Aagtdorp (Dutch pronunciation: [ˈaːɣdɔr(ə)p]) is a hamlet in the Dutch province of North Holland. It is a part of the municipality of Bergen, and lies about 6 kilometres (3.7 mi) northwest of Alkmaar.

The hamlet was first mentioned between 1215 and 1226 as Ekthorp, and could mean "settlement in the corner/border". Aagtdorp was home to 111 people in 1840. From the 1950s onwards, camp sites were established in Aagtdorp and it became a recreational area.
