= Egmond-Binnen =

- Village
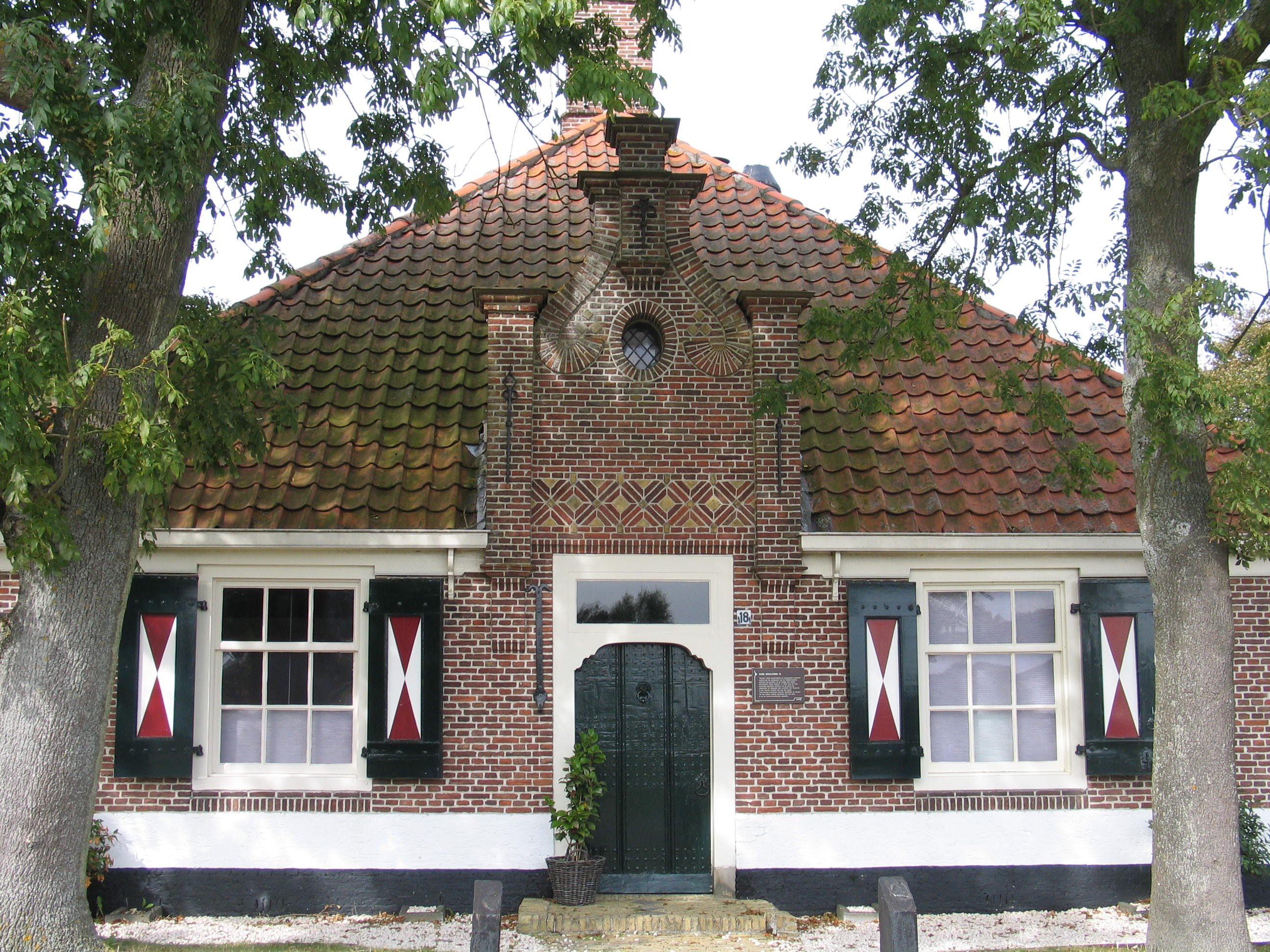
- Historic farm near Egmond-Binnen

- Flag Coat of arms

- Location in the Netherlands Location in the province of North Holland in the Netherlands
- Coordinates: 52°36′N 4°39′E
- Country: Netherlands
- Province: North Holland
- Municipality: Bergen

Area
  - Village: 10.52 km^{2} (4.06 sq mi)
- Elevation: 3.0 m (9.8 ft)

Population (2025)
  - Village: 2,680
  - Density: 255/km^{2} (660/sq mi)
  - Urban: 2,490
  - Rural: 195
- Time zone: UTC+1 (CET)
  - Summer (DST): UTC+2 (CEST)
- Postal code: 1935
- Dialing code: 023

Egmond-Binnen (Dutch pronunciation: [ˌɛxmɔndˈbɪnə(n)]) is a village in the Dutch province of North Holland. It is a part of the municipality of Bergen, and lies about 8 kilometres (5.0 mi) southwest of Alkmaar.

== History ==
The village was first mentioned in 922 as Ekmunde. The etymology is unknown. The missionary Adalbert of Egmond founded a chapel near Egmond-Binnen and died there around 740. In 922, the Benedictine Egmond Abbey was founded at the location and a settlement developed around it. The abbey was plundered and partially destroyed in 1573. The loot was used to finance the founding of Leiden University.

René Descartes lived in the village during the 1640s.

In 1789, the south tower collapsed, and the remainder was sold for demolition.

The Dutch Reformed church was built in 1836 at the former north tower of the abbey. Between 1914 and 1956, the church was built and a tower was added. In 1933, a new monastery was built in Egmond-Binnen and elevated to abbey in 1950.

Egmond-Binnen was home to 915 people in 1840. It was a separate municipality until 1978, when it merged with Egmond aan Zee and Egmond aan den Hoef to form the new municipality Egmond. In turn, Egmond was amalgamated into Bergen on 1 January 2001.

== Gallery ==
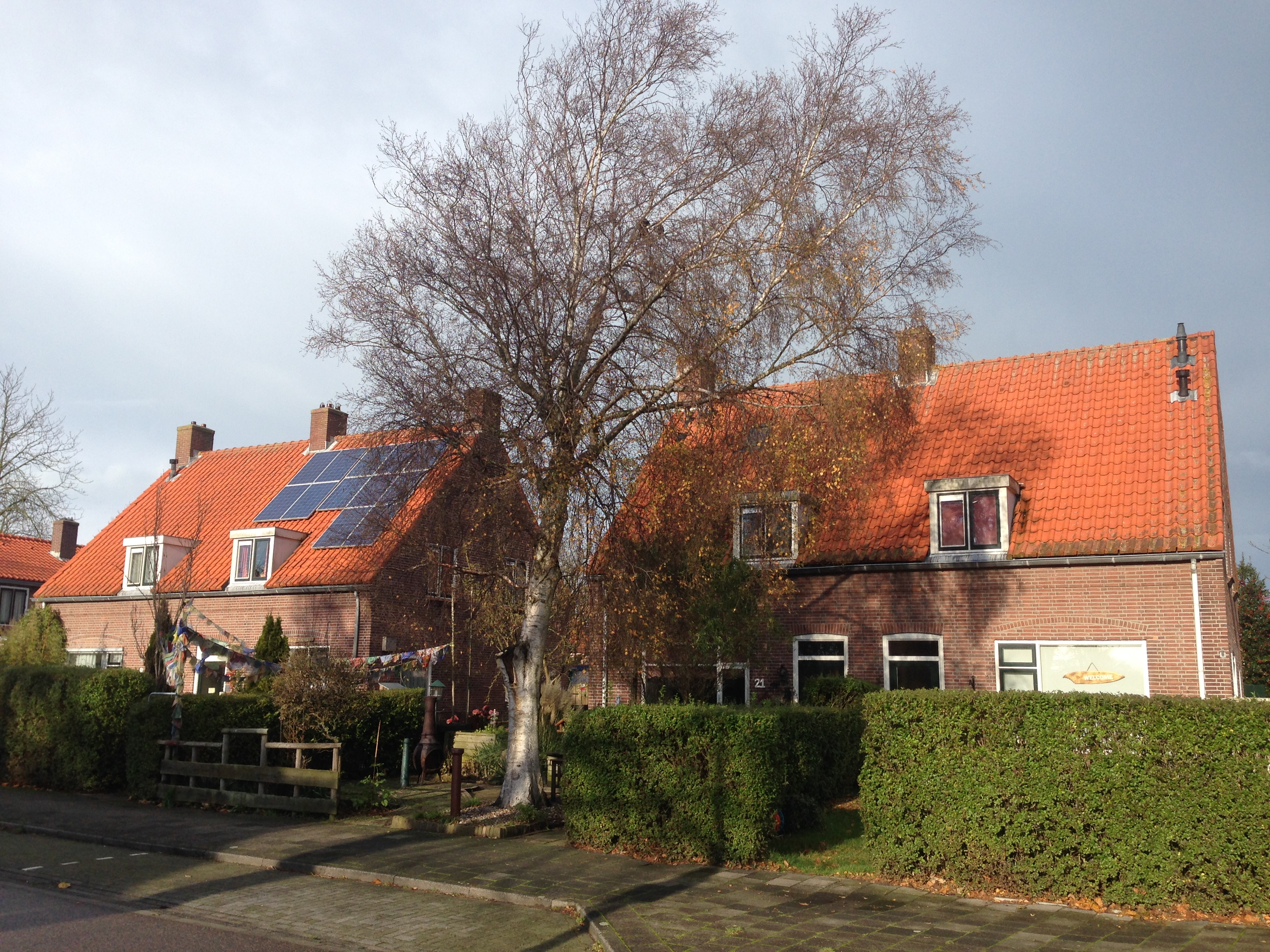
Houses in Egmond-Binnen

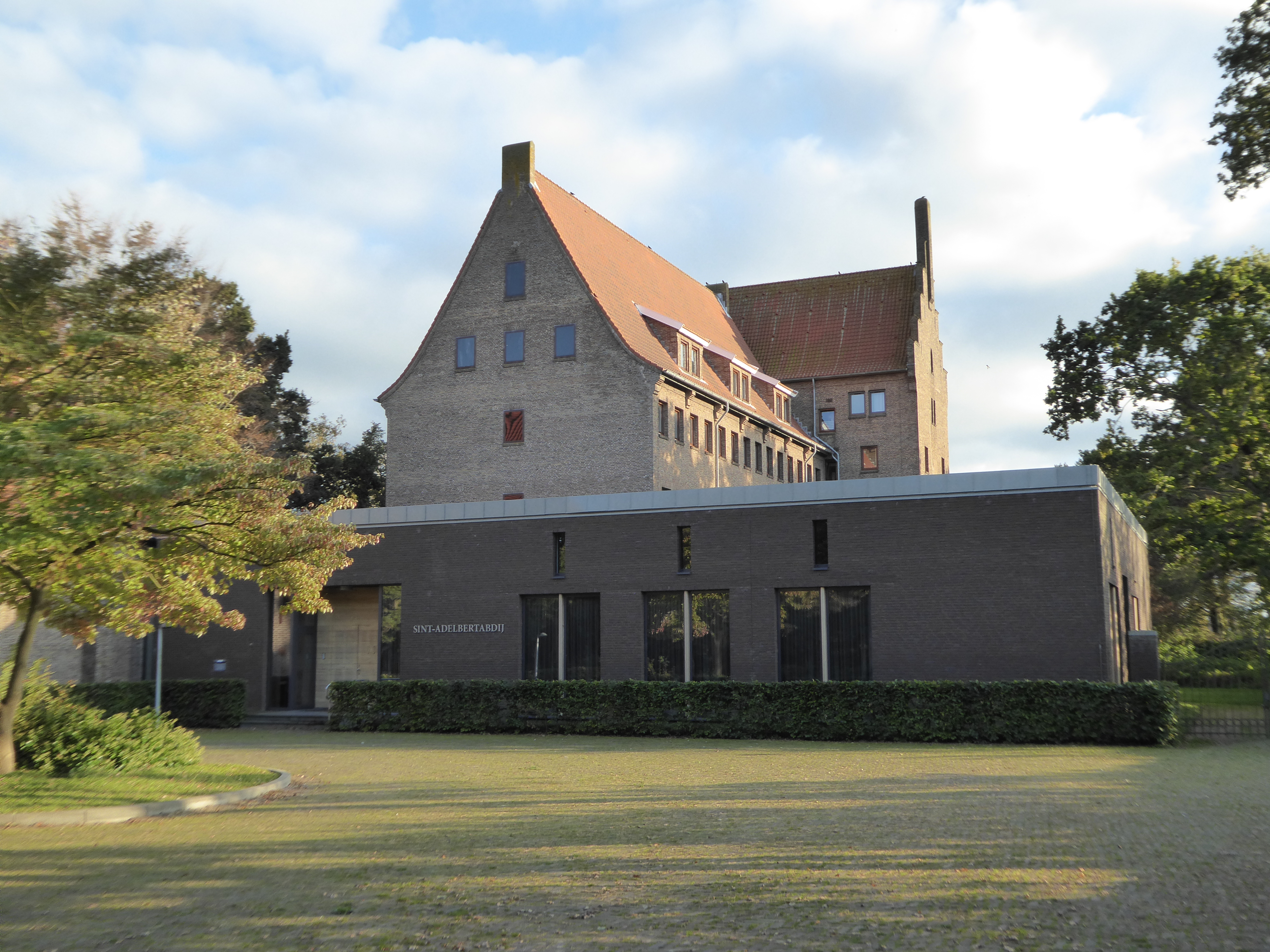
The new abbey

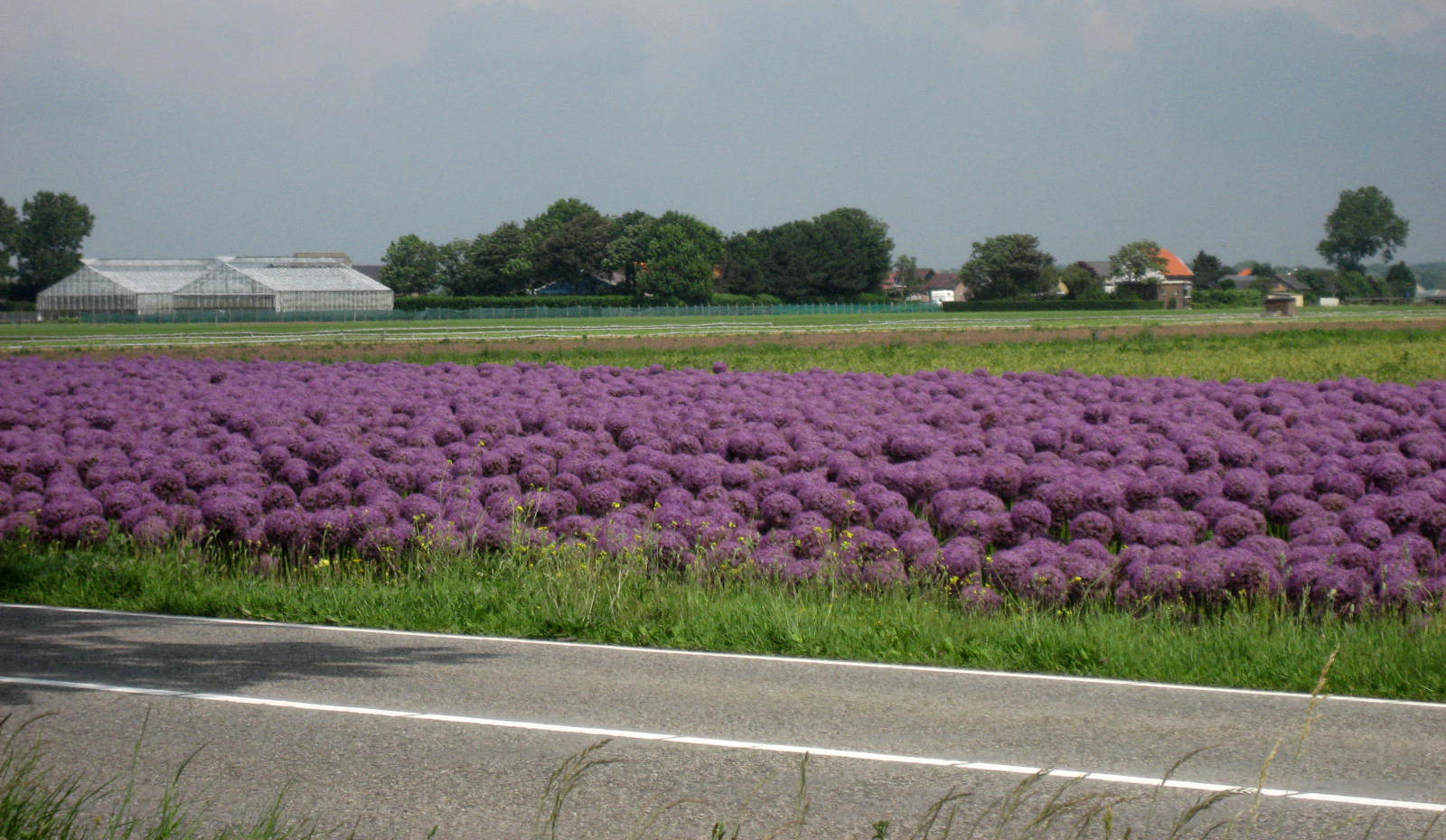
Flowers near Egmond-Binnen
