= Groet =

- Village
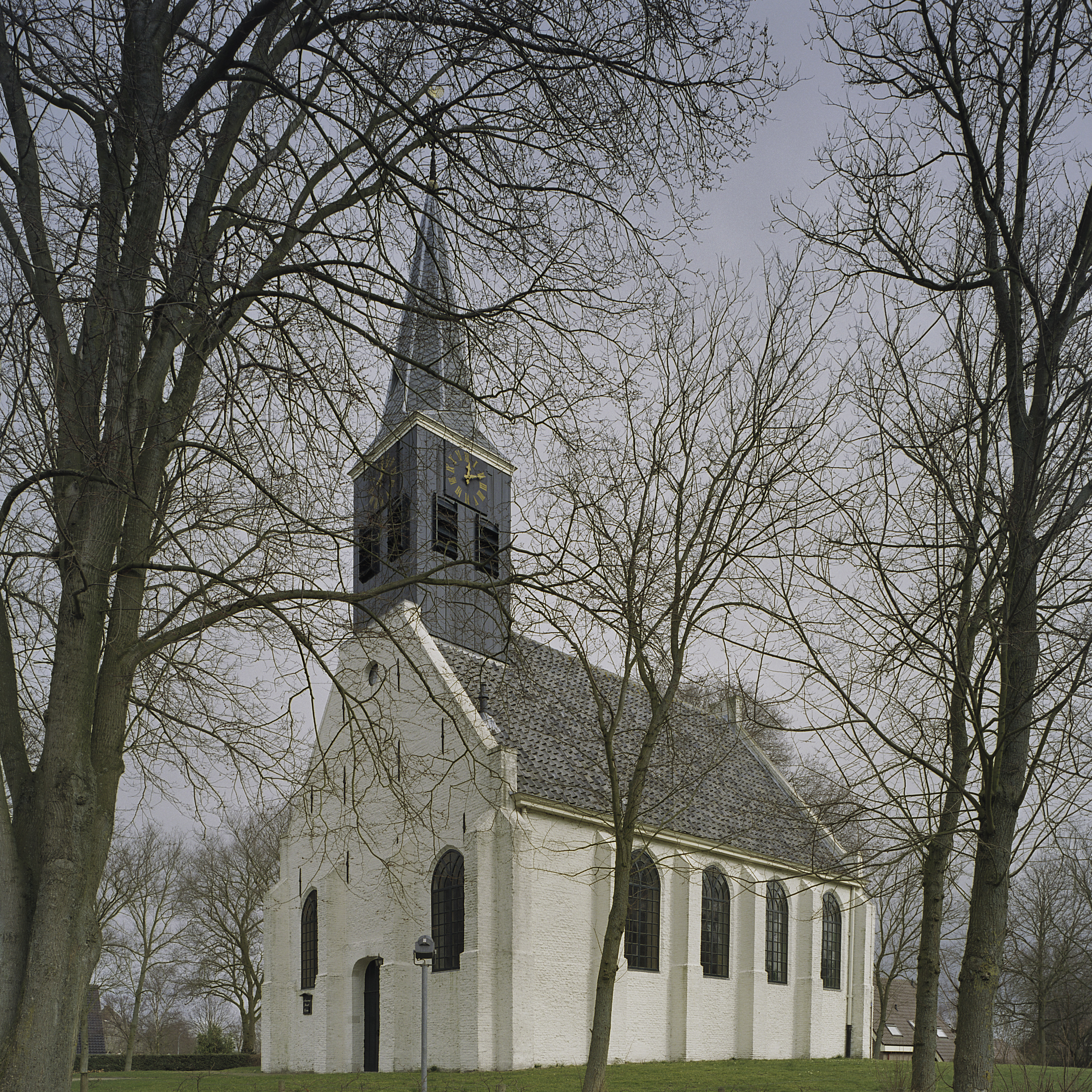
- Dutch Reformed church

- Flag Coat of arms

- Location in the Netherlands Location in the province of North Holland in the Netherlands
- Coordinates: 52°43′N 4°40′E
- Country: Netherlands
- Province: North Holland
- Municipality: Bergen

Area
  - Total: 3.29 km^{2} (1.27 sq mi)
- Elevation: 4.9 m (16 ft)

Population (2025)
  - Total: 1,525
  - Density: 464/km^{2} (1,200/sq mi)
- Time zone: UTC+1 (CET)
  - Summer (DST): UTC+2 (CEST)
- Postal code: 1873
- Dialing code: 072

Groet is a village in the Dutch province of North Holland. It is a part of the municipality of Bergen, and lies about 11 km northwest of Alkmaar.

== History ==
The village was first mentioned between 1130 and 1161 as "in Grothen", and means "land growth". Groet developed on the boundary of the dunes and the raised bog.

The Dutch Reformed church is a single aisled church with wooden tower which was built in 1639 and was modified in 1738. In 1830, the choir collapsed and was rebuilt shortly after.

The windmill Groetermolen is a polder mill was built in 1890. In 1977, a pumping station was built and the wind mill was decommissioned resulting in a deterioration of the wind mill, therefore, it was decided to drain the polder both by the mill and the pumping station. Groetermolen is still in active service.

In 1639, a little town hall was built in Groet. It claims to be the smallest and oldest town hall of the Netherlands. The oldest claim is definitely not true, but it may be the smallest.

Groet was a separate municipality between 1817 and 1834, when it was merged with Schoorl. The village was home to 186 people in 1840. In 2001, it became part of the municipality of Bergen.

The 1st and the 4th International Youth Congress of Esperanto, in 1938 and 1948 respectively, took place in Groet.

== Gallery ==
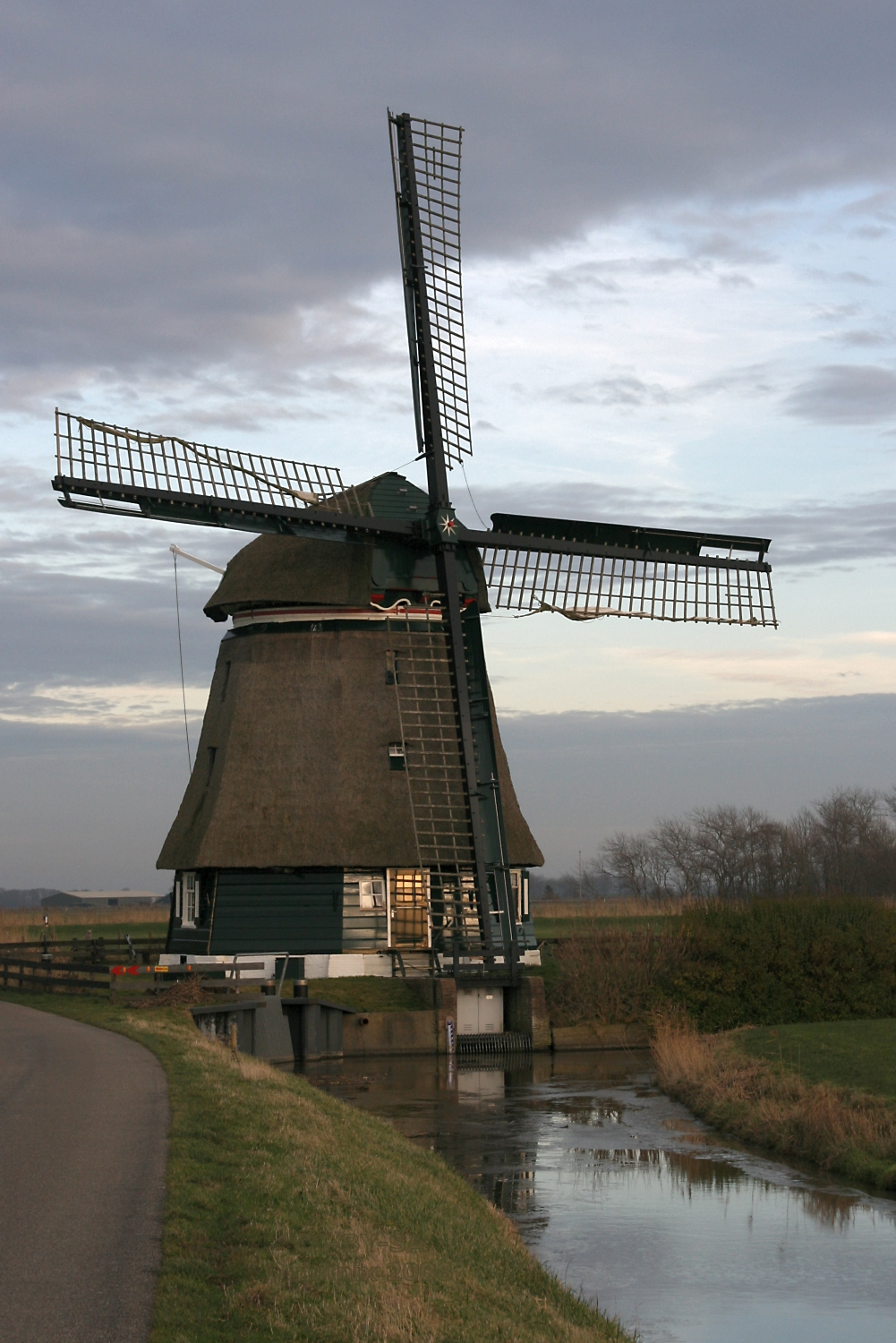
Windmill Groetermolen

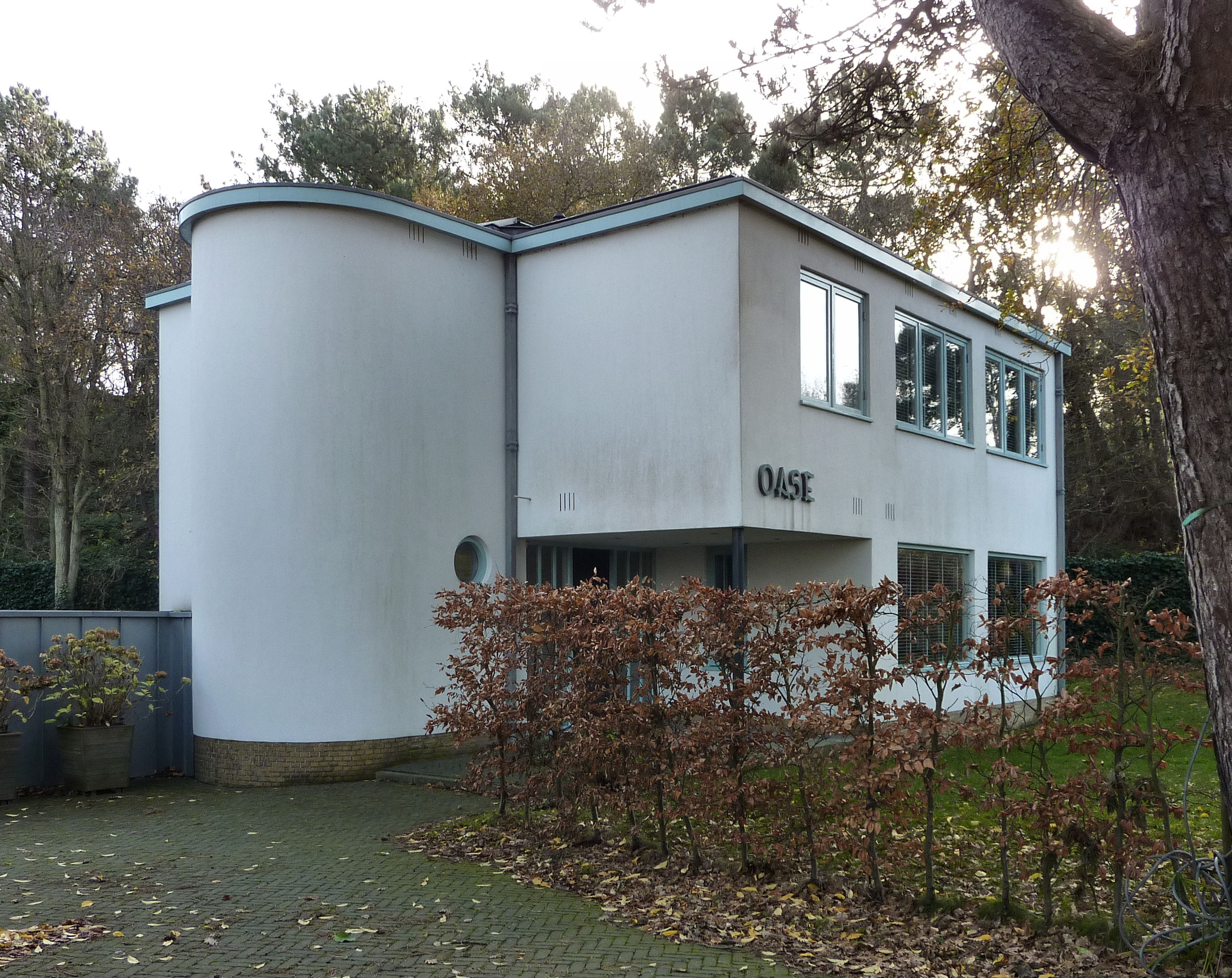
Villa Oase

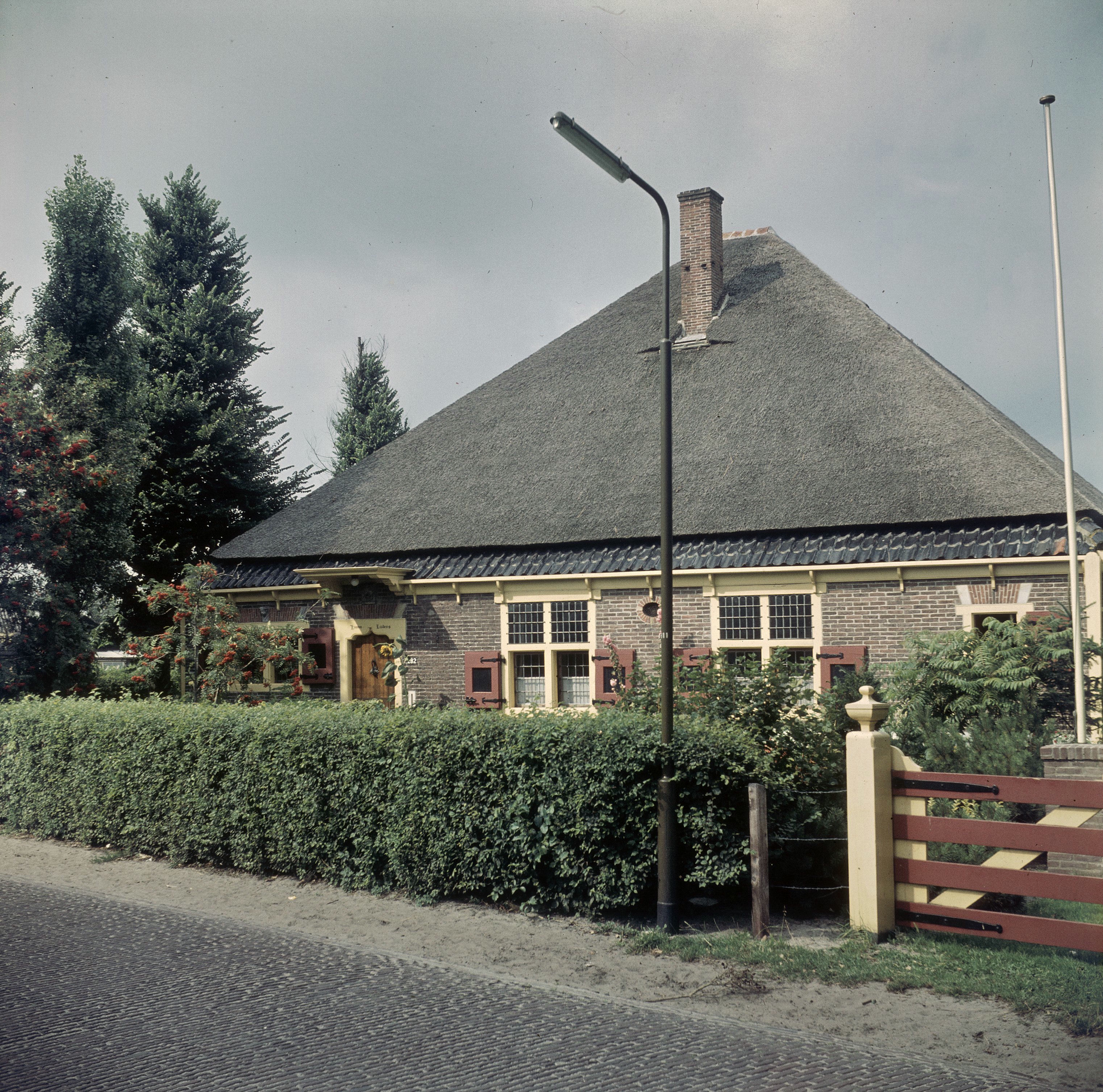
Farm in Groet

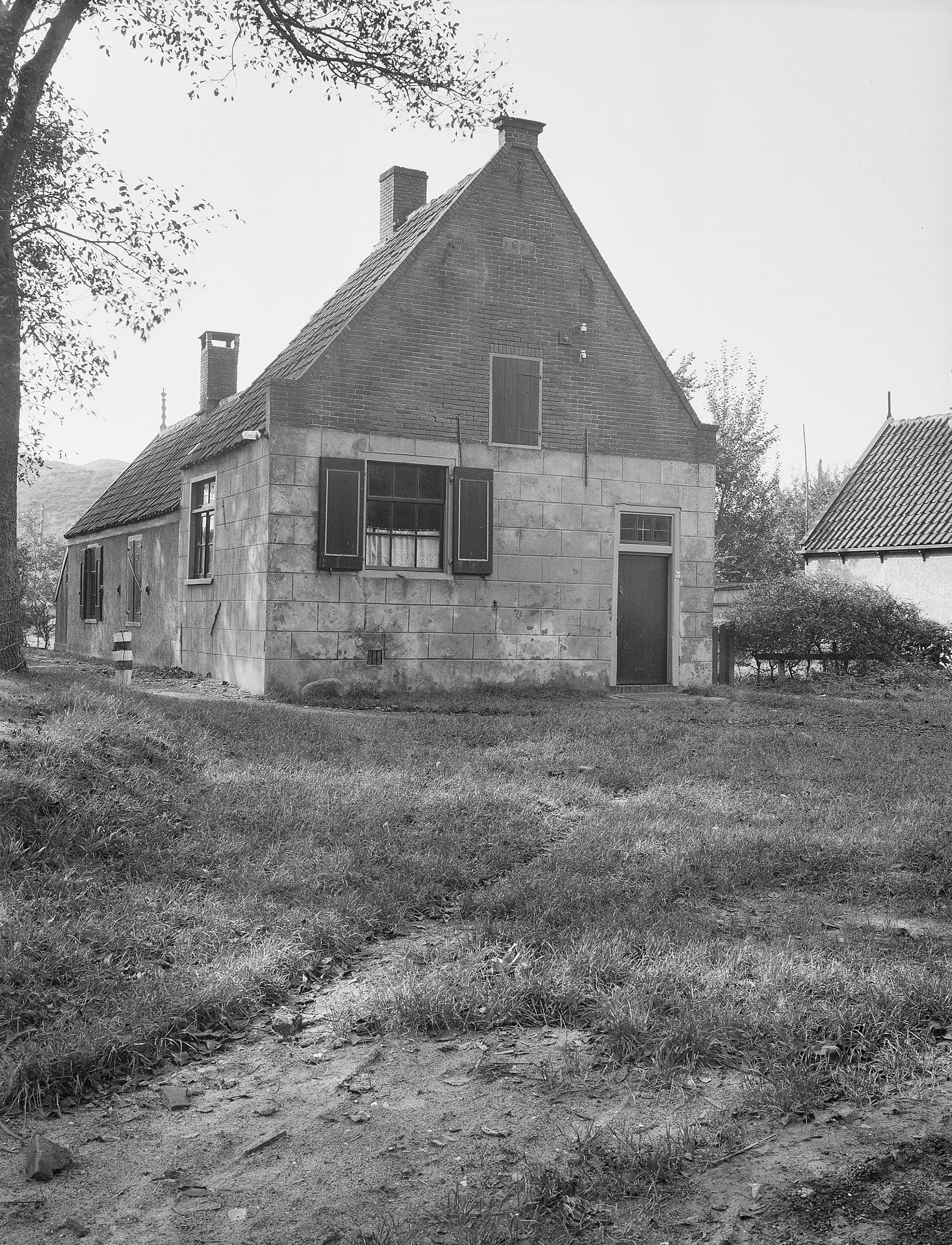
Former town hall
