= Egmont Castle =

Coordinates: 50.8728°N 3.8091°E

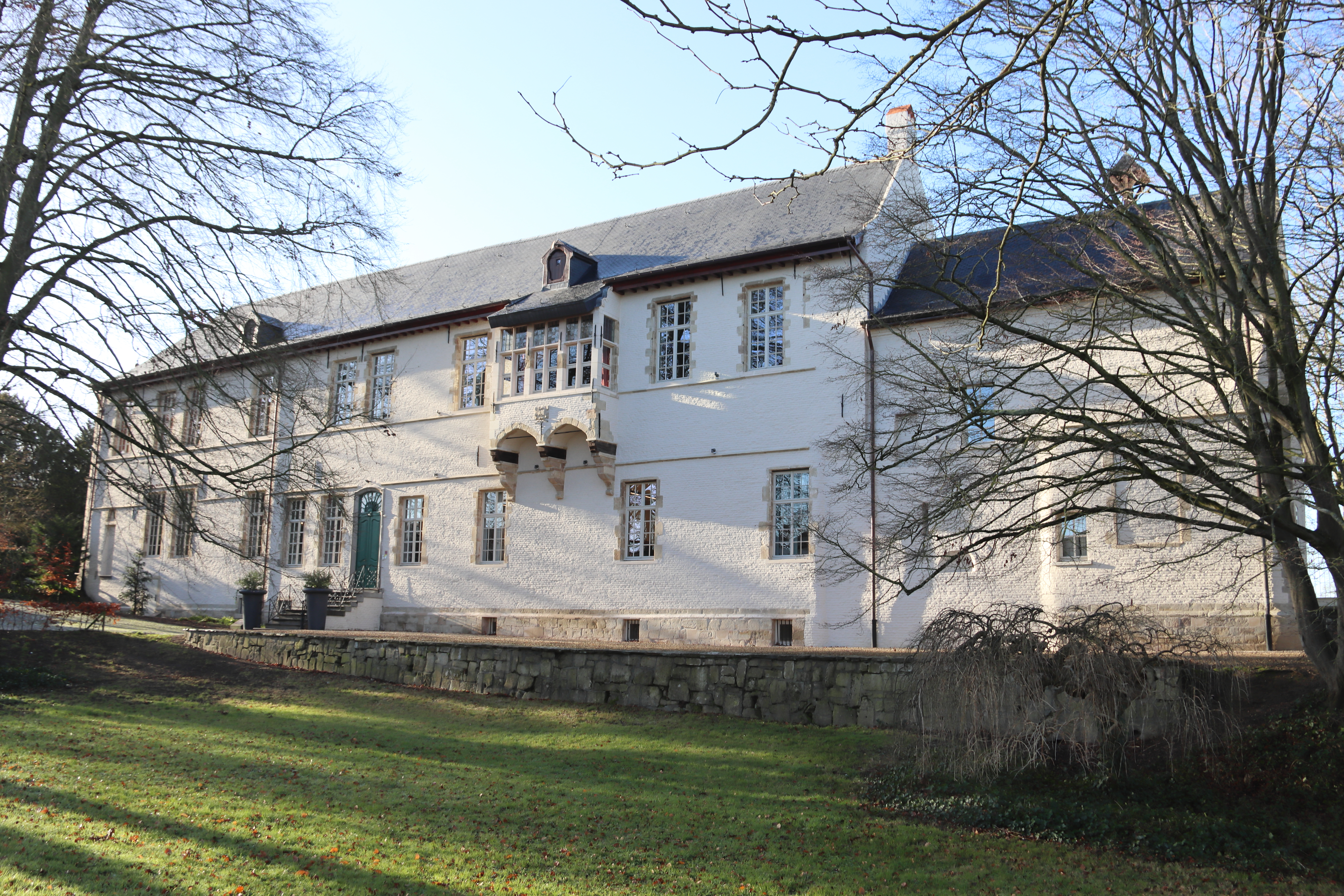
Egmont Castle in Zottegem

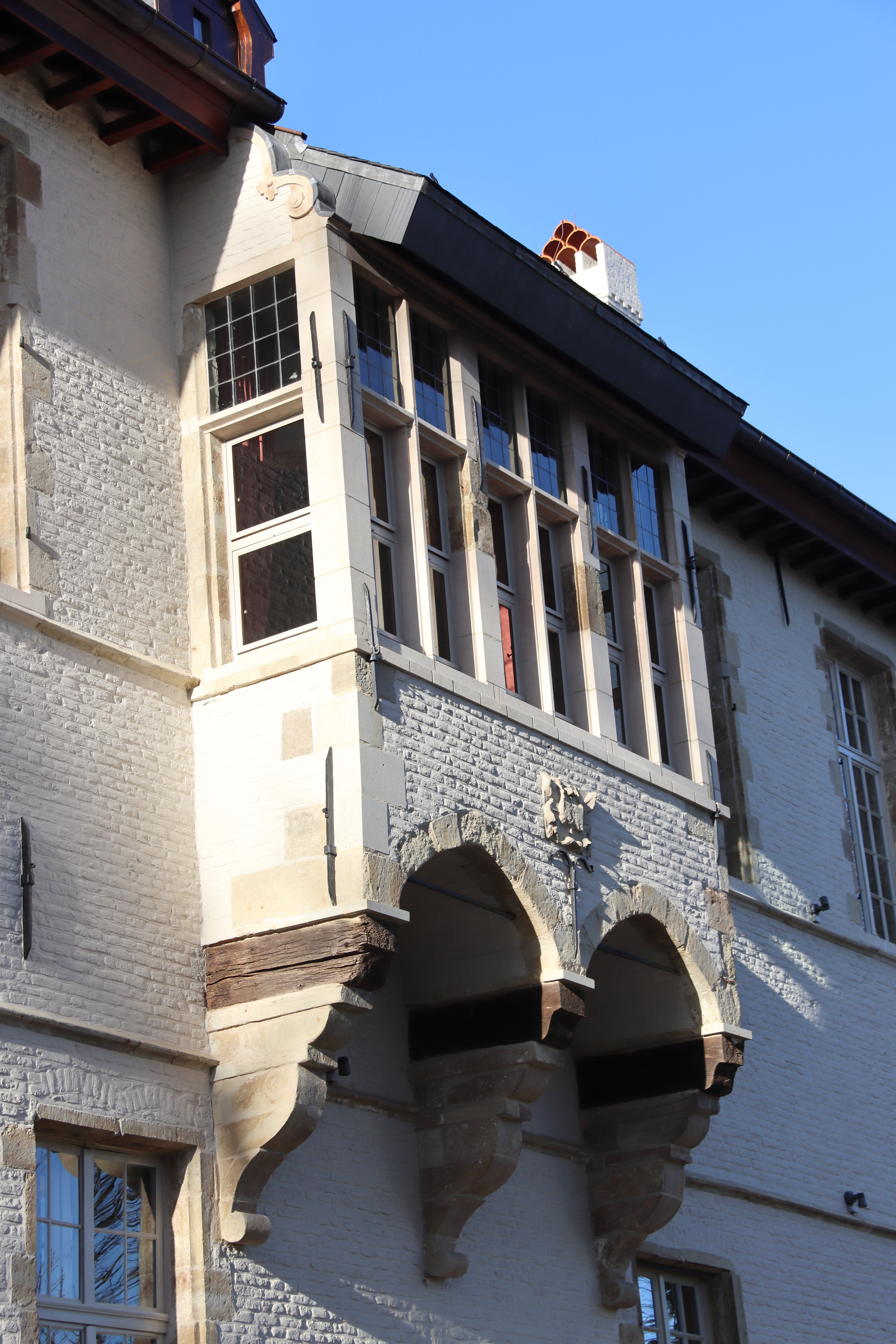
Oriel window of Egmont Castle

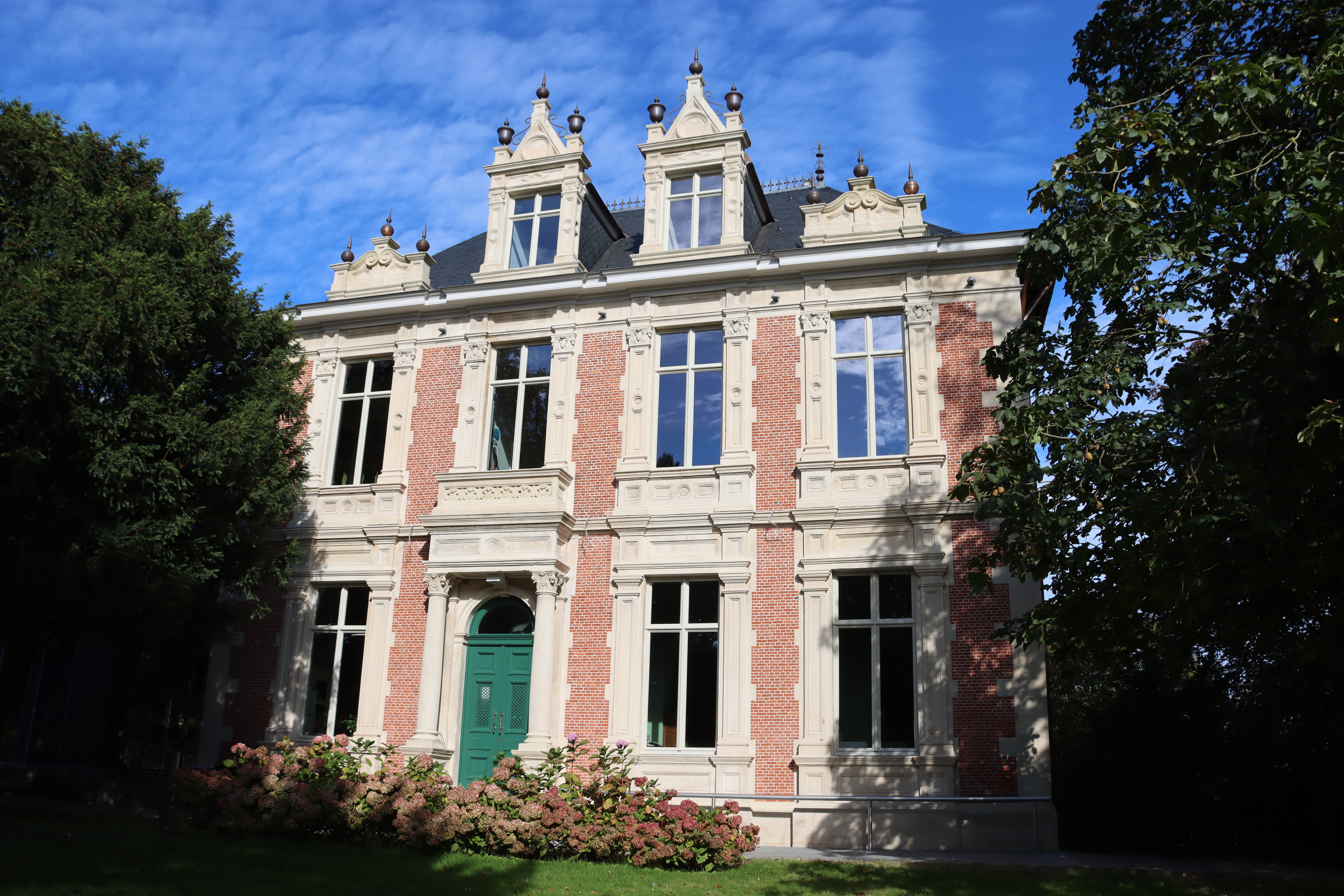
Neo-renaissance facade

Egmont Castle or the Castle of (Lamoral count of) Egmont (Dutch: Egmontkasteel or Kasteel van Egmont) is a castle in Zottegem, Belgium. It has been declared a cultural heritage monument.

== History ==
The history of the castle goes back to the 11th century, when a motte-and-bailey castle was supposedly constructed by the rulers of Zottegem (the first one being mentioned in a charter (1083) was Rothardus). Around 1150, a stone keep was built and also a Romanesque aisleless church with a churchyard around it. The remains of that church were excavated in 1994. At the end of the 12th century, the big hall was rebuilt in brick by Walter II.

Over the centuries, the castle became the possession of different ruling families: the House of Antoing and the House of Melun (13th and 14th centuries), the House of Luxembourg-Fiennes (15th century). During the Revolt of Ghent, the castle was taken in 1381. In 1452, the castle was besieged during another Revolt of Ghent. Around 1477, the castle was dismantled and rebuilt. On 19 May 1516, Charles V, Holy Roman Emperor visited the castle.

From 1530 until 1707, the castle belonged to the House of Egmont, who started rebuilding the ancient castle into a luxury mansion. Lamoral, Count of Egmont inherited the castle from his brother in 1541. He had the Knights' Room (Ridderzaal) refurbished with a Renaissance oriel window and floor tiling from Antwerp. In September 1566, Lamoral moved from the Egmont Palace in Brussels to the castle; on 7 September 1566, he wrote a letter to William of Orange from the castle.

After Lamoral's beheading in 1568 on the Grand-Place/Grote Markt of Brussels, the castle was confiscated by the Spanish until 1577. During the Eighty Years' War, the castle was damaged several times (in 1570, 1579 and 1580). In 1645 and 1658, the castle suffered from French troops, as in 1671 and 1684 during the War of the Spanish Succession. French troops stayed in the castle during the Nine Years' War in 1690 and 1697.

Starting from 1707, the castle was acquired by a branch of the House of Pignatelli. Marie Claire of Egmont (1661-1714), the sister of the last male heir of Lamoral, count of Egmont was married to Niccolo Pignatelli. After 1747, parts of the castle were demolished. In 1797, the castle was confiscated by the French. In 1815, it was sold to Baron Lefèbvre from Tournai. He divided the castle into two parts. In 1867, a neo-Renaissance facade was erected.

In 1957 and 1965, the city of Zottegem bought the two parts of the castle, which was used afterwards as a hospital, a school and art gallery. Since 1982, the castle has housed the local library, for which a new building was added to the castle in 1986. Between 1994 and 1997, the castle was restored. The Knights' Room has been used for wedding ceremonies, concerts and conferences ever since. In 2022, a new restoration campaign started.

In the surrounding Egmont Park, archaeological remains of the former church, castle walls, moats and (draw)bridge can be seen. The wrought iron Statue of Egmont (1872) by sculptor Jan-Robert Calloigne also stands in the park.

== Images ==
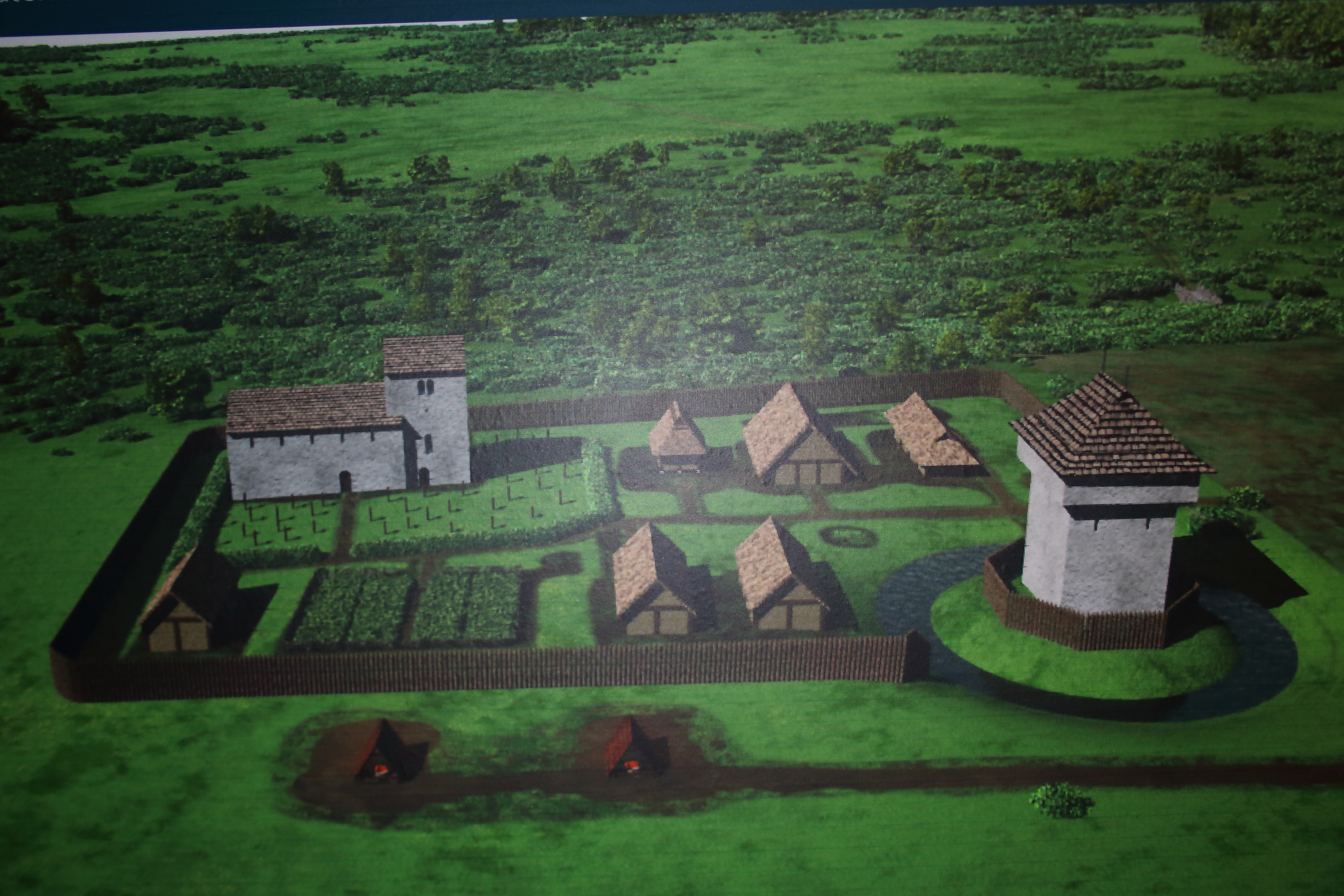
12th century

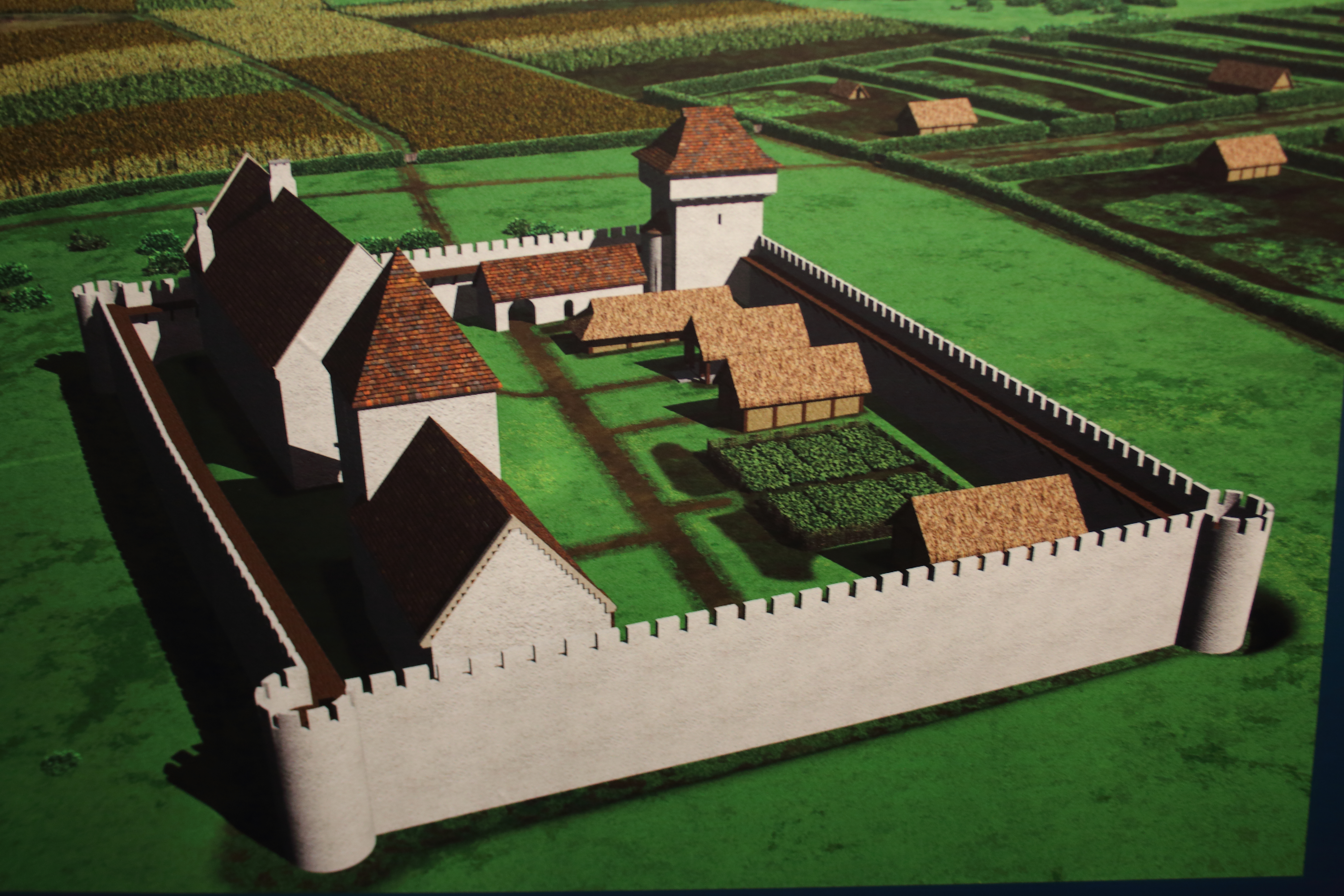
14th century

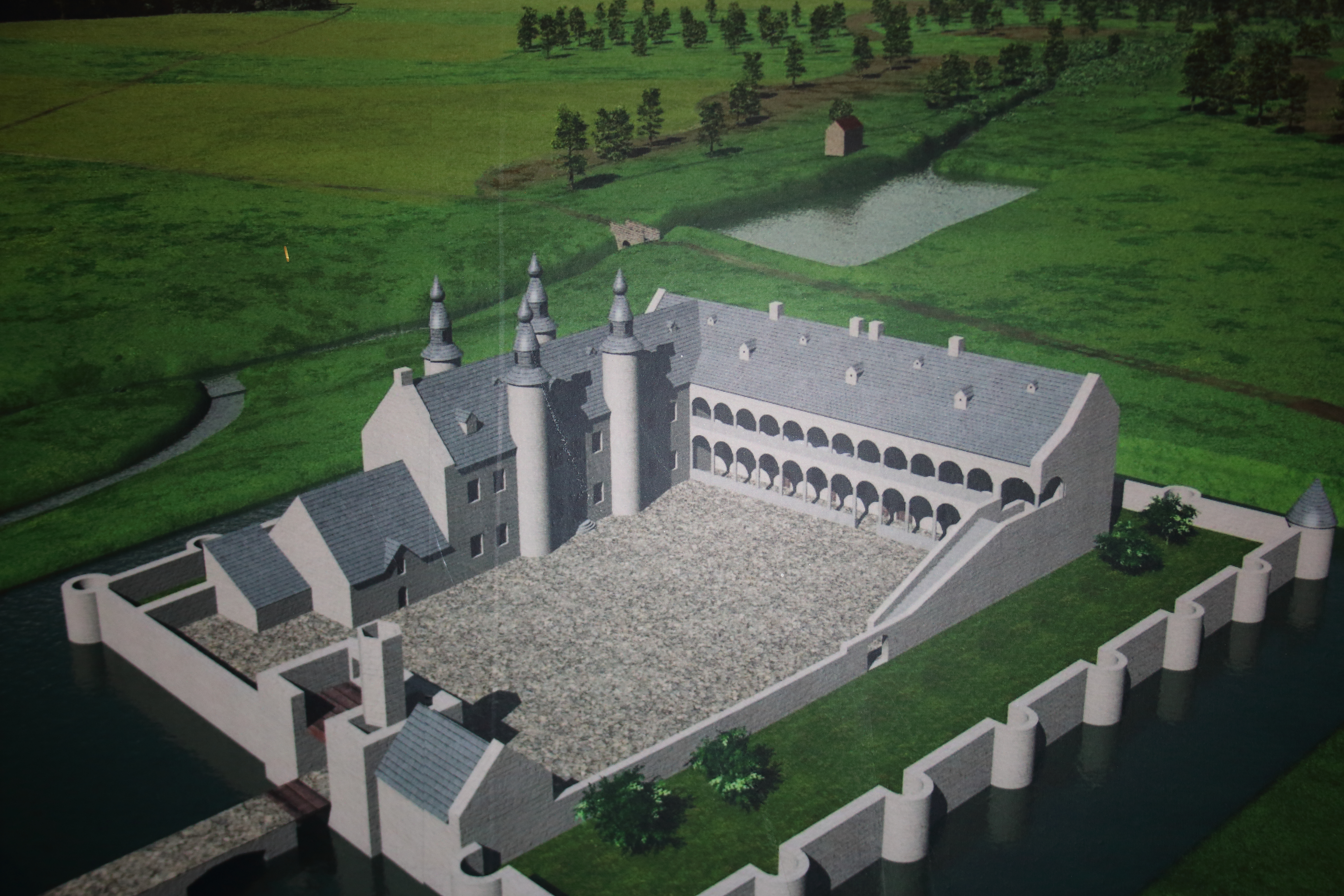
17th century

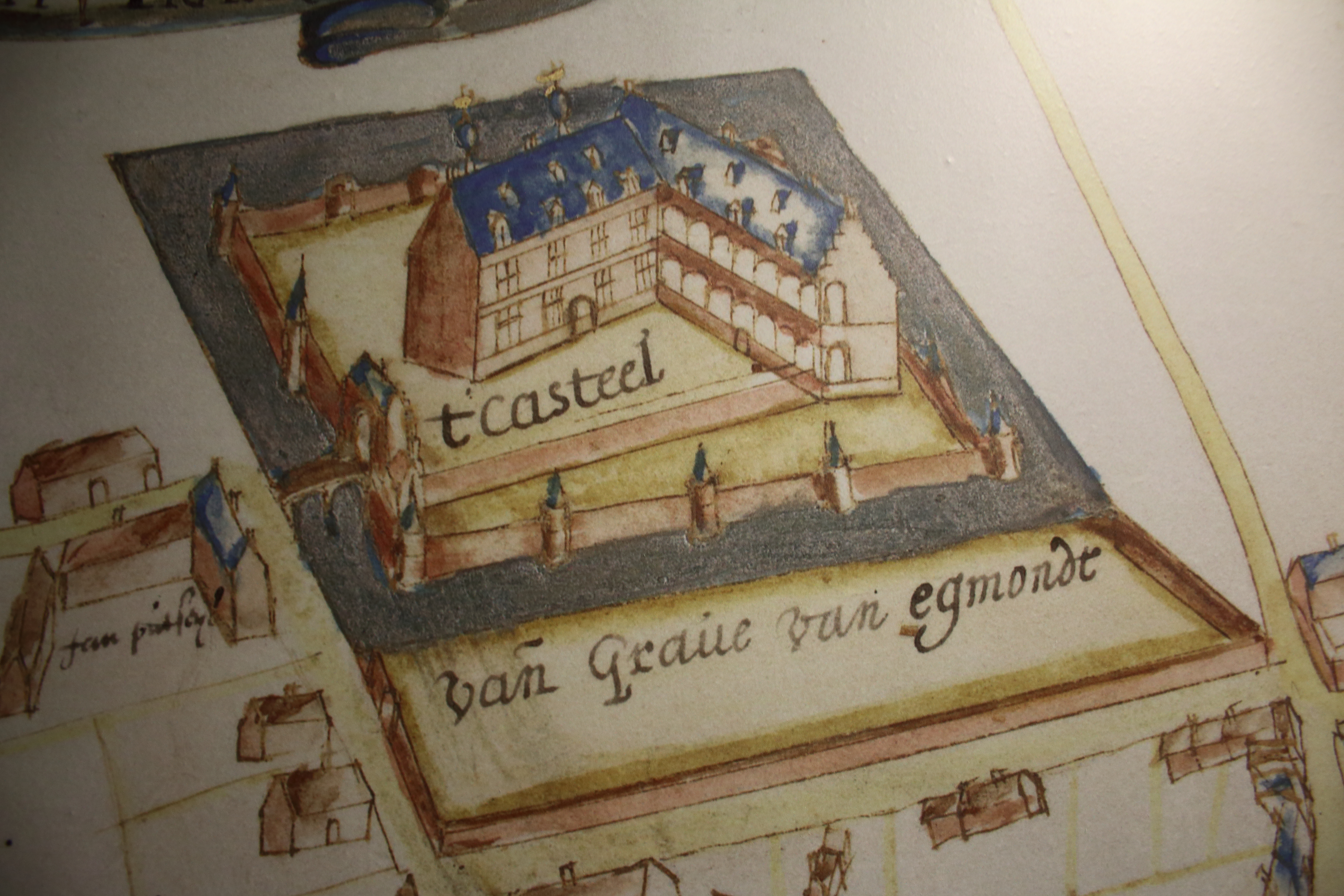
Egmont Castle in 1629

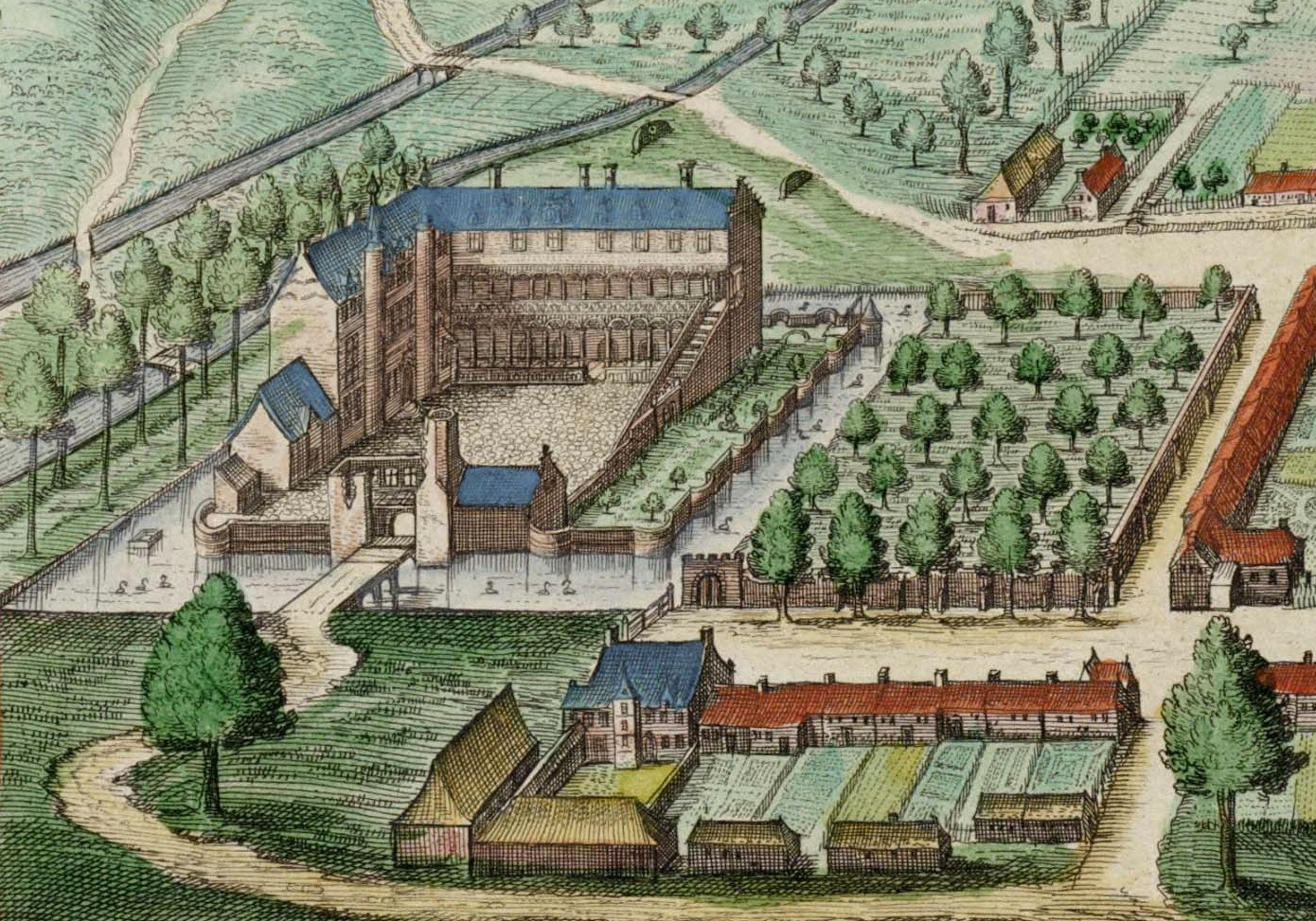
Egmont Castle in 1641

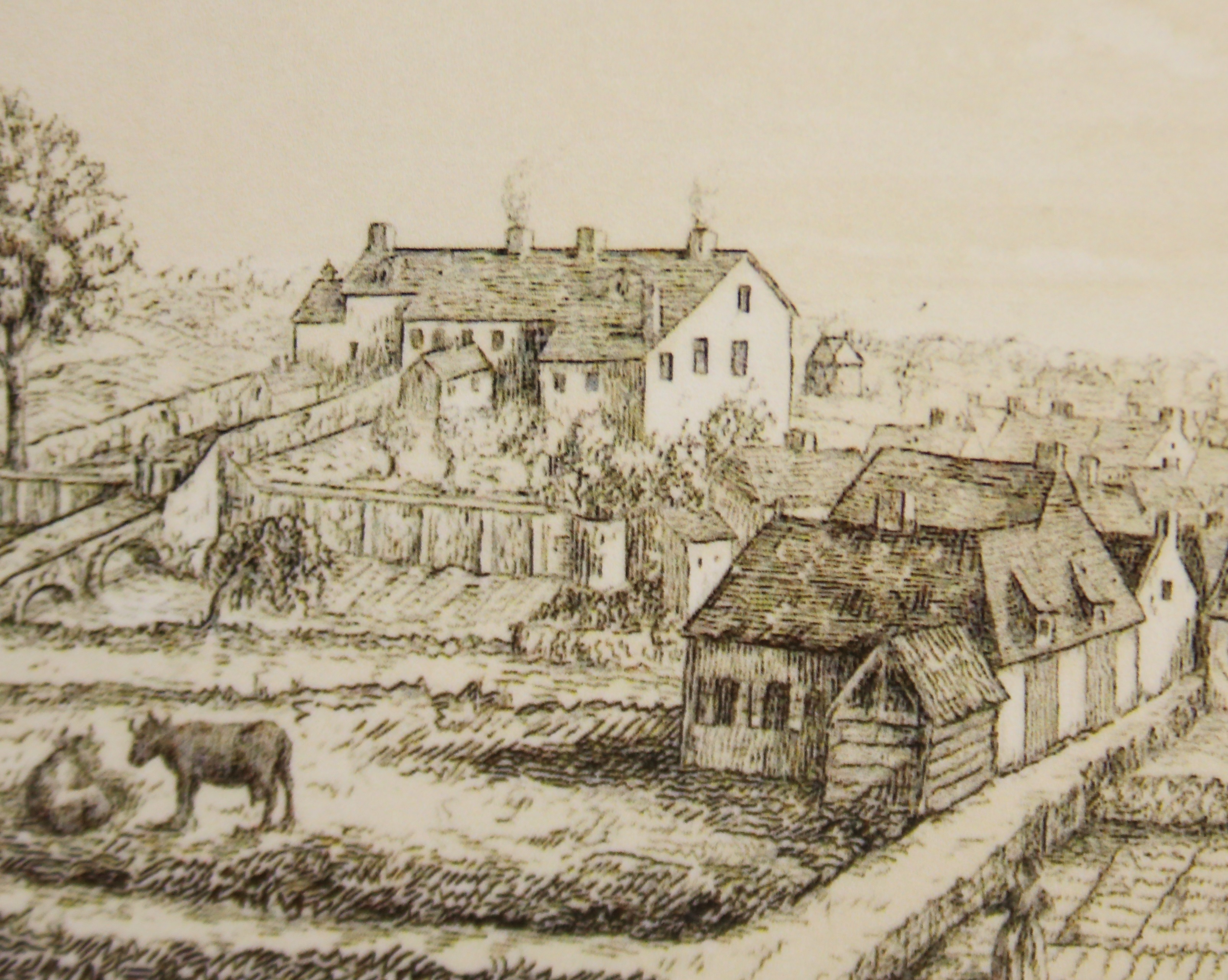
Egmont Castle in 1853

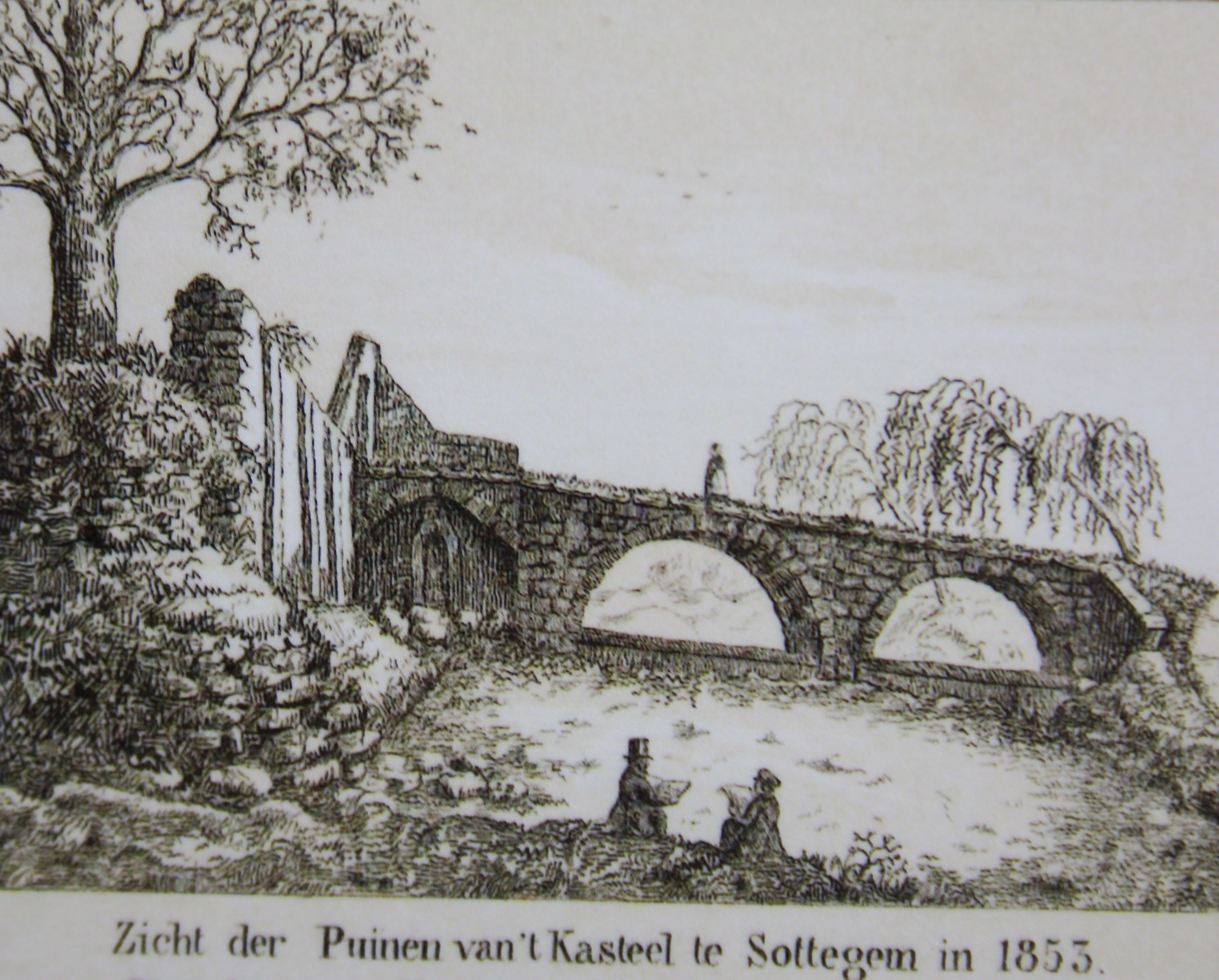
Bridge of the castle in 1853

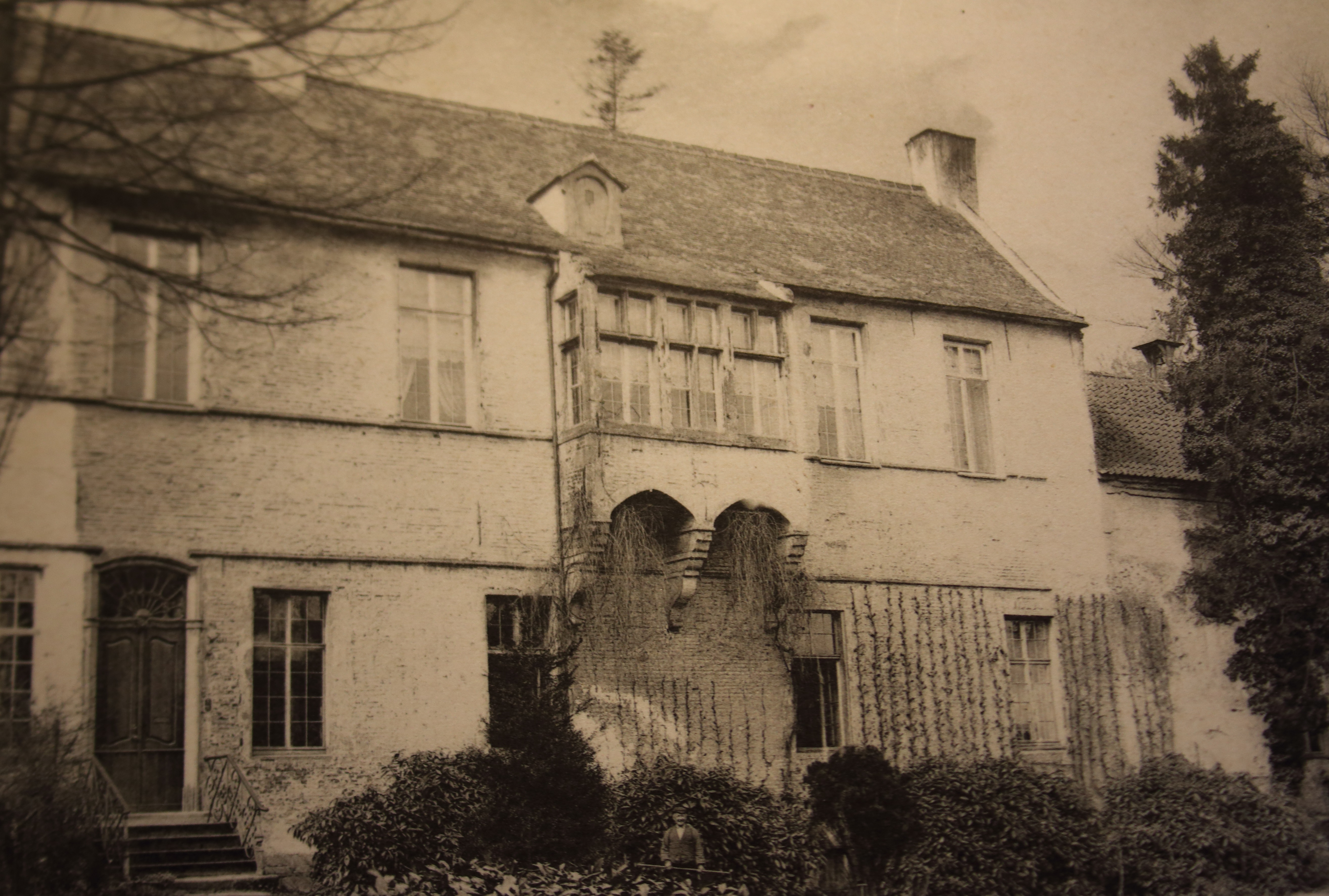
Beginning of the 20th century

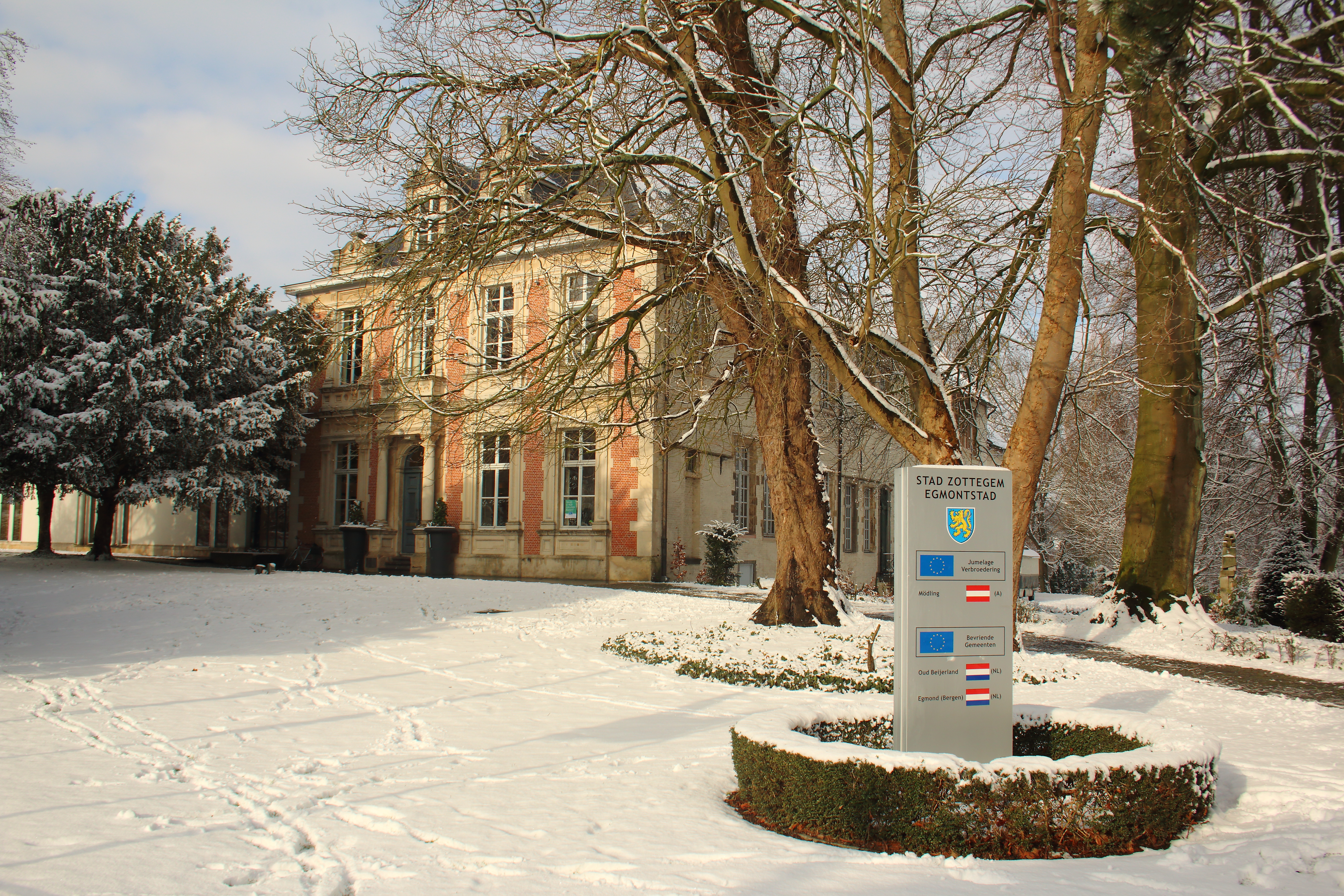
Egmont Castle in 2019

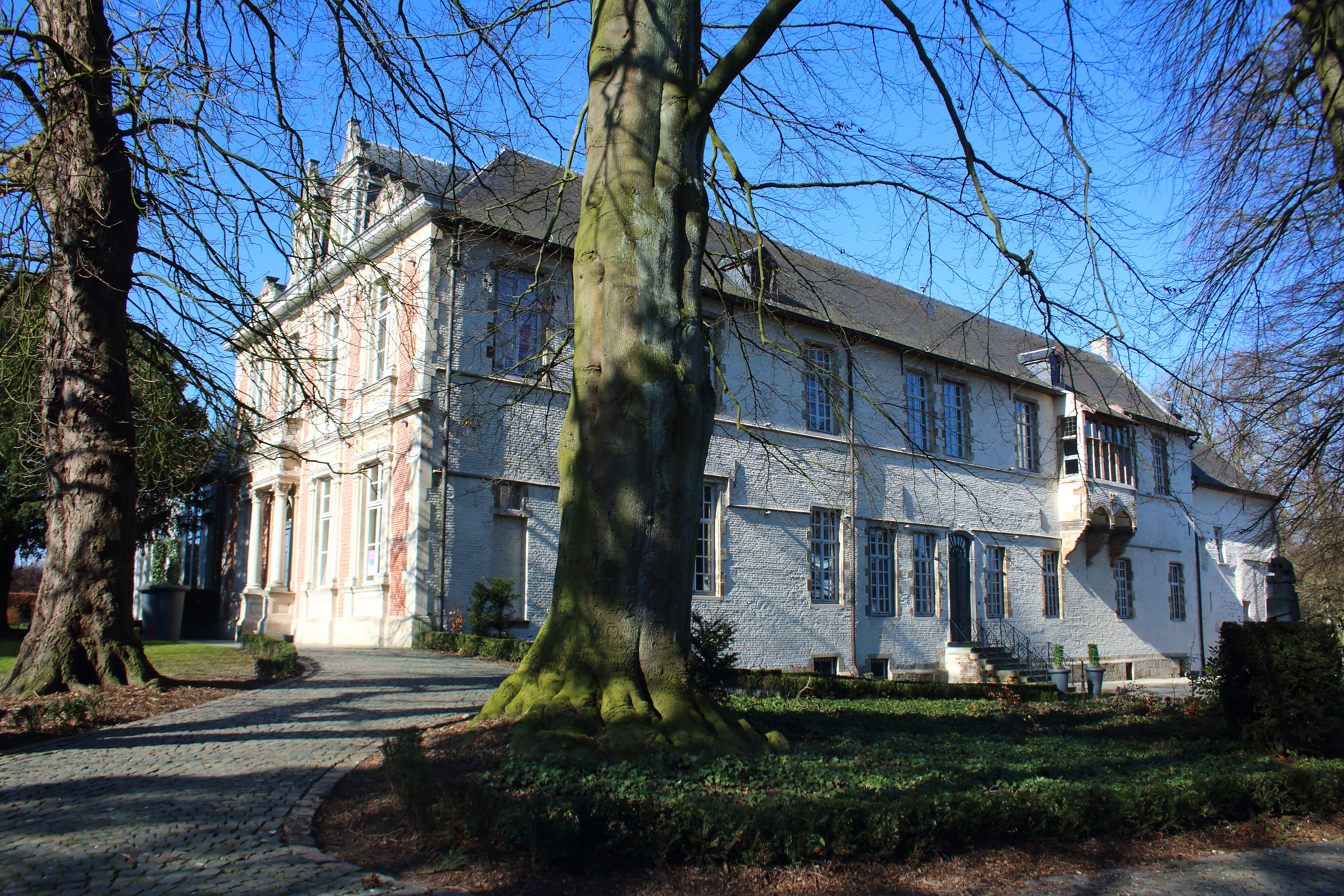
Egmont Castle and surrounding Egmont Park

== See also ==
Other palaces and castle of the Egmond family:

- Egmond Castle
- Egmont Palace in Brussels
- Château de Lahamaide
- Château de Braine
