= André Le Nôtre =

French landscape architect (1613–1700)

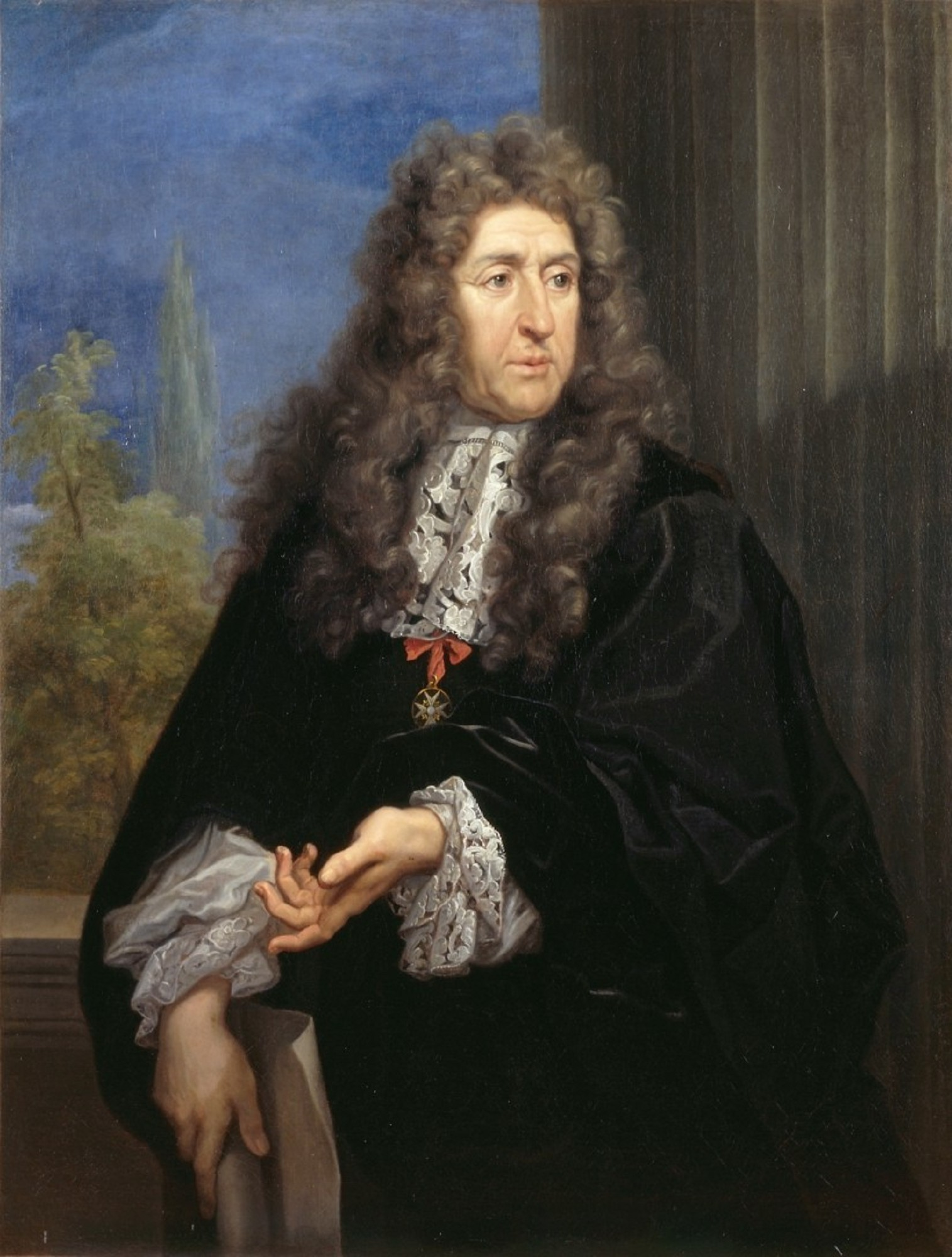
- A portrait of André Le Nôtre by Carlo Maratta
- Born: 12 March 1613; Paris, France
- Died: 15 September 1700 (aged 87); Paris, France
- Resting place: Saint-Roch, Paris
- Citizenship: French
- Known for: Landscape architecture, gardening
- Notable work: Versailles, Chantilly, Vaux-le-Vicomte, Bicton
- Spouse: Françoise Langlois (m. 1640)
- Children: 3

André Le Nôtre (French pronunciation: [ɑ̃dʁe lə notʁ]; 12 March 1613 – 15 September 1700), originally rendered as André Le Nostre, was a French landscape architect and the principal gardener of King Louis XIV of France. He was the landscape architect who designed the gardens of the Palace of Versailles; his work represents the height of the French formal garden style, or jardin à la française.

Prior to working on Versailles, Le Nôtre collaborated with Louis Le Vau and Charles Le Brun on the park at Vaux-le-Vicomte. His other works include the design of gardens and parks at Bicton Park Botanical Gardens, Chantilly, Fontainebleau, Saint-Cloud and Saint-Germain. His contribution to planning was also significant: at the Tuileries in Paris he extended the westward vista, which later became the Avenue des Champs-Élysées within the Axe historique.

== Biography ==
=== Early life ===
André Le Nôtre was born in Paris, a family of gardeners. Pierre Le Nôtre, who was in charge of the Tuileries Garden in 1572, may have been his grandfather. André's father Jean Le Nôtre was also responsible for sections of the Tuileries gardens, initially under Claude Mollet, and later as head gardener, during the reign of Louis XIII. André was born on 12 March 1613, and was baptised at the Église Saint-Roch. His godfather at the ceremony was an administrator of the royal gardens, and his godmother was the wife of Claude Mollet.

The family lived in a house within the Tuilieries, and André thus grew up surrounded by gardening, and quickly acquired both practical and theoretical knowledge. The location also allowed him to study in the nearby Palais du Louvre, part of which was then used as an academy of the arts. He learned mathematics, painting and architecture, and entered the atelier of Simon Vouet, painter to Louis XIII, where he met and befriended the painter Charles Le Brun. He learned classical art and perspective, and studied for several years under the architect François Mansart, a friend of Le Brun.

=== Career ===
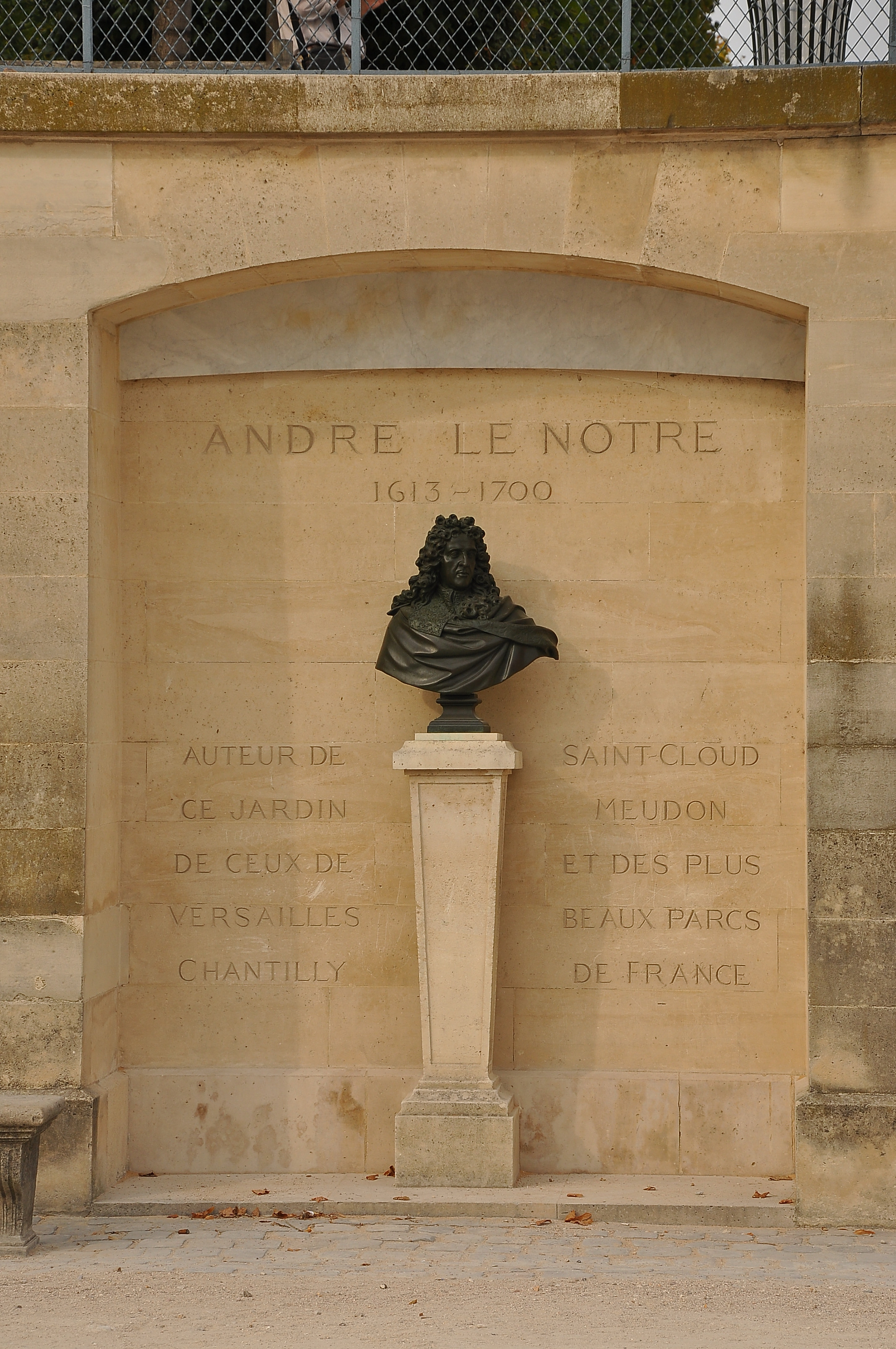
Bust of André Le Nôtre at the Garden of the Tuileries

In 1635, Le Nôtre was named the principal gardener of the king's brother Gaston, Duke of Orléans. On 26 June 1637, Le Nôtre was appointed head gardener at the Tuileries, taking over his father's position. He had primary responsibility for the areas of the garden closest to the palace, including the orangery built by Simon Bouchard. In 1643 he was appointed "draughtsman of plants and terraces" for Anne of Austria, the queen mother, and from 1645 to 1646 he worked on the modernisation of the gardens of the Palace of Fontainebleau.

He was later put in charge of all the royal gardens of France, and in 1657 he was further appointed Controller-General of the Royal Buildings. There are few direct references to Le Nôtre in the royal accounts, and Le Nôtre himself seldom wrote down his ideas or approach to gardening. He expressed himself purely through his gardens. He became a trusted advisor to Louis XIV, and in 1675 he was ennobled by the King. He and Le Brun even accompanied the court at the Siege of Cambrai (1677).

In 1640, he married Françoise Langlois. They had three children, although none survived to adulthood.

==== Vaux-le-Vicomte ====
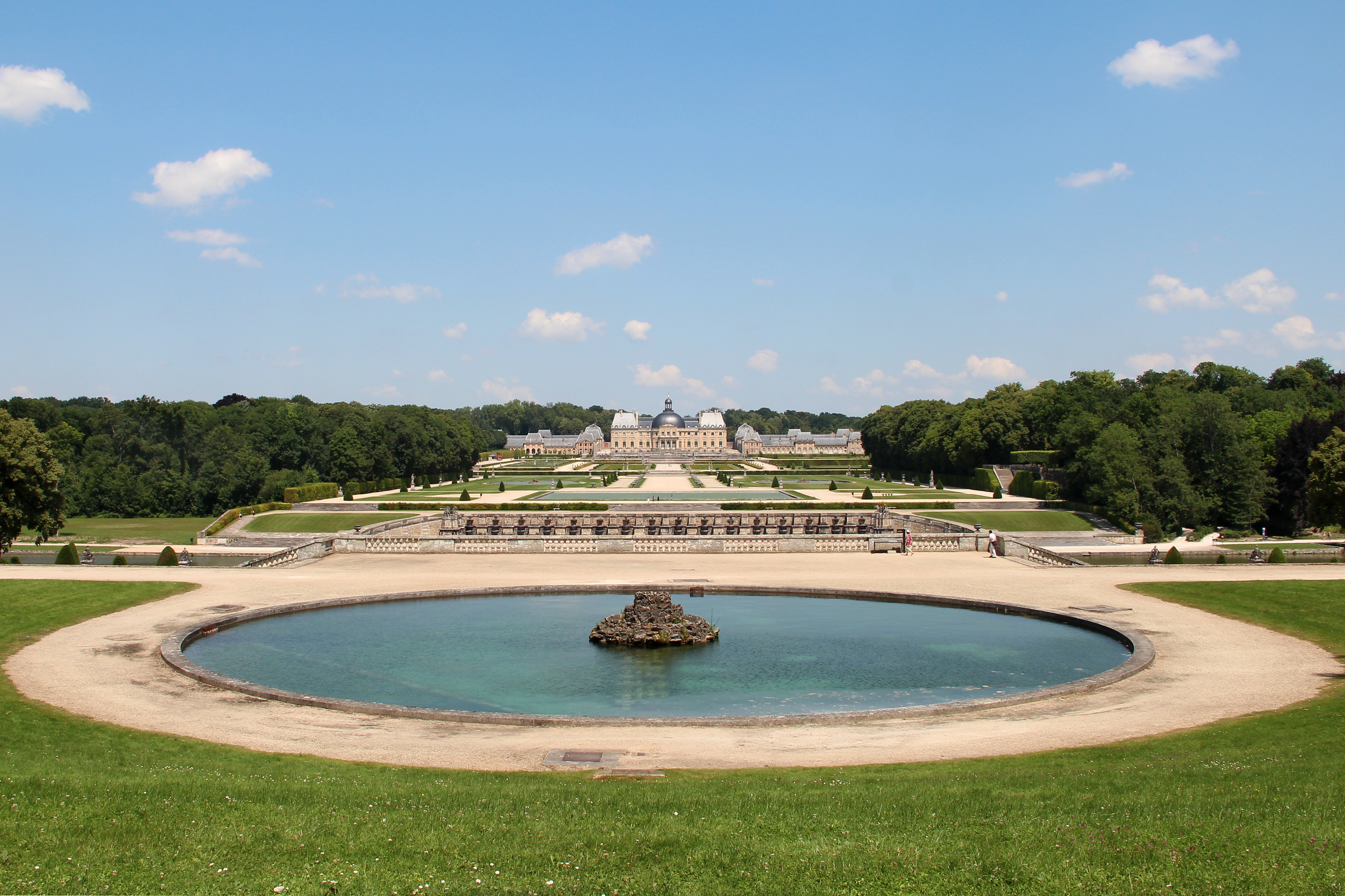
Vaux-le-Vicomte

André Le Nôtre's first major garden design was undertaken for Nicolas Fouquet, Louis XIV's Superintendent of Finances. Fouquet began work on the Château de Vaux-le-Vicomte in 1657, employing the architect Louis Le Vau, the painter Charles Le Brun, and Le Nôtre. The three designers worked in partnership, with Le Nôtre laying out a grand, symmetrical arrangement of parterres, pools and gravel walks. Le Vau and Le Nôtre exploited the changing levels across the site, so that the canal is invisible from the house, and employed forced perspective to make the grotto appear closer than it really is. The gardens were complete by 1661, when Fouquet held a grand entertainment for the king. But only three weeks later, on 10 September 1661, Fouquet was arrested for embezzling state funds, and his artists and craftsmen were taken into the king's service.

==== Versailles ====
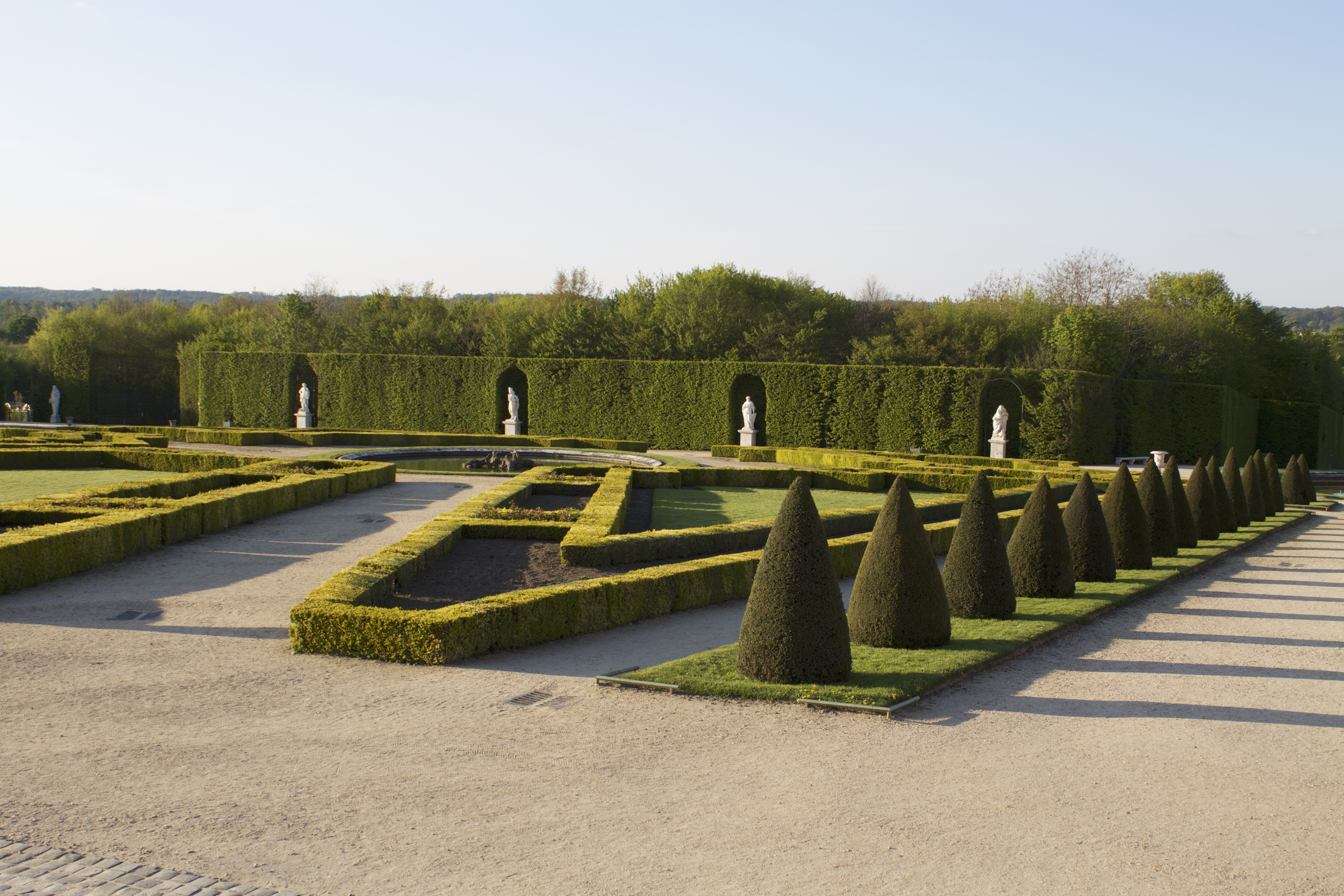
Gardens of Versailles

Plan view of the gardens of Versailles

From 1661, Le Nôtre worked for Louis XIV to build and enhance the garden and parks of the Palace of Versailles. Louis extended the existing hunting lodge, eventually making it his primary residence and seat of power. Le Nôtre also laid out the radiating city plan of Versailles, which included the largest avenue yet seen in Europe, the Avenue de Paris.

In the following century, the Versailles design influenced Pierre Charles L'Enfant's master plan for Washington, D.C. See, L'Enfant Plan.

=== Other gardens ===
==== France ====
In 1661, Le Nôtre was also working on the gardens at the Palace of Fontainebleau. In 1663 he was engaged at the Château de Saint-Germain-en-Laye, and the Château de Saint-Cloud, residence of Philippe I, Duke of Orléans, where he would oversee works for many years. Also from 1663, Le Nôtre was engaged at the Château de Chantilly, the property of the Prince de Condé, where he worked with his brother-in-law Pierre Desgots until the 1680s. From 1664 he was rebuilding the gardens of the Tuileries, at the behest of Colbert, Louis's chief minister, who still hoped the king would remain in Paris. In 1667 Le Nôtre extended the main axis of the gardens westward, creating the avenue which would become the Champs-Élysées. Colbert commissioned Le Nôtre in 1670, to alter the gardens of his own Château de Sceaux, which was ongoing until 1683.

==== Abroad ====
Blazon of André Le Nôtre

Le Nôtre's most impressive design other than Versailles is the gardens of Bicton Park Botanical Gardens in Devon, England which can still be visited today. In 1662, he provided designs for Greenwich Park in London, for Charles II of England. In 1670 Le Nôtre conceived a project for the Castle of Racconigi in Italy, and between 1674 and 1698 he remodelled the gardens of the Palace of Venaria, and the Royal Palace of Turin. In 1679, he visited Italy.

==== Final works ====
Between 1679 and 1682, he was involved in the planning of the gardens of Château de Meudon for François-Michel le Tellier, Marquis de Louvois, and in 1691 redid the garden of the Hôtel de Saint-Aignan in Paris.

His work has often been favorably compared and contrasted ("the antithesis") to the œuvre of Capability Brown, the English landscape architect.

== List of principal gardens by Le Nôtre ==
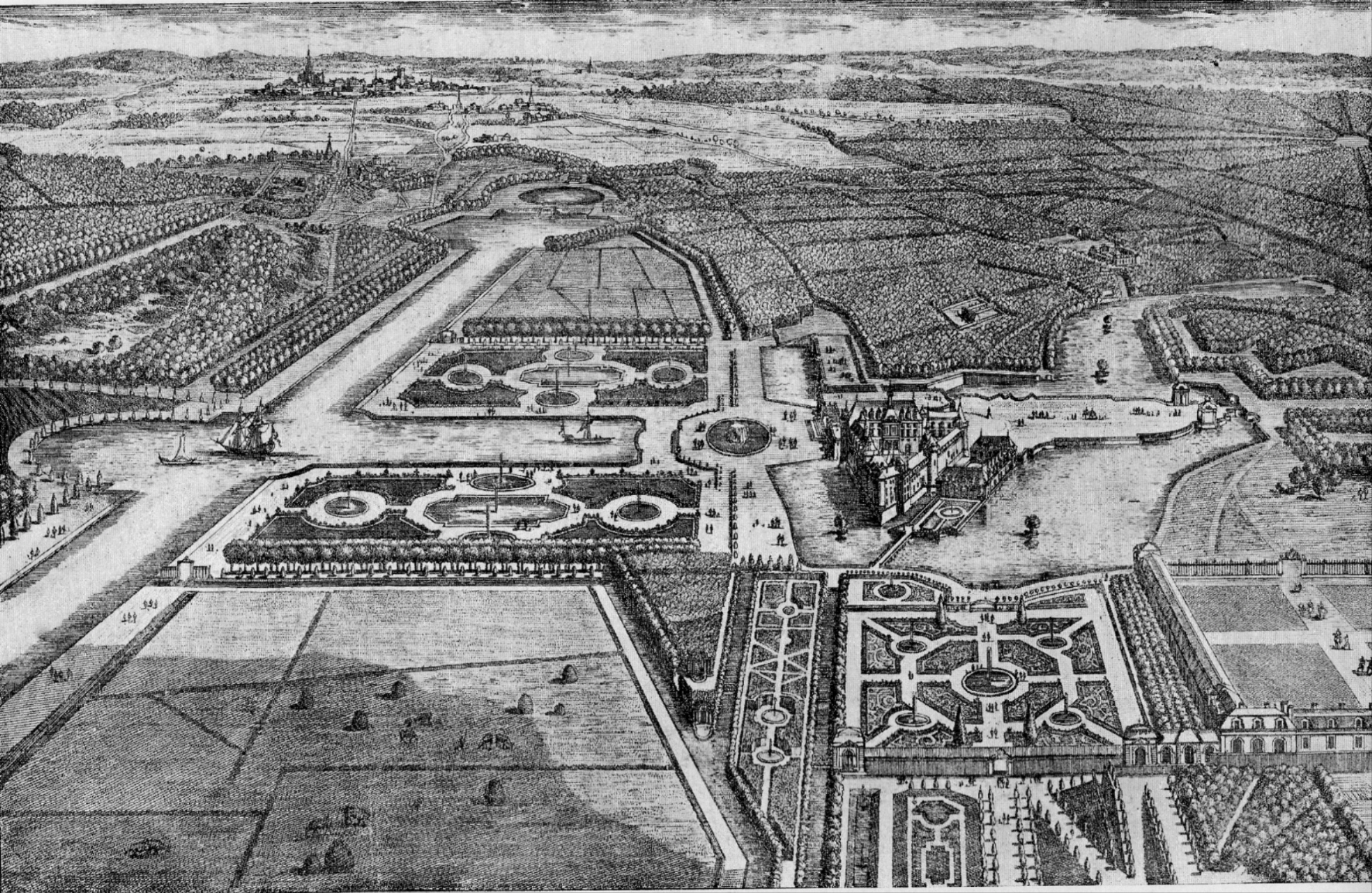
17th-century engraving of the gardens of the Château de Chantilly

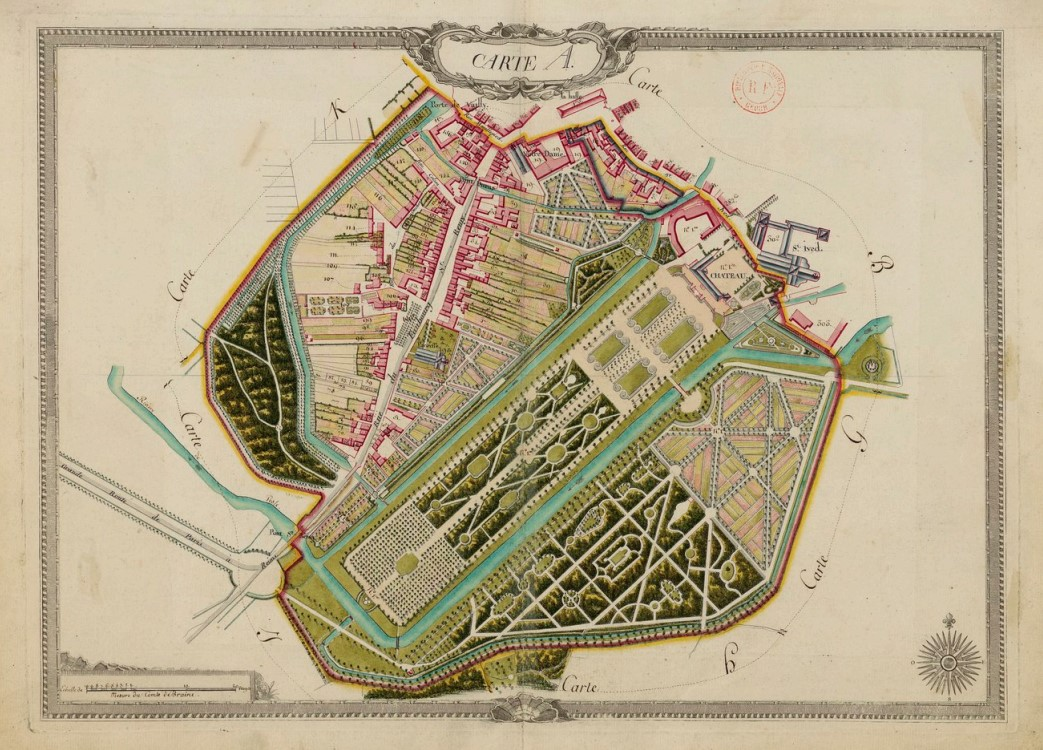
Plan of the Château de Braine and its gardens

- Gardens of Versailles, city plan of Versailles
- Gardens of Bicton Park Botanical Gardens
- Gardens of Vaux-le-Vicomte
- Gardens of the Château de Saint-Germain-en-Laye
- Gardens of the Château de Saint-Cloud (the château no longer stands but the gardens still exist)
- Gardens of the Palais des Tuileries
- Gardens of the Château de Sceaux
- Gardens of the Château de Fontainebleau
- Gardens of the Château de Chantilly
- Gardens of the Château de Bercy (demolished), Charenton-le-Pont
- Gardens of the Château de Braine (demolished, Braine, Aisne)
- Gardens of the Château de Chambonas
- Gardens of the Château d'Issy (demolished)
- Gardens of the Château de Chenailles

== In popular culture ==
André Le Nôtre was played by Matthias Schoenaerts in the 2014 film A Little Chaos.

== See also ==
- 17th-century French art
- Baroque architecture

French garden design history:

- Gardens of the French Renaissance
- French formal garden
- French landscape garden
