= Château de Lahamaide =

Castle in Wallonia, Belgium

Coordinates: 50°41′41″N 3°43′12″E

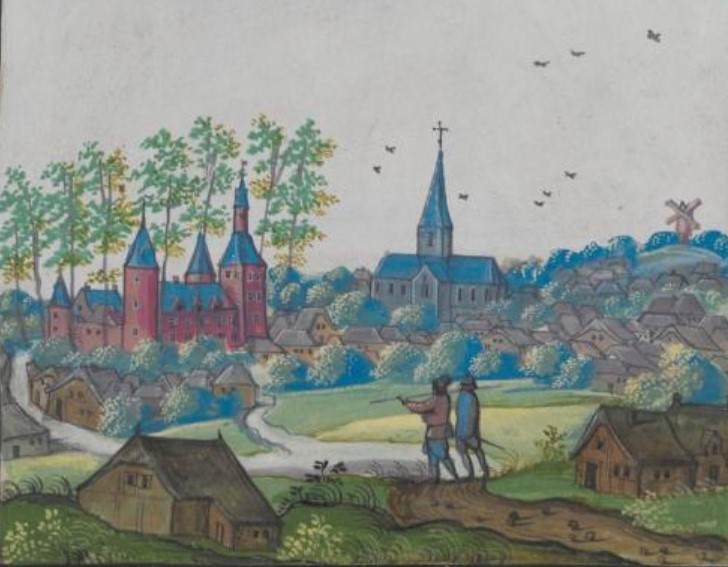
Château de Lahamaide around 1600 as depicted in the Albums de Croÿ

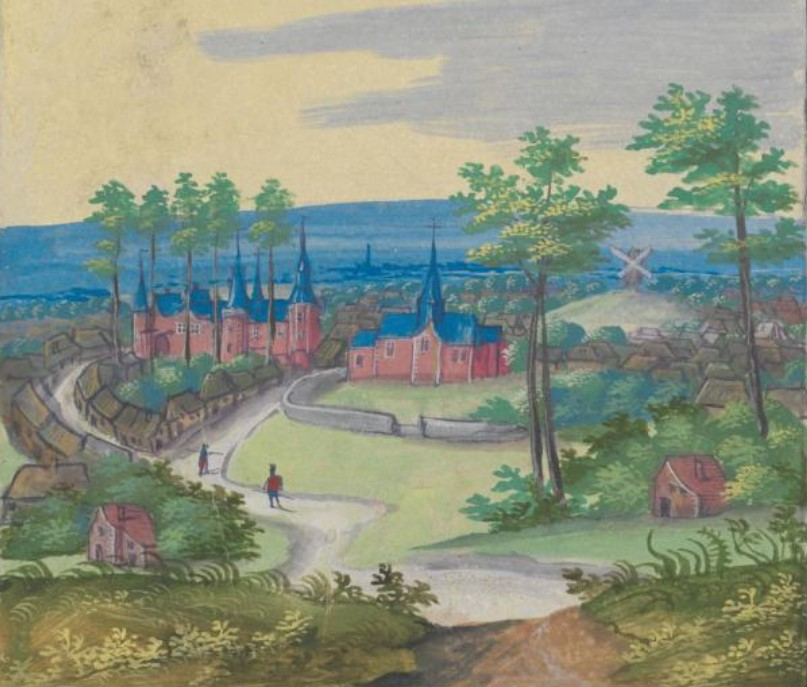
Second image of the Château de Lahamaide in the Albums de Croÿ

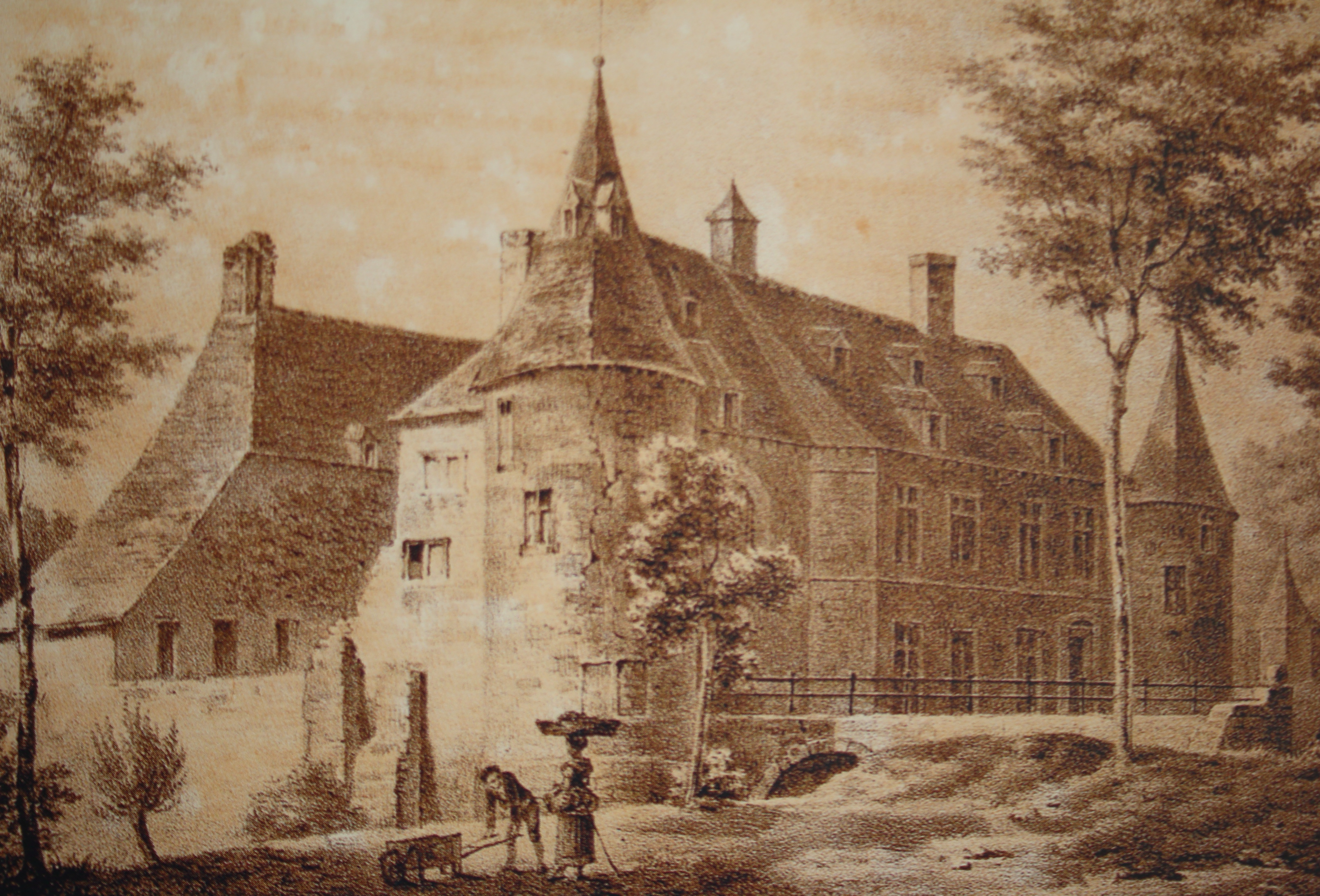
Château de Lahamaide depicted on a 19th-century lithography by Madou

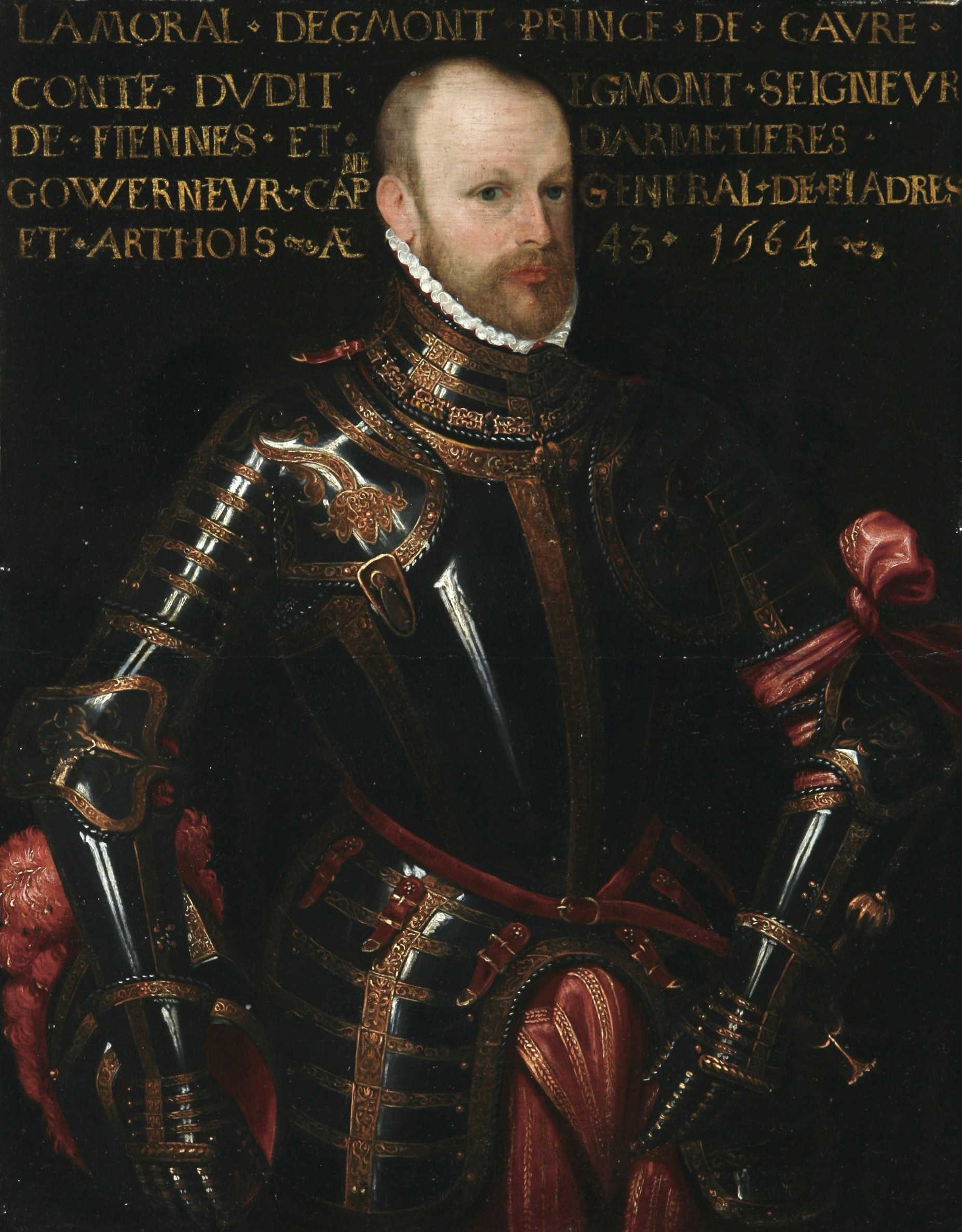
Lamoraal count of Egmont was born at the château on 18 November 1522.

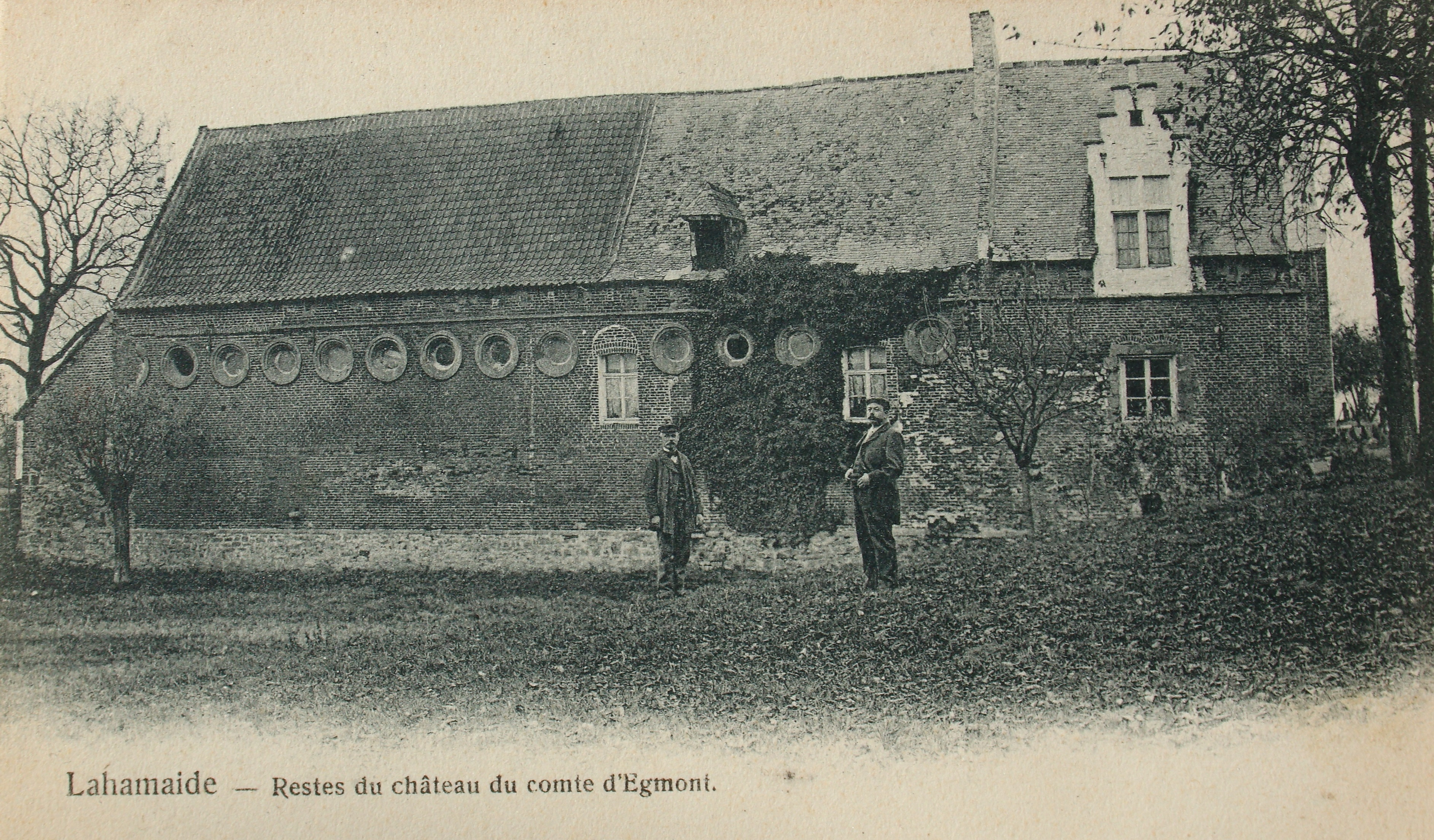
The stables are the only remains of the château de Lahamaide.

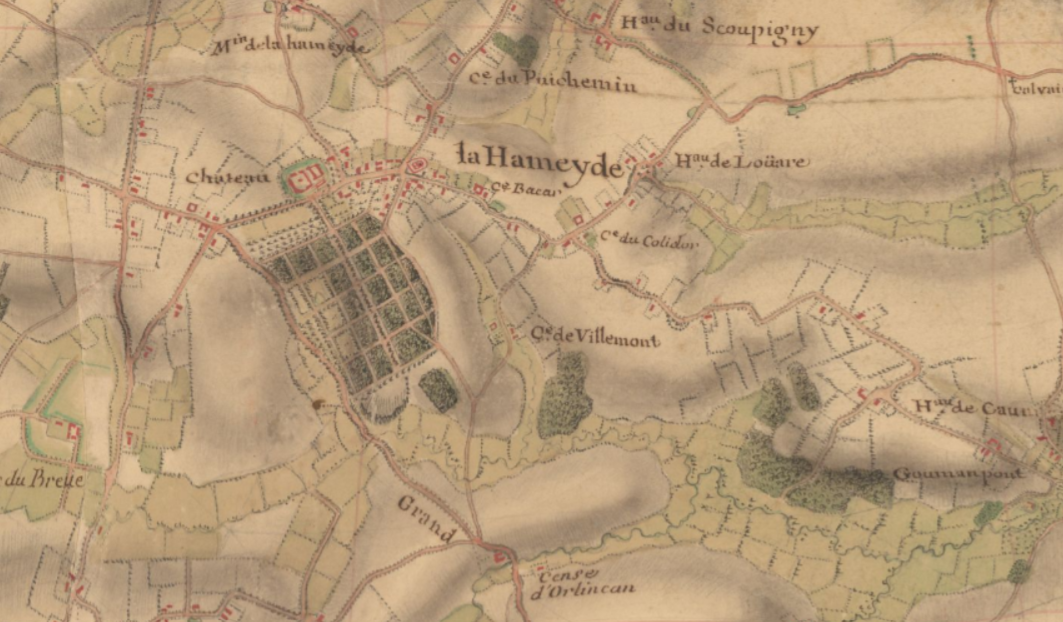
The château de Lahamaide and the park on the Villaret map around 1745

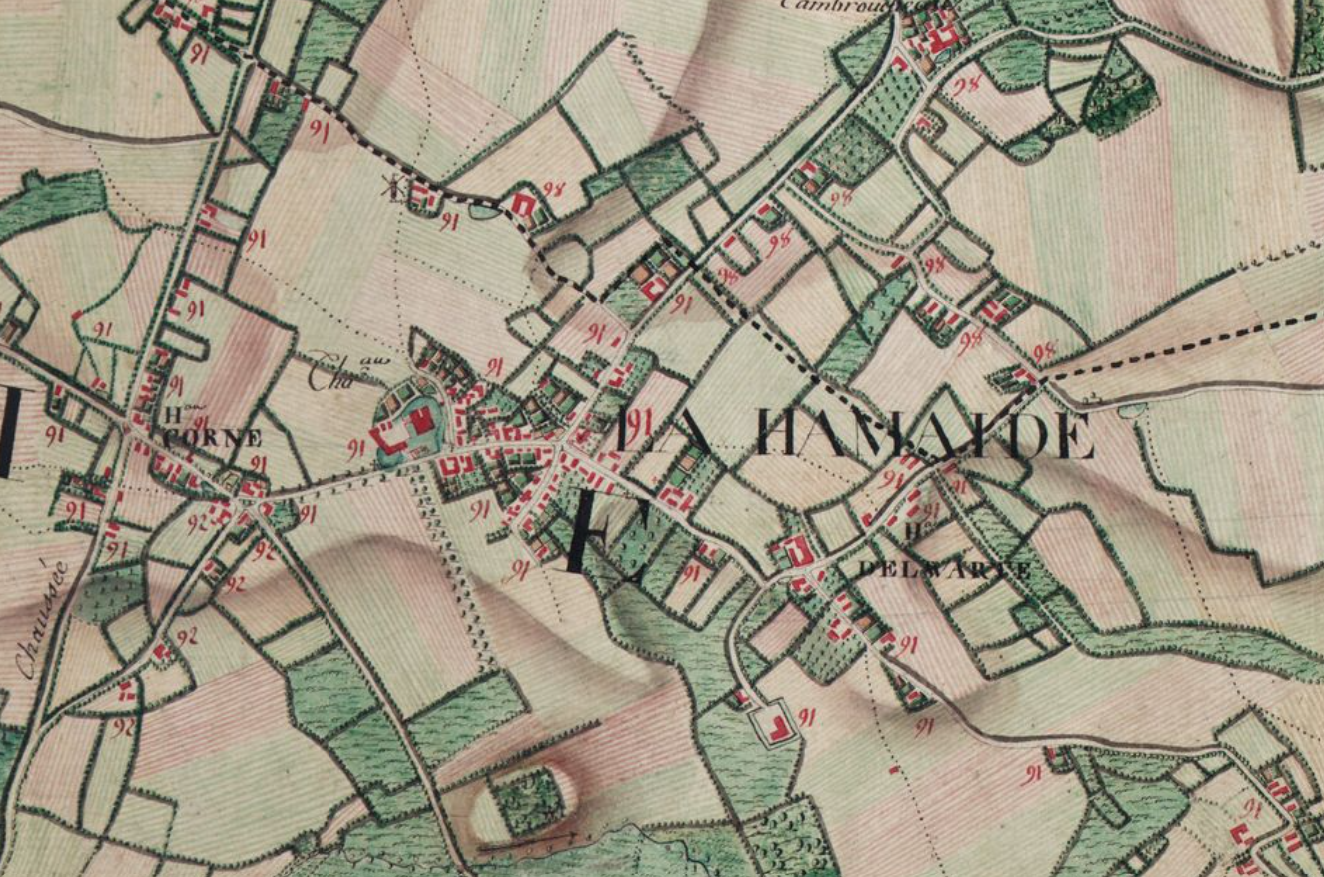
The château de Lahamaide Ferraris map around 1775

The Château de Lahamaide was a castle in Lahamaide in Hainaut, located in the municipality of Ellezelles, Belgium. It was the place of birth of Lamoral, Count of Egmont. Nowadays only the stables remain.

== History ==
=== House of Lahamaide ===
In the twelfth century, the first wooden castle was built, surrounded by a moat. The owners are known as the barons of Lahamaide. They became an important noble family within the county of Hainaut. At the start of the 15th century (before 1415) a stone castle was constructed.

=== House of Luxemburg-Fiennes ===
In 1485, Michel de la Hamaide, the last of his family, dies. His niece Maria de Berlaymont inherits the castle. In 1470 she was married to Jacques I of Luxemburg-Fiennes, lord of Zottegem. The castle thus falls into the hands of the house of Luxembourg-Fiennes (a branch of the house of Luxembourg). After them follow Jacques II and Jacques III. With the childless death of the latter, his assets pass to his sister Francisca of Luxembourg. And with her, the illustrious house of Egmond enters into the history of the castles of Lahamaide and Zottegem (the latter is now known as the Egmontkasteel).

=== House of Egmond or Egmont ===
The Egmond family is one of the principal noble families in the period of Burgundian and Habsburg rule over the Netherlands. They are named after the Dutch town of Egmond, province of North Holland, where their ancestral castle was located. Members of the family became duke of Geldern and Counts of Zutphen, Counts of Buren, and counts of Egmont. In 1516, Francisca of Luxembourg, countess of Gavere, marries John IV of Egmont, knight in the Order of the Golden Fleece. Together they have three children, including the illustrious Lamoral, who was born in the château of Lahamaide on 18 November 1522. Lamoral becomes member of the court of emperor Charles V, becomes the first prince of Gavere in 1553, and holds positions as Captain General of the Lowlands under Charles V, knight of the Golden Fleece. Also he was appointed as stadtholder of Flanders and Artois. However, Count of Horn and he are accused of "treason" and sentenced to death in 1568. Both were publicly executed on the Grand-Place/Grote Markt (Brussels' main square).

After the beheading of Count Lamoral in 1568, the Duke of Alba confiscated the Egmont estates. It was not until 1593 that the youngest son of Lamoral, count Charles II of Egmont, was able to recover part of his father's possessions, including the castles in Zottegem and Lahamaide. In 1600, he starts to renovate the château, enriching with a double moat, gardens with fountains and a park for hunting. The family continues to use the castle as their summer home until 1707, when count Procope François of Egmont dies and the family in male line becomes extinct.

=== House of Egmont-Pignatelli till present times ===
All property and titles of the Egmonts passed to Procopo Pignatelli, founder of the house Egmont-Pignatteli. He and his sons count Guido and Casimir no longer reside at the castles in Zottegem and Lahamaide, but prefer Paris and their summer residence Château de Braine in Braine, near Soissons, France. The castles in Zottegem and Lahamaide fall into disrepair due to a lack of money and inadequate renovations. After the French Revolution, the Pignatelli's possessions are confiscated and sold. In the course of the 19th century, the castle fell into disrepair. It was then sold to a lime burner who broke it down thoroughly. Now everything has disappeared except for the stables.

From 1979 to 1985, archaeological excavations took place under the direction of Professor Michel de Waha of the Université libre de Bruxelles. Excavations that focus in particular on the construction phases from the Middle Ages. Only three images of the castle are known, on the one hand a lithograph from the 19th century and on the other hand two images in the Albums de Croÿ. On the Villaret map from 1745 to 1748, the castle with its outer bailey and surrounding moats is clearly recognizable. On the south side, the gardens and park are geometrically strictly subdivided using continuous axes and transverse lanes. The Ferraris map from 1771 to 1778 also shows the castle, but it is clear that it has fallen into disrepair. The outer bailey no longer seems so large and the park has disappeared, only one axis remains.

== Bibliography ==
- Abbé Louis Meunier (1933). Lahamaide. Monographie historique. Ronse (Renaix).
- Michel de Waha (1979). "Le château dit "d'Egmont" à Lahamaide". Activités du SOS fouilles. 1: 139–142.
- Michel de Waha (1980). "Le château dit "d'Egmont" à Lahamaide". Activités du SOS fouilles. 2: 151–155.
- Michel de Waha (1982). "Lahamaide, château d'Egmont". Annales d'histoire de l'art et d'archéologie. 4: 124–125.
- Michel de Waha (1981). "Lahamaide, château d'Egmont". Annales d'histoire de l'art et d'archéologie. 3: 160–164.
- Michel de Waha (1983). Fortifications en sites fossoyés dans le nord du comté de Hainaut. Aspects archéologiques, historiques et monumentaux'. Brussel: Université libre de Bruxelles.
- Châteaux chevaliers en Hainaut au Moyen Age. Valenciennes: Credit Communal/ Musée des Beaux-Arts de Valenciennes. 1995. ISBN 2-87193-212-3.

== See also ==
Other palaces and castle of the Egmond family:

- Egmond Castle
- Egmont Palace in Brussels
- Egmont's castle in Zottegem
- Château de Braine
