= Château de Braine =

Château in Braine, Aisne, Picardy, France

Coordinates: 49.3532°N 3.5516°E

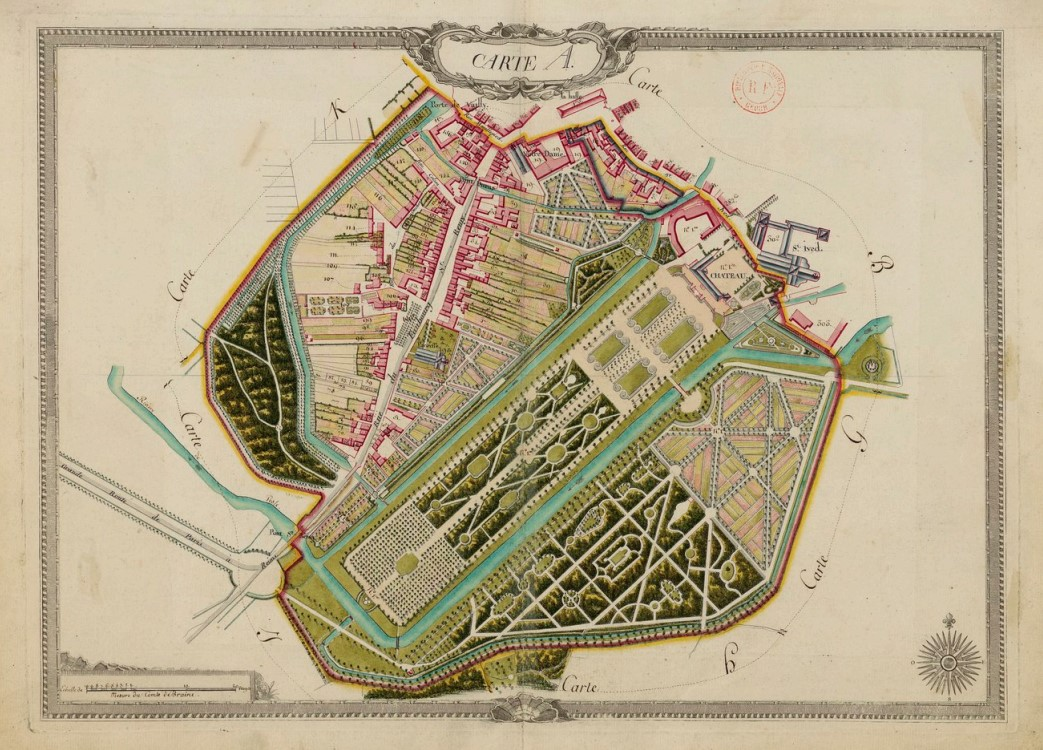
Plan of the Château de Braine and its gardens by André Le Nôtre around 1750–1760

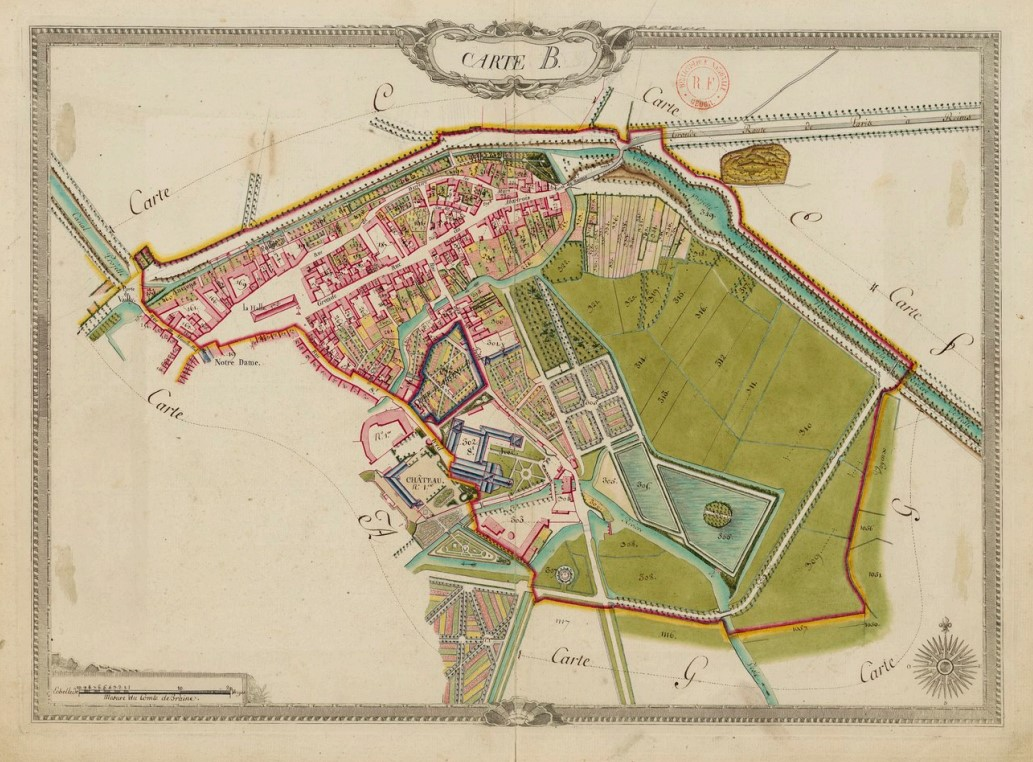
Plan of the Château de Braine and its surroundings around 1750–1760

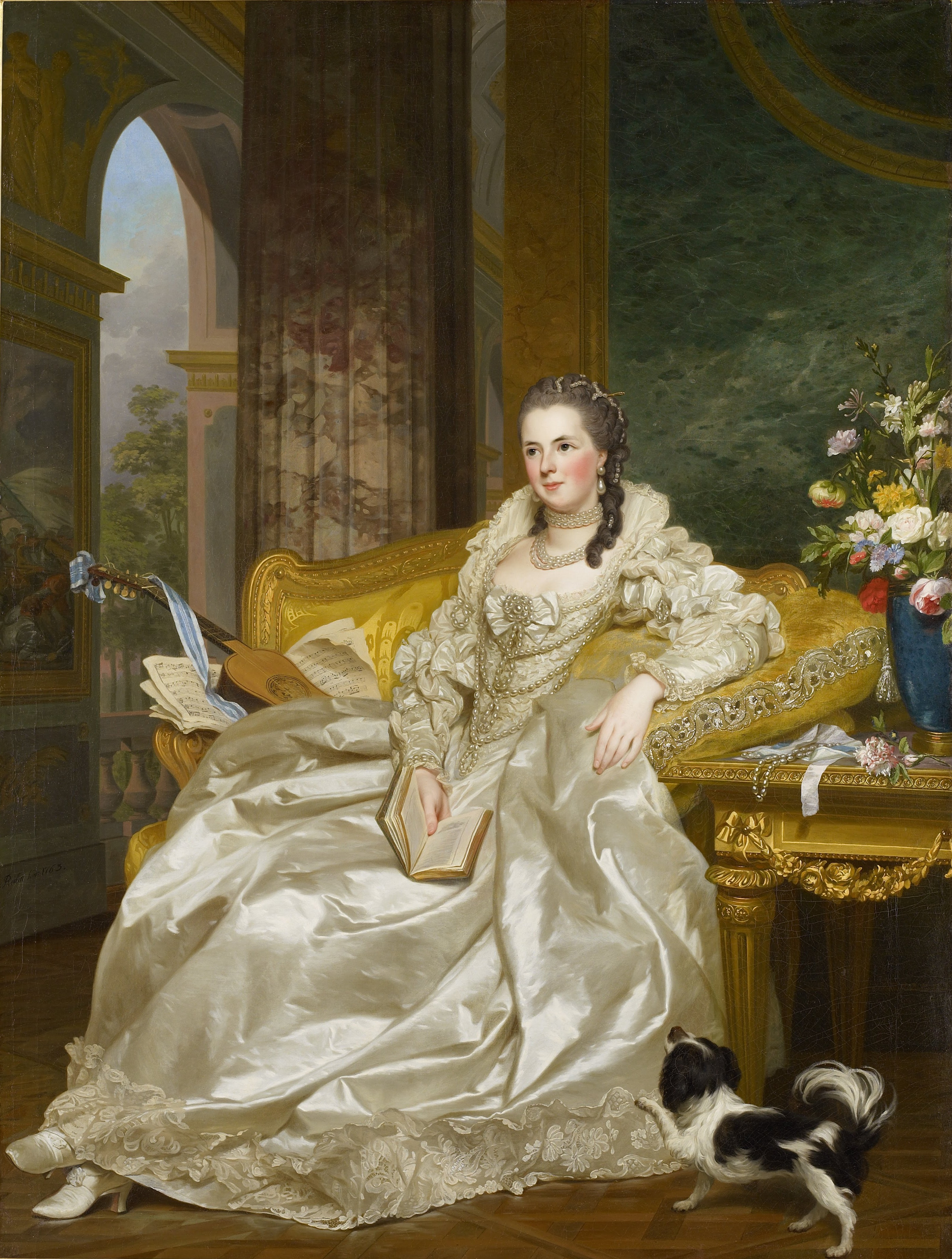
Countess Septimanie (Jeanne Sophie) d’Egmont-Pignatelli in Spanish costume by the Swedish artist Alexander Roslin

The Château de Braine was a château in Braine, Aisne, Picardy, France. It served as a country home for the counts of Egmont-Pignatteli, and its gardens were designed by André Le Nôtre.

== History ==
The first counts of Braine belonged to the House of Dreux, a cadet branch of the Capetian dynasty. Next to the Premonstratensian abbey of Saint-Yved de Braine, they constructed a medieval manor, the first château. Through inheritance the title and the manor passed to the house of Pierrepont, the counts of Saarbrücken, and the House de La Marck. In 1587, the medieval manor suffered a fire due to the religious wars. The house was replaced by a new 16th-century dwelling.

In the 17th century, ownership further changed by inheritance from family to family: to the Eschallart de la Boulaie and the Durforts. Around 1700, André Le Nôtre was engaged to design and lay-out the gardens.

In 1717, Henriëtte Julie de Durfot, countess of Braine, married count Procope Egmont-Pignatelli, prince of Gavere, scion of two illustrious house: the Egmond or Egmont and Pignatelli. The marriage changed the focus of the Egmont family from the Austrian Netherlands to France. They sold the Egmont Palace in Brussels to Léopold Philippe, 4th Duke of Arenberg, while the castles in Lahamaide and Zottegem fell into disrepair. The new centre of attention is now the hôtel d’Egmont at the Rue Louis-le-Grand 21 in Paris and the château in Braine, as the primary country home.

The château of Braine experiences its heyday under Procopo's son, count Casimir Egmont-Pignatelli, a lieutenant general in the French army and French ambassador to the king of Spain. Various plans were made to enlarge the château, but none are realized except a small pavilion housing a bathing apartment. Casimir was married to Jeanne Sophie du Plessis (also known as Septimanie), the daughter of Armand du Pless, Duke of Richelieu. Septimanie d’Egmont was a known salonist, who was in contact with Voltaire, Rousseau, and the Swedish king Gustav III, and invited them over to the château de Braine. In May 1771, Rousseau had a recitation from his forthright autobiographical work Confessions for the Egmonts and a few select friends in Braine. They were moved according to his own memories.

After the French Revolution, count Casimir emigrated to Germany in 1792, where he died in Brunswick in 1802. The estates of the Egmont-Pignatelli's in France and the Netherlands were confiscated. It was the start of the end of the château, whose furniture, panelling and decorative elements were sold. The west wing was ravaged by fire in 1798. And finally, the château was demolished in 1801.

After the Bourbon restoration in 1815, the park and estates in Braine were restored to the heir of the Egmont-Pignatelli family, the duke Luynes and Chevreuse, a descendant of Henriette Nicole d'Egmont-Pignatelli. However, its heyday was over.

Today, the only remains are the entrance gate to the château, dating from the 18th century, and the 16th-century vaulted cellars of the main building. Also, one can recognize where once the gardens were along the Vesle river. It is not possible to visit the site.

== Bibliography ==
- Maxime de Sars et Lucien Broche (1933). Histoire de Braine. imprimerie Delayane, La Charité-sur-Loire.
- Stanislas Prioux (1846). Histoire de Braine et de ses environs. librairie éditeur Dumoulin, Paris.
- Alexander Roslin and the Comtesse d'Egmont Pignatelli. Minneapolis Institute of Arts, Minneapolis. 2008. ISBN 978-0980048414.
- Buffenoir, Maximilien (1930). "Sur le pas de la Comtesse d'Egmont ou les beaux jours de Braine au XVIII siècle". Société archéologique, historique en scientifique de Soissons.
- Fournis, Fredric (2005). "Le château des comtes de Braine". AGIR-Pic.
- Fournis, Fredric (2010). "Les projets d'aménagement en de reconstruction du château des comtes de Braine au XVIIIe siècle". Quadrilobe. Histoire et patrimoine de Picardie. 3–4.

== See also ==
Other palaces and castle of the Egmond family:

- Egmond Castle
- Egmont Palace in Brussels
- Egmont's castle in Zottegem
- Château de Lahamaide
- Château de Braine
