= Egmont Palace =

Palace in Brussels, Belgium

- Palais d'Egmont (French); Egmontpaleis (Dutch)
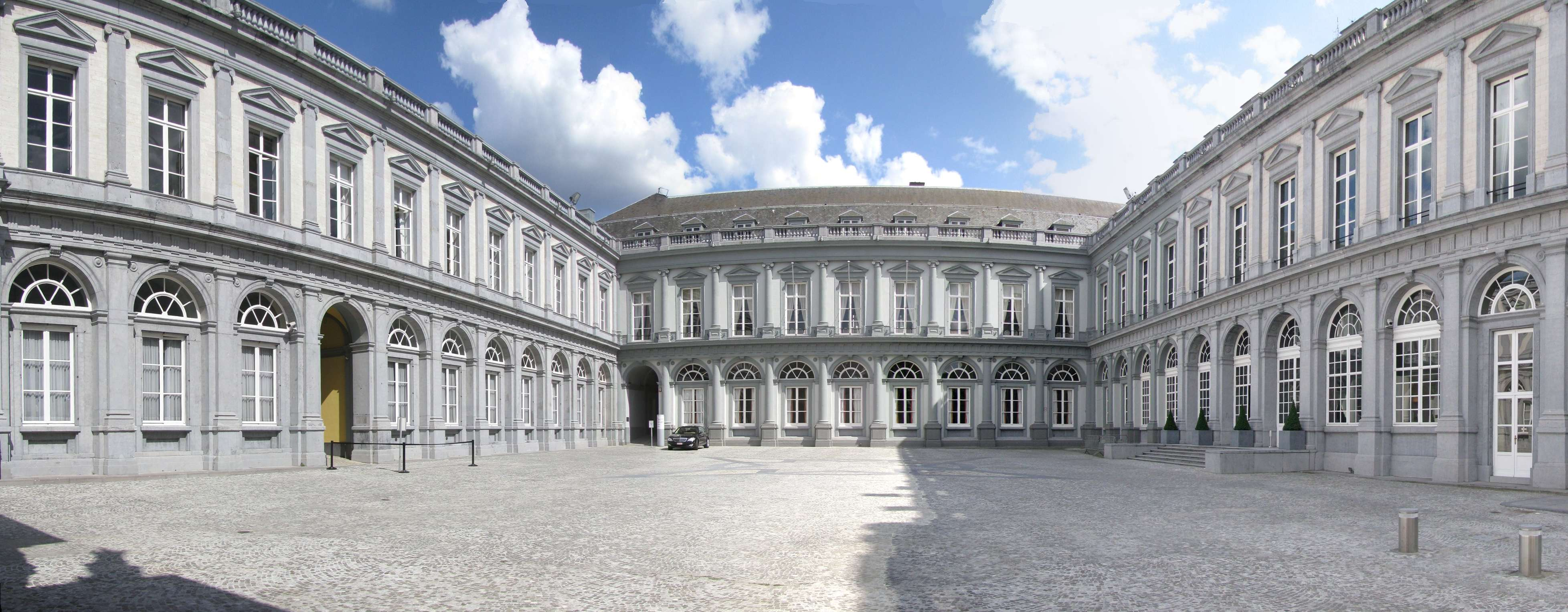
- View from the cour d'honneur (main courtyard) of the Egmont Palace
- Alternative names: Arenberg Palace

General information
- Type: Palace
- Architectural style: Neoclassical
- Location: Square du Petit Sablon / Kleine Zavelsquare 8, 1000 City of Brussels, Brussels-Capital Region, Belgium
- Coordinates: 50°50′19″N 4°21′28″E
- Current tenants: Belgian Ministry of Foreign Affairs
- Construction started: 1548
- Completed: c. 1910
- Client: Countess Françoise of Luxembourg and Count Lamoral of Egmont
- Owner: Belgian state

Design and construction
- Designations: Protected (11/09/1992)

Other information
- Public transit: 2 6 Porte de Namur/Naamsepoort

Website
- www.ccegmont.be/en

The Egmont Palace (French: Palais d'Egmont, pronounced [palɛ dɛɡmɔ̃]; Dutch: Egmontpaleis), also sometimes known as the Arenberg Palace (French: Palais d'Arenberg; Dutch: Arenbergpaleis), is a neoclassical palace in Brussels, Belgium. It was originally built between 1548 and 1560 for Countess Françoise of Luxembourg and Count Lamoral of Egmont, though its appearance was heavily modified in the 18th and 19th centuries. It was partly destroyed by fire in 1892, after which it was once again reconstructed. Nowadays, it is used by the Belgian Ministry of Foreign Affairs for receptions, as a guest house and conference centre.

The palace is situated in the Sablon/Zavel district (south-eastern part of Brussels' city centre), between the Rue aux Laines/Wolstraat and the Square du Petit Sablon/Kleine Zavelsquare.

== History ==
=== The Palace of Françoise of Luxembourg ===
The original Egmont Palace was built between 1548 and 1560 as a hôtel particulier in Flemish Gothic style for Countess Françoise of Luxembourg, Princess of Gavre and widow of Count John IV of Egmont, who in 1532 had acquired the land between the Rue aux Laines/Wolstraat and the Rue du Grand Cerf/Grotehertstraat on the highest part of the Sablon/Zavel. Nothing remains of this residence, which was called the Petit Hôtel d'Egmont ("Small Hotel of Egmont") or Hôtel de Luxembourg ("Hotel of Luxembourg").

Around 1560, her son, Count Lamoral of Egmont, had a new Flemish Renaissance-style residence, called the Grand Hôtel d'Egmont ("Grand Hotel of Egmont"), built next door, before he was executed on the orders of the Duke of Alba in 1568. Confiscated after his conviction, these properties were returned to the Egmont family in 1576. Originally, the two properties were separated by a street that led to the city walls and was located in the axis of the current Rue des Sablons/Zavelstraat. Françoise of Luxembourg obtained authorisation from the Court of Audits to close it. Later, a connecting wing was built on its site.

=== 18th- and 19th-century expansions ===
The palace's fabric was dramatically transformed in the 18th century, when these two properties gradually passed into the hands of the House of Arenberg. In 1729, Duke Léopold-Philippe d'Arenberg rented the Grand Hôtel d'Egmont, then, in 1737, the Petit Hôtel, which he acquired in 1738. After a first failed attempt in 1745, he also bought the Grand Hôtel in 1754, thus uniting the two properties once again. The Grand Hôtel then took the name of Hôtel d'Arenberg ("Hotel of Arenberg"), while the Petit Hôtel kept that of Egmont.

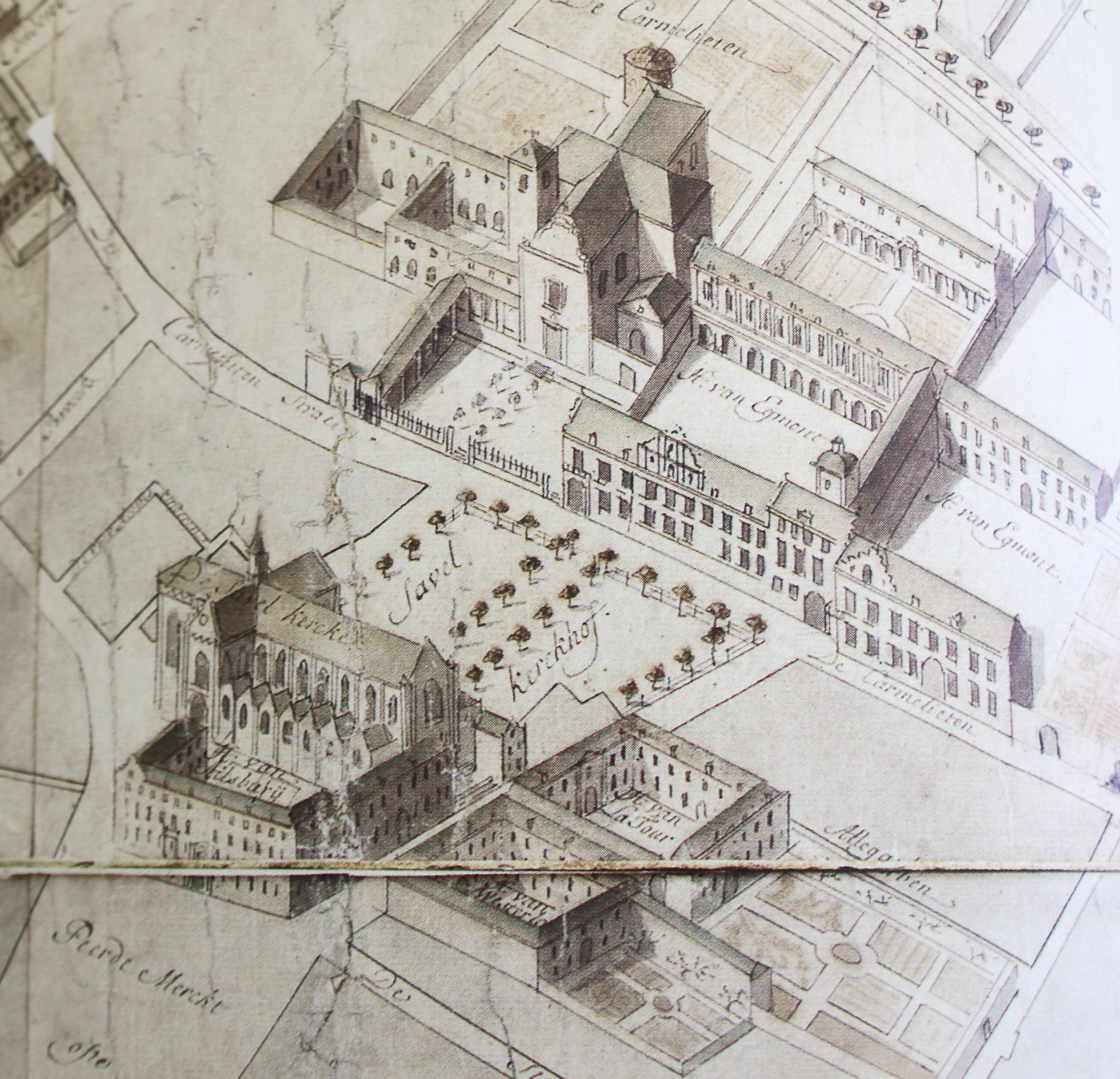
The Egmont Palace, c. 1750

Duke Charles Marie Raymond d'Arenberg, son of Léopold-Philippe, had major alterations carried out. The dilapidated façade and the tower of the Grand Hôtel were demolished and the duke entrusted the Italian architect Giovanni Niccolò Servandoni, an early advocate of neoclassicism, the care to build two buildings to the right of a main courtyard preceded by a monumental portal. The first one, clothed in a neoclassical style, was in harmony with the only part of the 16th-century palace that was preserved, the Italian Renaissance wing at the end of the main courtyard; the other, in Rococo style, was lower. Towards the Rue aux Laines, a neoclassical-style chapel was built in 1770, whose concave façade formed the junction with the Petit Hôtel.

After the occupation of the Austrian Netherlands by the French revolutionaries, the estates of the Duke of Arenberg experienced a few difficult years. The duke had to leave the country in 1794, and in his absence, the palace was placed in receivership. It housed various agents of the French administration, notably Bouteville, General Commissioner of the United Departments, who found the buildings in a deplorable state. Under Napoleon, Louis-Engelbert d'Arenberg recovered his property after joining the regime.

In the 19th century, Duke Prosper-Louis d'Arenberg commissioned major works. He entrusted the work to Tilman-François Suys, one of the most renowned architects of the time. He built the carousel in the neoclassical style in 1832, then extended the wing known as the "French Quarter", thus giving the cour du sanglier ("wild boar's courtyard") its current appearance. In 1835, the main courtyard's left wing was built on land belonging to the former convent of the Discalced Carmelites. This construction was first called the Petit Hôtel d'Arenberg ("Small Hotel of Arenberg").

=== Fire and reconstruction ===
On the night of 22 to 23 January 1892, the palace was devastated by a fire that destroyed the oldest part of the buildings—Françoise de Luxembourg's mansion, which dated back to the 16th century—the chapel and part of the main courtyard's right wing. Of the destroyed parts nothing remains, apart from a few Ionic columns, which have been placed in Egmont Park.

After the fire, the part on the Rue aux Laines completely changed appearance. The long wall that ran along it on the side of Egmont Park was demolished, and after the duke had ceded to the town a strip of land to enlarge it, he had twenty-six houses built there. The reconstruction of the palace's right wing between 1906 and 1910 was carried out by the architect Octave Flanneau in the same neoclassical style as the left wing built by Suys, giving it its current uniform appearance. It was at this time that the grand staircase of honour was integrated into the palace, inspired by the former Ambassadors' Staircase of the Palace of Versailles. This sumptuous copy, all in marble, welcomes personalities during certain major international political meetings held in Brussels.

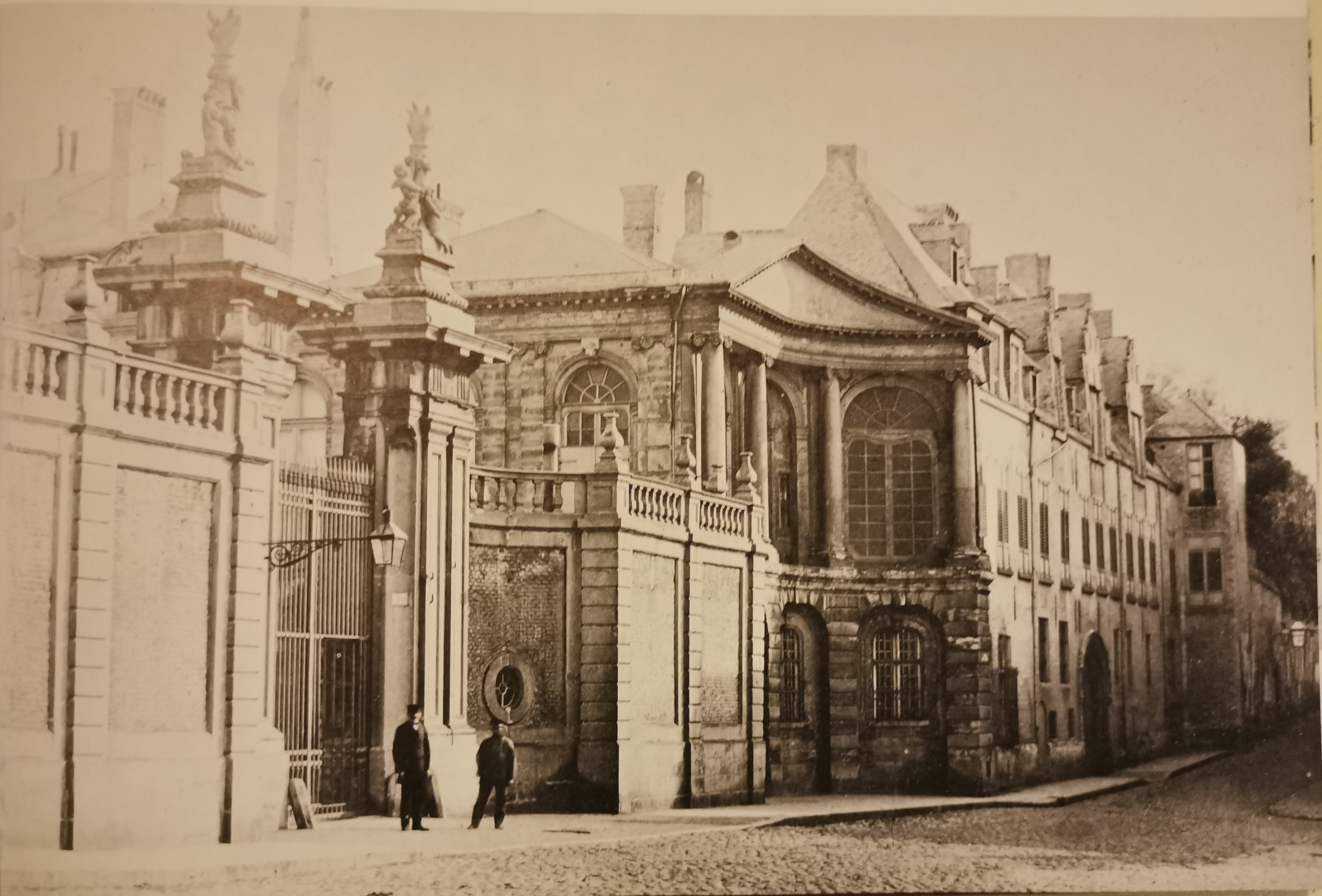
The oldest part of the Egmont Palace (right) before the fire of 1892

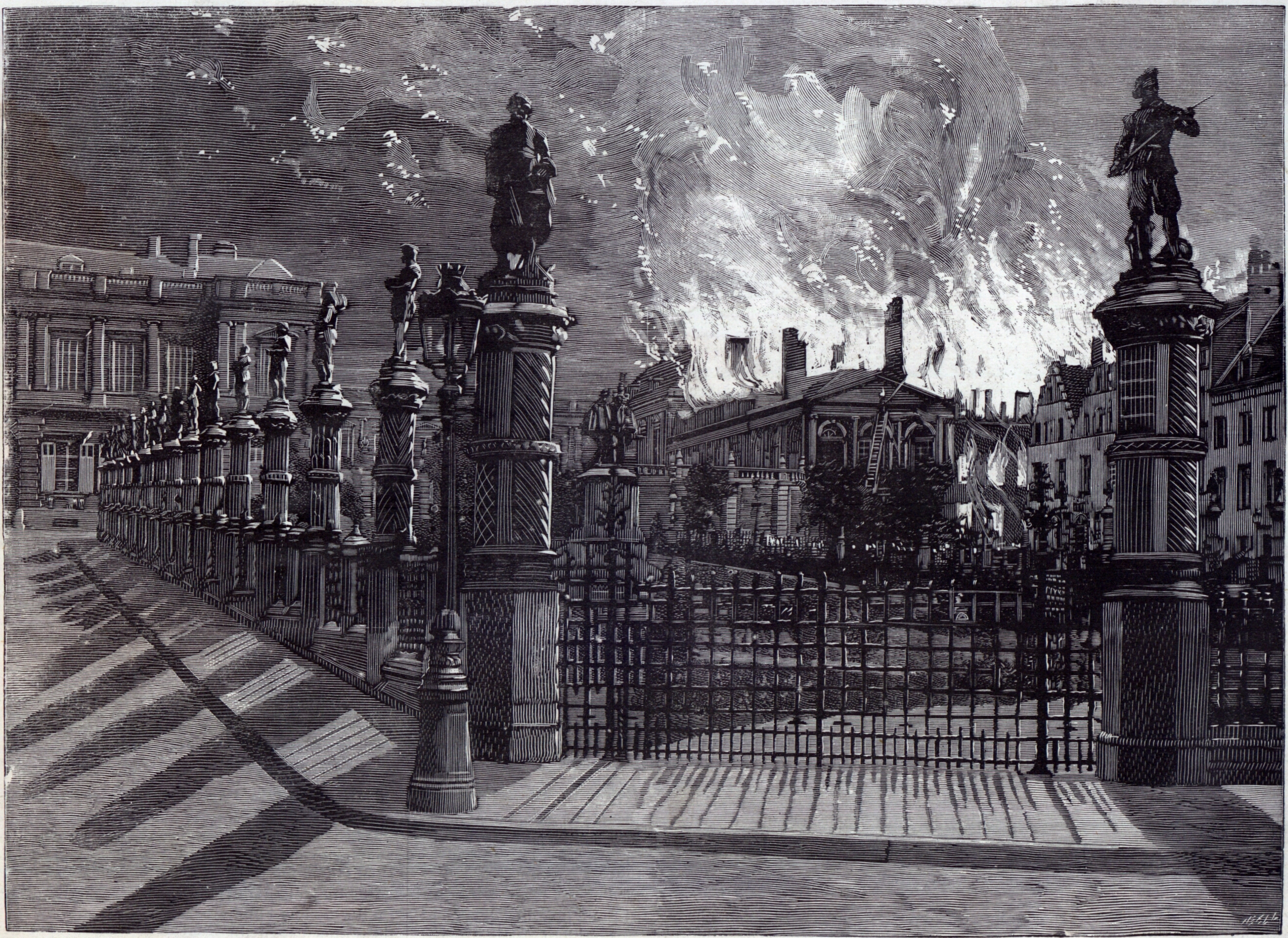
The Palace on fire seen from the Petit Sablon/Kleine Zavel, 22 January 1892

=== 20th and 21st centuries ===
The Egmont Palace was the host venue of the fencing events for the 1920 Summer Olympics in its garden. At the end of World War I, Engelbert-Marie d'Arenberg, who was a German national, feared that his assets in Belgium would be placed in receivership. On 31 October 1918, he therefore sold the Arenberg Palace to the City of Brussels. The deed of sale was the last official document on which the palace appeared under this name, which had overly German connotations. It then firmly took its current name of Egmont Palace. Major conferences took place then at the palace, such as the foundation of the League against Imperialism and Colonial Oppression in 1927. However, unable to meet the maintenance costs of the buildings, which had, moreover, been damaged by additional fires in 1927 and 1959, the City of Brussels sold the property to the Belgian state in 1964. The buildings were then assigned to the Belgian Ministry of Foreign Affairs, which charged the ambassador Luc Smolderen with their extensive restoration and redecoration.

In recent years, the palace has become an important venue for major diplomatic events in Brussels. The Treaty of Accession of Great Britain, Ireland, Norway and Denmark to the European Economic Community was signed at the palace in 1972, as was the Egmont Pact on the Belgian state reform during the second administration of then-Prime Minister Leo Tindemans in 1977. The Egmont Group, which was named after the palace, was also founded at a meeting of national financial intelligence units from several countries there in 1995. On 11 September 1992, the palace was listed as a protected monument by the Monuments and Sites Directorate of the Brussels-Capital Region. Nowadays, it is used for receptions and meetings by the Ministry of Foreign Affairs and hosts many events organised by the Royal Institute for International Relations (also known as the Egmont Institute).

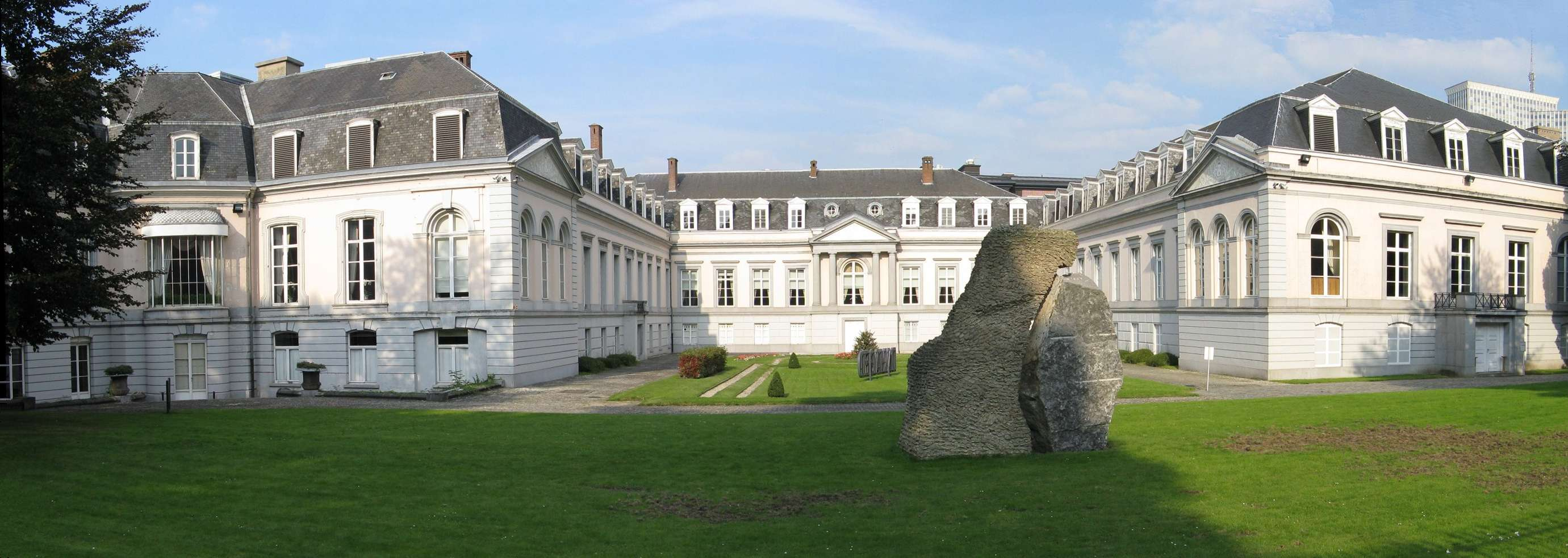
The courtyard seen from Egmont Park

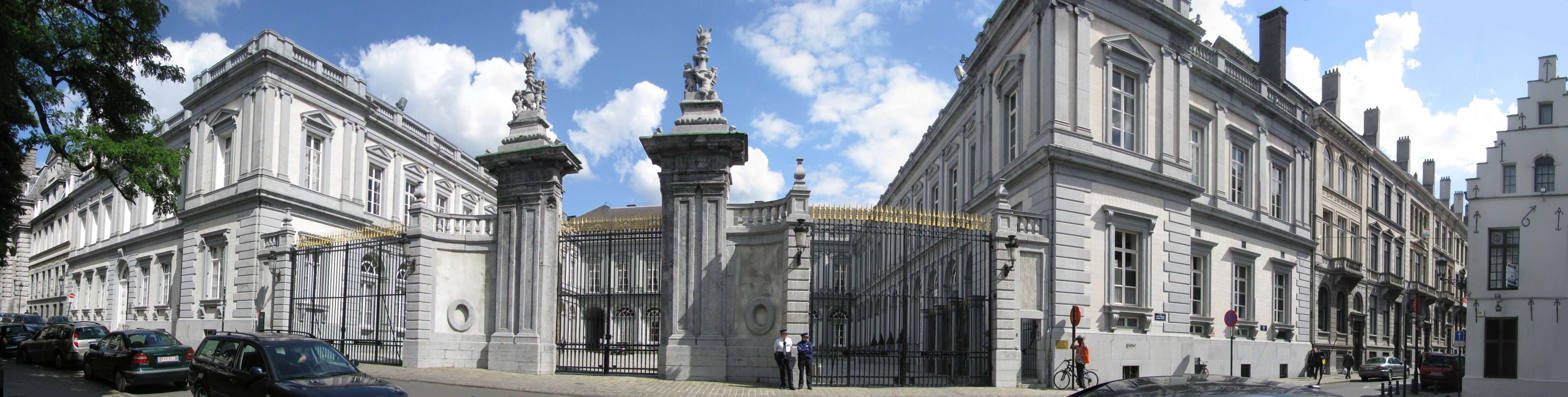
View of the building's façade from the street

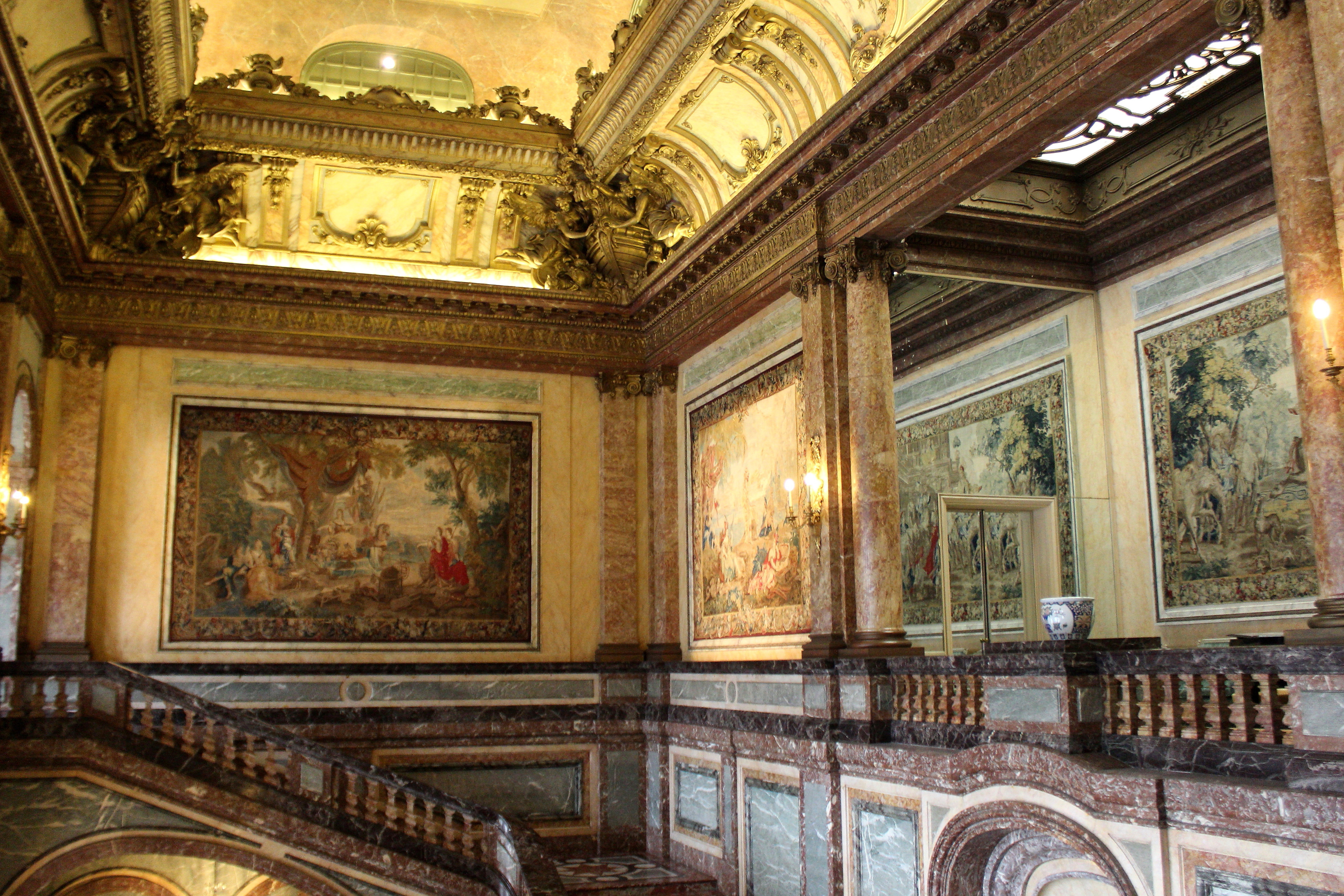
The main staircase

== See also ==
- List of castles and châteaux in Belgium
- Neoclassical architecture in Belgium
- History of Brussels
- Culture of Belgium
- Belgium in the long nineteenth century

Other palaces and castles of the Egmond family:

- Egmond Castle
- Egmont Castle in Zottegem
- Château de Lahamaide
- Château de Braine
