= Adolf III of Mark =

German royal

Adolph III of the Marck
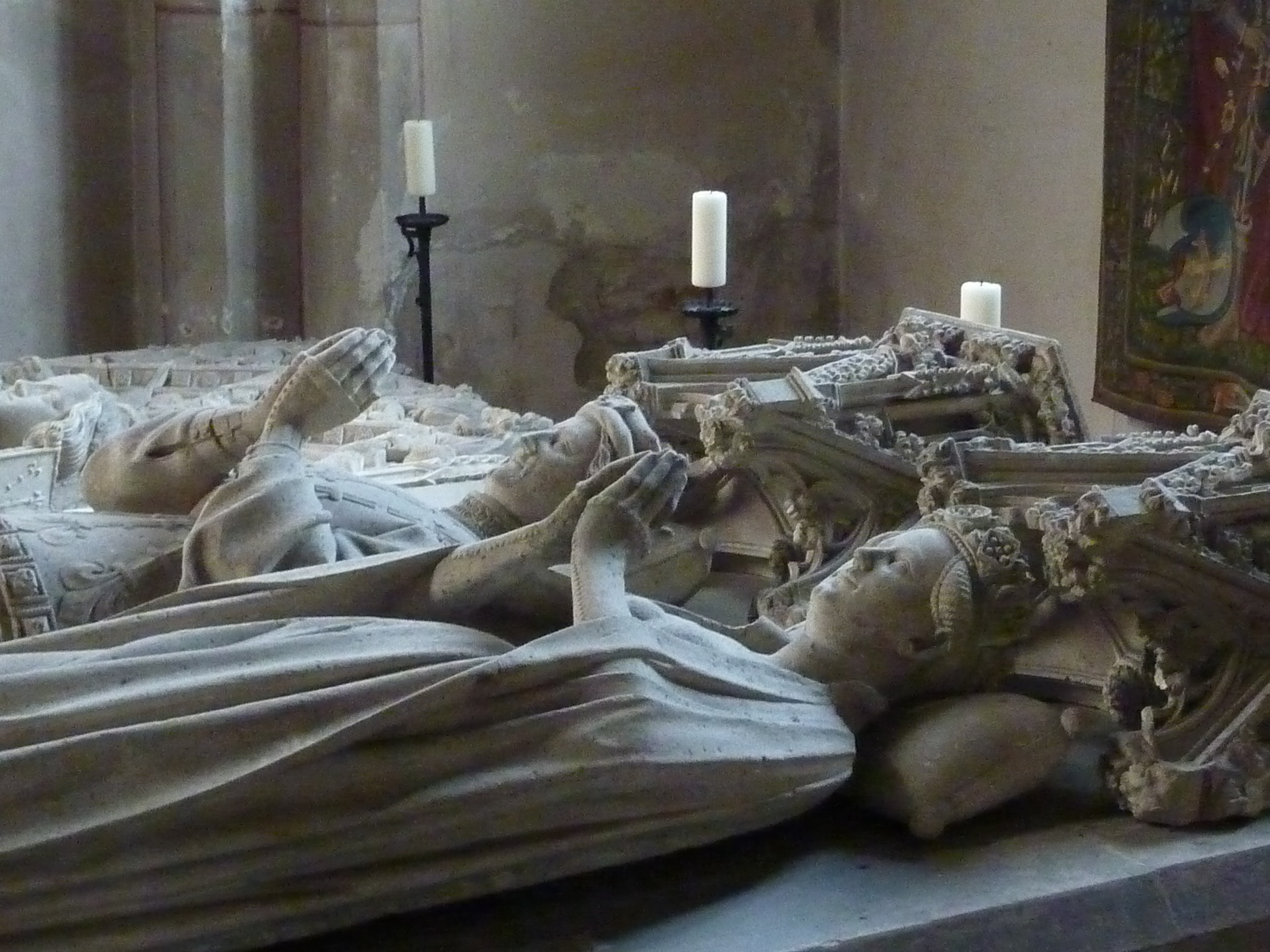
- Adolf III and Margaret, Stiftskirche in Kleve
- Born: c. 1334
- Died: 7 September 1394; Cleves
- Spouse: Margaret of Jülich
- Issue: Adolph I, Duke of Cleves; Dietrich IX, Count of Mark; Gerhard, Count of Mark; Margaret; Elisabeth
- House: House of La Marck
- Father: Adolph II of the Marck
- Mother: Margaret, Countess of Cleves

Adolph III of the Marck (German: Adolf III von der Mark; c. 1334 – 1394) was the Prince-Bishop of Münster (as Adolph) from 1357 to 1363, the Archbishop-Elector of Cologne (as Adolph II) in 1363, the Count of Cleves (as Adolph I) from 1368 to 1394, and the Count of Mark (as Adolph III) from 1391 to 1393.

== Life ==
=== Origins ===
Adolph was the second son of Count Adolph II of the Marck and Margaret of Cleves.

=== Reign ===
On 16 November 1357 Pope Innocent VI appointed him the Bishop of Münster. In 1362 he signed a contract with his uncle Bishop Engelbert III of the Marck of Liège whereby he would inherit Cleves in the likely event Count John of Cleves died childless. On 13 June 1363 he was appointed the Archbishop of Cologne against the favourite John of Virneburg, but by the end of the year had resigned from the position to focus on the County of Cleves, despite the fact that his short tenure was scandalous and ridden with controversy.

In 1368 he succeeded his uncle John of Cleves and could maintain his rule there through the support of Liège.

=== Marriage and issue ===
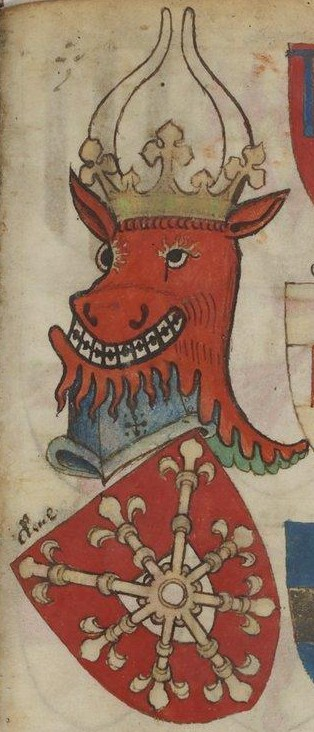
Arms of Cleves (c. 1380)

Arms of the Mark

In 1369 he married Margaret of Jülich, daughter of Gerhard VI of Jülich, Count of Berg and Ravensberg and had fourteen children, at least five of whom did not survive infancy.

- Adolph (1373–1448), his successor in Cleves and later also in Marck.
- Dietrich (1374–1398), his successor in Marck.
- Gerhard († 1461), de facto Count of the Marck, but not allowed to use the title.
- Margaret (1375–1411), married in 1394 Albert I, Duke of Bavaria († 1404)
- Elisabeth (1378–1439), married Reinold of Valkenburg († 1396) and Stephen III, Duke of Bavaria
- Engelberta († 1458), married Friedrich IV of Moers.

=== Later life and death ===
After his brother Engelbert III of the Marck died without heirs in 1391, Adolph inherited the Marck too. However, he gave Marck to his son Dietrich in 1393.

Adolph died in 1394 and was succeeded in Cleves by another of his sons, Adolph.

Cleves and Marck were reunited again four years later, when Dietrich died and was succeeded by Adolph IV.

Adolph of the Marck House of La Marck Born: ca. 1334 Died: 7 September 1394 in Cleves
Regnal titles
Catholic Church titles
Preceded by Wilhelm von Gennep	Archbishop-Elector of Cologne and Duke of Westphalia and Angria as Adolph II; 1363	Succeeded by Engelbert III of the Marck
Preceded by Louis II of Hesse	Prince-Bishop of Münster as Adolphus; 1357–1363	Succeeded by John I of Virneburg
Regnal titles
Preceded by John, Count of Cleves	Count of Cleves as Adolph I 1368–1394	Succeeded by Adolph II
Preceded by Engelbert III	Count of Marck as Adolph III; 1391–1393	Succeeded by Dietrich
