= House of La Marck =

Historical German noble family

- Coat of arms of the county, the Counts of the Mark, the House of Mark and, to this day, the city of Hamm.

- Coat of arms of the Counts of the Mark
- Parent house: Ezzonids → Berg
- Place of origin: Holy Roman Empire
- Founder: Adolf I, Count of the Mark
- Titles: List: Duke of Berg; Duke of Cleves; Duke of Guelders; Duke of Jülich; Count of Mark; Count of Ravensberg

The House of La Marck (German: Haus Mark; von der Mark) was an ancient German noble family, which from about 1200 appeared as the Counts of Mark.

== History ==
The family history started with Count Adolf I, scion of a cadet branch of the Rhenish Berg dynasty residing at Altena Castle in Westphalia. In the early 13th century Adolf took his residence at his family's estates around Mark, a settlement in present-day Hamm-Uentrop. Adolf had inherited the Mark fortress from his father Count Frederick I of Berg-Altena (d. 1198) together with the older county around Altena and began to call himself count de La Mark. Originally ministerialis of the Archbishops of Cologne in the Duchy of Westphalia, the family ruled the County of Mark, the sovereign state of the Holy Roman Empire, and, at the height of their powers, the four duchies of Jülich, Cleves, Berg and Guelders as well as the County of Ravensberg. Members of the family became bishops in the Prince-Bishoprics of Liège, Münster and Osnabrück, and Archbishops in Cologne. Collateral lines later became dukes of Bouillon, a title which was later inherited by the House of La Tour d'Auvergne, princes of Sedan, dukes of Nevers, counts of Rethel, etc.

The family went extinct in the male line in 1773 with the death of Louis Engelbert, Count de la Marck (1701–1773). The title of Count de la Marck was passed on to his grandson through his daughter, Louise-Marguerite de la Marck, who married Charles Marie Raymond, Duke of Arenberg, thereby transferring the title to the House of Arenberg.

== Notable members ==
- Adolph de la Marck (1288–1344), Prince-Bishop of Liège
- Adolph II of the Marck (died 1347), Count of the Marck, son of Engelbert I of the Marck
- Engelbert III of the Mark (1333–1391), Count of the Marck, son of Count Adolph II
- Adolf III of the Marck (c. 1334–1394), Prince-Bishop of Münster, later was Archbishop-Elector of Cologne, later was Count of Cleves, later added Count of the Marck
- Engelbert de la Marck (1304–1368), Prince-Bishop of Liège, later was Archbishop-Elector of Cologne
- William I de La Marck (1445–1486), assassinated a Prince-Bishop of Liège, causing a civil war in the prince-bishopric
- Érard de La Marck (1472–1538), nephew of William I, was prince-bishop from 1506 till 1538.
- Robert II de la Marck, nephew of William I, was Duke of Bouillon, seigneur of Sedan and Fleuranges.
- Robert III de la Marck (1491–1537), son of Robert II, was Marshal of France in 1526 and historian.
- Robert IV de la Marck (1520–1556) was Duke of Bouillon and Prince of Sedan, and Marshal of France in 1547.
- William II de la Marck (1542–1578) was admiral of the Gueux de mer, the so-called 'sea beggars' who fought in the Eighty Years' War (1568–1648). He was the great-grandson of William I de la Marck.
- Anne of Cleves, 4th wife of King Henry VIII of England, was a member of this house, daughter of John III.

In 1591 the heiress of one of the collateral lines of the family, Charlotte de la Marck, was married to Henri de La Tour d'Auvergne, Marshal of France. In 1594 Charlotte died without issue, and her claims to Bouillon passed to her husband.

- Louis Pierre Engelbert, Comte de la Marck (1674–1750)
- Louis Engelbert, Comte de la Marck (1701–1773) He was the last male descendant of the Counts de la Marck, so his title Comte de la Marck was passed on to his grandson through his daughter, Louise-Marguerite, who married Charles Marie Raymond of Arenberg.
- Auguste Marie Raymond, Comte de la Marck (1753–1833)

=== Simplified genealogy ===
Genealogy of the House of Berg in Cleves, Julich, Mark and Berg

House of Berg

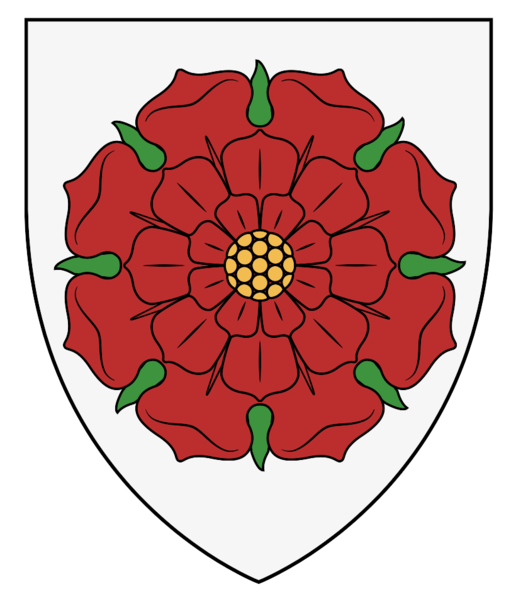
COUNT OR DUKE OF BERG	COUNT OR DUKE OF CLEVES	COUNT OR DUKE OF JŰLICH	ISENBERG/LIMBURG	COUNTS OF THE MARK	COUNTS OF RAVENSBURG	COUN OR DUKE OF GELDERLAND
Herman I Count Palatine of Lorraine; 985–996	Otto II; Emperor; 973–983
Adolf of Lorraine	Ezzo; Count Palatine of Lorraine; 996–1034 ancestor of Ezzonids	Mathilde d. 1025
Adolf	Richeza d. 1063	Mieszko II; Duke of Poland; 1025–1031; 1032–1034
Adolf I Count of Berg; 1077–c.1082	Casimir I the Restorer; Duke of Poland; 1034, rebellion 1038/40–1058
Adolf II of Berg; Count of Berg c.1082–c.1090	House of Wassenberg
Adolf III of Berg; Count of Berg c.1090–1106	Gerard I Flamens(ca. 970 - † bef. 1042)	Rütger I Count of Cleves d.<1092 House of Wassenberg
Adolf IV of Berg; Count of Berg; 1106–1161 or	Bruno II von Berg; Archbishop of Cologne; 1131–1137	Counts and dukes of Guelders	Arnold; Count of Cleves (<1092–c.1147)
Engelbert I Count of Berg; 1161–1189	Friedrich II of Berg; Archbishop of Cologne; 1156–1158	Adolf V d. 1148 (at Damascus)	Bruno III of Berg; Archbishop of Cologne; 1191–1193 d. 1196/1200	Eberhard I, Count of Berg-Altena (and IV); 1140 – 1180 eastern part of Berg becomes c. of Altena	Dietrich III; Count of Cleves c.1147–c.1172
Adolf VI; Count of Berg; 1189–1218	Engelbert II the Holy; Archbishop of Cologne; 1216–1225	Walter of Hennebach d.<1172	Arnold of Altena (1166 - 1209) 1st count of Isenberg, ancestor of counts of Limburg Hohenlimburg and Broich	Adolf of Altena (1168 - 1220) Archbishop of Cologne, 1193 - 1205, 1212 - 1214	Friedrich I of Altena (1173–1198) count of Berg-Altena, which renamed C. of Mark, ancestor of House of La Marck	Dietrich IV; Count of Cleves (1172–1193)
Irmgard of Berg d.1248	Henry IV (Arlon); Duke of Limburg; 1226–1246; 1/2 br. was Henry V, Count of Luxembourg anc. of Imperial House of Luxembourg	Eberhard d. 1218	Eberhard II (born 1180, died 1209) count of Altena and Isenberg	Frederick of Isenberg (1193 – 1226) attained re murder of Archb. of Engelbert II of Cologne	Dietrich III, Bishop of Münster (< 1180 - 1226)	Engelbert of Altena-Isenberg (< 1200 - 1250); B. of Osnabruck (1224-dep. 1226 for Engelbert II of Berg's assassination, rehab. 1238-1250)	Adolf I, Count of Mark (1194? - 1249)	Dietrich V Count of Cleves; 1193–1260
Adolf VII (1220 † 1259); Count of Berg	Waleran IV († 1279); Duke of Limburg	William III, Count of Jülich; 1207-1219 heir of uncle William II	Dietrich I of Isenberg before 1215–1301; 1st Count of Limburg (Counts of Limburg Hohenlimburg and Broich)	Friedrich of Altena (< 1220 - > 1243); C. of Limburg-Isenberg	Engelbert I, Count of Mark(d. 1277); C. of the Mark, 1249, C. of Altena, 1269	Otto, (1212-1269) C. of Altena	Dietrich VI; Count of Cleves; 1260–1275
Ermengarde († 1283)	Reginald I Count of Guelders (Wassenberg)	William IV, Count of Jülich (c. 1210 – 1278)	Johann of Isenberg-Limburg (< 1246 - < 1277)	Eberhard, Count of Mark (c. 1255–1308)	Dietrich VII (1256–1305); Count of Cleves,(1275–1305)
Adolf VIII of Berg († 1296) Count of Berg	William I († 1308) Count of Berg	Henry of Windeck († 1292)	Walram, Count of Jülich (1240/45 – 1297)	Gerhard V, C. of Jülich (bef 1250 – 1328), count 1297	from here desc. LIMBURG-STIRUM (see below)	Engelbert II, Count of Mark (1275 – 1328)	Adolf II (bishop of Liège) (1288 – 1344)	Dietrich VIII (c. 1291 – 1347); Count of Cleves (1311–1347)	Otto, Count of Cleves (1278 – 1310); Count of Cleves (1305–1311)	John (1293-1368); Count of Cleves (1347–1368)
Adolf IX of Berg († 1348) Count of Berg	Margaret of Berg-Windeck d.< 1339 m. Otto IV, Count of Ravensberg	Walram; Archbishop of Cologne; 1332–1349	William; V as count, I as margrave & duke (c. 1299 – 1361)	Eberhard I (d. about 1378), Count of Arenberg see below House of Marck-Arenberg/Bouillon/Lummey	Engelbert (1304–1368), Prince-Bishop of Liège 1345–1364, Archbishop of Cologne 1364–68	Adolf II, Count of Mark (d.1347)	Margaret of Cleves, Countess of the Marck (c. 1310 – after 1348)
Margaret of Ravensberg	Gerhard VI count of Berg, Ravensberg	William VI; II duke of Jülich ∞ Maria, Duchess of Guelders	Engelbert III (1333–1391), C. of the Mark, 1347	Adolf III (1334–1394), Absp. of Cologne, 1363-64, C. of Cleves, 1368
William VII of Jülich, 1st Duke of Berg duke of Berg, count of Ravensberg	William duke of Guelders, III of Jülich ∞ Katherine of Bavaria	Reinald IV duke of Guelders, Jülich	Joanna of Jülich ∞ John V lord of Arkel	Adolph I (1373–1448), his successor in Cleves, 1394 and also in Marck, 1398. Duke of Cleves, 1417	Dietrich (1374–1398), his successor in Marck.	Gerhard († 1461), de facto Count of the Marck, but not allowed to use the title.
Adolf (c. 1370 – 1437); Count of Ravensberg, 1395-1403; Duke of Berg, 1408; Duke of Jülich, 1423	William VIII (c. 1380 – 1428) count of Ravensberg, 1403	Marie of Harcourt (daughter of John VI count of Harcourt)	Maria van Arkel ∞ John II lord of Egmond	John I (1419–1481); Duke of Cleves, 1448; Count of the Mark, 1448/1461	Elizabeth of Nevers, daughter of John II, Count of Nevers(Valois-Burgundy)	Adolph of Cleves, Lord of Ravenstein (1425–1492) m. 1453, to Beatrice of Portugal
Rupert (d. 1431)	Gerhard VII duke of Jülich-Berg, count of Ravensberg	Arnold duke of Guelders; HOUSE OF EGMONT	John II (1458-1521); Duke of Cleves & Count of the Mark, 1521	Engelbert, Count of Nevers (1462-1506); Count of Nevers, 1491upon death of his maternal grandfather John II, Count of Nevers	Philip of Cleves (1467–1505); Bishop of Nevers, Amiens and Autun
William; IV duke of Jülich-Berg, count of Ravensberg ∞ Sibylle of Brandenburg
Maria of Jülich-Berg	John III (1490-1539); Duke of Cleves & Count of the Mark, 1511; Duke of Jülich & Berg, Count of Ravensberg, 1521; HOUSE OF LA MARCK	Adolf (1498–1525), appointed by his father's cousin Philip of Cleves, Lord of Ravenstein and Wijnendale, as his successor, but died before Philip did in 1528	Charles II, Count of Nevers (d.1521)m.Marie of Albret, Countess of Rethel
Sibylle d.1554	John Frederick I the Magnanimous; Elector of Saxony; 1532–1547 d.1554	Anne of Cleves d.1557	Henry VIII; King of England; 1509–1547; King of Ireland; 1541–1547	William I the Rich; Duke of Cleves–Jülich– Mark–Berg– Ravensberg; 1539–1592	Maria of Austria d.1581 d. of Ferdinand I, Holy Roman Emperor	Francis I Count of Nevers, 1521-39; Duke of Nevers, 1539-62
John William; Duke of Cleves–Jülich– Mark–Berg– Ravensberg; 1592–1609	Albert Frederick; Duke of Prussia; 1568–1618	Marie Eleonore (1550 – 1608)	Anna (1552 – 1632)	Philip Louis; C. Palatine/Duke of Neuburg; 1569–1614	Magdalena d.1633	John Casimir of Zweibrucken d.1604 Montferrat; 1631–1637	François II, Duke of Nevers (c. 1540 – 1563); French Prince étranger and general	Jacques, Duke of Nevers (c. 1544 – 1564) rench Prince étranger and general	Henriette of Cleves (1542 – 1601)	Louis de Gonzague, Duke of Nevers (1539 – 2 1595); French Prince étranger,soldier, governor
John Sigismund (1572 - 1619); Margrave & Elector of Brandenburg; 1608–1619; Duke of Prussia,1618–1619	Anna of Prussia (1576 – 1625) awarded prot. Cleves, Mark & Ravensberg 1614–1619 settlement	Magdalene Sibylle of Prussia (1586 –1659) m. John George I, Elector of Saxony	William Wolfgang; Count Palatine & Duke of Neuburg; 1614–1653 awarded Cath. Jülich & Berg, desc.	Augustus, Count Palatine of Sulzbach (1582–1632); Catholic, desc. eventual heirs and inheritors & Counts Palatine and Bavaria	John Casimir; Count Palatine of Zweibrücken d.1652	Charles I Gonzaga (1580 – 1637); Duke of Mantua and Duke of Montferrat from 1627
George William; Margrave & Elector of Brandenburg; Duke of Prussia; 1619–1640	John George II; Elector of Saxony; 1656–1680

=== Counts of Mark ===
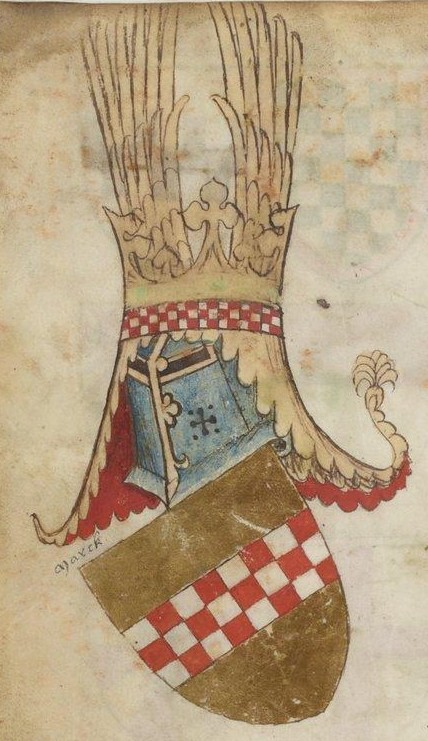
La Mark coat of arms, 14th century

1. Adolf I (d. 1249), first documented as comes de Marca in 1202
  1. Engelbert I (d. 1277)
    1. Eberhard (d. 1308)
      1. Engelbert II (d. 1328)
        1. Adolf II (d. 1346), married Margaret of Cleves in 1332
          1. Engelbert III (d. 1391)
          2. Adolf III (1334–1394), Count of Cleves from 1368 → see below
        2. Engelbert (1304–1368), Prince-Bishop of Liège 1345–1364, Archbishop of Cologne 1364–68
        3. Eberhard I (d. about 1378), Count of Arenberg → see below
      2. Adolf (1288–1344), Prince-Bishop of Liège 1313–1344

=== Dukes of Cleves—La Mark ===
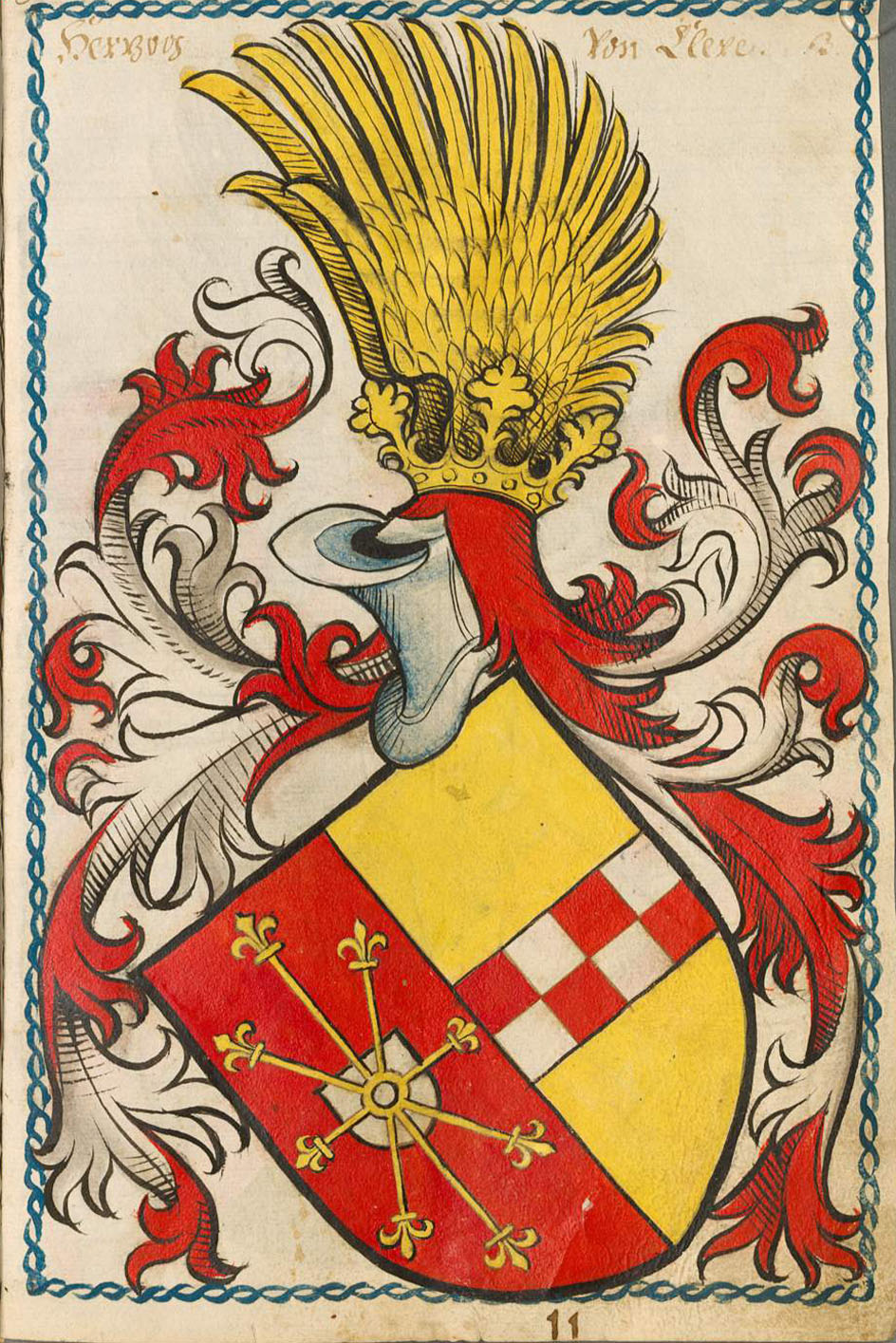
Cleves-La Mark coat of arms, 15th century

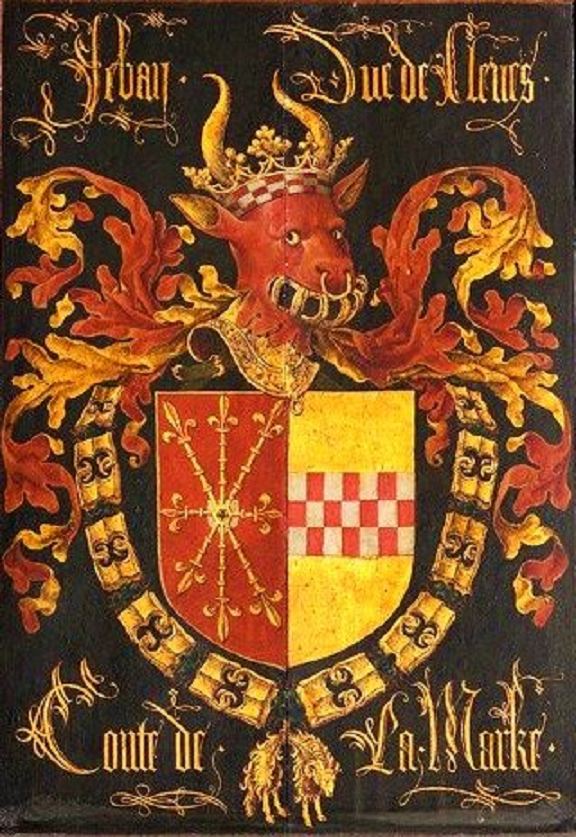
Cleves-La Mark coat of arms, 15th century

1. Adolf III (1334–1394), second son of Adolf II with Margaret of Cleves, Prince-bishop of Münster 1357–1363 and Archbishop of Cologne in 1363, inherited the County of Cleves upon the death of his maternal uncle Count Johann in 1368 and became Count of Mark upon the death of his elder brother Engelbert III in 1391
  1. Adolph I (1373–1448), Duke of Cleves from 1417
    1. Margaret of Cleves, Duchess of Bavaria-Munich (1416–1444)
    2. Catherine of Cleves, Duchess of Guelders (1417–1479)
    3. John I (1419–1481)
      1. John II (1458–1521)
        1. John III (1490–1539), married Maria of Jülich-Berg in 1509, inherited the duchies of Jülich and Berg and the County of Ravensberg upon the death of his father-in-law Duke William IV of Jülich-Berg, ruled the United Duchies of Jülich-Cleves-Berg upon the death of his father in 1521
          1. Sybille (1512–1554), married to Elector John Frederick of Saxony
          2. Anne (1515–1557), married to King Henry VIII of England
          3. William the Rich (1516–1592), married Maria of Habsburg, Archduchess of Austria and daughter of Emperor Ferdinand I, claimed the Duchy of Guelders upon the death of Duke Charles in 1538
            1. Marie Eleonore (1550–1608), married to Albert Frederick, Duke of Prussia
            2. John Frederick (1555–1575)
            3. John William (1562–1609), extinction of the line, followed by the War of the Jülich succession
          4. Amalia (1517–1586)
      2. Engelbert, Count of Nevers (1462–1506)
    4. Elisabeth (1420–1488), Countess of Schwarzburg
    5. Agnes (1422–1446), titular Queen of Navarre
    6. Adolph of Cleves, Lord of Ravenstein (1425–1492)
      1. Philip of Cleves, Lord of Ravenstein (1459–1528)
    7. Mary (1426–1487), Duchess of Orléans
  2. Dietrich II (1374–1398)

=== Counts of Marck—Arenberg ===
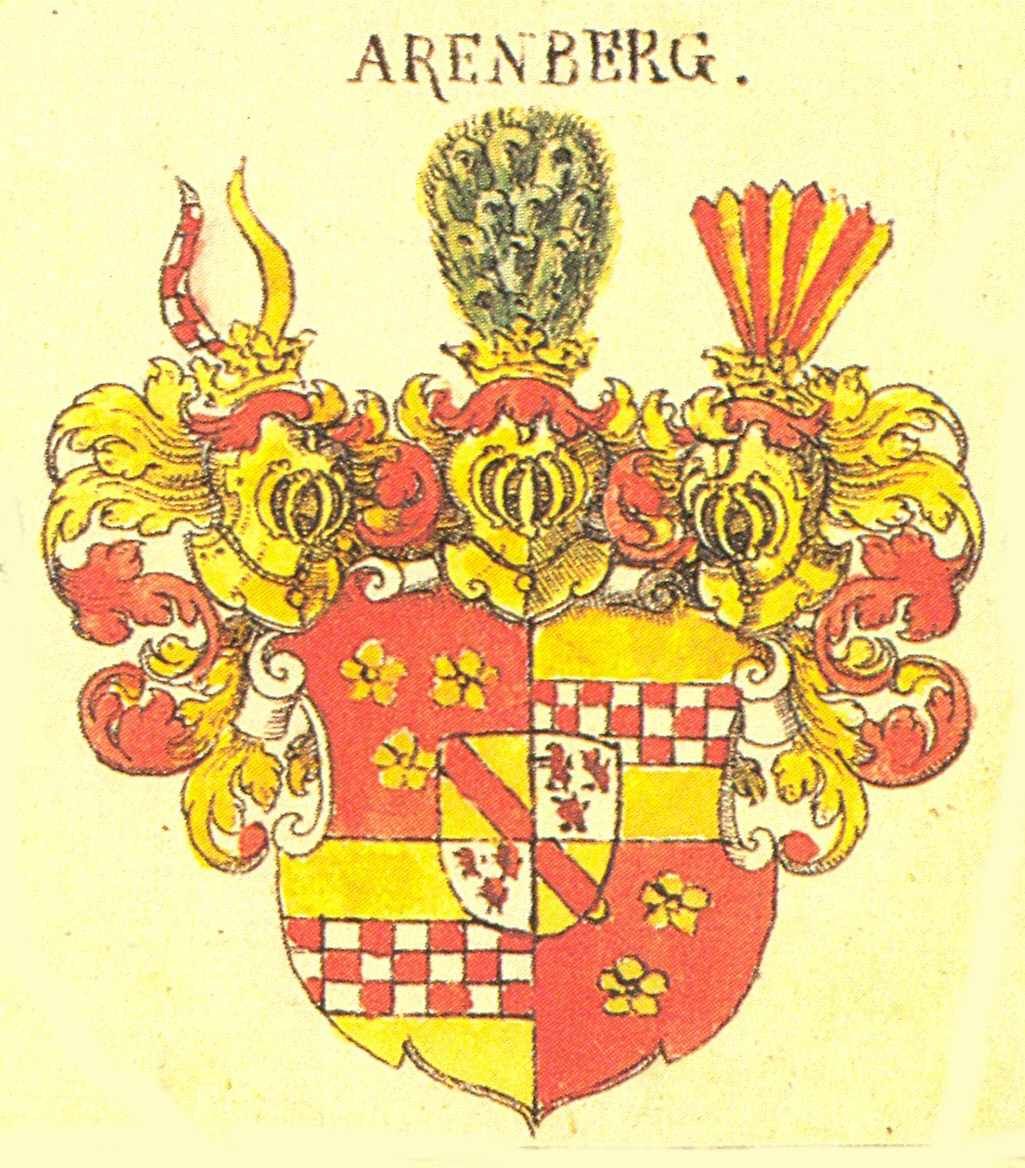
Arenberg coat of arms, Siebmacher, about 1605

1. Eberhard I (d. about 1378) Lord of Arenberg
  1. Erard II von der Mark, Lord of Sedan & Arenberg
    1. Johann II von der Mark, Lord of Sedan & Arenberg
      1. Erard III von der Mark (+ 1496), Lord of Arenberg whose issue will die into the house of Ligne, by the marriage of Marguerite de la Marck-Arenberg with Jean de Ligne
      2. Robert I de la Marck (+ 1487), Lord of Sedan, chatellain de Bouillon
        1. Robert II de la Marck (1460–1536), Lord of Sedan, Duke of Bouillon
          1. Robert III de la Marck (1491–1537), Lord of Sedan, Duke of Bouillon
            1. Robert IV de la Marck (1520–1556), Duke of Bouillon, Earl of Braine & Maulevrier, Lord of Sedan.
              1. Henri Robert de la Marck (1539–1574), Duke of Bouillon, sovereign Prince de Sedan,
                1. Guillaume Robert de la Marck (1563–1588), Pr of Sedan, Duke de Bouillon, Marquess of Cotron
                  1. Charlotte de la Marck (1574–1594), Dss of Bouillon, Pss de Sedan oo Henri de La Tour D'Auvergne
        2. Érard de La Marck (1472–1538), Prince-bishop of Liège 1506–1538
      3. William von der Marck Le Sanglier des Ardennes
        1. Johann I von der Marck, Baron of Lummen
          1. Johann II von der Marck, Baron of Lummen (1500–1552)
            1. William II de la Marck, Baron of Lummen, admiral of the Gueux de mer (1542–1578)

Genealogy of the House of the Mark in Arenberg, Bouillon and Lummen

House of the Mark in Arenberg, Bouillon and Lummen

Eberhard I de La Marck-Arenberg; Lord of Arenberg d. c. 1378/1387 .
Eberhard II von der Mark; Lord of Sedan and Lord of Arenberg d. 1440
Johann II de La Marck; Lord of Sedan and Lord of Arenberg c. 1410–1470
Érard III de La Marck; Lord of Arenberg c. 1435–1496 m. Marguerite de Bouchout	Robert I de La Marck; Lord of Sedan châtelain de Bouillon d. 1487 m. Jeanne de Marley	William I de La Marck; Le Sanglier des Ardennes; Baron of Lummen d. 1485 m. Johanna d'Arschot-Schoonhoven
Érard IV de La Marck-Arenberg; Count of La Marck and Arenberg d. 1531	Robert I de La Marck-Arenberg; Count of Arenberg d. 1541	Robert II de la Marck; 1460–1536; Lord of Sedan; Duke of Bouillon m. 1490 Catherine de Croÿ; 1471–1544	Érard de La Marck; 1472–1538; Prince-Bishop of Liège; 1506–1538; Cardinal de Bouillon	Johann I von der Marck (*1462, +1519); Baron of Lummen m. Margareta von Runkel (+1547)	William de la Marck, sn de Montbazon, d. 20.5.1516
Robert II de La Marck-Arenberg; Lord of Arenberg and Mirwart; 1506–1536	Robert III de la Marck; 1491/92–1537; Lord of Sedan; Duke of Bouillon m. 1510 Guillemette de Saarbrücken	Johann II von der Marck,(1500-1552); m.1534 Margareta van Wassenaer (+24.3.1557)
Robert III de La Marck-Arenberg; Count of Arenberg d. 1544 died without issue	Marguerite de La Marck-Arenberg; 1527–1599; Countess, later Princess-Countess of Arenberg	Jean de Ligne; Baron of Barbançon c. 1525–1568 m. 1547	Robert IV de la Marck; 1520–1556; Duke of Bouillon; Count of Braine and Maulevrier; Lord of Sedan; Marshal of France. m. 1539 Françoise de Brézé	William II de La Marck (1542 - 1578); Baron von Lummen; Gov of Holland, admiral of the Sea Beggars, captor of Brielle	Philipp de La Marck; *1.7.1548, +15.6.1613; Baron von Lummen m.1581 Katharina von Manderscheid (+12.6.1594)
Charles d'Arenberg; 1550–1616; Prince-Count of Arenberg m. 1587 Anne de Croÿ; 1563–1635; Duchess of Aerschot	Robert de Ligne-Arenberg; 1564–1614; Prince of Barbançon	Henri Robert de La Marck (1539/40–1574); Duke of Bouillon; Sovereign Prince of Sedan m. 1559 Françoise de Bourbon-Montpensier (1539–1587)	Barons of Lummen, Gf von Schleiden, Gf von der Marck in Schleiden to Louis Pierre de la Marck; Marquies de Vares; Baron van Lummen en van Seraing le Chateau, an imperial Field Marshal (1701 - 1773)
desc. are Dukes of Aerschot & Arenberg	Guillaume Robert de La Marck; 1563–1588; Prince of Sedan; Duke of Bouillon; Marquess of Cotron	Charlotte de la Marck; 1574–1594; Duchess of Bouillon; Princess of Sedan	Henri de La Tour d'Auvergne; 1555–1623 m. 1591; Charlotte died without surviving issue	Elisabeth of Nassau; 1577–1642; Henri's second wife, m. 1595, d. of Wm. the Silent, pr. of Orange
Frédéric Maurice de La Tour d'Auvergne; 1605–1652; Duke of Bouillon; Prince of Sedan	Henri de La Tour d'Auvergne; 1611–1675; Viscount of Turenne; Marshal General of France

== See also ==
- County of Mark (French Comté de La Marck)

Marguerite de La Marck d'Arenberg (1527–1599), princess-countess and sovereign of Arenberg from 1576. Married Jean de Ligne, baron of Barbançon, in 1547. General of the Spanish armies, he was killed at the battle of Heiligerlée in 1568.
