= John I of Cleves =

Duke of Cleves and Count of Mark (1419–1481)

John I, Duke of Cleves
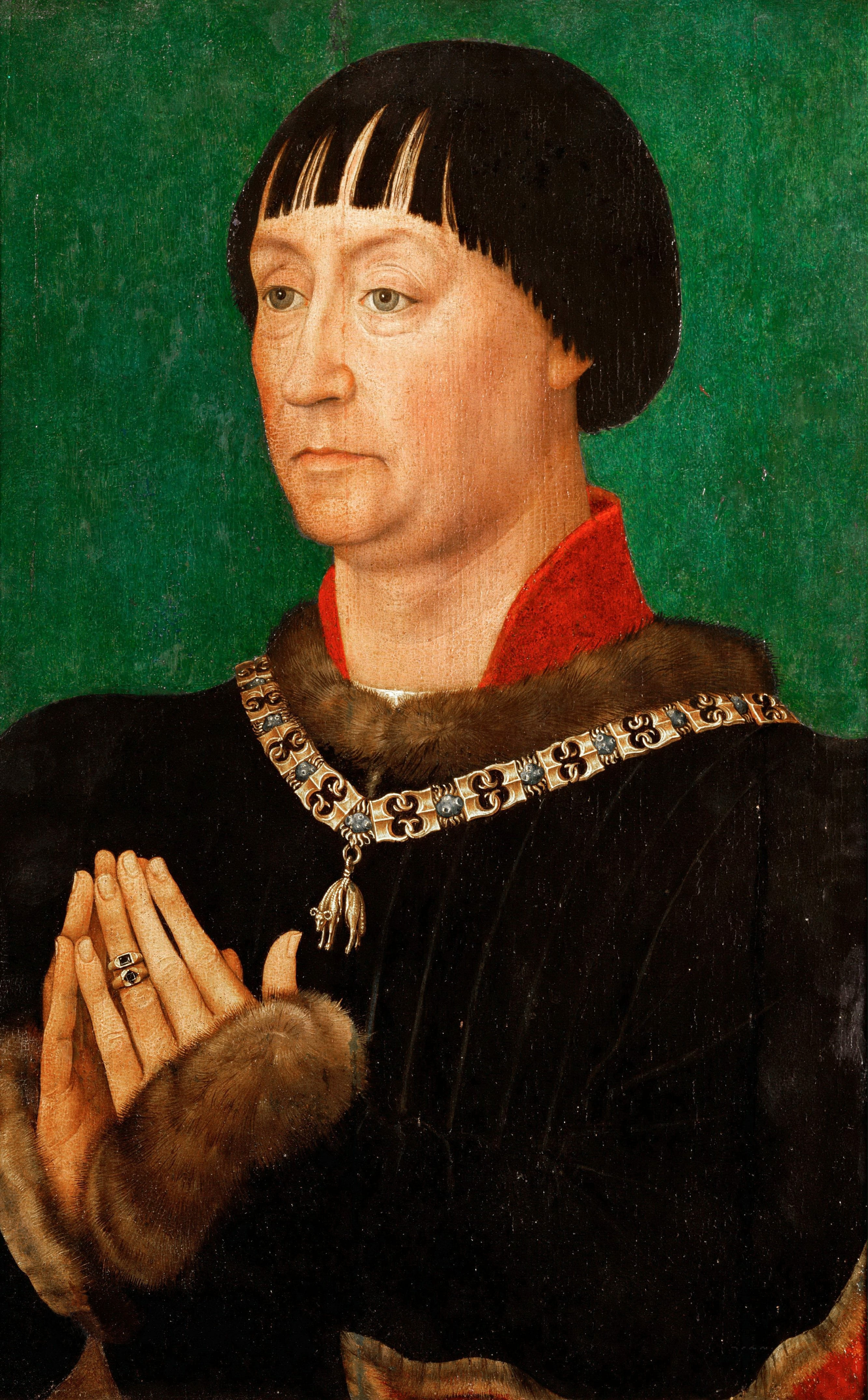
- John I, Duke of Cleves by Rogier van der Weyden
- Born: 16 February 1419
- Died: 5 September 1481 (aged 62)
- Noble family: La Marck
- Spouse: Elizabeth of Nevers
- Issue: John II, Duke of Cleves; Engelbert, Count of Nevers; Philip of Cleves (Bishop)
- Father: Adolph I, Duke of Cleves
- Mother: Mary of Burgundy

John I, Duke of Cleves, Count of Mark (16 February 1419 – 5 September 1481). Jean de Belliqueux (warlike), was Duke of Cleves and Count of Mark.

== Life ==
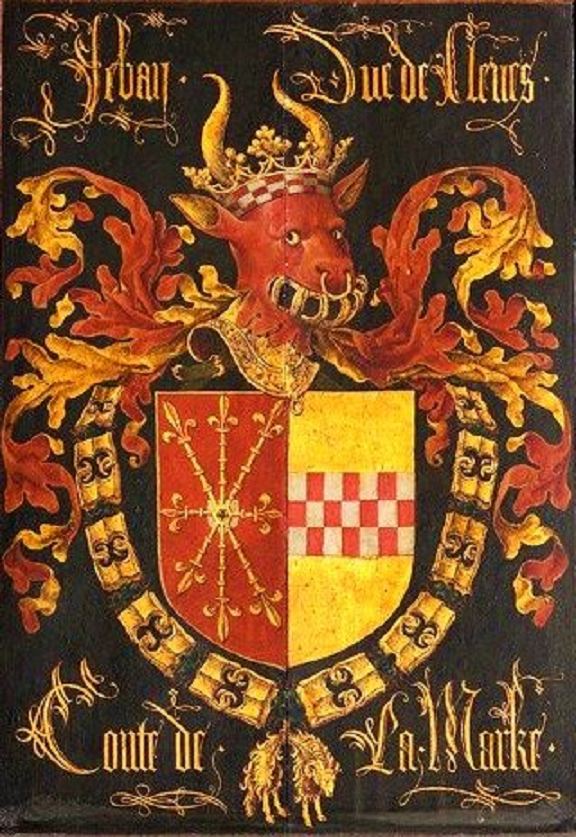
Arms of John I, Duke of Cleves, Count of Mark

John was the son of Adolph I, Duke of Cleves and Mary of Burgundy. He was raised in Brussels at the Burgundian court of his uncle Philip the Good. He ruled Cleves from 1448 from 1481, and Mark since 1461 after the death of his uncle Gerhard who had waged war on his own brother.

John fought 3 wars with the Electorate of Cologne and finally defeated Ruprecht of the Palatinate, conquering the cities of Xanten and Soest. In these wars, he was supported by his uncle Philip the Good, bringing Cleves-Mark into the Burgundian sphere of influence. His marriage with Elisabeth Countess of Nevers, from a sideline of the House of Burgundy, only strengthened this influence. John also took sides in the Münster Diocesan Feud supporting the aspirations of the House of Hoya to the episcopacy in Münster.

John was also made a Knight in the Burgundian Order of the Golden Fleece in 1451, with which he was depicted by Rogier van der Weyden. In 1473 he helped the Burgundian Duke Charles the Bold conquer the Duchy of Guelders.

== Marriage and children ==
On 22 April 1455, John married Elizabeth of Nevers, daughter of John II, Count of Nevers. They had:

- John II, Duke of Cleves (13 April 1458 – 15 March 1521); married 3 November 1489 Matilda of Hesse
- Adolf (1461–1498); a canon of Liege
- Engelbert, Count of Nevers (26 September 1462 – 21 November 1506); married 23 February 1489 Charlotte de Bourbon-Vendôme
- Dietrich (1464)
- Marie of Cleves (1465–1513)
- Philip of Cleves (1467–1505); Bishop of Nevers, Amiens and Autun

== Ancestry ==
Ancestors of John I of Cleves

16. Engelbert II of the Mark (c.1275–1328)
8. Adolph II of the Mark (c.1314–1347)
17. Matilda of Arenberg (c.1280–1349)
4. Adolph I of Kleve-Mark (1334–1394)
18. Dietrich VIII of Cleves (1291–1346)
9. Margaret of Cleves (c.1310-aft 1348)
19. Margaret of Guelders (1297–1333)
2. Adolph I, Duke of Cleves (1373–1448)
20. William V, Duke of Jülich (c.1299–1361)
10. Gerhard VI of Jülich, Count of Berg and Ravensberg (c.1325–1360)
21. Joanna of Hainaut (1311/13-1374)
5. Margaret of Jülich (c.1350–1425/29)
22. Otto IV, Count of Ravensberg (bef 1276–1328)
11. Margaret of Ravensberg (c.1320–1389)
23. Margaret of Berg-Windeck (?-1339)
1. John I, Duke of Cleves
24. John II of France (1319–1364)
12. Philip the Bold (1343–1404)
25. Bonne of Bohemia (1315–1349)
6. John the Fearless (1371–1419)
26. Louis II of Flanders (1330–1384)
13. Margaret III, Countess of Flanders (1393–1466)
27. Margaret of Brabant (1323–1380)
3. Mary of Burgundy, Duchess of Cleves (1393–1466)
28. Louis IV, Holy Roman Emperor (1282–1347)
14. Albert I, Duke of Bavaria (1350–1405)
29. Margaret, Countess of Hainaut (1311–1356)
7. Margaret of Bavaria (1363–1424)
30. Ludwik I the Fair (c.1321–1398)
15. Margaret of Brieg (1342–1386)
31. Agnes of Glogau (c.1321–1362)

== Sources ==
- Boltanski, Ariane (2006). Les ducs de Nevers et l'État royal: genèse d'un compromis (ca 1550 - ca 1600) (in French). Librairie Droz S.A.
- Boulton, D'Arcy Jonathan Dacre (2000). The Knights of the Crown: The Monarchical Orders of Knighthood in Later. The Boydell Press.
- Laffan, R.G.D. (1936). "The Empire in the Fifteenth Century". In Previte-Orton, C.W.; Brooke, Z.N. (eds.). The Cambridge Medieval History: The Close of the Middle Ages. Vol. 8. Cambridge University Press.
- Vaughan, Richard (2002). Charles the Bold: The Last Valois Duke of Burgundy. Vol. 4. The Boydell Press.

John I of Cleves House of La Marck Born: 16 February 1419 Died: 5 September 1481
Preceded by Adolph I	Duke of Cleves; 1448–1481	Succeeded by John II
Preceded by Gerhard	Count of Mark; 1448/de facto 1461–1481	Succeeded by John II
