= Adolf of Mark =

Adolf (or Adolph) of Mark (also of the Mark or of La Marck; French: Adolphe de la Marck, German: Adolf von der Mark) may refer to:

- Adolf I, Count of Mark (died 1249)
- Adolf II (bishop of Liège) (1288–1344), descendant of Adolf I, Count of Mark
- Adolf II, Count of Mark (died 1347), count
- Adolf III, Count of Mark (died 1394), count of Mark and Cleves, bishop of Münster and archbishop of Cologne
- Adolph I, Duke of Cleves (1373–1448), also Adolf IV, Count of Mark
