= County of Mark =

State of the Holy Roman Empire

Coordinates: 51°40′25″N 7°48′57″E

County of Mark Grafschaft Mark (German)
- c. 1198–1807
- Coat of arms

- Map of the Lower Rhenish–Westphalian Circle around 1560, County of Mark highlighted in red
- Status: County
- Capital: Hamm
- Historical era: Middle Ages, Renaissance
  - Established: 12th century
  - United with Cleves: 1391
  - Joined Lower Rhenish-Westphalian Circle: 1500
  - Part of Jülich-Cleves-Berg: 1521
  - To Brandenburg: 1614
  - Awarded to Berg: 1807
  - To Prussia: 1815
Preceded by	Succeeded by
Duchy of Saxony	Grand Duchy of Berg

The County of Mark (German: Grafschaft Mark, French: Comté de La Marck colloquially known as Die Mark) was a county and state of the Holy Roman Empire in the Lower Rhenish–Westphalian Circle. It lay south of Lippe river on both sides of the Ruhr river along the Volme and Lenne rivers.

The Counts of Mark were among the most powerful and influential Westphalian lords in the Holy Roman Empire. The name Mark derived from a small village Mark and the nearby Castle Mark, the latter was built between 1190 and 1202, both today incorporated in the unitary authority Hamm, founded in 1226 by the first Count, Adolph de la Mark. His father used the older title Altena or Berg-Altena. The county’s name is preserved in the present-day Märkischer Kreis district in lands south of the Ruhr in North Rhine-Westphalia, Germany. When the districts were reorganized in 1975, the former district of Altena was merged with parts of several neighboring districts to form the new Märkischer Kreis. The Märkischer Kreis district represents only the southern portion of the former county. Today, the territory of the old county is divided between Märkischer Kreis, parts of the cities of Bochum, Dortmund, Hagen, and Hamm, as well as the districts of Unna, Soest and Ennepe-Ruhr.

== Geography ==
The County of Mark enclosed an area of approximately 3,000 km^{2} and extended between the Lippe and Aggers rivers (north-south) and between Gelsenkirchen and Bad Sassendorf (west-east) for about 75 km. The east–west flowing Ruhr separated the county into two different regions: the northern, fertile lowlands of Hellweg Börde; and the southern hills of the Süder Uplands (Sauerland). In the south–north direction the southern part of the county was crossed by the Lenne. In the region of the Lower Lenne was the County of Limburg (1243–1808), a fiefdom of Berg.

The seat of the Counts of the Mark von de Marck or de la Marck was originally the Burg Altena in the Sauerland region, but moved to Burg Mark near Hamm in the 1220s. The county was bordered by Vest Recklinghausen, the County of Dortmund, the Bishopric of Münster, the County of Limburg, Werden Abbey, and Essen Abbey.

== Coat of arms ==

The coat of arms of the county was "Or a fess chequy Gules and Argent of three". These arms have been used by the city of Hamm since 1226. Many other places in the area include the red and white checkered fess in their arms as a reference to the county and often to their founders.

== History ==
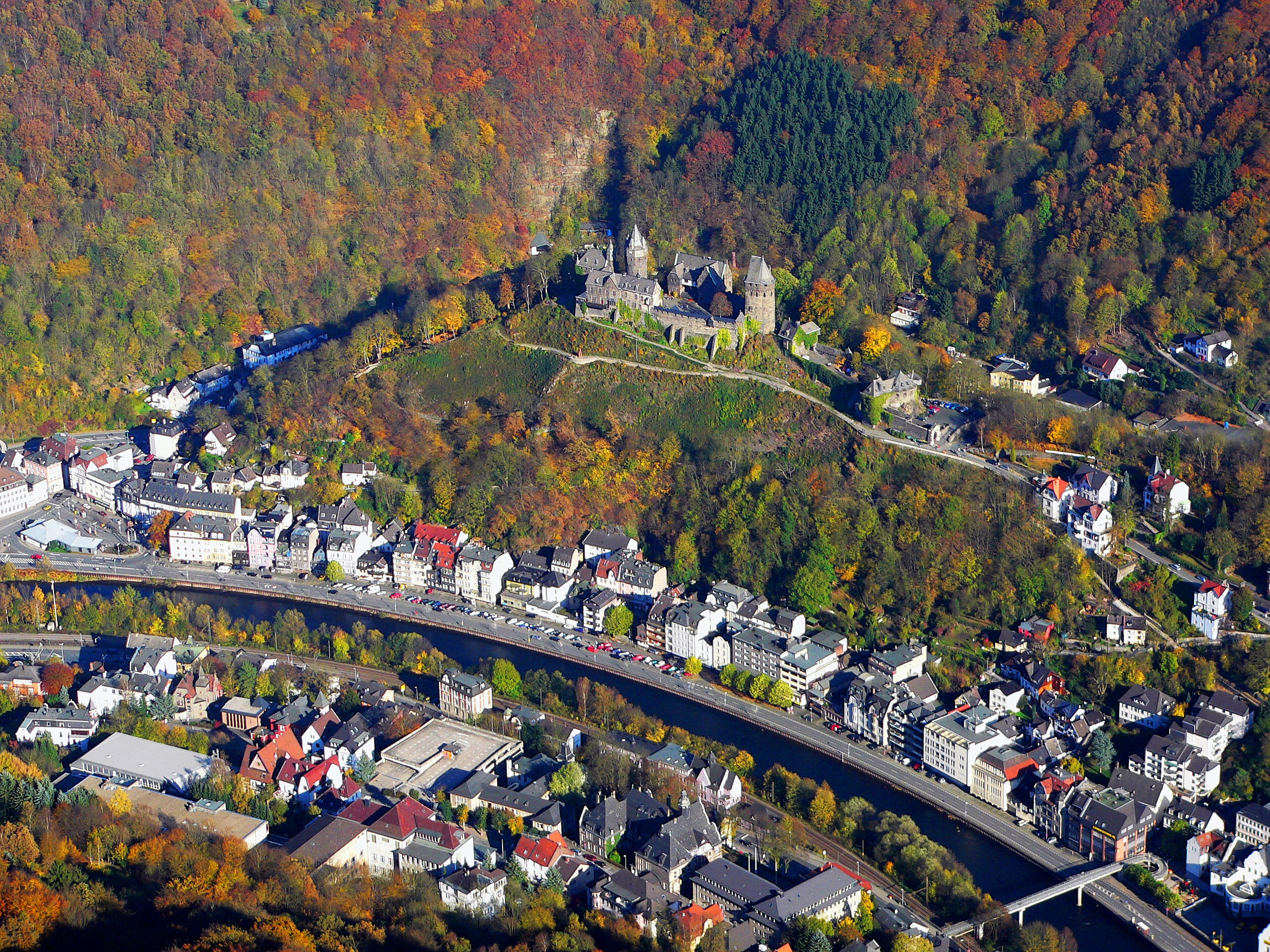
View of Altena Castle and Lenne in Altena

Originally belonging to a collateral line of the counts of Berg at Altena, the territory emerged under the name of Berg-Altena in 1160. About 1198 Count Frederick I purchased the Mark Oberhof, a parish land (Feldmark) on the territory of the Edelherren of Rüdenberg, liensmen of the Cologne archbishop Philip von Heinsberg. Here Frederick had the Mark Castle (Burg Mark) erected as the residence of the new "Counts of the Mark". The nearby town of Hamm was founded by his son Adolf I, Count of the Mark in 1226, it soon became most important settlement of the county and was often used as residence.

In the 1288 Battle of Worringen, Count Eberhard II fought on the side of Duke John I of Brabant and Count Adolph V of Berg against his liege, the Cologne archbishop Siegfried II of Westerburg, titular Duke of Westphalia. As Brabant and its allies were victorious, the County of Mark gained supremacy in southern Westphalia and became independent of the Archbishopric of Cologne. The territory of Mark was for long restricted to the lands between the Ruhr and Lippe rivers ("Lower Mark"). New territories in the north ("Higher Mark") were gained during the 14th century in wars against the Prince-Bishopric of Münster.

In 1332, Count Adolph II married Margarete, the daughter of Count Dietrich VIII of Cleves. Adolph's younger son Adolph III upon the death of Dietrich's brother Count John acquired the County of Cleves on the western banks of the Rhine in 1368. In 1391, Adolph III also inherited the Mark from his elder brother Engelbert III and united both counties as "Cleves-Mark" in 1394.

In 1509, the heir to the throne of Cleves-Mark John III the Peaceful married Maria, the daughter of Duke William IV of Berg and Jülich. In 1511, he succeeded his father-in-law in Jülich-Berg and in 1521 his father in Cleves-Mark, resulting in the rule of almost all territories in present North Rhine-Westphalia in personal union, except for the ecclesiastical states. The dynasty of Jülich-Cleves-Berg became extinct in 1609, when the insane last duke John William had died. A long dispute about the succession followed, before the territory of Mark together with Cleves and Ravensberg was granted to the Brandenburg Elector John Sigismund of Hohenzollern by the 1614 Treaty of Xanten (generally accepted in 1666). It then became part of the Kingdom of Prussia after 1701.

In 1807, the County of the Mark passed from Prussia to France in the Treaties of Tilsit. In 1808, Napoleon then gave Mark to the elevated Grand Duchy of Berg, which was divided into four departments along the lines of Napoleonic France. Mark was in the Ruhr Department until the collapse of French power in 1813, when it returned to Prussia.

The Prussian administrative reform of 30 April 1815 placed Mark within Regierungsbezirk Arnsberg, Province of Westphalia. The Hohenzollern Prussian sovereigns remained Counts of the "Prussian County of the Mark" until 1918. The "County of the Mark" has no official meaning anymore, but is used to informally refer to the region in North Rhine-Westphalia.

== List of counts ==
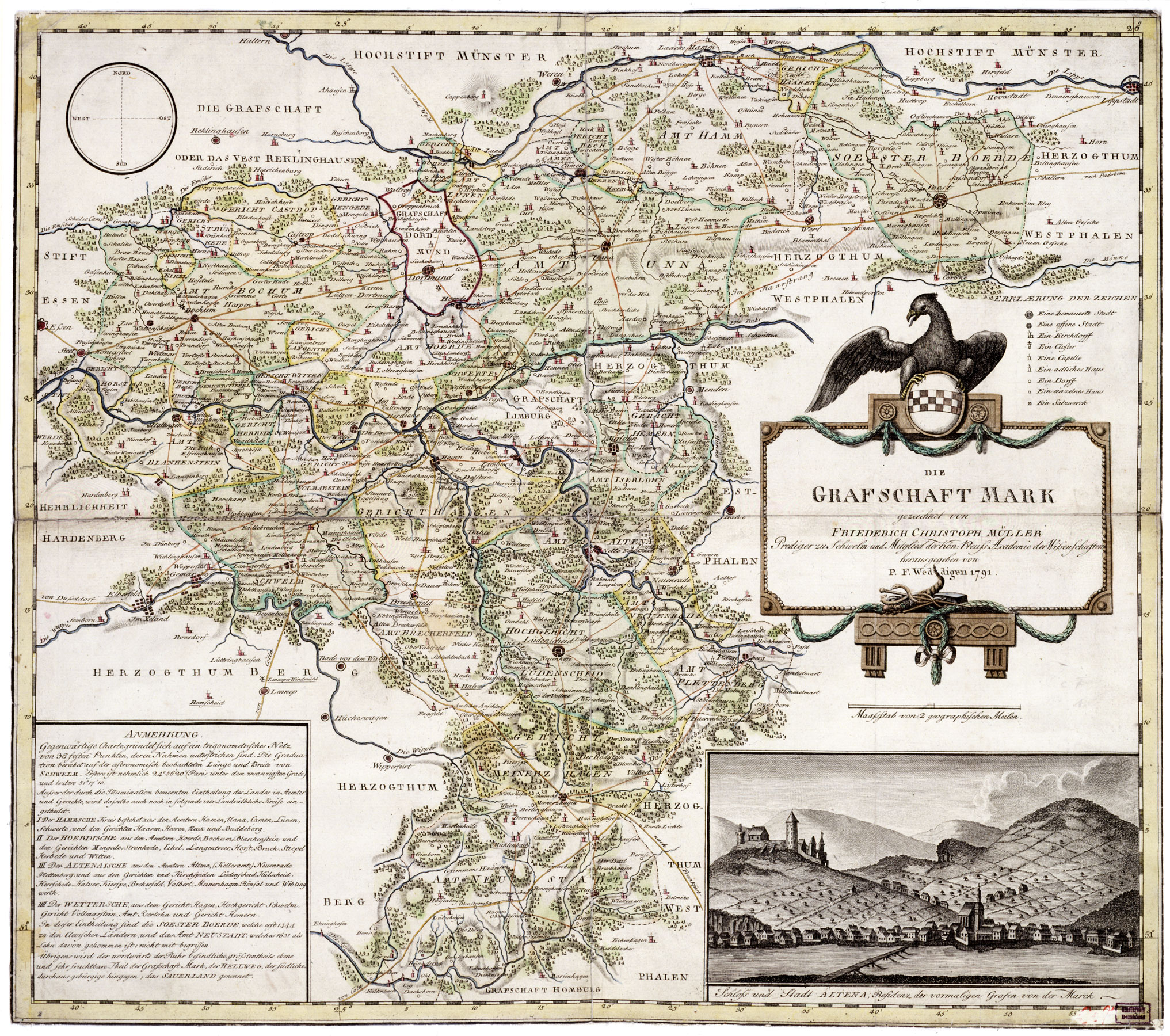
A 1791 map of the County of Mark by German cartographer Friedrich Christoph Müller (1751–1808)

The House of La Marck is a cadet branch of Berg dynasty. Another surviving line of the House of Berg (more senior but less prominent in European History) became counts of Isenberg, then count of Limburg and Limburg Styrum.

- 1160–1180 Eberhard I, son of Adolf IV, Count of Berg
- 1180–1198 Frederick I, son of Eberhard I
- 1198–1249 Adolph I, son of Frederick I. First Count of the House to name himself Count de La Marck in 1202; he scarcely used the titles of Berg and Altena
- 1249–1277 Engelbert I
- 1277–1308 Eberhard II
- 1308–1328 Engelbert II
- 1328–1347 Adolph II
- 1347–1391 Engelbert III
- 1391–1393 Adolph III, brother of Engelbert III, Count of Cleves since 1368 and former Bishop of Münster and Archbishop of Cologne
- 1393–1398 Dietrich
- 1398–1448 Adolph IV, son of Adolf III, also Count of Cleves 1394–1417, Duke of Cleves 1417–1448
- 1437–1461 Gerhard, brother of Adolf IV – Regent in the county, not allowed to use the title Count de la Mark in his own rights
- 1448–1481 John I, son of Adolph IV, also Duke of Cleves since 1448
- 1481–1521 John II "The Babymaker", son, also Duke of Cleves
- 1521–1539 John III "the Peaceful", son, also Duke of Jülich-Berg since 1511
- 1539–1592 William "the Rich", son, also Duke of Jülich-Berg, Duke of Guelders 1538–1543
- 1592-1609 John William, son, son, also Duke of Jülich-Berg

=== Genealogy of the House of Berg in Cleves, Julich, Mark and Berg ===
Genealogy of the House of Berg in Cleves, Julich, Mark and Berg

House of Berg

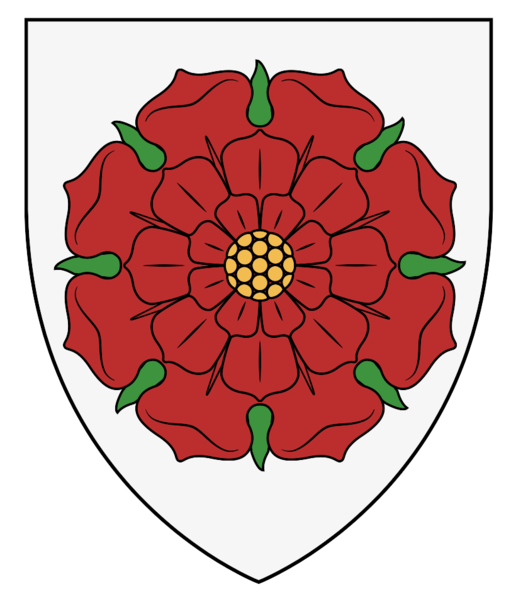
COUNT OR DUKE OF BERG	COUNT OR DUKE OF CLEVES	COUNT OR DUKE OF JŰLICH	ISENBERG/LIMBURG	COUNTS OF THE MARK	COUNTS OF RAVENSBURG	COUN OR DUKE OF GELDERLAND
Herman I Count Palatine of Lorraine; 985–996	Otto II; Emperor; 973–983
Adolf of Lorraine	Ezzo; Count Palatine of Lorraine; 996–1034 ancestor of Ezzonids	Mathilde d. 1025
Adolf	Richeza d. 1063	Mieszko II; Duke of Poland; 1025–1031; 1032–1034
Adolf I Count of Berg; 1077–c.1082	Casimir I the Restorer; Duke of Poland; 1034, rebellion 1038/40–1058
Adolf II of Berg; Count of Berg c.1082–c.1090	House of Wassenberg
Adolf III of Berg; Count of Berg c.1090–1106	Gerard I Flamens(ca. 970 - † bef. 1042)	Rütger I Count of Cleves d.<1092 House of Wassenberg
Adolf IV of Berg; Count of Berg; 1106–1161 or	Bruno II von Berg; Archbishop of Cologne; 1131–1137	Counts and dukes of Guelders	Arnold; Count of Cleves (<1092–c.1147)
Engelbert I Count of Berg; 1161–1189	Friedrich II of Berg; Archbishop of Cologne; 1156–1158	Adolf V d. 1148 (at Damascus)	Bruno III of Berg; Archbishop of Cologne; 1191–1193 d. 1196/1200	Eberhard I, Count of Berg-Altena (and IV); 1140 – 1180 eastern part of Berg becomes c. of Altena	Dietrich III; Count of Cleves c.1147–c.1172
Adolf VI; Count of Berg; 1189–1218	Engelbert II the Holy; Archbishop of Cologne; 1216–1225	Walter of Hennebach d.<1172	Arnold of Altena (1166 - 1209) 1st count of Isenberg, ancestor of counts of Limburg Hohenlimburg and Broich	Adolf of Altena (1168 - 1220) Archbishop of Cologne, 1193 - 1205, 1212 - 1214	Friedrich I of Altena (1173–1198) count of Berg-Altena, which renamed C. of Mark, ancestor of House of La Marck	Dietrich IV; Count of Cleves (1172–1193)
Irmgard of Berg d.1248	Henry IV (Arlon); Duke of Limburg; 1226–1246; 1/2 br. was Henry V, Count of Luxembourg anc. of Imperial House of Luxembourg	Eberhard d. 1218	Eberhard II (born 1180, died 1209) count of Altena and Isenberg	Frederick of Isenberg (1193 – 1226) attained re murder of Archb. of Engelbert II of Cologne	Dietrich III, Bishop of Münster (< 1180 - 1226)	Engelbert of Altena-Isenberg (< 1200 - 1250); B. of Osnabruck (1224-dep. 1226 for Engelbert II of Berg's assassination, rehab. 1238-1250)	Adolf I, Count of Mark (1194? - 1249)	Dietrich V Count of Cleves; 1193–1260
Adolf VII (1220 † 1259); Count of Berg	Waleran IV († 1279); Duke of Limburg	William III, Count of Jülich; 1207-1219 heir of uncle William II	Dietrich I of Isenberg before 1215–1301; 1st Count of Limburg (Counts of Limburg Hohenlimburg and Broich)	Friedrich of Altena (< 1220 - > 1243); C. of Limburg-Isenberg	Engelbert I, Count of Mark(d. 1277); C. of the Mark, 1249, C. of Altena, 1269	Otto, (1212-1269) C. of Altena	Dietrich VI; Count of Cleves; 1260–1275
Ermengarde († 1283)	Reginald I Count of Guelders (Wassenberg)	William IV, Count of Jülich (c. 1210 – 1278)	Johann of Isenberg-Limburg (< 1246 - < 1277)	Eberhard, Count of Mark (c. 1255–1308)	Dietrich VII (1256–1305); Count of Cleves,(1275–1305)
Adolf VIII of Berg († 1296) Count of Berg	William I († 1308) Count of Berg	Henry of Windeck († 1292)	Walram, Count of Jülich (1240/45 – 1297)	Gerhard V, C. of Jülich (bef 1250 – 1328), count 1297	from here desc. LIMBURG-STIRUM (see below)	Engelbert II, Count of Mark (1275 – 1328)	Adolf II (bishop of Liège) (1288 – 1344)	Dietrich VIII (c. 1291 – 1347); Count of Cleves (1311–1347)	Otto, Count of Cleves (1278 – 1310); Count of Cleves (1305–1311)	John (1293-1368); Count of Cleves (1347–1368)
Adolf IX of Berg († 1348) Count of Berg	Margaret of Berg-Windeck d.< 1339 m. Otto IV, Count of Ravensberg	Walram; Archbishop of Cologne; 1332–1349	William; V as count, I as margrave & duke (c. 1299 – 1361)	Eberhard I (d. about 1378), Count of Arenberg see below House of Marck-Arenberg/Bouillon/Lummey	Engelbert (1304–1368), Prince-Bishop of Liège 1345–1364, Archbishop of Cologne 1364–68	Adolf II, Count of Mark (d.1347)	Margaret of Cleves, Countess of the Marck (c. 1310 – after 1348)
Margaret of Ravensberg	Gerhard VI count of Berg, Ravensberg	William VI; II duke of Jülich ∞ Maria, Duchess of Guelders	Engelbert III (1333–1391), C. of the Mark, 1347	Adolf III (1334–1394), Absp. of Cologne, 1363-64, C. of Cleves, 1368
William VII of Jülich, 1st Duke of Berg duke of Berg, count of Ravensberg	William duke of Guelders, III of Jülich ∞ Katherine of Bavaria	Reinald IV duke of Guelders, Jülich	Joanna of Jülich ∞ John V lord of Arkel	Adolph I (1373–1448), his successor in Cleves, 1394 and also in Marck, 1398. Duke of Cleves, 1417	Dietrich (1374–1398), his successor in Marck.	Gerhard († 1461), de facto Count of the Marck, but not allowed to use the title.
Adolf (c. 1370 – 1437); Count of Ravensberg, 1395-1403; Duke of Berg, 1408; Duke of Jülich, 1423	William VIII (c. 1380 – 1428) count of Ravensberg, 1403	Marie of Harcourt (daughter of John VI count of Harcourt)	Maria van Arkel ∞ John II lord of Egmond	John I (1419–1481); Duke of Cleves, 1448; Count of the Mark, 1448/1461	Elizabeth of Nevers, daughter of John II, Count of Nevers(Valois-Burgundy)	Adolph of Cleves, Lord of Ravenstein (1425–1492) m. 1453, to Beatrice of Portugal
Rupert (d. 1431)	Gerhard VII duke of Jülich-Berg, count of Ravensberg	Arnold duke of Guelders; HOUSE OF EGMONT	John II (1458-1521); Duke of Cleves & Count of the Mark, 1521	Engelbert, Count of Nevers (1462-1506); Count of Nevers, 1491upon death of his maternal grandfather John II, Count of Nevers	Philip of Cleves (1467–1505); Bishop of Nevers, Amiens and Autun
William; IV duke of Jülich-Berg, count of Ravensberg ∞ Sibylle of Brandenburg
Maria of Jülich-Berg	John III (1490-1539); Duke of Cleves & Count of the Mark, 1511; Duke of Jülich & Berg, Count of Ravensberg, 1521; HOUSE OF LA MARCK	Adolf (1498–1525), appointed by his father's cousin Philip of Cleves, Lord of Ravenstein and Wijnendale, as his successor, but died before Philip did in 1528	Charles II, Count of Nevers (d.1521)m.Marie of Albret, Countess of Rethel
Sibylle d.1554	John Frederick I the Magnanimous; Elector of Saxony; 1532–1547 d.1554	Anne of Cleves d.1557	Henry VIII; King of England; 1509–1547; King of Ireland; 1541–1547	William I the Rich; Duke of Cleves–Jülich– Mark–Berg– Ravensberg; 1539–1592	Maria of Austria d.1581 d. of Ferdinand I, Holy Roman Emperor	Francis I Count of Nevers, 1521-39; Duke of Nevers, 1539-62
John William; Duke of Cleves–Jülich– Mark–Berg– Ravensberg; 1592–1609	Albert Frederick; Duke of Prussia; 1568–1618	Marie Eleonore (1550 – 1608)	Anna (1552 – 1632)	Philip Louis; C. Palatine/Duke of Neuburg; 1569–1614	Magdalena d.1633	John Casimir of Zweibrucken d.1604 Montferrat; 1631–1637	François II, Duke of Nevers (c. 1540 – 1563); French Prince étranger and general	Jacques, Duke of Nevers (c. 1544 – 1564) rench Prince étranger and general	Henriette of Cleves (1542 – 1601)	Louis de Gonzague, Duke of Nevers (1539 – 2 1595); French Prince étranger,soldier, governor
John Sigismund (1572 - 1619); Margrave & Elector of Brandenburg; 1608–1619; Duke of Prussia,1618–1619	Anna of Prussia (1576 – 1625) awarded prot. Cleves, Mark & Ravensberg 1614–1619 settlement	Magdalene Sibylle of Prussia (1586 –1659) m. John George I, Elector of Saxony	William Wolfgang; Count Palatine & Duke of Neuburg; 1614–1653 awarded Cath. Jülich & Berg, desc.	Augustus, Count Palatine of Sulzbach (1582–1632); Catholic, desc. eventual heirs and inheritors & Counts Palatine and Bavaria	John Casimir; Count Palatine of Zweibrücken d.1652	Charles I Gonzaga (1580 – 1637); Duke of Mantua and Duke of Montferrat from 1627
George William; Margrave & Elector of Brandenburg; Duke of Prussia; 1619–1640	John George II; Elector of Saxony; 1656–1680

=== House of Hohenzollern ===
- 1614–1619 John Sigismund of Hohenzollern
- 1619–1640 George William, son
- 1640–1688 Frederick William I, son
- 1688–1713 Frederick I, son, King in Prussia from 1701
- 1713–1740 Frederick William I, son, King in Prussia
- 1740–1786 Frederick II, son, King of Prussia from 1772
- 1786–1797 Frederick William II, nephew, King of Prussia
- 1797–1807 Frederick William III, King of Prussia

To France by the 1807 Treaty of Tilsit, incorporated into Grand Duchy of Berg

== See also ==
- de la Marck (French spelling of the family name which is often used in English)
