= Margaret of Cleves =

Margaret of Cleves may refer to:

- Margaret of Cleves (died 1190), wife of Louis III, Landgrave of Thuringia
- Margaret of Cleves (died 1251), wife of Otto II, Count of Guelders
- Margaret of Cleves (daughter of Dietrich VII, Count of Cleves), wife of Henry of Lodi (d. 1337) (son of Guy, Count of Flanders)
- Margaret of Cleves, Countess of the Marck (c. 1310 – c. 1341), wife of Adolf II van der Mark
- Margaret of Cleves, Duchess of Bavaria-Straubing (c. 1375–1411), wife of Albrecht of Bavaria
- Margaret of Cleves, Duchess of Bavaria-Munich (1416–44), wife of William III of Bavaria and Ulrich V of Württemberg
