= Engelbert III of Mark =

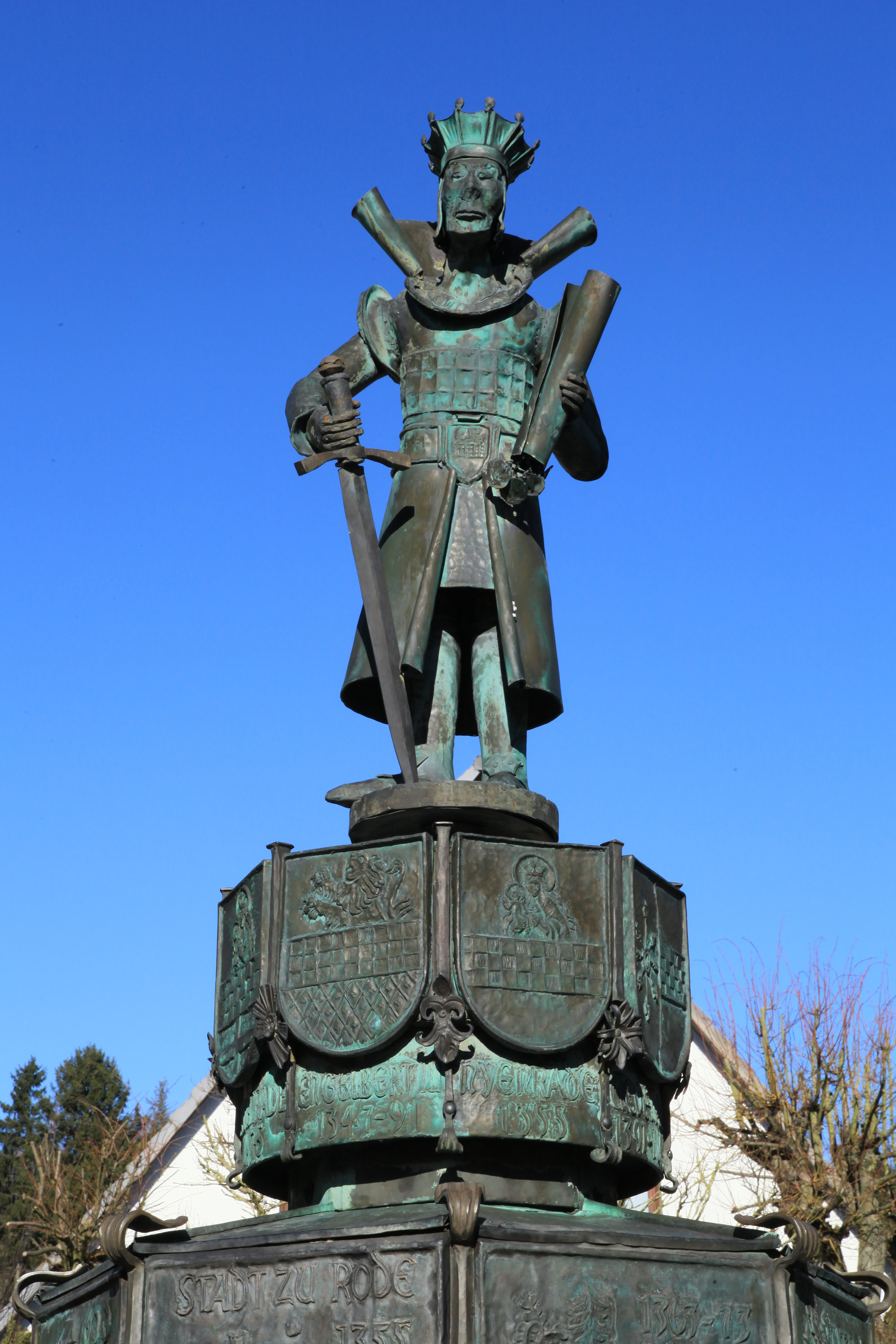
Statue of Engelbert III of the Mark in Neuenrade.

Engelbert III of the Mark (1333–1391) was the Count of Mark from 1347 until 1391.

Adolph was the eldest son of Count Adolph II of the Marck and Margaret of Cleves. After his father died in 1347, Engelbert III ruled the County of Mark, mainly from Burg Blankenstein in 1393.

In his time, he was the leading political leader of Westphalia. He was though, efficient and successful, but failed to conquer Arnsberg after years of struggle.

Engelbert was married with:

- Richardis of Jülich († 1360), daughter of William V, Duke of Jülich, in 1354,
- Elisabeth of Spanheim-Sayn († 1416), daughter of Count Simon III of Vianden, in 1381,

and had one daughter:

- Margaret († 1410), married with Philip X of Falkenstein and Münzenberg († 1407).

When Engelbert died of the plague in 1391, he was succeeded by his brother Adolph II of the Marck, Archbishopric of Cologne.

Engelbert III of Mark House of La Marck Born: 1333 Died: 1391
Preceded by Adolf II	Count of Marck; 1347–1391	Succeeded by Adolf III
