= Adolph I of Cleves =

Adolph I of Cleves may refer to:

- Adolph I, Count of Cleves (r. 1368–1394), also bishop of Münster, archbishop of Cologne and count of Mark
- Adolph I, Duke of Cleves (r. 1417–1448), previously count of Cleves (as Adolph II) from 1394, also count of Mark
