= Gerhard VI =

Gerhard VI may refer to:

- Gerhard VI of Jülich, Count of Berg and Ravensberg (c. 1325 – 1360)
- Gerhard VI, Count of Holstein (~1367–1404)
- Gerhard VI, Count of Oldenburg (1430–1500)
