= Elisabeth of Cleves =

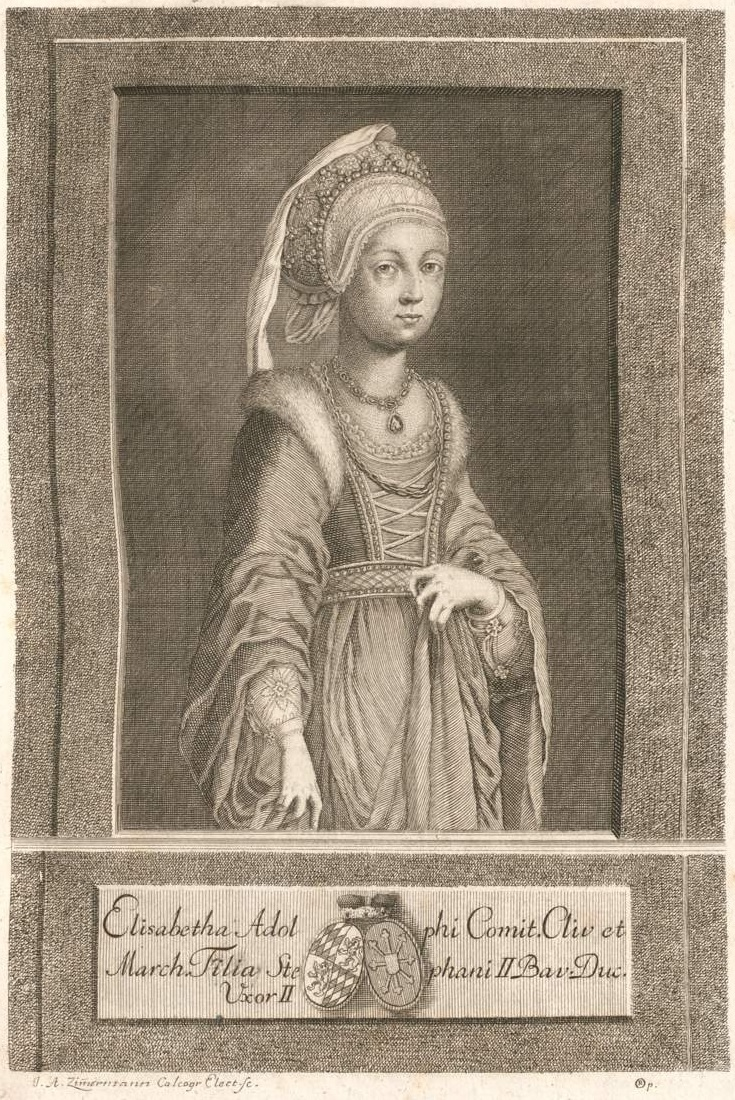
- A posthumous engraving of Elisabeth by Joseph Zimmermann
- Born: 1378
- Died: 1424 (aged 45–46)
- Noble family: House of La Marck
- Spouses: Reginald of Falkenburg; Stephen III, Duke of Bavaria
- Father: Adolf III of the Marck
- Mother: Margaret of Jülich

Myntha Elisabeth of Cleves was Duchess of Bavaria-Ingolstadt from 1401 to 1413. She was the daughter of the Duke of Cleves, Adolf III of the Marck, and Margaret of Jülich. She married Reginald of Falkenburg in 1393, who died in 1396. On 16 January 1401, she started a new marriage with the Stephen III, Duke of Bavaria, but did not have any children.

== See also ==
- Duchy of Bavaria
- Kleve
- Duchy of Cleves

Elisabeth of Cleves House of La Marck Born: 1378 Died: 1424
Preceded by Taddea Visconti; With Maddalena Visconti	Duchess consort of Bavaria-Ingolstadt; 1401–1413	Succeeded by Margaret of Austria
