= Elisabeth of Cleves, Countess of Schwarzburg-Blankenburg =

Elisabeth of Cleves
- Born: October 1, 1420
- Died: March 1488 (aged 67)
- Noble family: House of La Marck
- Spouse: Henry XXVI of Schwarzburg-Blankenburg
- Father: Adolph I, Duke of Cleves
- Mother: Marie of Burgundy

Elisabeth of Cleves was the daughter of Adolph I, Duke of Cleves and Marie of Burgundy, Duchess of Cleves. She married Count Henry XXVI of Schwarzburg-Blankenburg, on July 15, 1434.

== Children ==
Together, they had eleven children:

- Günther XXXVI (July 8, 1439 – Rudolstadt, December 30, 1503);
- Henry XXVII (November 13, 1440 – December 14, 1496), Archbishop of Bremen;
- Catherine (February 2, 1442 – November 9, 1484), married Busso VII of Mansfeld and Sigmund I of Gleichen-Tonna;
- Günther XXXVII (June 8, 1443);
- Henry XXVIII (January 8, 1447 – Bremen, 1481), Canon in Cologne and Mainz;
- Günther XXXVIII (Rudolstadt, 1450 – Bremen, November 29, 1484) married Catherine of Querfurt and Anna of Gleichen;
- Henry XXIX (August 10, 1452 – March 31, 1499), Canon at Hildesheim;
- Günther XXXIX (May 30, 1455 – Arnstadt, August 8, 1521), married Amalia of Mansfeld;
- Heinrich XXX (December 31, 1456 – Arnstadt, June 12, 1522), Canon in Strasbourg and Jechasburg;
- Maria (June 16, 1458);
- Mary (November 4, 1459 – December 1459).

== See also ==
- Duchy of Cleves
