= Gerhard, Count of Mark =

German nobleman

Gerhard, Count zur Mark (1378–1461) was the de facto ruler of the County of Mark between 1430 and 1461.

Dietrich was the third son of Count Adolf III of the Marck and Margaret of Jülich. His father had acquired the County of Cleves in 1368 and given this title to his eldest son Adolf. The second son Dietrich received the title of Count of Mark.

When Dietrich fell in battle in 1398, he was succeeded as Count of Mark by his elder brother Adolf. The ambitious Gerhard claimed a part of his father's territories for himself. In 1423, it came to an armed conflict between Adolf and Gerhard, who had allied himself with the Archbishop of Cologne.

Peace was signed between the two brothers in 1430, and confirmed in 1437. As a result, Gerhard ruled the largest part of Mark, but was to be succeeded by his nephew John.

Gerhard died in 1461 without children and the County of Mark and Duchy of Cleves were reunited again in a personal union under John I.

Gerhard, Count of Mark House of La Marck Born: ; Died: 1461
Preceded by Adolf IV	Count of Marck; 1430–1461	Succeeded by John I
