= Margaret of Jülich =

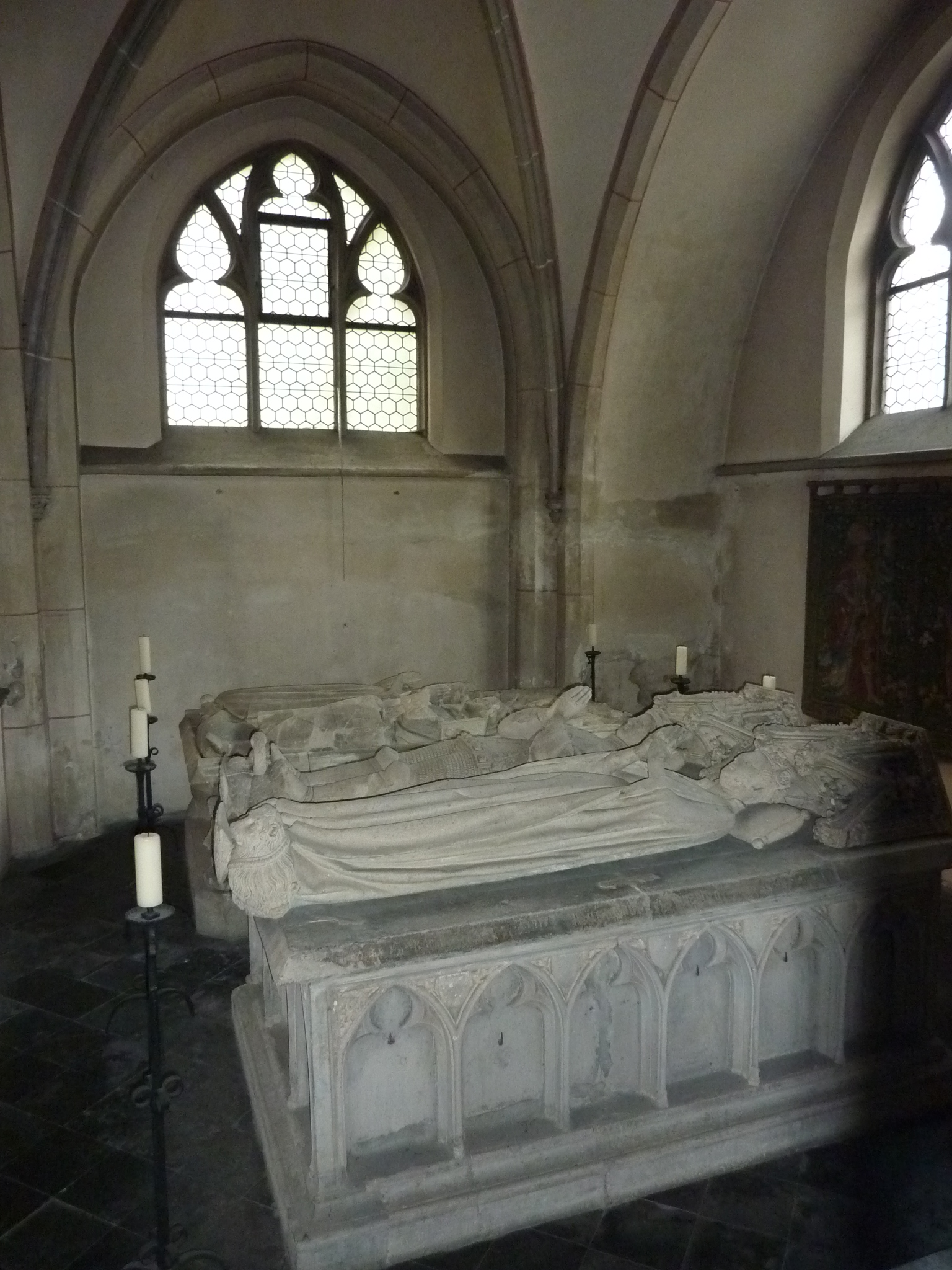
- Born: c. 1350
- Died: 10 October 1425 (aged 74–75)
- Noble family: House of Jülich
- Spouse: Adolf III of the Marck
- Issue: Mynta; Joanna; Adolph I, Duke of Cleves; Dietrich IX, Count of Mark; Gerhard, Count of Mark; Margaret of Cleves, Duchess of Bavaria-Straubing; Elisabeth of Cleves; Engelberta; Catherine
- Father: Gerhard VI of Jülich, Count of Berg and Ravensberg
- Mother: Margaret of Ravensberg

Margaret of Jülich (c. 1350 – 10 October 1425) was the daughter of Duke Gerhard VI of Jülich and Margaret of Ravensberg.

== Marriage and children ==
In 1369, she married Adolf III of the Marck. They had 16 children, at least five of whom did not survive infancy.

- Mynta (b. c. 1369)
- Joanna (b. c. 1370), abbess of Hörde
- Adolph (1373–1448), succeeded his father in Cleves and later also in the Marck.
- Dietrich (1374–1398), succeeded his father in the Marck.
- Gerhard (d. 1461), also Adolph as count of the Marck
- Margaret (1375–1411), married in 1394 Albert I, Duke of Bavaria (d. 1404)
- Elisabeth (1378–1439), married Reinold of Valkenburg (d. 1396) and Stephen III, Duke of Bavaria
- Engelberta (d. 1458), married Frederick IV of Moers (1376–1448)
- Catherine (c. 1395 – 1459)

Margaret of Jülich House of Jülich Born: c. 1350 Died: 10 October 1425
Preceded by Margaret of Cleves	Lady of Amstelveen and Nieuwer-Amstel; 1411-1411	Succeeded by Catherine of Cleves
