= Karl Harst =

German diplomat (1492–1563)

Karl Harst (1492–1563) was a sixteenth-century Alsatian diplomat of the Duchy of Cleves and humanist. He was acquainted with Erasmus and adopted Erasism, being his assistant and courier.

== Biography ==
In 1492, Harst was born in the Free City of Wissembourg (see Wissembourg), Holy Roman Empire. He was educated in Cologne, Orléans, and Leuven.

Between 1524 and 1526, he was Erasmus's assistant; he was sent to Italy, the Low Countries, and the Kingdom of England. In 1526, he sent to Italy to retrieve a Greek manuscript of John Chrysostom's Homilies on Acts. This venture was supported by Reginald Pole due to Erasmus's connection to him and was ultimately successful. From Greek manuscripts collected by Harst and Hieronymus Froben, Erasmus published Lucubrationes in March 1527.

Since 1530, Harst was in service of the Duke of Cleves. In a 1539 letter from Johannes Altenanus to Bonifacius Amerbach, Harst was described as their friend and John III, Duke of Cleves's ambassador to Charles V, Holy Roman Emperor in Habsburg Spain. He was representative in London during the marriage of Henry VIII of England and his fourth wife, Anne of Cleves in 1540 and remained there until 1544.

== Bibliography ==
- Estes, James M. (1999). "Erasmianism: Idea and Reality, ed. M. E. H. N. Mout, H. Smolinsky, and J. Trap-man (Koninklijke Nederlandse Akademie van Wetenschappen, Verhandelingen, Afd. Letterkunde, Nieuwe Reeks, deel 174). North-Holland: Amsterdam/ Oxford/New York/Tokyo, 1997. vi + 202 pp. ISBN 0-444-85821-0". Nederlands Archief voor Kerkgeschiedenis / Dutch Review of Church History. 79 (2): 244–249. doi:10.1163/002820399X00061.
- Erasmus, Desiderius (2020). Collected works of Erasmus. Toronto. ISBN 9781487532833.
- Kusukawa, Sachiko (30 May 2019). Ad Vivum?: Visual Materials and the Vocabulary of Life-Likeness in Europe before 1800. Leiden: Brill. ISBN 9789004393998.
- Kennerley, Sam (2023). The Reception of John Chrysostom in Early Modern Europe: Translating and Reading a Greek Church Father from 1417 to 1624. Berlin. ISBN 9783110708905.
- Miller, Clarence H. (March 1994). "Thomas More's Letters to Frans van Cranevelt, including Seven Recently Discovered Autographs: Latin Text, English Translation, and Facsimiles of the Originals". Moreana. 31 (Number 117) (1): 3–66. doi:10.3366/more.1994.31.1.4.
- Starkey, David (2003). Six wives : the queens of Henry VIII (First U.S. ed.). New York. ISBN 978-0060005504.
