= Frederick I of Berg-Altena =

Count of Altena

Frederick I (German: Friedrich I.) (1173–1198) was a count of Berg-Altena, the later County of Mark.

Frederick was the son of Eberhard I, Count of Berg-Altena, and inherited the south-eastern territory of Altena. He married Alveradis von Krieckenbeck-Millendonk, daughter of Reiner von Krieckenbeck-Millendonk, and they had issue:

- Adolf I of Altena (c.1194–1249);
- Friedrich of Altena (fl. 1199).

== Literature ==
- Genealogische Handbuch des Adels, Gräfliche Häuser A Band II, 1955;
- W. Gf v. Limburg Stirum, "Stamtafel der Graven van Limburg Stirum", 's Gravenhage 1878;
- A.M.H.J. Stokvis, "Manuel d'Histoire, de Genealogie et de Chronologie de tous les États du Globe", Tome III, Leiden 1890-93;
- W. K. Prins v. Isenburg, "Stammtafeln zur Geschichte der Europaischen Staaten", 2. Aufl., Marburg/Lahn, 1953.

Frederick I of Berg-Altena House of La Marck Born: 1173 Died: 1198
Preceded by Eberhard I	Count of the Mark; 1180–1198	Succeeded by Adolf I
