= Agnes of Cleves =

Titular queen of Navarre from 1441 to 1448

Coat of arms of Agnes of Cleves as consort of Charles, Prince of Viana

Agnes of Cleves (1422–1448) was a daughter of Adolph I, Duke of Cleves and his second wife Marie of Burgundy, Duchess of Cleves, daughter of John the Fearless duke of Burgundy.

In 1439, Agnes married Charles, Prince of Viana. He had been bequeathed the kingdom of Navarre. His right to be King of Navarre had been recognised by the Cortes; but when his mother Blanche died in 1441, her husband King John II of Aragon had seized the kingdom to the exclusion of his son. Charles and Agnes had no children.

Agnes died on 6 April 1448, aged only 25 or 26. After Agnes' death, her husband decided to remarry with his choice being Infanta Catherine of Portugal. However, Charles died in 1461 before the marriage could take place.

Royal titles
Preceded by Eleanor of Castile	Queen consort of Navarre de iure 1441–1448	Succeeded by Juana Enriquez
