= Adolf II of Mark =

German nobleman

Adolph II of the Marck
- coat-of-arms of La Mark
- Died: 19/20 October 1347; Fröndenberg
- Noble family: House of La Marck
- Spouse: Margaret Countess of Cleves
- Issue: Engelbert III, Count of the Marck; Adolf III of the Marck
- Father: Engelbert II of the Marck
- Mother: Mechtild of Arenberg

Adolph II of the Marck (died 19/20 October 1347, Fröndenberg) was Count of the Marck.

He was the eldest son of Engelbert II of the Mark and Mechtild of Arenberg.

Adolph was betrothed to Irmgard of Cleves, daughter of Otto, Count of Cleves and his (second) wife Mechtild of Virneburg. After obtaining a papal dispensation Adolf was allowed to marry Margaret of Cleves, the daughter of Dietrich VIII, Count of Cleves and Margaret of Guelders.

Adolph and Margaret of Cleves had seven children:

- Engelbert III, Count of the Marck (28 Feb 1333 – Wetter, 22 Dec 1391). Married 1) Richardis of Jülich, 2) Elisabeth of Sponheim.
- Adolf III of the Marck (1334 – 7 Sep 1394, Cleves). Archbishop of Cologne 1363–1364. Later Count of Cleves and of the Marck
- Dietrich of the Marck (1336 – 25 May 1406). Bishop of Liège 1389, from which post he later resigned.
- Eberhard of the Marck (1341 – after 1360). Priest at Münster.
- Margareta of the Marck († 12 Sep 1409). Married John I, Count of Nassau-Siegen
- Mechtild of the Marck († after 18 Oct 1390). Married Eberhard of Isenburg-Grenzau.
- Elisabeth of the Marck married Gumprecht of Heppendorf.

Adolf II of Mark House of La Marck Died: 19/20 October 1347
Preceded by Engelbert II of the Mark	Count of the Mark; 1328–1347	Succeeded by Engelbert III of the Mark
