= Duchy of Cleves =

State of the Holy Roman Empire

Coordinates: 51°47′N 6°8′E

County (Duchy) of Cleves Grafschaft (Herzogtum) Kleve (German) Graafschap (Hertogdom) Kleef (Dutch)
- 1020–1795
- Banner of Cleves-Mark (Beyeren Armorial) Coat of arms

- Map of the Lower Rhenish–Westphalian Circle (around 1560), Duchy of Cleves highlighted in Red
- Status: State of the Holy Roman Empire
- Capital: Cleves
- Common languages: Kleverlandish; German
- Religion: Roman Catholic; Lutheran; Calvinist
- Government: Duchy
- Historical era: Middle Ages
  - Dietrich I first Count of Cleves: 1020
  - United with Mark: 1391
  - Raised to duchy: 1417
  - United with Jülich and Berg: → 1521
  - To Brandenburg: 1614
  - Annexed by France: 1795
  - Province of Jülich-Cleves-Berg: 1815
Preceded by	Succeeded by
Lower Lotharingia	Roer (department)

The Duchy of Cleves (German: Herzogtum Kleve; Dutch: Hertogdom Kleef) was a state of the Holy Roman Empire which emerged from the medieval Hettergau. It was situated in the northern Rhineland on both sides of the Lower Rhine, around its capital Cleves and the towns of Wesel, Kalkar, Xanten, Emmerich, Rees and Duisburg bordering the lands of the Prince-Bishopric of Münster in the east and the Duchy of Brabant in the west. Its history is closely related to that of its southern neighbours: the Duchies of Jülich and Berg, as well as Guelders and the Westphalian county of Mark. The Duchy was archaically known as Cleveland in English.

The duchy's territory roughly covered the present-day German districts of Cleves (northern part), Wesel and the city of Duisburg, as well as adjacent parts of the Limburg, North Brabant and Gelderland provinces in the Netherlands.

== History ==
In the early 11th century Emperor Henry II entrusted the administration of the Klever Reichswald, a large forested area around the Kaiserpfalz at Nijmegen directly subordinate to the Imperial rule, to local Lower Lorrainian nobles at Geldern and Kleve. A County of Cleves (German: Grafschaft Kleve; Dutch: Graafschap Kleef) was first mentioned in the 11th century. Dietrich I was the first Count of Cleves and reigned from 1092 through 1119. In 1283, Cleves fought in the War of the Limburg Succession and helped weaken the powerful Electorate of Cologne. In 1355 Zevenaar passed from the control of the Duchy of Guelders to the County of Cleves.

Upon the death of Count Johann in 1368, the fief was inherited by his nephew Adolf III of the Marck. Cleves and the Marck were finally ruled in personal union by the House of La Marck after Adolf's elder brother Count Engelbert III had died without issue in 1391. King Sigismund of Germany raised Count Adolph I to the status of a duke and a Prince of the Holy Roman Empire in 1417, and the county became a duchy.

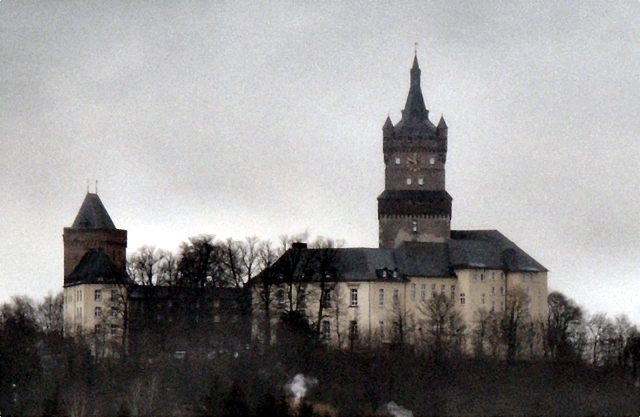
Schwanenburg Castle, Cleves

Quarterly, I and IV gules an escutcheon argent, overall an escarbuncle Or; II and III Or a fess chequy argent and gules.

The Cleves-Mark territories became one of the most significant estates of the Lower Rhenish–Westphalian Circle in 1500, rivaled by the Prince-Bishops of Münster. In 1511 John III of La Marck, son of Duke John II of Cleves, married Maria and her estates and titles were then merged with the Duchy of Cleves. Upon the death of his father-in-law Duke William IV, John inherited the fiefs of Jülich and Berg through his wife. When John III succeeded his father as Duke of Cleves in 1521, the states of Jülich, Berge, Cleves and Mark formed the United Duchies of Jülich-Cleves-Berg. His daughter Anne of Cleves (1515–1557) even became Queen Consort of England for a few months in 1540, as her brother William, duke since 1539, quarreled with Emperor Charles V over the possession of Guelders and sought support from King Henry VIII.

John William was the son of William and the last duke of Jülich-Cleves-Berge. He died without issue in 1609, and the War of the Jülich Succession broke out between the heirs of his two eldest sisters: Maria Eleonora, Duchess of Prussia, and Anna, Countess of Neuburg. Marie Eleonore's daughter Marie was married to the Margrave of Brandenburg; Neuburg was a cadet branch of the House of Wittelsbach. According to the 1614 Treaty of Xanten, Brandenburg received Cleves-Mark and Neuburg received Jülich-Berg. The Hohenzollern margraves thereby got a first foothold in the Rhineland; however, large parts of the Duchy of Cleves were occupied by the United Provinces until the Franco-Dutch War in 1672. Finally incorporated into Brandenburg-Prussia by the Great Elector Frederick William I of Brandenburg in 1666 and part of the Kingdom of Prussia after 1701, Cleves was occupied by French forces in the Seven Years' War (1757–1762).

In the 1795 Peace of Basel the Duchy of Cleves west of the Rhine and Wesel was ceded to France, and became part of the French département of the Roer. The rest of the duchy was occupied between 1803 and 1805, and became part of the puppet-state Grand Duchy of Berg. In 1815, after the defeat of Napoleon, the duchy became part of the Prussian Province of Jülich-Cleves-Berg, which was combined with the Grand Duchy of the Lower Rhine to form the Prussian Rhine Province in 1822. The cities Gennep, Zevenaar, and Huissen became part of the United Kingdom of the Netherlands as a result of the 1815 Congress of Vienna.

== Rulers of Cleves ==
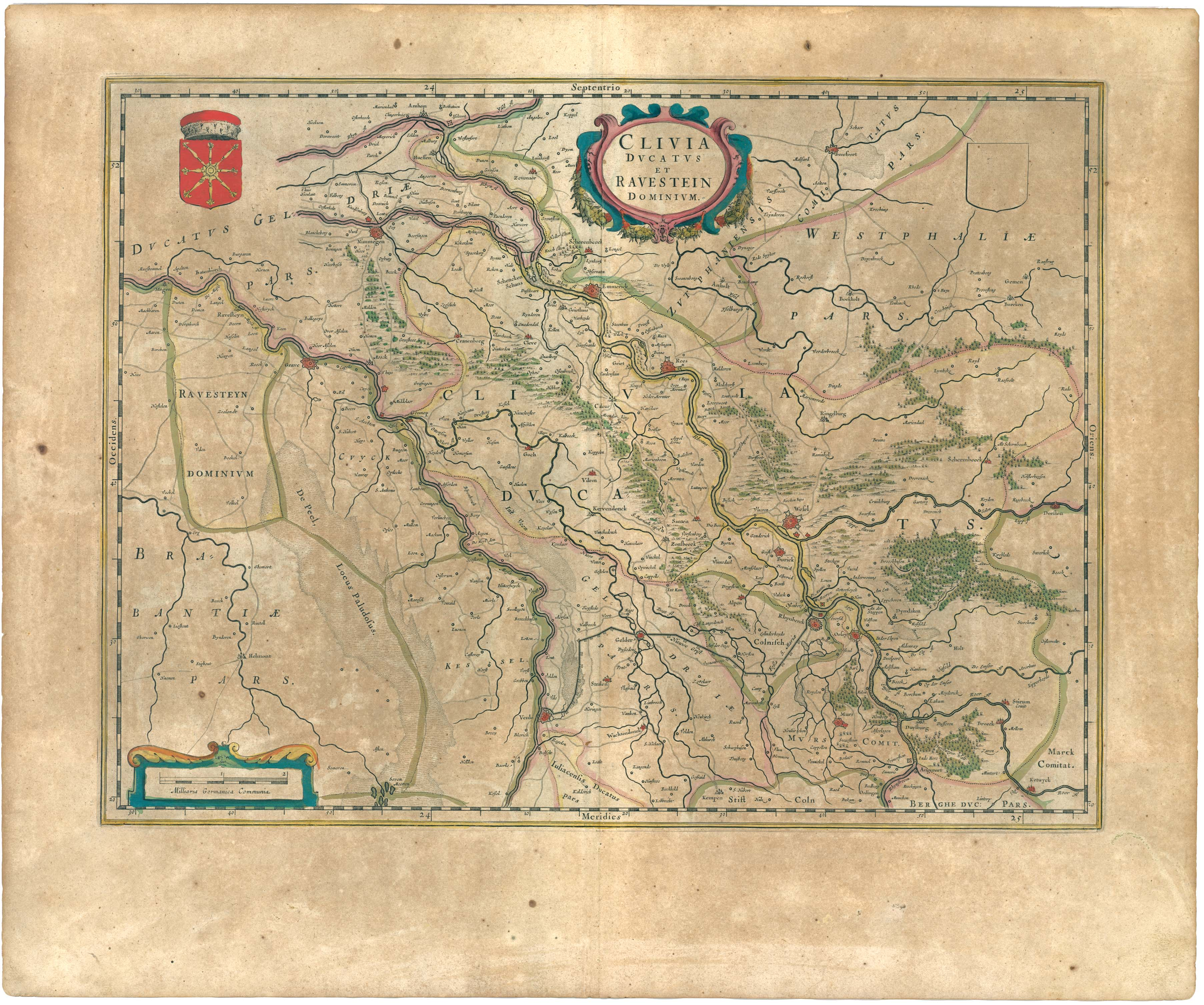
map of the Duchy of Cleves and Ravenstein domain from Theater of the World, or a New Atlas of Maps and Representations of All Regions, edited by Willem and Joan Blaeu, 1645

=== Counts of Cleves ===
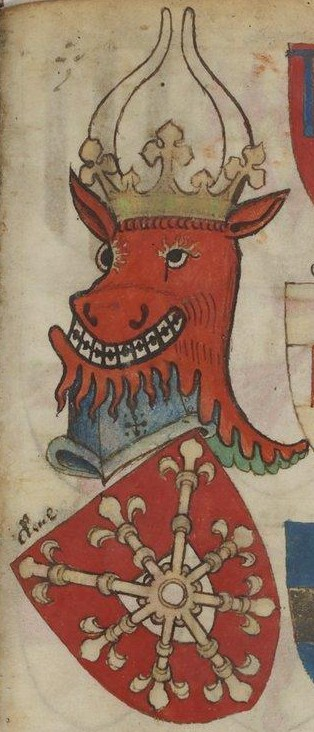
Old Cleves family coat of arms

==== House of Wassenberg ====
The House of Cleves considers itself to be descended from Rutger von Antoing, a Flemish nobleman. He was enfeoffed of imperial property near Kleve in 1020, and Tomburg Castle some time after. The first documented lord from the House of Cleves is Dietrich, numbered variously as II or III, in 1092.

- 1092–1117/8 Dietrich II or III
- 1117–1134 Arnold I, his son. Either he or Arnold II married Ida, daughter of Count Gottfried von Löwen
- 1134–1150 Arnold II
- 1150–1172 Dietrich III [IV]. Married Aleidis von Sulzbach
- 1172–1193 Dietrich IV [V]. Married Margarete von Holland
- 1193–1202 Arnold III. Married Aleidis von Heinsberg
- 1202–1260 Dietrich V [VI]
- 1260–1275 Dietrich VI [VII]
- 1275–1305 Dietrich VII [VIII]
- 1305–1310 Otto I the Peaceable
- 1310–1347 Dietrich VIII [IX] the Pious
- 1347–1368 Johann

==== House of La Marck ====
- 1368–1394 Adolf III of the Marck
- 1394–1448 Adolph I, son of Adolf III

=== Dukes of Cleves ===
==== House of La Marck ====
- 1394–1448 Adolph I, Duke of Cleves
- 1448–1481 John I, son of Adolph I
- 1481–1521 John II the Pious, son of John I
- 1521–1539 John III the Peaceful, son of John II
- 1539–1592 William the Rich, son of John III
- 1592–1609 John William, son of William

=== Genealogy of the House of Berg in Cleves, Julich, Mark and Berg ===
Genealogy of the House of Berg in Cleves, Julich, Mark and Berg

House of Berg

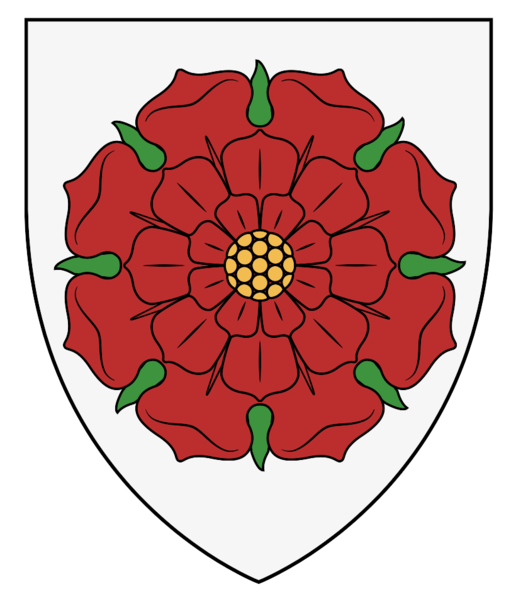
COUNT OR DUKE OF BERG	COUNT OR DUKE OF CLEVES	COUNT OR DUKE OF JŰLICH	ISENBERG/LIMBURG	COUNTS OF THE MARK	COUNTS OF RAVENSBURG	COUN OR DUKE OF GELDERLAND
Herman I Count Palatine of Lorraine; 985–996	Otto II; Emperor; 973–983
Adolf of Lorraine	Ezzo; Count Palatine of Lorraine; 996–1034 ancestor of Ezzonids	Mathilde d. 1025
Adolf	Richeza d. 1063	Mieszko II; Duke of Poland; 1025–1031; 1032–1034
Adolf I Count of Berg; 1077–c.1082	Casimir I the Restorer; Duke of Poland; 1034, rebellion 1038/40–1058
Adolf II of Berg; Count of Berg c.1082–c.1090	House of Wassenberg
Adolf III of Berg; Count of Berg c.1090–1106	Gerard I Flamens(ca. 970 - † bef. 1042)	Rütger I Count of Cleves d.<1092 House of Wassenberg
Adolf IV of Berg; Count of Berg; 1106–1161 or	Bruno II von Berg; Archbishop of Cologne; 1131–1137	Counts and dukes of Guelders	Arnold; Count of Cleves (<1092–c.1147)
Engelbert I Count of Berg; 1161–1189	Friedrich II of Berg; Archbishop of Cologne; 1156–1158	Adolf V d. 1148 (at Damascus)	Bruno III of Berg; Archbishop of Cologne; 1191–1193 d. 1196/1200	Eberhard I, Count of Berg-Altena (and IV); 1140 – 1180 eastern part of Berg becomes c. of Altena	Dietrich III; Count of Cleves c.1147–c.1172
Adolf VI; Count of Berg; 1189–1218	Engelbert II the Holy; Archbishop of Cologne; 1216–1225	Walter of Hennebach d.<1172	Arnold of Altena (1166 - 1209) 1st count of Isenberg, ancestor of counts of Limburg Hohenlimburg and Broich	Adolf of Altena (1168 - 1220) Archbishop of Cologne, 1193 - 1205, 1212 - 1214	Friedrich I of Altena (1173–1198) count of Berg-Altena, which renamed C. of Mark, ancestor of House of La Marck	Dietrich IV; Count of Cleves (1172–1193)
Irmgard of Berg d.1248	Henry IV (Arlon); Duke of Limburg; 1226–1246; 1/2 br. was Henry V, Count of Luxembourg anc. of Imperial House of Luxembourg	Eberhard d. 1218	Eberhard II (born 1180, died 1209) count of Altena and Isenberg	Frederick of Isenberg (1193 – 1226) attained re murder of Archb. of Engelbert II of Cologne	Dietrich III, Bishop of Münster (< 1180 - 1226)	Engelbert of Altena-Isenberg (< 1200 - 1250); B. of Osnabruck (1224-dep. 1226 for Engelbert II of Berg's assassination, rehab. 1238-1250)	Adolf I, Count of Mark (1194? - 1249)	Dietrich V Count of Cleves; 1193–1260
Adolf VII (1220 † 1259); Count of Berg	Waleran IV († 1279); Duke of Limburg	William III, Count of Jülich; 1207-1219 heir of uncle William II	Dietrich I of Isenberg before 1215–1301; 1st Count of Limburg (Counts of Limburg Hohenlimburg and Broich)	Friedrich of Altena (< 1220 - > 1243); C. of Limburg-Isenberg	Engelbert I, Count of Mark(d. 1277); C. of the Mark, 1249, C. of Altena, 1269	Otto, (1212-1269) C. of Altena	Dietrich VI; Count of Cleves; 1260–1275
Ermengarde († 1283)	Reginald I Count of Guelders (Wassenberg)	William IV, Count of Jülich (c. 1210 – 1278)	Johann of Isenberg-Limburg (< 1246 - < 1277)	Eberhard, Count of Mark (c. 1255–1308)	Dietrich VII (1256–1305); Count of Cleves,(1275–1305)
Adolf VIII of Berg († 1296) Count of Berg	William I († 1308) Count of Berg	Henry of Windeck († 1292)	Walram, Count of Jülich (1240/45 – 1297)	Gerhard V, C. of Jülich (bef 1250 – 1328), count 1297	from here desc. LIMBURG-STIRUM (see below)	Engelbert II, Count of Mark (1275 – 1328)	Adolf II (bishop of Liège) (1288 – 1344)	Dietrich VIII (c. 1291 – 1347); Count of Cleves (1311–1347)	Otto, Count of Cleves (1278 – 1310); Count of Cleves (1305–1311)	John (1293-1368); Count of Cleves (1347–1368)
Adolf IX of Berg († 1348) Count of Berg	Margaret of Berg-Windeck d.< 1339 m. Otto IV, Count of Ravensberg	Walram; Archbishop of Cologne; 1332–1349	William; V as count, I as margrave & duke (c. 1299 – 1361)	Eberhard I (d. about 1378), Count of Arenberg see below House of Marck-Arenberg/Bouillon/Lummey	Engelbert (1304–1368), Prince-Bishop of Liège 1345–1364, Archbishop of Cologne 1364–68	Adolf II, Count of Mark (d.1347)	Margaret of Cleves, Countess of the Marck (c. 1310 – after 1348)
Margaret of Ravensberg	Gerhard VI count of Berg, Ravensberg	William VI; II duke of Jülich ∞ Maria, Duchess of Guelders	Engelbert III (1333–1391), C. of the Mark, 1347	Adolf III (1334–1394), Absp. of Cologne, 1363-64, C. of Cleves, 1368
William VII of Jülich, 1st Duke of Berg duke of Berg, count of Ravensberg	William duke of Guelders, III of Jülich ∞ Katherine of Bavaria	Reinald IV duke of Guelders, Jülich	Joanna of Jülich ∞ John V lord of Arkel	Adolph I (1373–1448), his successor in Cleves, 1394 and also in Marck, 1398. Duke of Cleves, 1417	Dietrich (1374–1398), his successor in Marck.	Gerhard († 1461), de facto Count of the Marck, but not allowed to use the title.
Adolf (c. 1370 – 1437); Count of Ravensberg, 1395-1403; Duke of Berg, 1408; Duke of Jülich, 1423	William VIII (c. 1380 – 1428) count of Ravensberg, 1403	Marie of Harcourt (daughter of John VI count of Harcourt)	Maria van Arkel ∞ John II lord of Egmond	John I (1419–1481); Duke of Cleves, 1448; Count of the Mark, 1448/1461	Elizabeth of Nevers, daughter of John II, Count of Nevers(Valois-Burgundy)	Adolph of Cleves, Lord of Ravenstein (1425–1492) m. 1453, to Beatrice of Portugal
Rupert (d. 1431)	Gerhard VII duke of Jülich-Berg, count of Ravensberg	Arnold duke of Guelders; HOUSE OF EGMONT	John II (1458-1521); Duke of Cleves & Count of the Mark, 1521	Engelbert, Count of Nevers (1462-1506); Count of Nevers, 1491upon death of his maternal grandfather John II, Count of Nevers	Philip of Cleves (1467–1505); Bishop of Nevers, Amiens and Autun
William; IV duke of Jülich-Berg, count of Ravensberg ∞ Sibylle of Brandenburg
Maria of Jülich-Berg	John III (1490-1539); Duke of Cleves & Count of the Mark, 1511; Duke of Jülich & Berg, Count of Ravensberg, 1521; HOUSE OF LA MARCK	Adolf (1498–1525), appointed by his father's cousin Philip of Cleves, Lord of Ravenstein and Wijnendale, as his successor, but died before Philip did in 1528	Charles II, Count of Nevers (d.1521)m.Marie of Albret, Countess of Rethel
Sibylle d.1554	John Frederick I the Magnanimous; Elector of Saxony; 1532–1547 d.1554	Anne of Cleves d.1557	Henry VIII; King of England; 1509–1547; King of Ireland; 1541–1547	William I the Rich; Duke of Cleves–Jülich– Mark–Berg– Ravensberg; 1539–1592	Maria of Austria d.1581 d. of Ferdinand I, Holy Roman Emperor	Francis I Count of Nevers, 1521-39; Duke of Nevers, 1539-62
John William; Duke of Cleves–Jülich– Mark–Berg– Ravensberg; 1592–1609	Albert Frederick; Duke of Prussia; 1568–1618	Marie Eleonore (1550 – 1608)	Anna (1552 – 1632)	Philip Louis; C. Palatine/Duke of Neuburg; 1569–1614	Magdalena d.1633	John Casimir of Zweibrucken d.1604 Montferrat; 1631–1637	François II, Duke of Nevers (c. 1540 – 1563); French Prince étranger and general	Jacques, Duke of Nevers (c. 1544 – 1564) rench Prince étranger and general	Henriette of Cleves (1542 – 1601)	Louis de Gonzague, Duke of Nevers (1539 – 2 1595); French Prince étranger,soldier, governor
John Sigismund (1572 - 1619); Margrave & Elector of Brandenburg; 1608–1619; Duke of Prussia,1618–1619	Anna of Prussia (1576 – 1625) awarded prot. Cleves, Mark & Ravensberg 1614–1619 settlement	Magdalene Sibylle of Prussia (1586 –1659) m. John George I, Elector of Saxony	William Wolfgang; Count Palatine & Duke of Neuburg; 1614–1653 awarded Cath. Jülich & Berg, desc.	Augustus, Count Palatine of Sulzbach (1582–1632); Catholic, desc. eventual heirs and inheritors & Counts Palatine and Bavaria	John Casimir; Count Palatine of Zweibrücken d.1652	Charles I Gonzaga (1580 – 1637); Duke of Mantua and Duke of Montferrat from 1627
George William; Margrave & Elector of Brandenburg; Duke of Prussia; 1619–1640	John George II; Elector of Saxony; 1656–1680

== Notable people ==
- Anne of Cleves, Henry VIII’s fourth wife, married in 1540
- Karl Harst, sixteenth-century diplomat
