= Margaret of Cleves, Duchess of Bavaria-Straubing =

Margaret of Cleves (c. 1375–14 May 1411) was a German noblewoman. A daughter of Adolph III, Count of Mark and Margaret of Jülich (making her sister to Adolph I), in 1394 she became the second wife of Albert I, Duke of Bavaria. Albert's first wife Margaret of Brieg, with whom he had seven children, had died in 1386.

Margaret of Cleves and Albert did not have any children. The couple held court in The Hague. Margaret is well known for her contributions as patron of the arts - especially for the renowned Book of Hours, the Hours of Margaret of Cleves.

Preceded by Margaret of Brieg	Duchess of Bavaria; 1394–1404	Succeeded by Margaret of Burgundy
