= Adolf IX of Berg =

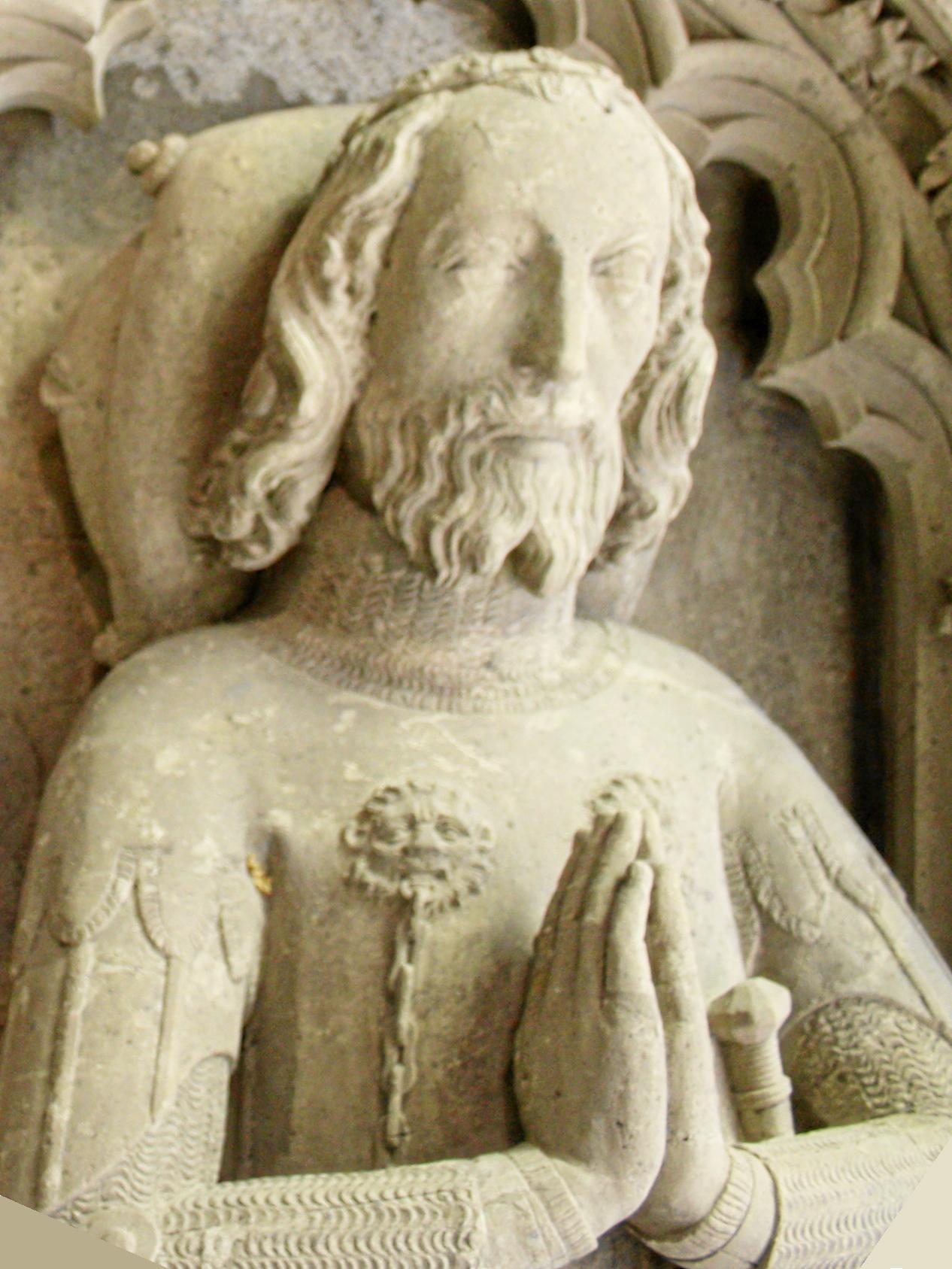
Adolf IX of Berg

Adolf IX of Berg (also referred to as Adolf VI) (c. 1280 – 3 April 1348) was the eldest son of Henry of Berg, Lord of Windeck and Agnes of the Mark.

In 1308, Adolf succeeded as Count of Berg upon the death of his childless uncle William I of Berg. Adolf was an important and loyal supporter of Ludwig IV of Bavaria, helping him since 1314 in the war of succession. As a result of Adolf's 1312 marriage to Agnes of Cleves, he received the Rhine customs of Duisburg as a dowry and these were confirmed as an imperial fief by Emperor Louis in 1314. He continued the constant feuds between the House of Berg and the Archbishops of Cologne. In 1327/28, he joined Louis on his trip to Rome where he was crowned as Emperor. Adolf received the privilege to mint silver which he did at Wipperfürth. In 1337 Adolf joined the English-German Alliance which caused the start of the Hundred Years' War.

In 1312 Adolf was married to Agnes of Cleves (c. 1295 – aft. 1361), daughter of Dietrich VII, Count of Cleves and Margaret of Habsburg-Kiburg. He died on 3 April 1348 without children and was succeeded by his only surviving niece, Margaret of Ravensberg by right of her mother, and her husband Gerhard VI of Jülich as Count and Countess of Berg.

Thus, the Counties of Berg and Ravensburg came in 1348 under the house of Jülich, and were in 1437 united with the County of Jülich. In 1511 all three passed into the house of Cleves.

| Preceded by William I | Count of Berg; 1308–1348 | Succeeded by Gerhard VI of Jülich |
