= Dietrich, Count of Mark =

Count of Mark from 1393 to 1398

Dietrich (1374–1398) was the Count of Mark from 1393 until 1398.

Dietrich was the second son of Count Adolf III of the Marck and Margaret of Jülich.

Dietrich II studied at the University of Montpellier from 1353 to 1357.

His father had acquired the County of Cleves in 1368 and reserved this title for his eldest son Adolph to succeed him after his death. Dietrich already received the title of Count of Mark in 1393, when his father was still alive. When Dietrich fell in battle in 1398, he was succeeded by his elder brother Adolph, who had become Count of Cleves in 1394. Thus the County of Mark and the County of Cleves were reunited again.

Dietrich, Count of Mark House of La Marck Born: 1374 Died: 1398
Preceded by Adolf III	Count of Marck; 1393–1398	Succeeded by Adolf IV
