= Johann, Count of Cleves =

14th Century Count of Cleves

Johann (1293-1368), was the last Count of Cleves, from 1347 through 1368. Upon his death in 1368, the counties of Cleves and Count of Mark were united.

Johann was the youngest son of Dietrich VII, Count of Cleves and his second wife Margaret of Habsburg. He succeeded in 1347 his brother Dietrich VIII, Count of Cleves who had died without sons.

He married Mechteld of Guelders († 1384), daughter of Reginald II, Duke of Guelders, but the marriage remained childless. After his death, the County of Cleves went to Adolf III of the Marck and so to the Counts of Marck.

Preceded by Dietrich VIII	Count of Cleves; 1347–1368	Succeeded by Adolf III of the Marck
