= Adolph I, Duke of Cleves =

German nobleman

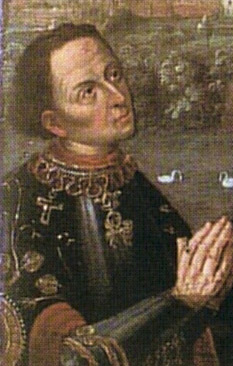
- Adolph I, Duke of Cleves
- Born: 2 August 1373
- Died: 23 September 1448 (aged 75); Carthusian monastery at Wesel
- Noble family: La Marck
- Spouses: Agnes of the Palatinate; Marie of Burgundy
- Issue: Margaret, Duchess of Bavaria; Catherine, Duchess of Guelders; John I, Duke of Cleves; Elisabeth, Countess of Schwarzburg-Blankenburg; Agnes, Queen of Navarre; Helen, Duchess of Brunswick-Lüneburg; Adolph, Lord of Ravenstein; Marie, Duchess of Orléans
- Father: Adolph III, Count of Mark
- Mother: Margaret of Jülich

Adolph I of Cleves (German: Adolf I) (2 August 1373 – 23 September 1448) was the second Count of Cleves and the fourth Count of Mark.

== Life ==
Adolph was the son of Adolph III, Count of Mark, and Margaret of Jülich (and thus the brother of Margaret of Cleves).

After his father's death in 1394, he became Count of Cleves. In 1397 he defeated his uncle William VII of Jülich, 1st Duke of Berg in the battle of Kleverhamm and became Lord of Ravenstein.

When his brother Dietrich IX, Count of Mark died in battle in 1398, he also became Count of Mark. Adolph further expanded his influence by marrying a daughter of the Duke of Burgundy. As a result, Cleves was raised to a Duchy by the Holy Roman Emperor, Sigismund, in 1417.

From 1409 onwards he faced opposition from his younger brother Gerhard, who claimed the County of Mark. By 1423, their dispute resulted in an armed conflict, with Gerhard allying himself with the Archbishop of Cologne.

A peace was signed between the two brothers in 1430 and confirmed in 1437. As a result, Gerhard ruled the largest part of Mark, but was to be succeeded by his nephew John. He was not allowed to call himself Count of Mark, but has to use the title Count zur Mark. After Gerhard's death in 1461, the County of Mark and the Duchy of Cleves were reunited again.

coat-of-arms of La Mark

coat-of-arms of Cleves

== Marriage and children ==
Shortly before the year 1400 Adolph married Agnes, daughter of Rupert of Germany and Elisabeth of Nuremberg. Agnes died a year later with no issue.
In 1406 Adolf married Marie of Burgundy, daughter of John the Fearless and Margaret of Bavaria. They had the following issue:

- Margarethe (23 February 1416 – 20 May 1444) married as her first husband William III, Duke of Bavaria on 11 May 1433; and as her second husband Ulrich V, Count of Württemberg on 29 January 1441
- Catherine (25 May 1417 – 10 February 1479) married Arnold, Duke of Guelders, on 23 July 1430
- John (1419–1481), succeeded as Duke of Cleves
- Elisabeth (1420–1488) married on 15 July 1434 Henry XXVI, of Schwarzburg-Blankenburg (1418–1488)
- Agnes (1422–1446) married Charles IV, King of Navarre, on 30 September 1439 in Olite
- Helen (1423–1471) married on 12 February 1436 Henry "the Peaceful", Duke of Brunswick-Lüneburg (c. 1411–1473)
- Adolph (1425–1492) married on 13 May 1453, to Beatrice of Portugal (1435–1462), daughter of Peter, Duke of Coimbra
- Mary (1426–1487) married Charles, Duke of Orléans; became parents of Louis XII, King of France

== Sources ==
- Boulton, D'Arcy Jonathan Dacre (2000). The Knights of the Crown: The Monarchical Orders of Knighthood in Later Medieval Europe, 1325-1520. The Boyell Press. ISBN 9780851157955.
- Mundy, John Hine; Woody, Kennerly M., eds. (1961). The Council of Constance: The Unification of the Church. Translated by Loomis, Louise Ropes. Columbia University Press.

Adolph I, Duke of Cleves House of La Marck Born: 2 August 1373 Died: 23 September 1448
Preceded by Dietrich IX, Count of Mark	Count of Mark; 1398–1448/ de facto 1430	Succeeded by Gerhard, Count of Mark
Preceded by Adolf III, Count of Cleves	Count of Cleves; 1394–1417	Raised to Duchy
New creation	Duke of Cleves; 1417–1448	Succeeded by John I, Duke of Cleves
