= Johann of Isenberg-Limburg =

Johann of Isenberg-Limburg of Limburg (born before 1246, died before 1277), son of Dietrich I of Isenberg. was a German aristocrat. He married Agnes von Wildenberg; they had three children:

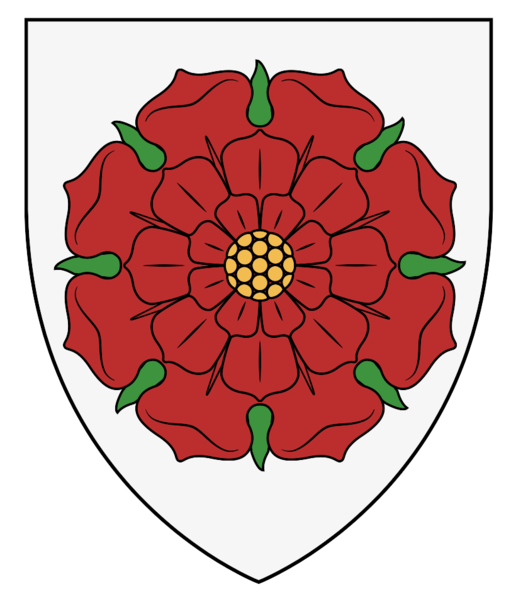
Coat of arms county Isenberg

- Dietrich II lord of Limburg-Styrum (born before 1277, died 22 March 1328)
- Friedrich, a canon in Cologne (born before 1277, died 1321);;
- Mechtild, (born before 1277, died 1306) married 1286 Egbert von Almelo.

== Literature ==
- Hoederath, H.T. Der Fall des Hauses Isenberg 1225/1226 . In rechtsgeschichterlicher und soziologischer Schau, 1954 Zeitschrift der Savigny stiftung fur Rechtsgeschichte. Kanonistische Abteilung
- Aders, G. Die Grafen (von Limburg zu Hohenlimburg) und die Herrn von Limburg zu Styrum aus dem Haus Berg-Altena-Isenberg. Zeitschift 'Der Marker" 1956 blad 7.
- Berg, A. Lineage counts of Limburg Hohenlimburg and Linage Lords of Limburg-Styrum. Archive fur Sippenforschung Heft 14. Jahrgang 30. Mai 1964.
- Korteweg, K.N. Dietrich I Graf von Limburg Hohenlimburg. His two descendant lines Lords of Limburg Styrum and counts of Limburg Hohenlimburg. De Nederlandse Leeuw Jaargang LXXXI no.8. August 1964. Pages 266-276.
