= Margaret of Ravensberg =

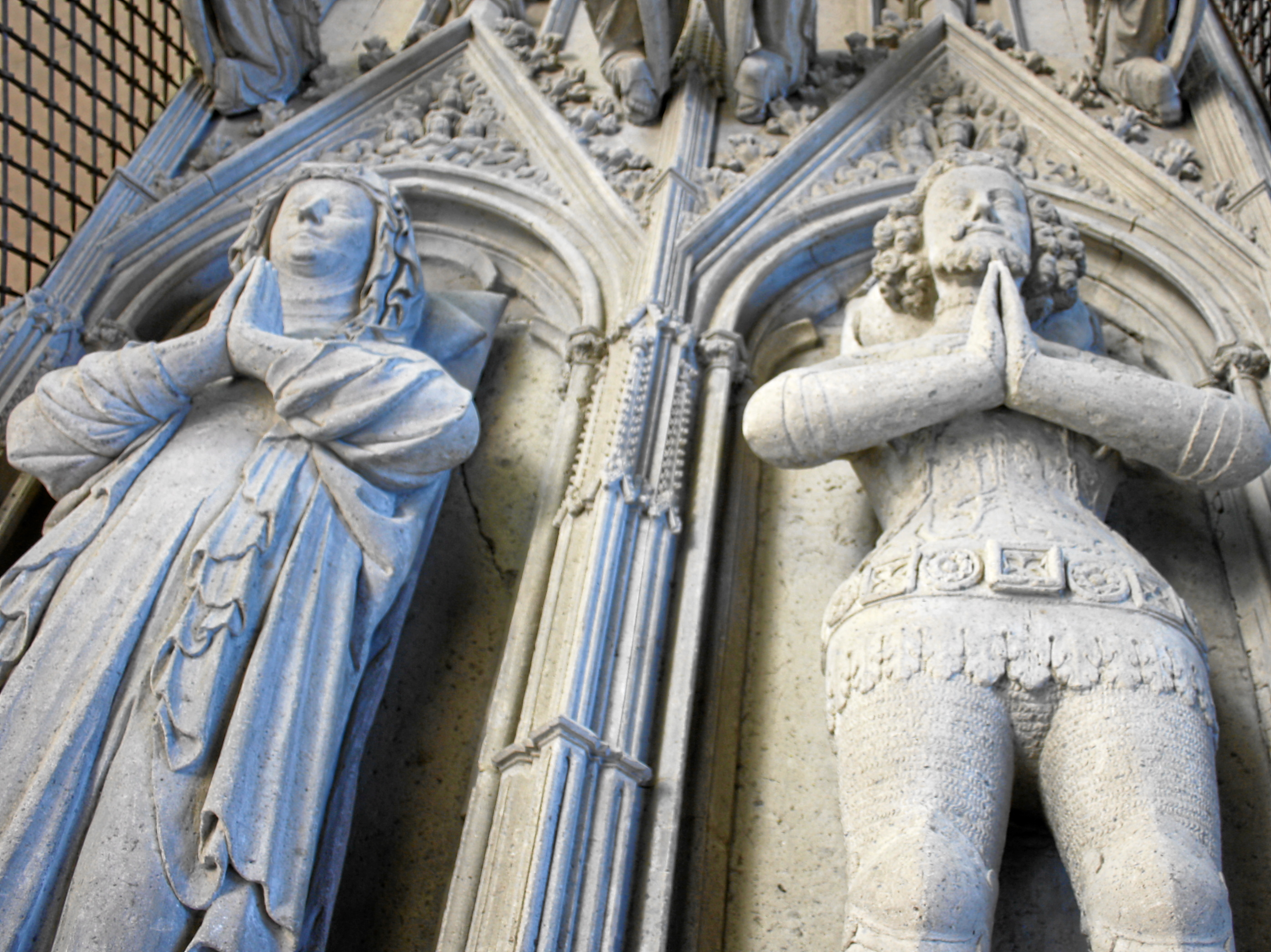
Grave of Gerhard I. Count of Jülich-Berg and his wife Margarete.

Margaret of Ravensberg (c. 1320 – 13 February 1389) was the daughter and heiress of Otto IV, Count of Ravensberg and Margaret of Berg-Windeck.

Margaret's father, Otto, had no sons, so at his death in 1328, the County of Ravensberg went to his younger brother Bernhard. However, when Bernhard died in 1346 without issue, Margaret became the heiress of Ravensberg, her elder sister and only sibling, Hedwig, having died in 1336. Then, when Margaret's uncle, Adolf IX of Berg, died in 1348 without issue, Margaret also inherited Berg by right of her mother, since Margaret was Adolf's only surviving niece.

As a result of her marriage to Gerhard VI of Jülich, Berg and Ravensberg passed into the house of Jülich where they remained until 1511 when they passed into the house of Cleves.

== Family and children ==
Margaret married Gerhard VI of Jülich. They had three children:

1. Elizabeth (c. 1346 – aft 1388), married Henry VI, Count of Waldeck
2. William (c.1348 – 1408)
3. Margaret (c. 1350 – 1425/29), married Adolf I of Kleve-Mark

Anne of Cleves is one of her descendants.
