= Margaret of Cleves, Countess of the Marck =

Margaret of Cleves
- Born: c. 1310
- Died: after 1348
- Noble family: House of Cleves
- Spouse: Adolf II of the Marck
- Issue Detail: Engelbert III, Count of Mark; Adolf III, Count of Mark
- Father: Dietrich VIII, Count of Cleves
- Mother: Margaret of Guelders

Margaret of Cleves, also spelled Margaretha or Margarethe (c. 1310 – after 1348) was the wife of Count Adolf II of the Marck and mother of Adolf III of the Marck. She was a daughter of Count Dietrich VIII of Cleves and Margaret of Guelders, who was a daughter of Reginald I of Guelders.

On 15 March 1332, she married Count Adolf II of the Marck. In 1333, her father issued an inheritance law, which said that after his death, the County of Cleves should fall to Margaret and her sisters Elisabeth and Maria. His younger brother John objected, and in 1338, this law was repealed.

Adolf II, Margaret's husband, died in 1346, before her father died. Her eldest son, Engelbert III succeeded as Count of the Marck. After her father, Count Dietrich VIII of Cleves, died on 7 July 1347, Margaret and her sons Engelbert III and Adolf III tried to secure the Cleves territory. Initially, they were supported by her cousin, Reginald III of Guelders. Nevertheless, her uncle, Count John, prevailed.

John died in 1368. After his death, the Count of the Marck could finally assert their right to inherit Cleves. Adolf succeeded as Count, her third son Dietrich received most of the holdings on the right bank of the Rhine.

== Issue ==
Adolph and Margaret of Cleves had seven children:

- Engelbert III (28 Feb 1333-Wetter 22 Dec 1391), married:
  1. in 1354 to Richardis of Jülich (d. 1360), a daughter of William V, Duke of Jülich
  2. in 1381 Elisabeth of Sponheim-Sayn (d. 1416), a daughter of Count Simon III of Vianden
- Adolf III (1334 - 7 Sep 1394, Cleves), Archbishop of Cologne 1363-1364, later Count of Cleves and Count of the Marck
- Dietrich (1336-25 May 1406), bishop of Liège 1389, from which post he later resigned.
- Eberhard (1341-after 1360), priest at Münster.
- Margareta (-12 Sep 1409), married John I, Count of Nassau-Siegen
- Mechtild (-after 18 Oct 1390), married Eberhard of Isenburg-Grenzau.
- Elisabeth, married Gumprecht of Heppendorf.
