= Gerhard, Count of Berg and Ravensberg =

14th Century Count of Berg and Ravensberg

Gerhard VI of Jülich, Count of Berg and Ravensberg
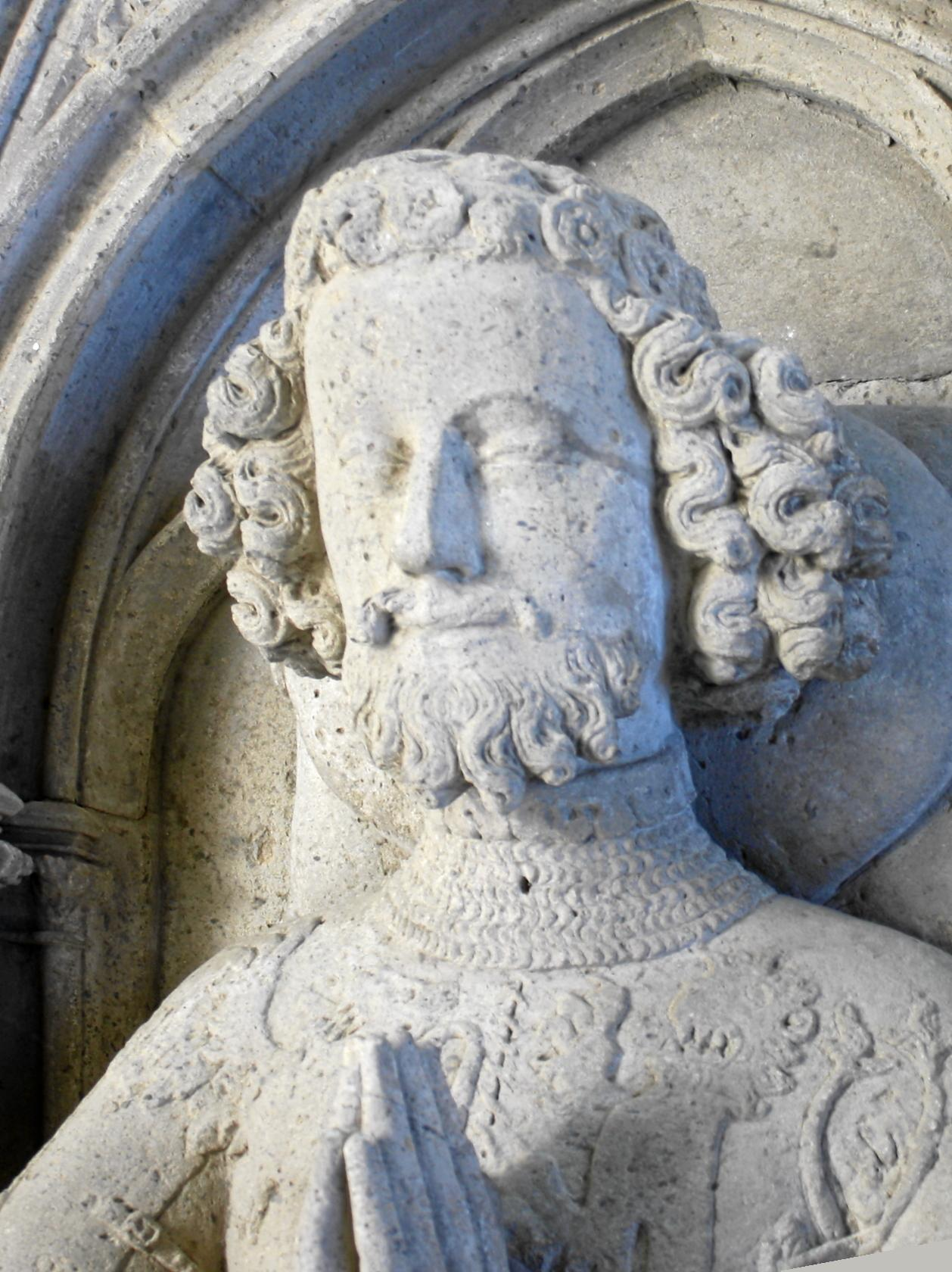
- Altenberg Grab GerhardI1
- Born: c. 1325
- Died: 18 May 1360; Düsseldorf
- Buried: Altenberg Abbey
- Noble family: House of Jülich
- Spouse: Margaret of Ravensberg
- Issue: Elisabeth; William II of Berg; Margaret of Jülich
- Father: William V, Duke of Jülich
- Mother: Joanna of Hainaut

Gerhard VI of Jülich, Count of Berg and Ravensberg (c. 1325 – 18 May 1360) was the son of William V, Duke of Jülich and Joanna of Hainaut.

Gerhard was betrothed in 1333 (renewed 1342) to Margaret of Guelders, daughter of Rainald II of Guelders and Sophia Betrout. However, this marriage was never consummated, likely due either to Rainald's death in 1343 or Margaret's death in 1344. Gerhard was subsequently married about 1344 to Margaret of Ravensberg, heiress of Berg and Ravensberg (died 13/19 February 1389), daughter of Otto IV, Count of Ravensberg and Margaret of Berg. Margaret's father Otto had no sons so at his death in 1328, the County of Ravensberg went to his brother Bernhard. However, when Bernhard died in 1346 without issue, Margaret became the heir of Ravensberg, her elder sister Hedwig having died in 1336.
Then, when Margaret's uncle, Count Adolf IX of Berg, died in 1348 without issue, Margaret also inherited Berg by right of her mother. Thus, the titles to Berg and Ravensberg came into the house of Jülich where they remained until 1511 when they passed into the house of Cleves.

Gerhard completed several ineffective protective alliances and stood against the Archbishop of Cologne. He won Hardenberg, Neviges, Langenberg, Remangen and Kaiserswerth, among others.

Gerhard died 18 May 1360 in a tournament in Düsseldorf and is buried with his wife in the Altenberg Abbey.

== Family and children ==
Gerhard and his wife Margaret of Ravensberg had three children:

1. Elisabeth (c. 1346 – aft. 1388), married Henry VI, Count of Waldeck
2. William (c. 1348 – 1408), his successor
3. Margaret (c. 1350 – 1425/29), married Adolph I of Cleves-Mark

Gerhard, Count of Berg and Ravensberg House of Jülich Born: c. 1325 Died: 18 May 1360
Preceded by Adolf IX	Count of Berg (de jure uxoris); 1348–1360	Succeeded by William VII
Preceded by Bernard of Ravensberg	Count of Ravensberg (de jure uxoris); 1348–1360	Succeeded by William VII
