= Engelbert I of Mark =

Count of the Mark

Engelbert I, Count of the Mark
- Coat-of-arms of La Mark
- Died: 16 November 1277; Castle of Bredevoort
- Buried: Cappenberg Abbey
- Noble family: House of La Marck
- Spouses: Kunigunde of Blieskastel; Elisabeth of Valkenburg
- Issue: Eberhard II, Count of the Mark
- Father: Adolf I, Count of the Mark
- Mother: Irmgard of Guelders

Engelbert I, Count of the Mark (died 16 November 1277 at Castle of Bredevoort) was a German nobleman. He was the ruling Count of the Mark from 1249 until his death.

== Life ==
He succeeded his father, Adolf I as the ruling count in 1249. His brother Otto, who had been a canon in Liège, returned to the lay state after their father's death and claimed a share of the inheritance. Engelbert ceded the castles at Altena and Blankenstein and the surrounding land to Otto. He was afraid that this might be the first step in the fragmentation of the county. However, Otto died without a male heir in 1262, and his possessions fell back to Engelbert.

Early in his reign, a feud broke out between Engelbert II and his namesake, Archbishop Engelbert II of Cologne. They fought a number of battles and their troops devastated each other's territory; in 1265, they made peace. In 1262 Engelbert and William IV, Count of Jülich, came to the assistance of the Teutonic Knights during the Siege of Königsberg.

Engelbert I was married twice. His first wife was Kunigunde of Blieskastel and they had one daughter Agnes of Mark who married Henry of Berg, Lord of Windeck about 1272. His second wife, Elisabeth of Valkenburg, was a niece of the Archbishop of Cologne. This marriage ensured peace between Cologne and the Mark.

In 1274, Archbishop Engelbert II of Cologne died. His successor, Siegfried II of Westerburg tried to expand his influence in Westphalia and the Rheinland. This led to a conflict with the other rulers in the area. In 1277, they formed an alliance, led by Bishop Simon I of Paderborn. Engelbert II of the Mark joined this alliance.

Later that year, he was attacked by Herman of Lohn while travelling near Tecklenburg. He was seriously wounded in the attack, and died of his wounds on 16 November 1277, at the Castle of Bredevoort, where he was held captive by Herman. He was buried in Cappenberg Abbey and was succeeded by his son

- Eberhard II.

Engelbert I of Mark House of La Marck Died: 16 November 1277
Preceded by Adolf I	Count of the Mark; 1249–1277	Succeeded by Eberhard II
