= War of the Limburg Succession =

Dynastic conflict in the Duchy of Limburg from 1283 to 1289

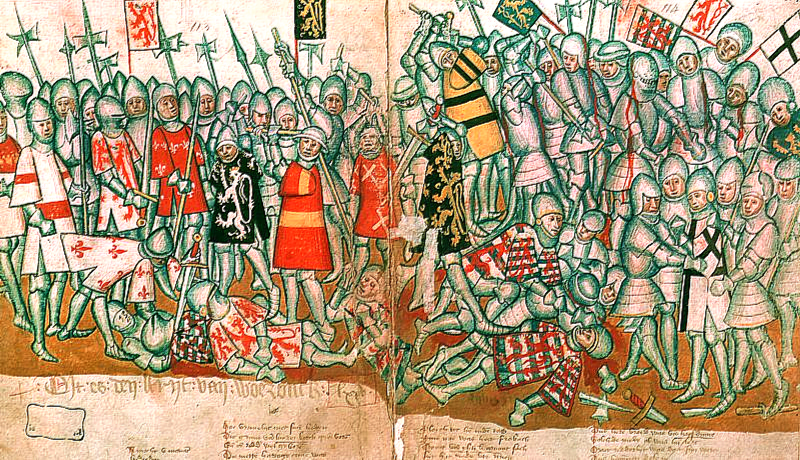
- 15th century depiction of the Battle of Worringen from a manuscript of Brabantsche Yeesten (Royal Library of Belgium)
Date	1283–1289
Location	Duchy of Limburg
Result	Victory for the Duke of Brabant and his allies

Belligerents
Electorate of Cologne; County of Guelders; County of Luxembourg; Lordship of Ligny; County of Nassau	Duchy of Brabant; County of Berg; County of Mark; County of Loon; County of Jülich; County of Tecklenburg; County of Waldeck

Commanders and leaders
Siegfried II of Westerburg; Reginald I of Guelders; Henry VI of Luxembourg †; Waleran I of Ligny †; Adolf of Nassau	John I of Brabant; Adolf VIII of Berg; Eberhard II of Mark; Arnold V Walram of Jülich; Otto III of Tecklenburg; Otto I of Waldeck

The War of the Limburg Succession was a conflict between 1283 and 1289 for the succession in the Duchy of Limburg. The war was fought between Reginald I of Guelders, who married the daughter and heiress of the last Duke of Limburg, and the Duke of Brabant.

== Causes ==
The cause of the War of the Limburg Succession was the death of Waleran IV, Duke of Limburg in 1280, and his only daughter Ermengarde of Limburg in 1283. Waleran IV had no sons and Ermengarde had no children. Ermergarde had married Reginald I of Guelders, who now claimed the Duchy of Limburg. However, Waleran's nephew Adolf VIII of Berg, son of his elder brother Adolf VII of Berg, also claimed the Duchy. Unable to assert his claims, he sold them in 1283 to the mighty John I, Duke of Brabant.

== Course of war ==
Between 1283 and 1288, several smaller confrontations occurred between both sides, none of them decisive. Meanwhile, most of the other local powers chose sides. Siegfried II of Westerburg, the Archbishop of Cologne and ruler of the Electorate of Cologne, traditional enemy of the Duke of Brabant, forged an alliance with Reginald I, joined by Henry VI, Count of Luxembourg, and his brother Waleran I of Luxembourg, Lord of Ligny, as well as by Adolf, King of Germany. On the other side the Counts of Mark took the chance to affirm their independence from the Archbishop of Cologne and together with the Counts of Loon, Tecklenburg, and Waldeck allied with Brabant and Berg. The citizens of the City of Cologne, eager to emancipate themselves from the Archbishop's rule, also joined this alliance.

After the decisive Battle of Worringen in 1288, won by Duke John I of Brabant and his allies, the Duchy of Limburg came in the possession of the Duke of Brabant. The City of Cologne gained its independence from the Archbishopric and finally the status of an Imperial city in 1475.
