= Henry of Berg, Lord of Windeck =

13th Century German nobleman

Henry of Berg, Lord of Windeck (bef. 1247 – 8 March 1290/96) was the son of Adolf VII of Berg and Margaret of Hochstaden. He was the younger brother of Adolf VIII of Berg and William I of Berg.

From 1271 to 1281 Henry served as a governor for his brother Adolf who became Count of Berg in 1259. Henry and his brother Adolf supported John I, Duke of Brabant in his succession war for the Duchy of Limburg, which culminated in the Battle of Worringen in 1288. Henry resided at Windeck castle, probably as an official of his brother. Windeck was one of the four main Berg castles, which had come into the possession of Berg by 1247. Henry is buried with other members of the house of Berg at Altenberg Cathedral.

== Family and children ==
Henry married Agnes of the Mark (German: Agnes von der Mark), daughter of Engelbert I of the Mark and Kunigunde of Blieskastel. They had six children:

1. Adolf
2. Henry (died 24 Apr 1310), Canon at Cologne
3. Margaret, married Otto IV of Ravensberg, mother of Margaret of Ravensberg, heiress of Berg and Ravensberg
4. Kunigunde (1285/86 – aft 1355), Abbess of Gerresheim and Essen
5. Elizabeth, married Walram of Heinsberg
6. Agnes, nun at Gräfrath

== Ancestry ==
16. Henry III, Duke of Limburg (c.1140-1221)
8. Waleran III, Duke of Limburg (c.1165-1226)
17. Sophia of Saarbrücken
4. Henry IV, Duke of Limburg (c.1195-1246/47)
18. Frederick I, Duke of Lorraine (c.1143-1206)
9. Cunigunde of Lorraine (c.1170-1214)
19. Ludmilla of Poland (1150-1223)
2. Adolf VII of Berg (c.1220-1259)
20. Engelbert I, Count of Berg (??-1189)
10. Adolf VI of Berg (bef 1176-1218)
21. Margaret of Guelders
5. Irmgard of Berg (c.1200-1248)
22. Henry II of Sayn (?-aft 1204)
11. Berta of Sayn (?-1244)
23. Agnes of Saffenberg (?-aft 1200)
1. Henry of Berg, Lord of Windeck
24. Otto, Count of Ahr (?-bef 1162)
12. Dietrich of Hochstaden (?-1194/97)
25. Adelheid of Hochstaden
6. Lothar I of Hochstaden (?-1215)
26. Hugo XII of Dagsburg (?-aft 1178)
13. Luitgard of Dagsburg
27. Luitgard of Sulzbach (?-aft 1163)
3. Margaret of Hochstaden (c.1214-1314)
28. Frederick II of Vianden (?-c.1187)
14. Frederick III of Vianden (?-c.1210)
29. Elisabeth of Salm (?-aft 1200)
7. Mathilde of Vianden (?-1241)
15. Mathilda of Neuerburg
