= Adolph I =

Adolph I may refer to:

- Adolf, King of Germany (c. 1255–1298), King of Germany from 1292 until 1298
- Adolph I, Count of Nassau-Wiesbaden-Idstein (1307–1370)
- Adolph I, Duke of Cleves (1373–1448)
- Adolph I, Prince of Anhalt-Köthen (died 1473)
- Adolf I, Count of the Mark (c. 1194–1249)
- Adolf Frederick I, Duke of Mecklenburg (1588–1658)

== See also ==
- Adolf I (disambiguation)
