= Altenberger Dom =

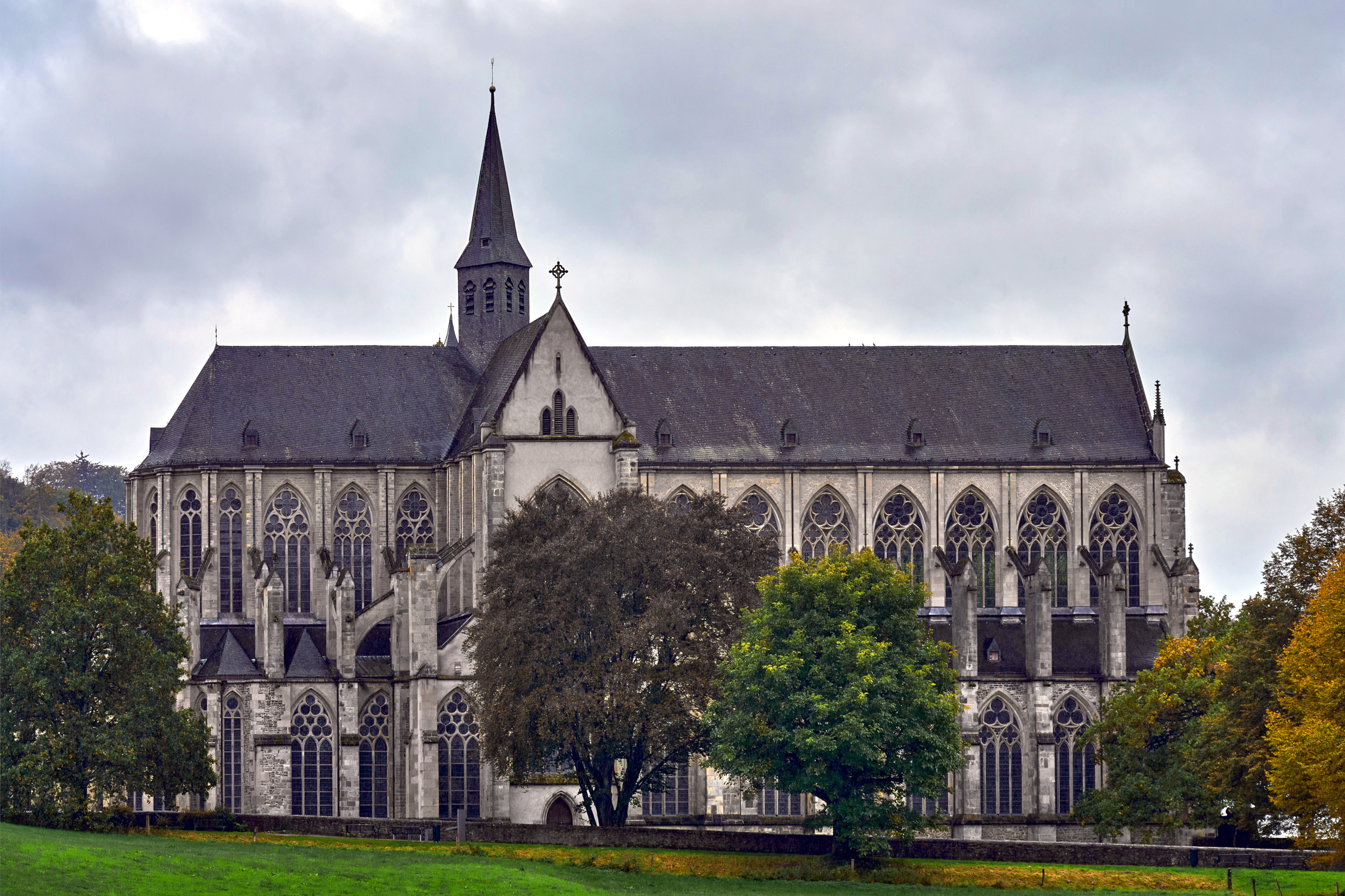

- 51°03′18″N 7°08′00″E
- Location: Altenberg
- Country: Germany
- Denomination: Catholic
- Website: www.altenberger-dom.de

History
- Status: church
- Dedication: Assumption of Mary
- Consecrated: 1276
- Events: restoration 19th century

Architecture
- Style: Gothic

Administration
- Diocese: Diocese of Cologne
- Parish: Katholische Pfarrgemeinde St. Mariä Himmelfahrt am Dom Unserer Lieben Frau zu Altenberg

Altenberger Dom
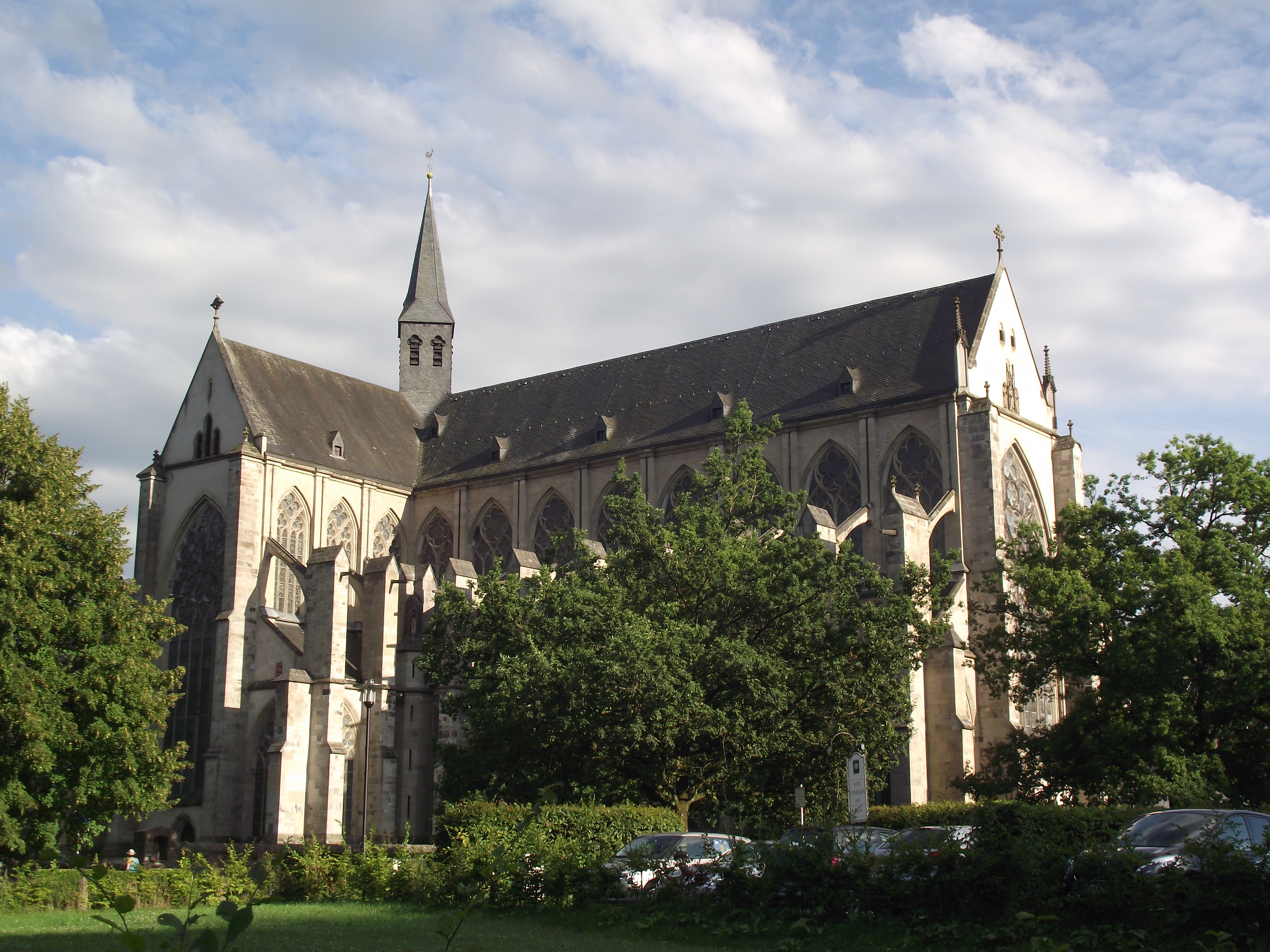
- Altenberger Dom
- Denomination: Evangelical Church in Germany
- Website: www.altenberg-dom.de

Administration
- Parish: Evangelische Kirchengemeinde

The Altenberger Dom (or Bergischer Dom) is the former abbey church of Altenberg Abbey which was built from 1259 in Gothic style by Cistercians. Listed as a cultural heritage, it is located in Altenberg, now part of Odenthal in the Rheinisch-Bergischer Kreis, North Rhine-Westphalia, Germany. Until 1511, the church was the burial site of counts and dukes of Berg and the dukes of Jülich-Berg.

Badly damaged after the monastery was dissolved in 1803 due to the secularisation of Germany, the church was rebuilt with support from Friedrich Wilhelm IV of Prussia, who decreed in 1857 that it was to serve as a parish church simultaneously for a Catholic and a Protestant parish.

The German name has sometimes been translated to English as Altenberg Cathedral, but it was never a cathedral, a bishop's seat.

== History ==
The Counts of Berg settled in the area northeast of Cologne. Their castle was named Berg, in Latin "Mons", later "veterus Mons" in German "Alter Berg" or "Altenberg", situated above the river Dhünn. The castle's name was transferred to the county and the counts, and today the area is called the Bergisches Land. In 1133 the senior line of the counts resettled in Burg Castle, latin "Novus Mons" and transferred the castle at Altenberg to the Cistercians who arrived from Morimond. They founded Altenberg Abbey on the river, and its first church was consecrated in 1160. In 1259 the archbishop of Cologne, Konrad von Hochstaden, laid the foundations of a larger church called "St. Mariä Himmelfahrt" (Assumption of Mary). The choir of the new church, in Gothic style, was consecrated in 1276. The choir's floor plan is similar to that of the Cologne Cathedral, and the choir is similar to the destroyed choir of Royaumont, probably because the builders of Altenburg were familiar with that site. The church was built over 140 years and served as the abbey church for centuries.

The monastery was dissolved in 1803 during the secularisation of Germany. The buildings were used for a chemical plant, and in 1815 a fire destroyed most of thems. Count Fürstenberg von Stammheim bought the ruins in 1833 and turned them over to the Prussian king, Friedrich Wilhelm IV, who was fond of medieval history.

The king supported the rebuilding of the Altenberger Dom, and also the completion of Cologne Cathedral. He suggested in the 1830s that the Altenberger Dom should be used by both Catholics and Protestants as a simultaneum, and finalized the idea in a royal decree of 1856.

== Windows ==
The windows are predominantly in shades of grey (Grisaille), with some coloured windows, especially the large window in the west facade.

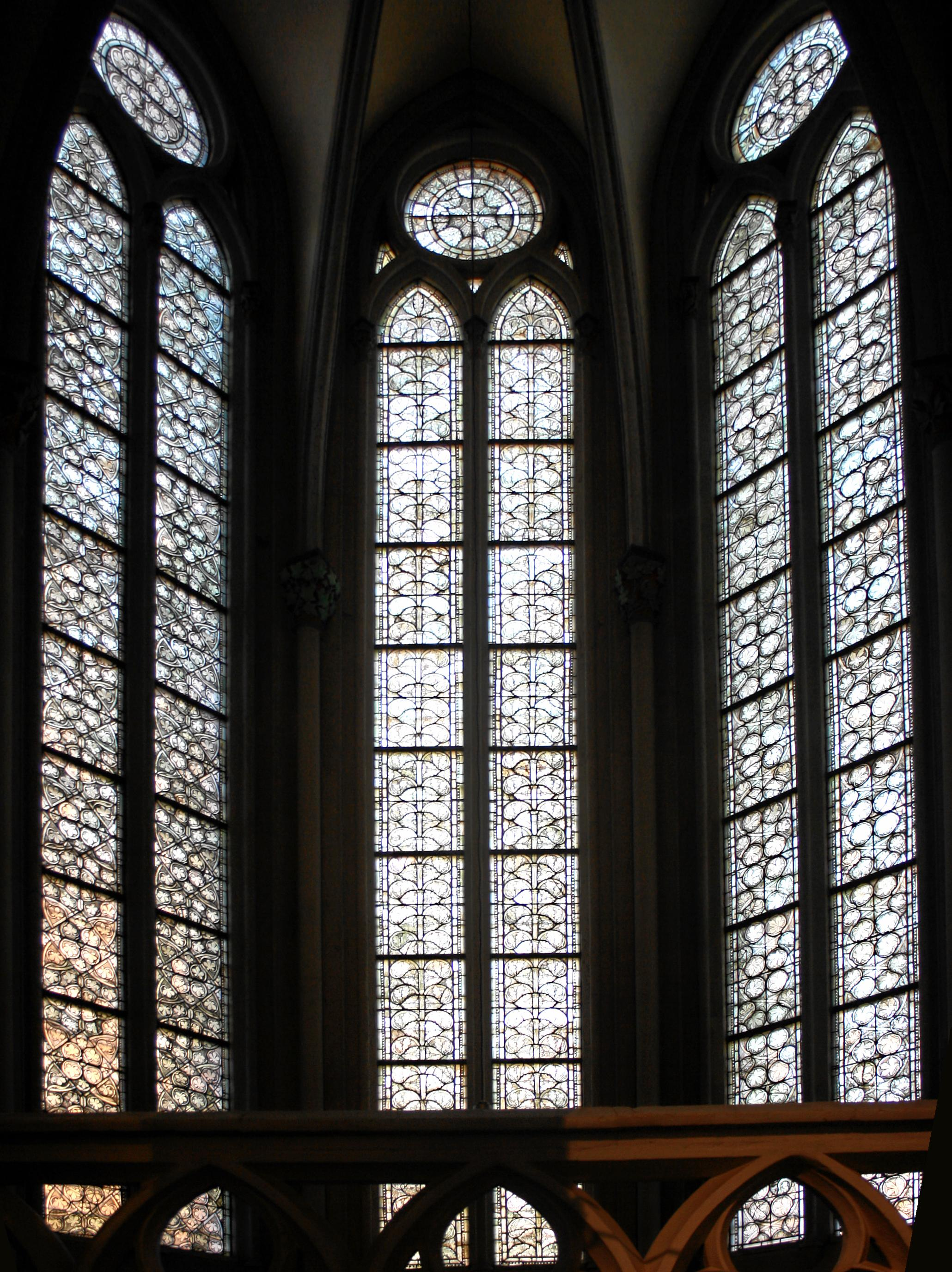
Approx. 1270: Grisaille, choir

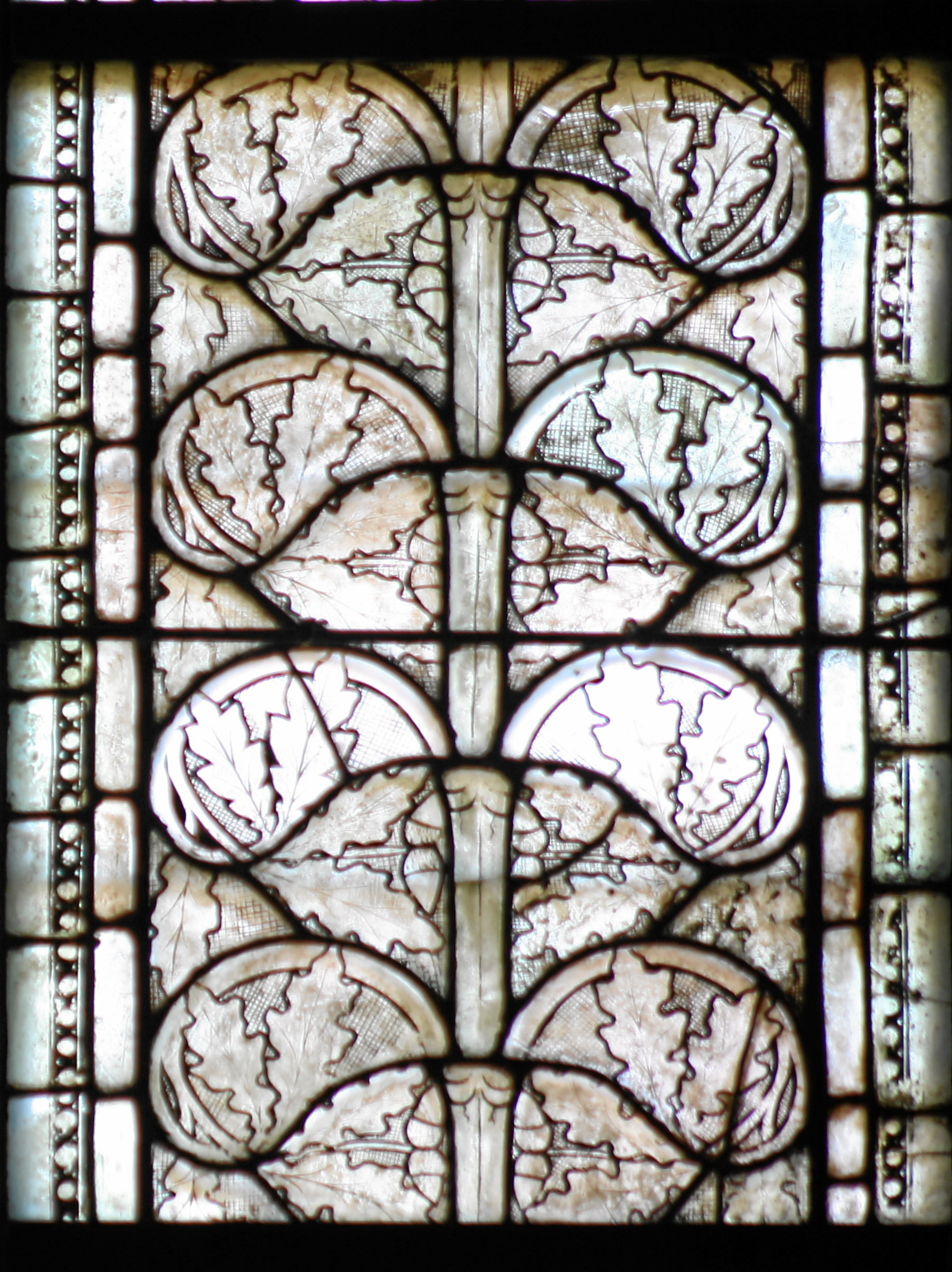
Detail

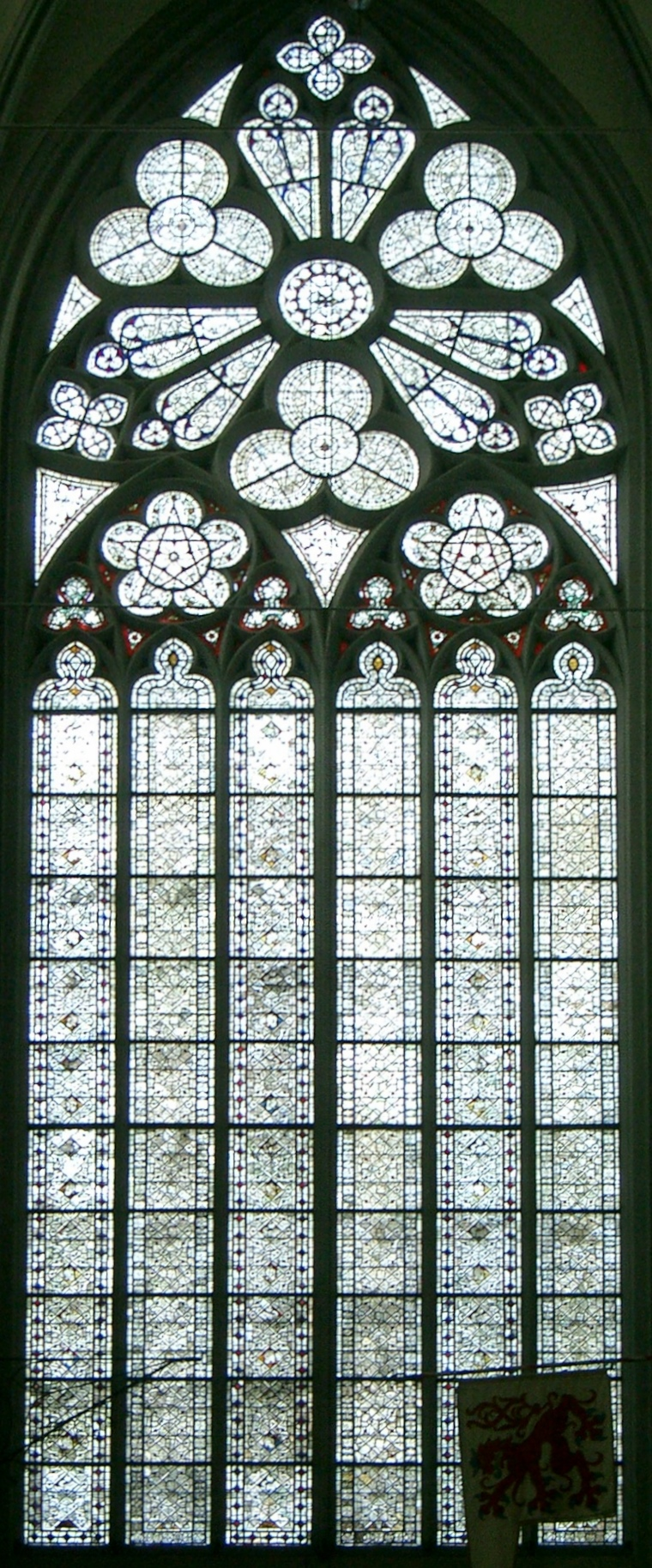
Before 1300: Grisaille, north transept

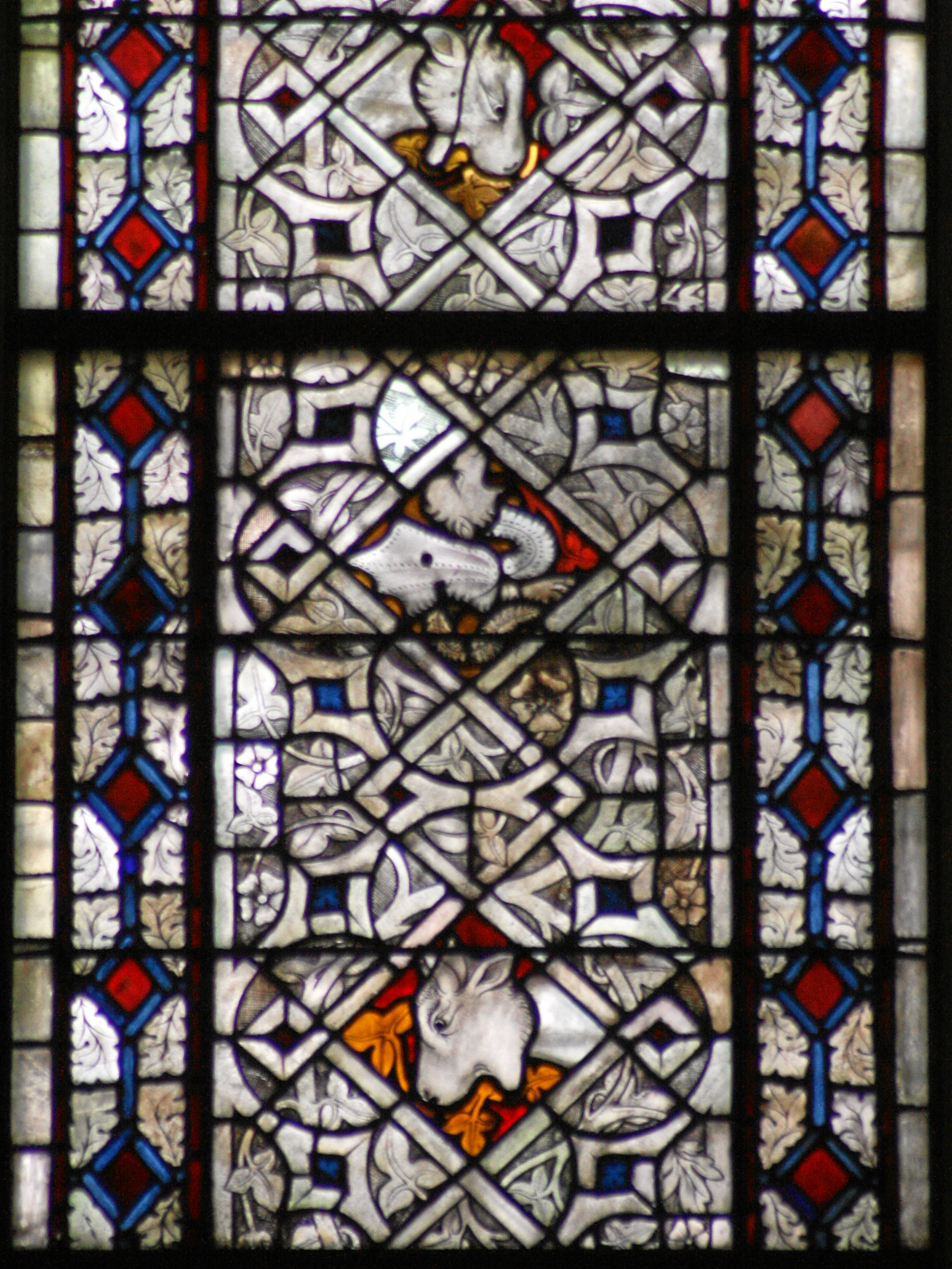
Detail

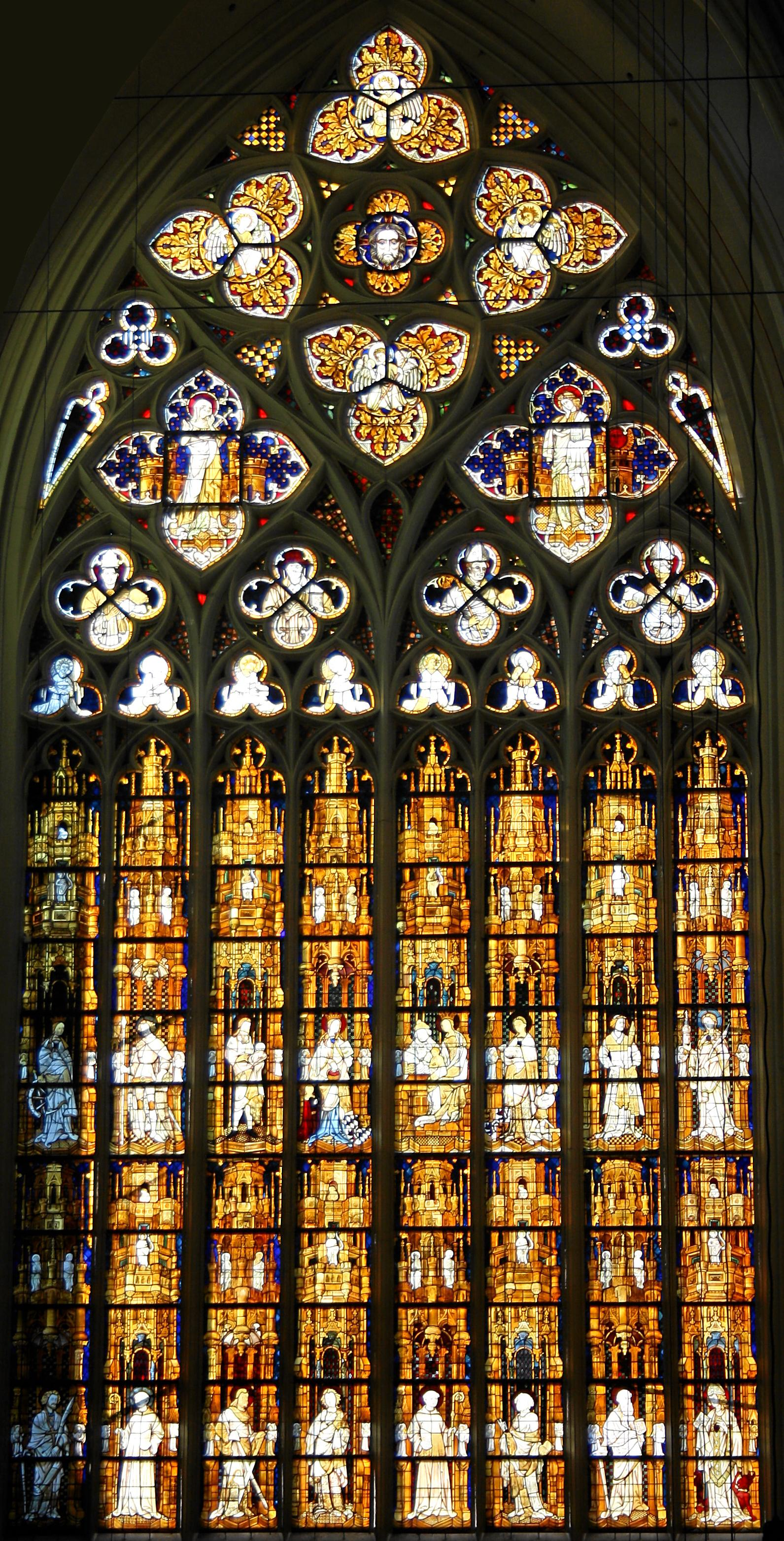
Approx. 1400: Coloured, west façade

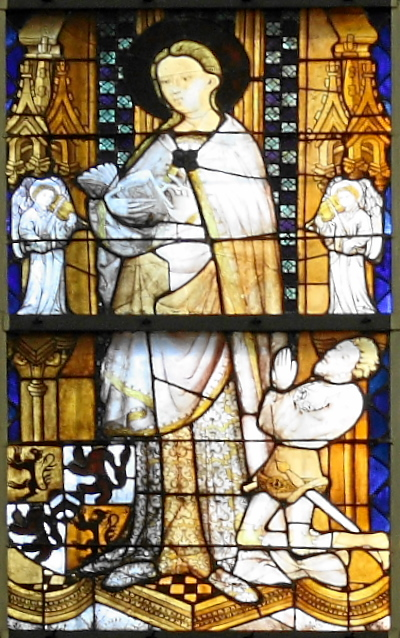
Detail

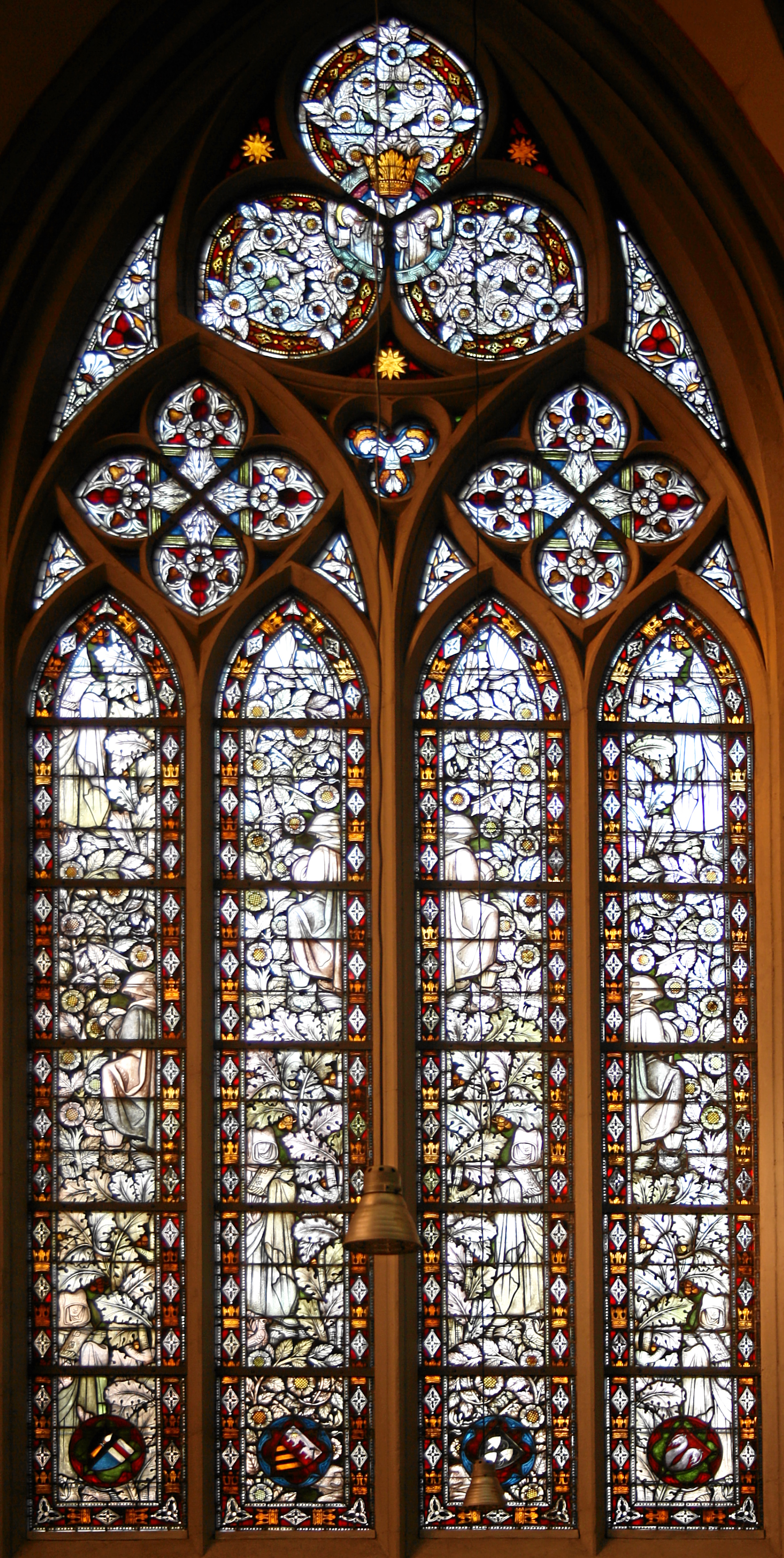
19. century: nave

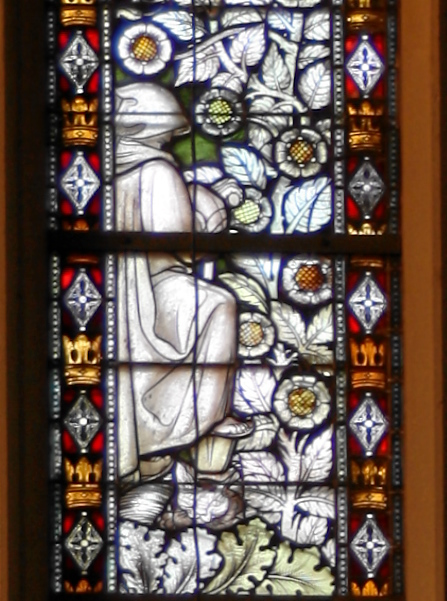
Detail

== Church music ==
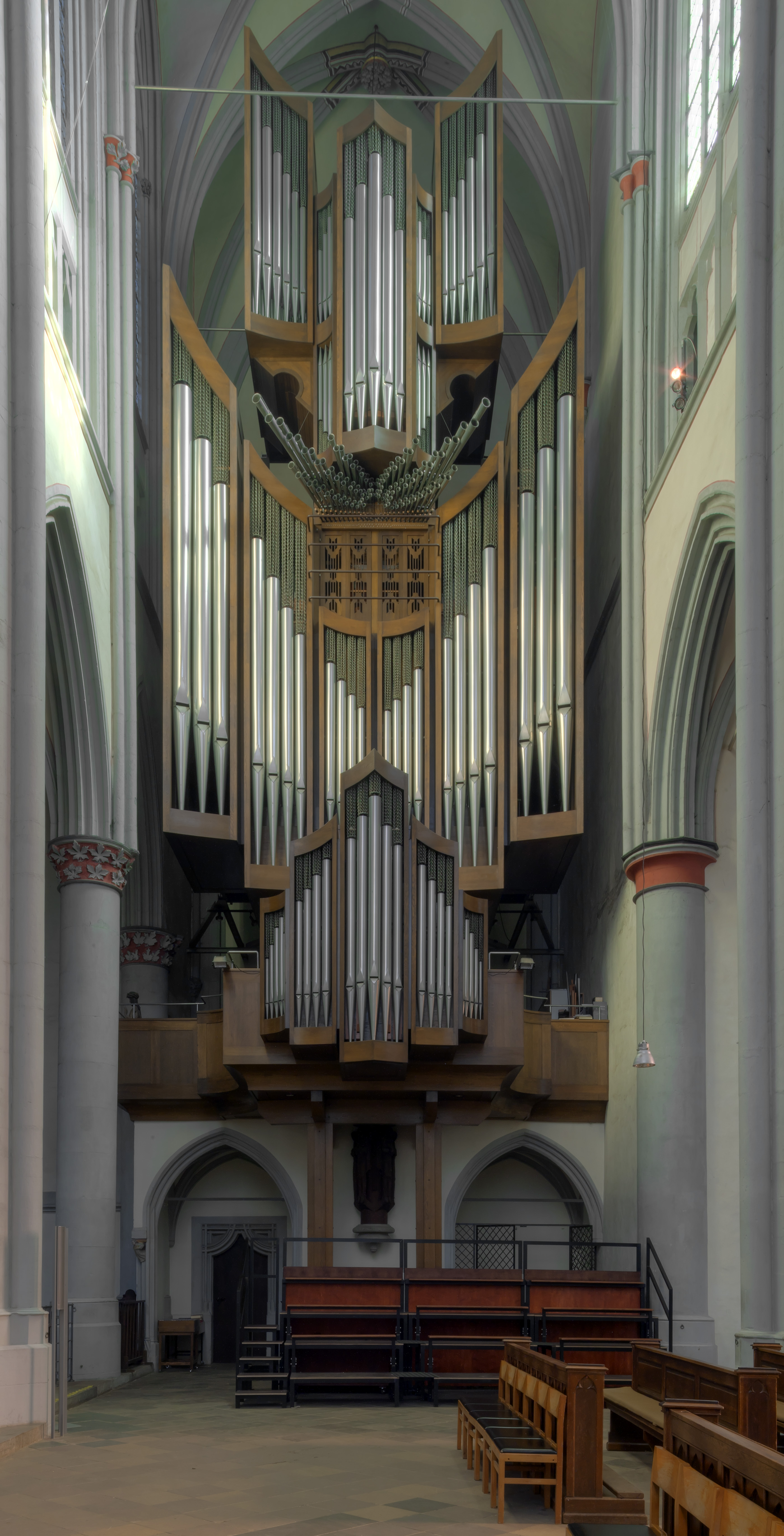
The Klais organ

The church serves also as a concert venue. From May to October, sacred music and vespers take place regularly at 11:45 a.m.

The organ was built in 1980 by Klais Orgelbau, Bonn, an instrument of 6300 pipes, 88 stops, four manuals and pedal, with the last pedal stops added from 2007. The organ has been used for concerts and recordings.

== Graves of nobility ==
According to a Benedictine tradition, members of the noble family owning the abbey were buried in the church.

- Count Everhard von Berg (died between 1145 and 1152)
- Adolf IV, Count of Berg, founder of the abbey
- Count Adolf VII of Berg (died 1259)
- Count William I of Berg (died 1308)
- Provost Konrad I of Berg (died 1313)
- Count Gerhard VI of Jülich, Count of Berg and Ravensberg (died 1360) and his wife, Margaret of Ravensberg (1320–1389)
- Duke William VII of Jülich, 1st Duke of Berg (died 25 June 1408)
- Duke Adolf, Duke of Jülich-Berg (died in Cologne 1437)
- Duke Gerhard VII, Duke of Jülich-Berg (died 1475)
- Duke William IV, Duke of Jülich-Berg (died 1511) and his wife Sibylle of Brandenburg
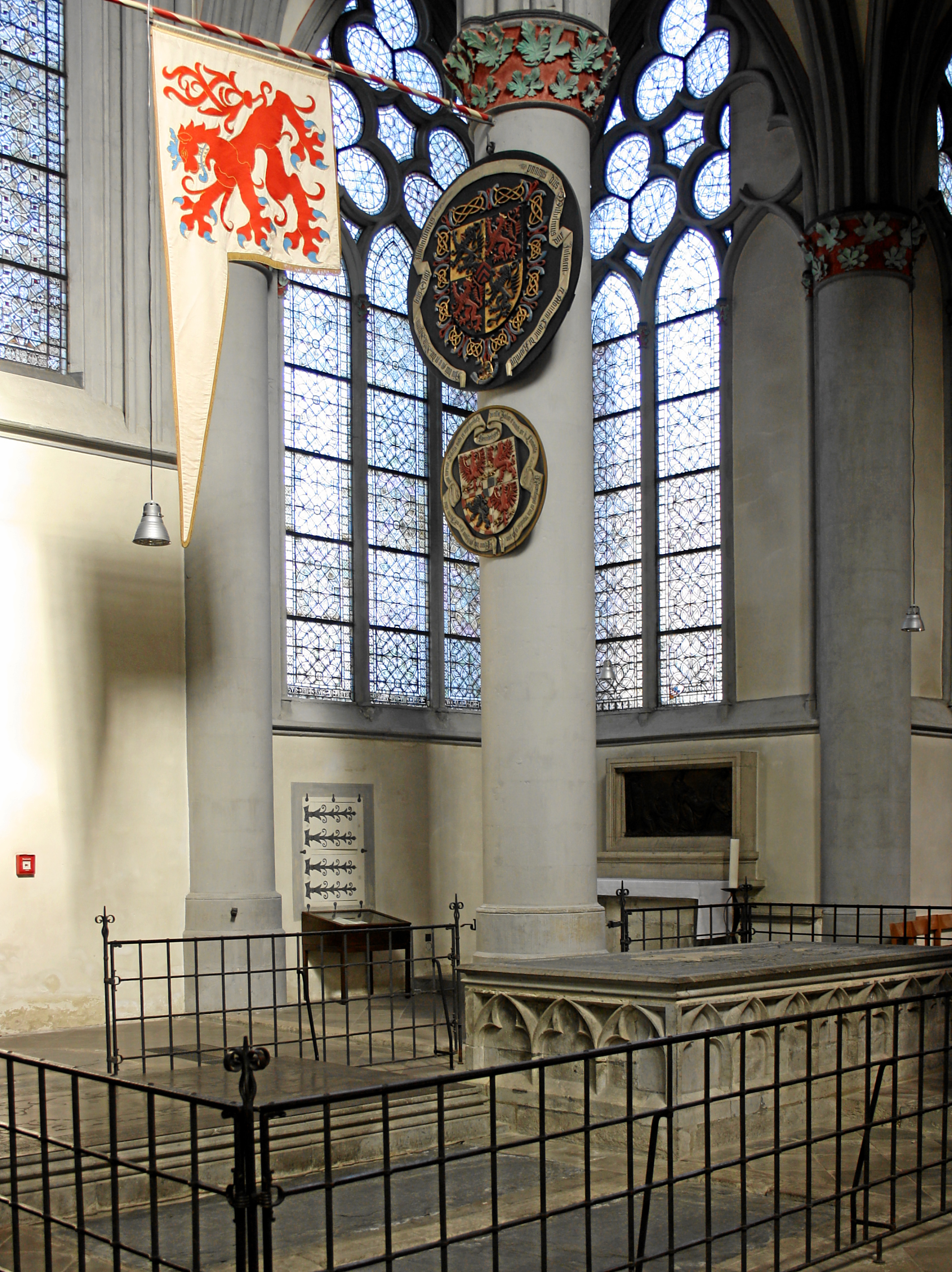
Graves of the house Berg

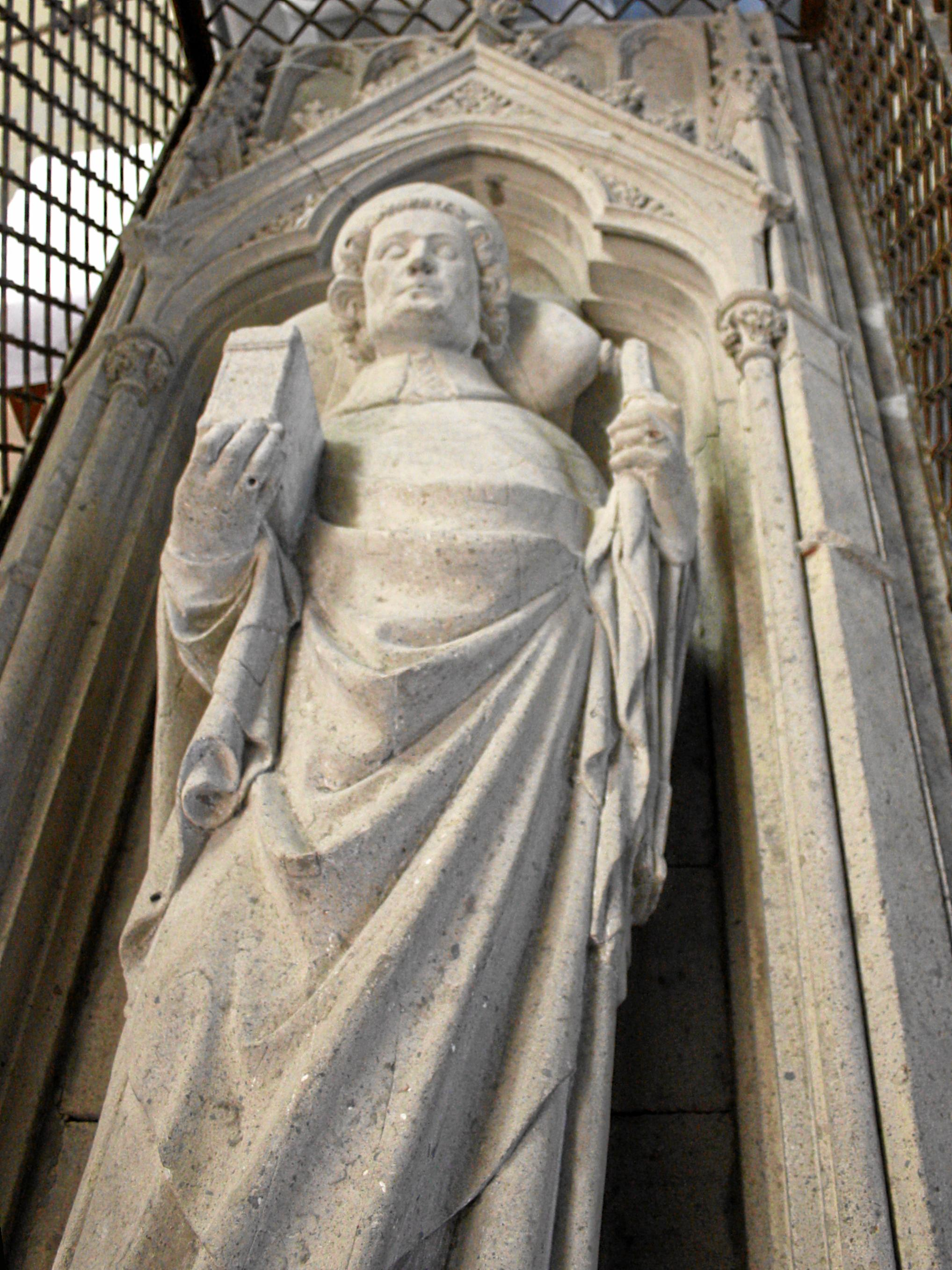
Archbishop Bruno III of Berg

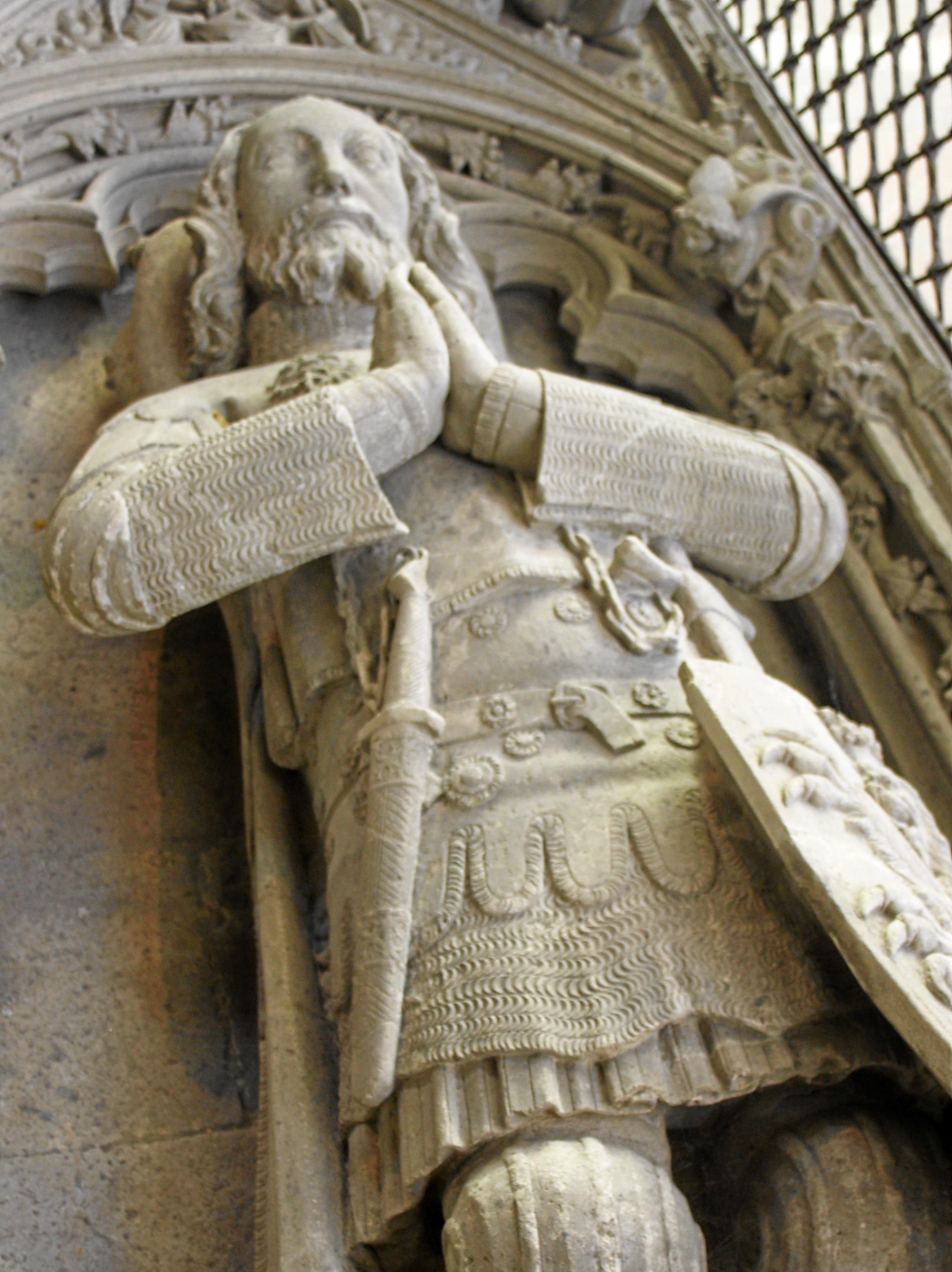
Count Adolf IX of Berg

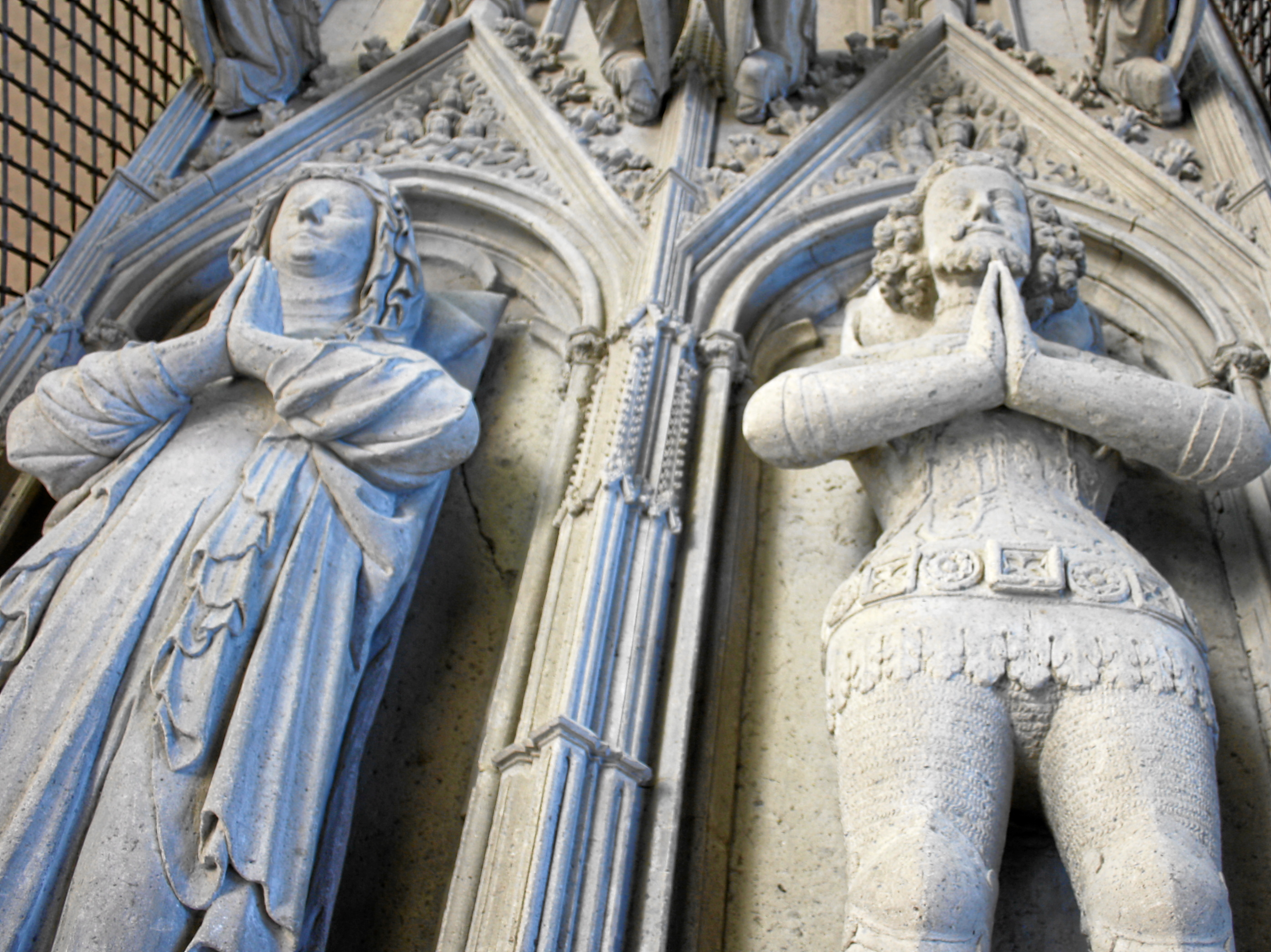
Margaret of Ravensberg and Gerhard VI of Ravensberg

== Literature ==
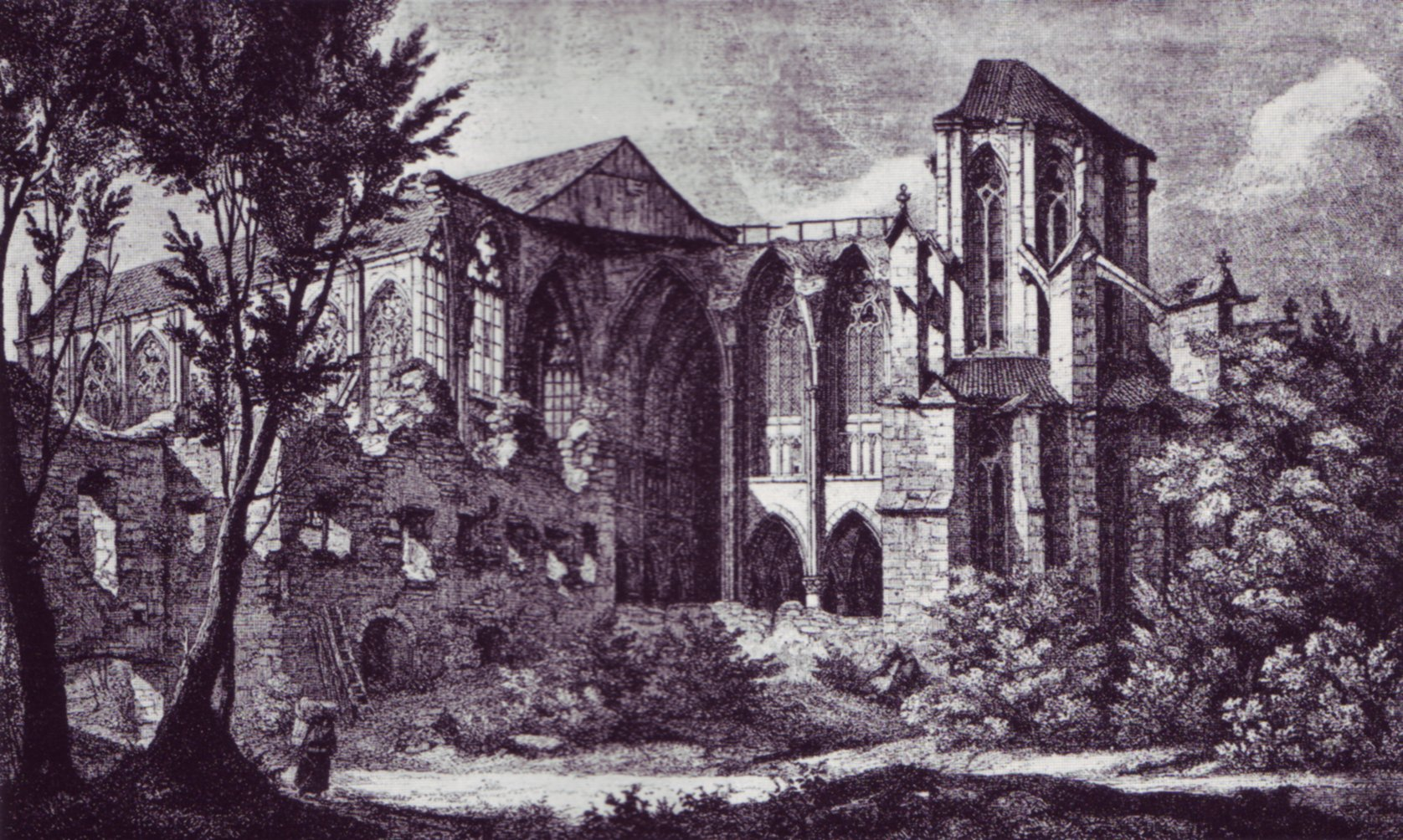
Ruins of Altenberger Dom, 1834, etching by E. Gerhardt

- Martin Banniza: Geschichte und Architektur – Der Altenberger Dom. In: Bergische Blätter. 21, 1998, 3
- David Bosbach: Altenberg. Der Dom und das Tal der Dhünn. Gaasterland-Verlag, Düsseldorf 2005, ISBN 3-935873-04-2.
- Nicolaus J. Breidenbach: Die Güter und Beziehungen der Abtei Altenberg zu Wermelskirchen. In: Altenberger Hefte. Nr. 35, Odenthal 2006.
- Karl Eckert: 700 Jahre Altenberg im künstlerischen Bildwerk vom 13. bis zum 20. Jahrhundert. Beiträge zu Bau- und Kunstdenkmälern im Rheinland 4. Johann Heider, Bergisch Gladbach 1956.
- Festschrift 75 Jahre Altenberger Dom-Verein 1894–1969. Bergisch Gladbach 1969.
- Ursula Francke: Archäologische Untersuchungen im Altenberger Dom. In: Ökumenerat der evangelischen und katholischen Kirchengemeinden Altenberg (ed.): Altenberg 1847 . 1857 . 1997. Festschrift 150 Jahre Wiederherstellung, 140 Jahre Simultangebrach des Altenberger Domes. Odenthal 1997.
- Uwe Gast, Daniel Parello, Hartmut Scholz: Der Altenberger Dom. (= Monumente der Glasmalerei 2). Schnell & Steiner, Regensburg 2008, ISBN 978-3-7954-1960-8.
- Susanne Heydasch-Lehmann, Andreas Stürmer, Klaus Faika: Altenberg. Der Bergische Dom. Kunstverlag Josef Fink, Lindenberg i. Allgäu 2008, ISBN 978-3-89870-297-3.
- Hansjörg Laute: Die Herren von Berg – Auf den Spuren der Geschichte des Bergischen Landes (1101–1806). Boll, Solingen 1988, ISBN 3-9801918-0-X (Quelle für die im Dom begrabenen Grafen und Herzöge).

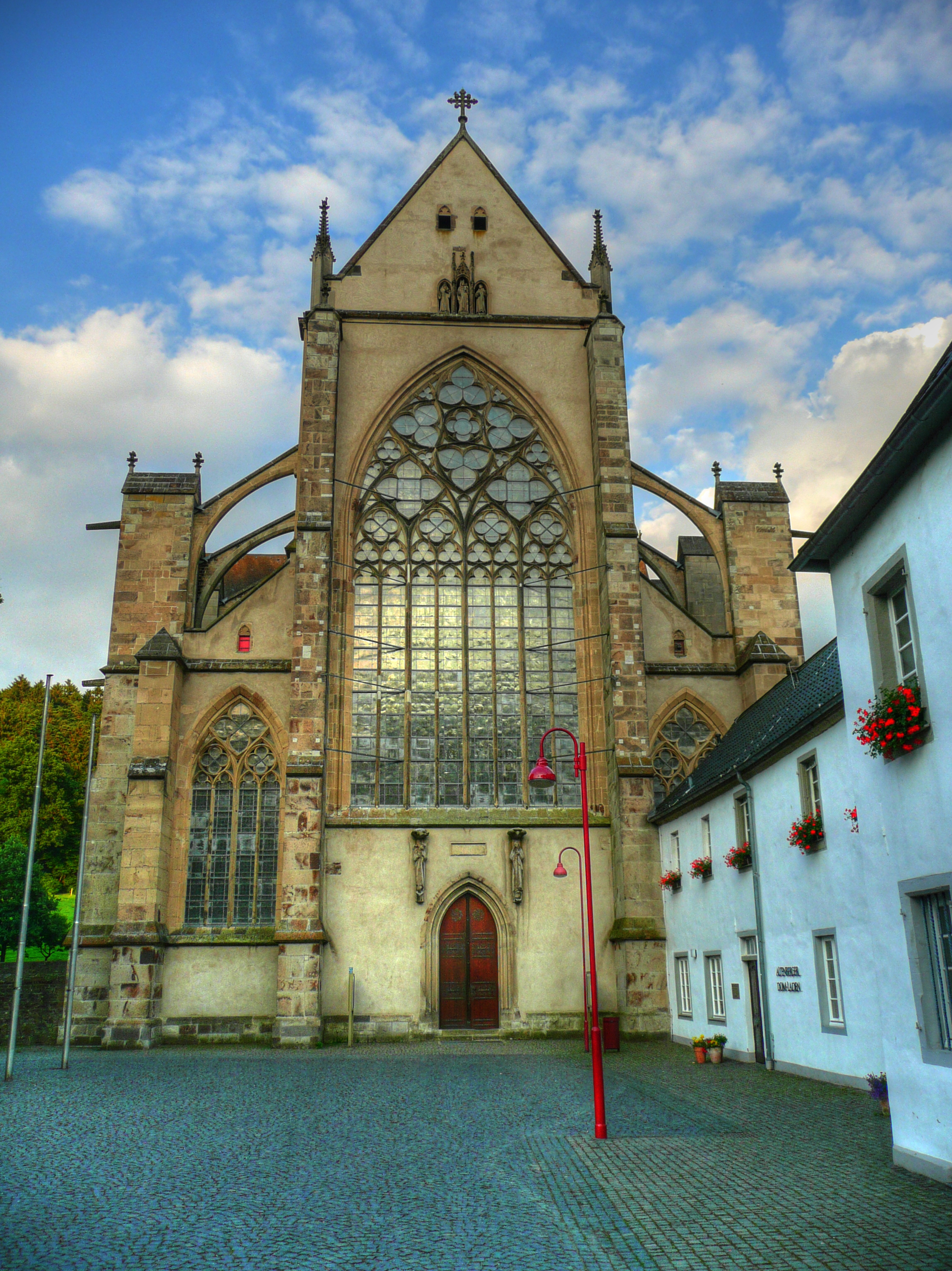
West facade

- Sabine Lepsky, Norbert Nußbaum: Die Westfassade der Zisterzienserkirche Altenberg. Beobachtungen zur gotischen Bautechnik. (= Veröffentlichungen des Altenberger Dom-Vereins 5). Altenberger Dom-Verein e.V., Bergisch Gladbach 1999.
- Sabine Lepsky, Norbert Nußbaum: Gotische Konstruktion und Baupraxis an der Zisterzienserkirche Altenberg 1: Die Choranlage. (= Veröffentlichungen des Altenberger Dom-Vereins 9). Altenberger Dom-Verein e.V., Bergisch Gladbach 2005, ISBN 978-3-935921-04-6.
- Sabine Lepsky, Norbert Nußbaum: Gotische Konstruktion und Bautechnik an der Zisterzienserkirche Altenberg 2: Quer- und Langhaus. (Veröffentlichungen des Altenberger Dom-Vereins 11). Heider-Verlag, Bergisch Gladbach 2012, ISBN 978-3-87314-475-0.
- Brigitte Lymant: Die mittelalterlichen Glasmalereien der ehemaligen Zisterzienserkirche Altenberg. Herausgeber: Altenberger Dom-Verein, Bergisch Gladbach 1979.
- Heike Ritter-Eden: Der Altenberger Dom zwischen romantischer Bewegung und moderner Denkmalpflege. Die Restaurierung von 1815 bis 1915 (= Veröffentlichungen des Altenberger Dom-Vereins 7). Altenberger Dom-Verein, Bergisch Gladbach 2002, ISBN 3-935921-01-2 (Dissertation Universität Köln 2001, 282 p).
- Ulrike Wirtler: Das ehemalige romanische Zisterzienserkloster Altenberg. (= Rheinische Ausgrabungen 75). Rheinisches Landesmuseum Köln 1976, pp 84–86.
- Vincenz von Zuccalmaglio: Altenberg im Dhünthale und der Bergische Dom: mit Ansicht, Grundriß und Beschreibung und einer Orientierungskarte für Touristen. Düsseldorf 1884 (ub.uni-duesseldorf.de).
