= Adolf I =

Adolf I may refer to:

- Adolf I of Lotharingia (died 1018), Vogt of Deutz
- Adolf I of Berg (died 1086)
- Adolf I of Holstein (died 1130), Count of Schauenburg
- Adolf I, Archbishop of Cologne or Adolf of Altena or Adolf of Berg (c. 1157–1220)
- Adolf I, Count of the Mark (1194–1249)
- Adolf I, Prince of Schaumburg-Lippe (1817–1893)
- Adolf I of Luxembourg (1817–1905)
- Adolf Frederick I, Duke of Mecklenburg (1588–1658)

== See also ==
- Adolph I (disambiguation)
