= Adolf VIII =

Adolf VIII may refer to:

- Adolf VIII of Berg (c. 1240–1296)
- Adolphus VIII, Count of Holstein (1401–1459)
