= Battle of Worringen =

Part of the War of the Limburg Succession

Coordinates: 51°02′33″N 6°53′16″E

- Part of the War of the Limburg Succession
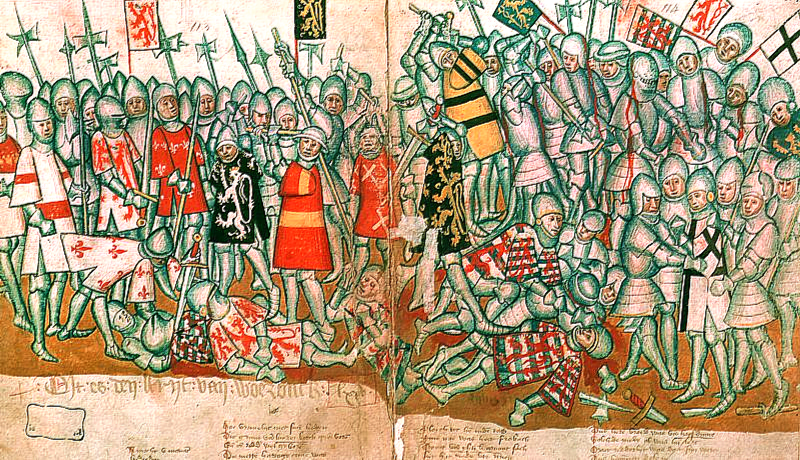
- Illustration from a mid 15th century ms. of Brabantsche Yeesten
Date	5 June 1288
Location	Worringen, today part of Cologne
Result	Brabantian victory
Territorial changes	Limburg added to Brabant; Cologne de facto independent from Electorate

Belligerents
Electorate of Cologne; County of Guelders; County of Luxemburg; Lordship of Ligny; County of Nassau; House of Plettenberg; County of Hülchrath; Lordship of Tomburg	Duchy of Brabant; City of Cologne; County of Berg; County of Mark; County of Loon; County of Jülich; County of Tecklenburg; County of Waldeck; County of Ziegenhain; County of Vianden

Commanders and leaders
Siegfried II of Westerburg; Reginald I of Guelders; Henry VI of Luxembourg †; Waleran I of Ligny †; Adolf of Nassau; Dietrich Luf II	John I of Brabant; Adolf VIII of Berg; Eberhard II of Mark; Arnold V Walram of Jülich; Otto III of Tecklenburg; Otto I of Waldeck; Gottfried VI of Ziegenhain; Geoffrey I of Vianden

Strength
4,200: 2,800 armored cavalry; 1,400 footmen	4,800: 2,300 armored cavalry; 2,500 footmen

Casualties and losses
c. 1,100^{a}	c. 40
- a: A substantial number of the adult male members of the House of Luxembourg were killed in this battle.

The Battle of Worringen was fought on 5 June 1288 near the town of Worringen (also spelled Woeringen), which is now part of Chorweiler, the northernmost borough (Stadtbezirk) of Cologne. It was the decisive battle of the War of the Limburg Succession, fought for the possession of the Duchy of Limburg between on one side the Archbishop Siegfried II of Cologne and Count Henry VI of Luxembourg, and on the other side, Duke John I of Brabant.

== Prelude ==
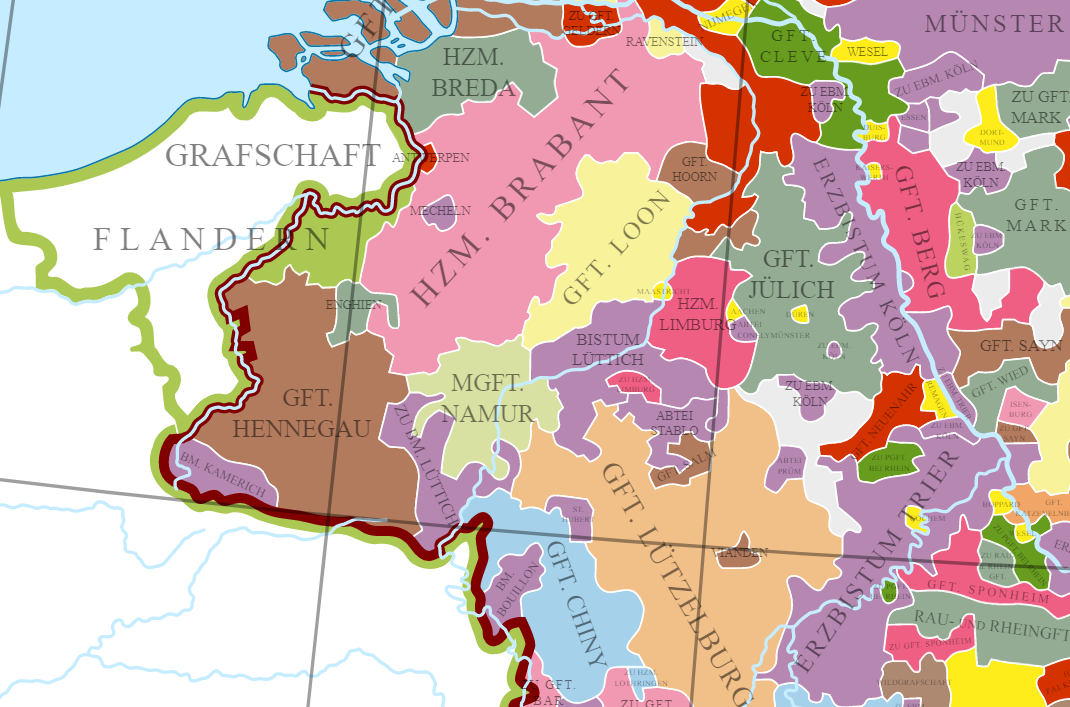
Lower Lorraine territories about 1250, Brabant and Limburg in pink

The conflict arose after Duke Waleran IV of Limburg, a scion of the Lotharingian Ardennes-Verdun dynasty, had died without male heirs in 1279. His duchy was inherited by his daughter Ermengarde, who had married Count Reginald I of Guelders about 1270. Ermengarde's husband claimed the Limburg heritage and in 1282 had his ducal title recognized by the German king Rudolf I.

The marriage of Reginald and Ermengarde, however, remained childless and when she died in 1283, Count Adolf VIII of Berg, Duke Waleran's nephew as son of his elder brother Count Adolf VII, also claimed the Limburg duchy. As far as the succession in the female line was denied, Reginald was unable to assert his claims. An agreement seemed possible; nevertheless, Adolf of Berg preceded his Ardennes relatives when in September 1283 he sold his claims to the mighty Reginar duke John of Brabant.

John intended to enlarge his Brabant territory and re-unite the former Duchy of Lower Lorraine in the northwest of the Holy Roman Empire. Limburg was also economically important as it stretched along the major Via Regia trade route to Aachen and Cologne on the Rhine river. Though John held the title of Duke of Lothier since 1190, it had been solely honorific and did not imply any inheritance claims. The Limburg nobles therefore refused to accept John's overlordship, when his forces invaded the duchy.

Between 1283 and 1288, the conflict was delayed by several smaller confrontations between both sides, none of them decisive. Meanwhile, most of the other local powers chose sides. Siegfried II of Westerburg, the Archbishop of Cologne, suspiciously eyed John's increasing power in the Lower Lorraine lands. In view of their common interests, he and Reginald of Guelders forged an alliance in August 1284, joined by Count Henry VI of Luxembourg, and his brother Waleran I of Ligny, as well as by Count Adolf of Nassau. On the other side the Westphalian counts of Mark took the chance to affirm their independence from the Archbishop of Cologne and together with the Counts of Loon, Tecklenburg and Waldeck allied with Brabant and Berg.

== Battle ==
Positions of forces at the beginning of the battle.

In May 1288, Henry of Luxembourg had led a significant army into the Cologne region. Numerous vassals and allies joined his forces and Reginald of Guelders finally sold his rights to Limburg to him, just before peace talks were scheduled. This angered John of Brabant, who in turn started a campaign against Reginald. In Brühl, he met with the Mark and Berg troops by the end of the month. Together they marched against Worringen, a castle on the Rhine held by the Archbishop of Cologne. John laid siege to the fortress, supported by the Cologne citizens, who were eager to free themselves from the archbishop's rule.

Siegfried, witnessing the estrangement of his subjects, likewise started marching. He and Henry of Luxembourg gathered their troops at Neuss and moved to Brauweiler Abbey. On the early morning of 5 June 1288 they departed for Worringen at the head of their troops.

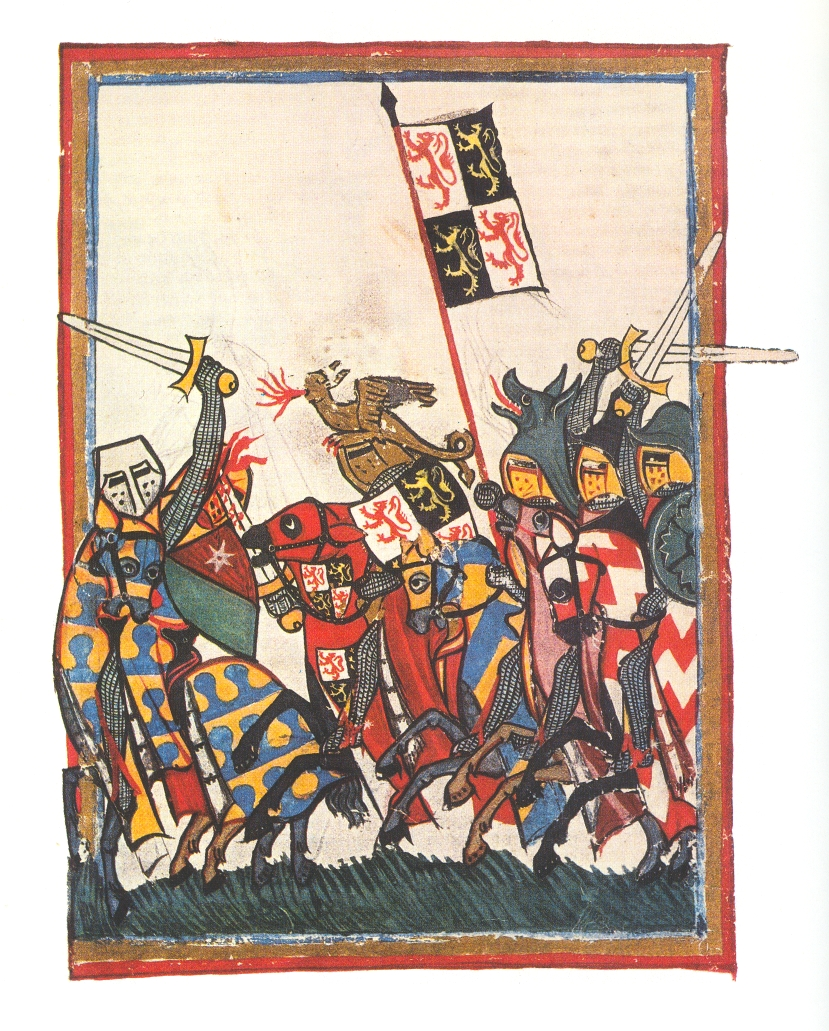
John I, Duke of Brabant, at the Battle of Worringen, Codex Manesse, about 1340

In the earliest phases of the battle, John of Brabant and Henry of Luxembourg met in a fierce fight, in which Henry and two of his brothers were killed. Soon after that, Siegfried entered the battle and in a bold advance was able to repel the Berg troops and the Cologne militia, however with too little support from his reserves.

In mid-afternoon, the Berg and Mark troops, along with the Cologne citizens, had gathered again and started a savage attack on the archbishop's forces. The battle ended in a victory for Brabant when Reginald of Guelders was captured by Daniel van Bouchout and Lord Walram of Valkenburg had to retreat. Archbishop Siegfried was taken prisoner by John of Brabant and delivered to Adolf of Berg.

== Aftermath ==
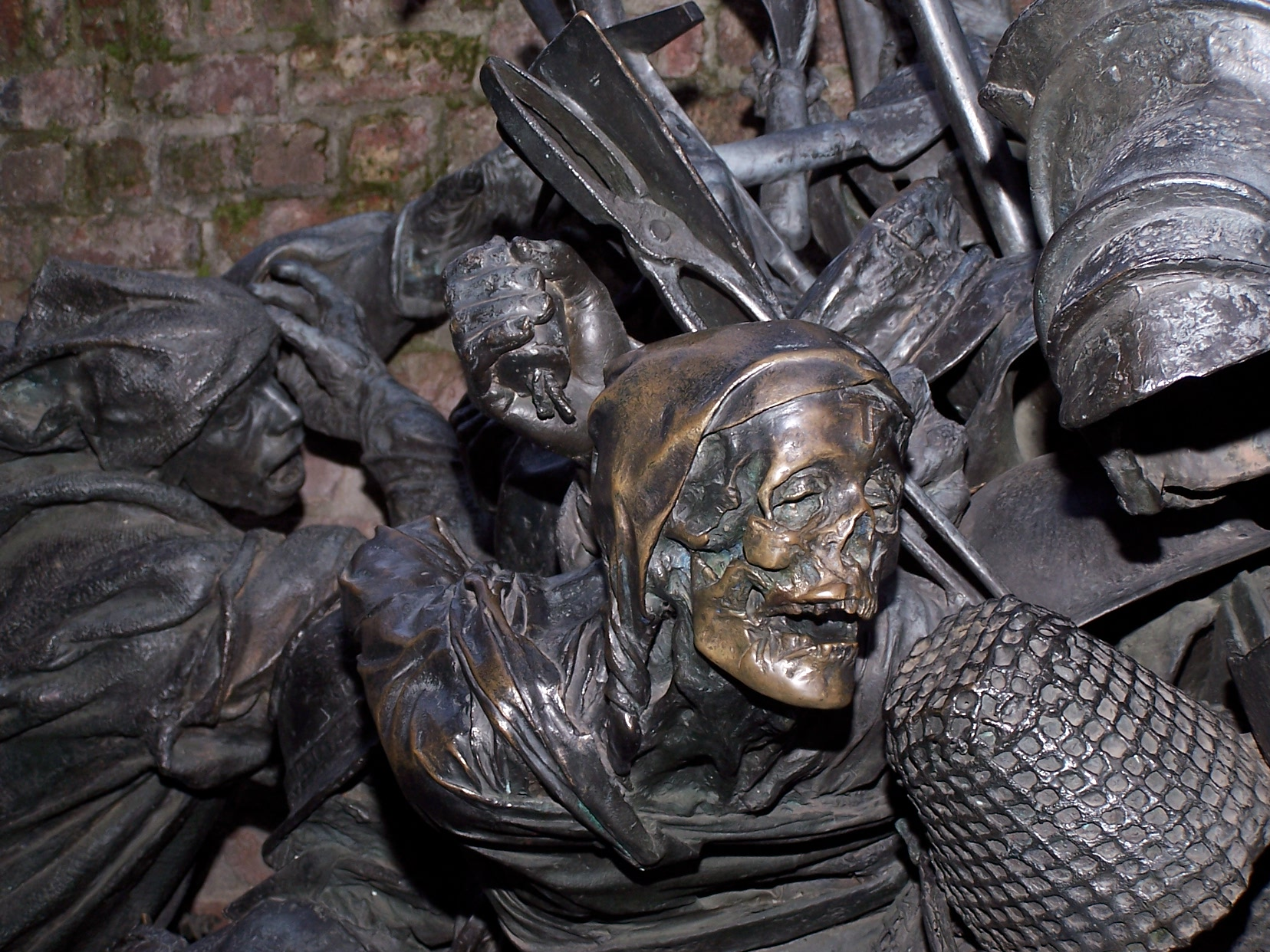
Detail from memorial at Düsseldorf, bronze, 1988

The number of deaths at the Battle of Worringen is estimated at 1100 on the Guelders side and 40 on the Brabant side. The casualties among the house of Luxembourg was particularly high: most of the male relatives of the later German emperor Henry VII perished there. Archbishop Siegfried was imprisoned for over a year at Schloss Burg, before he paid a ransom and agreed to Count Adolf's demands. Worringen Castle and several other fortresses of the bishop were demolished. On 14 August 1288 Adolf granted city rights to Düsseldorf, which became the capital of Berg. Reginald of Guelders was released after he had renounced all claims to the Duchy of Limburg.

The Battle of Worringen meant a rise in the power of Brabant, Berg and Mark, while the City of Cologne gained its independence from the Archbishopric and finally the status of a free imperial city in 1475. The Duchy of Limburg was added to the Duchy of Brabant in 1289, an arrangement approved by King Rudolph and again by his former opponent Adolf of Nassau, after he was elected King of the Romans in 1292. In Luxembourg, Henry VI was succeeded by his nine-year-old son Henry VII, who in 1292 settled the conflict with Brabant by marrying John's daughter Margaret. The Archbishopric of Cologne never recovered from the loss of the city of Cologne.

Jan van Heelu wrote a chronicle of the battle.
