= William I of Berg =

Count of Berg

William I of Berg (c. 1242 – 16 April 1308) was the son of Count Adolf VII of Berg and of Margaret of Hochstaden.

Upon the death of his brother, Count Adolf VIII of Berg, William succeeded as Count of Berg. Formerly serving as a monk, he was absolved of his religious vows by the pope in order to take the position. His tenure was notable due to increased and constant conflict with the Archbishop of Cologne. In 1300 he supported King Albert I of Germany against the Rhenish electors which further strengthened his position against the archbishop. During his life he started foundations for monasteries and churches, including those in Beyenburg (now part of Wuppertal) and Gräfrath. He was also served as the benefactor of the citizens of Hückeswagen.

William married Irmgard of Cleves (?–11 May 1319), widow of Conrad I of Saffenburg and daughter of Dietrich VI, Count of Cleves. William and Irmgard are buried in the Berg family vault of the Altenberg Cathedral. As William had no children, his nephew Adolf IX of Berg, son of his brother Henry of Berg, Lord of Windeck succeeded him as Count of Berg.

Preceded by Adolf VIII	Count of Berg; 1296–1308	Succeeded by Adolf IX
