= Otto II of Guelders =

German aristocrat

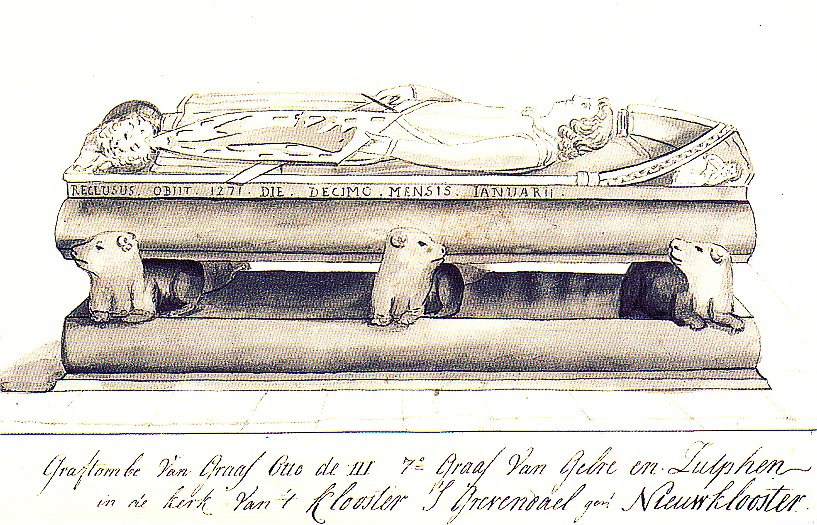
Drawing of the tomb for Otto II of Guelders

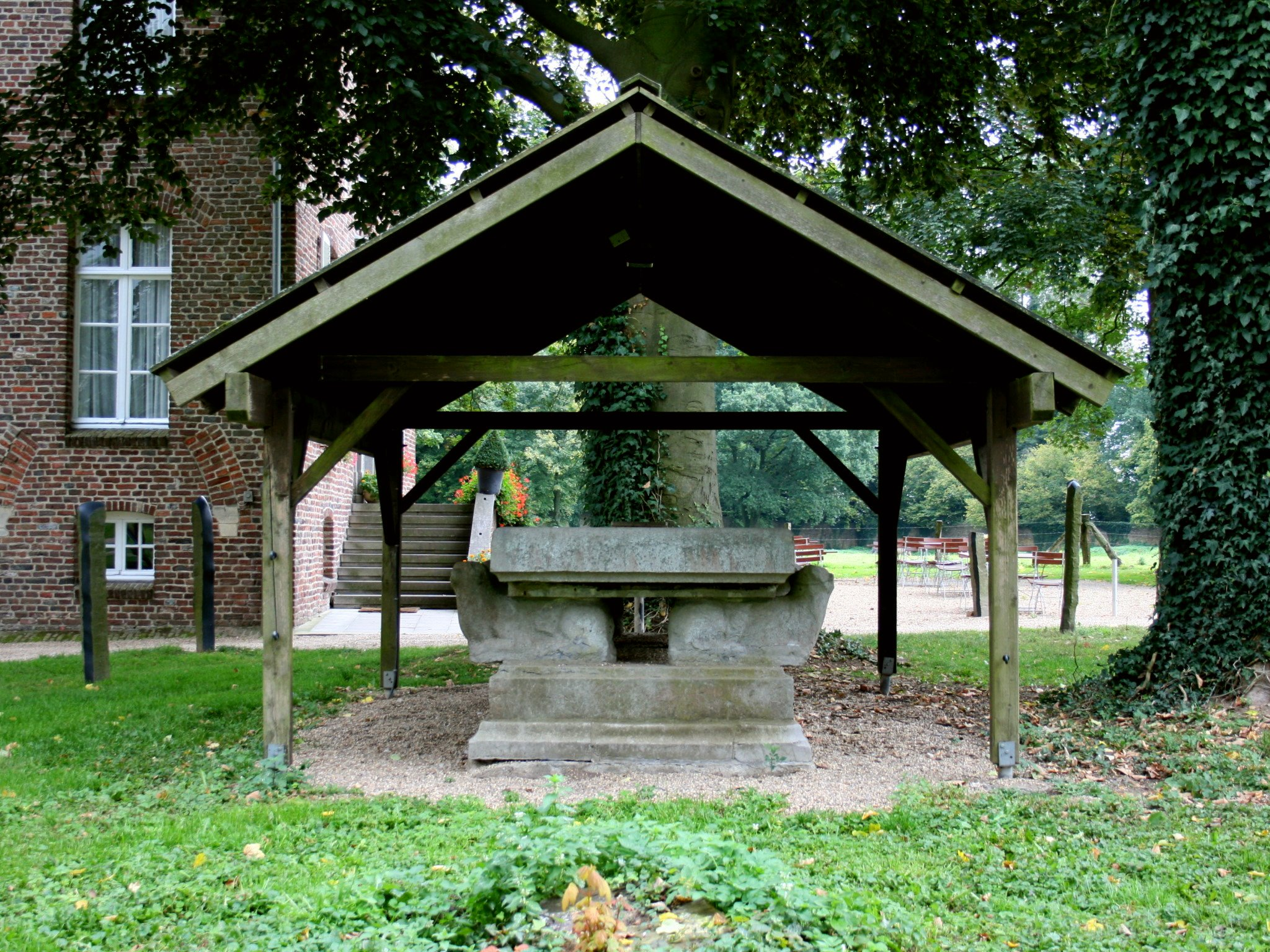
Tomb of Otto II of Guelders at former Graefenthal Abbey

Otto II, Count of Guelders (c. 1215 – 1 January 1271) was a nobleman from the 13th century. He was the son of Gerard III, Count of Guelders and Margaretha of Brabant.

== Life ==
After Count William II (1227–1256) was slain in 1256 by Frisians his two-year-old son Floris V, Count of Holland inherited Holland. His uncle (Floris de Voogd regent from 1256 to 1258), and later his aunt (Adelaide of Holland regent from 1258 to 1263) fought over custody of Holland with other nobles. At the battle of Reimerswaal on 22 January 1263, Count Otto II defeated Aleidis and was chosen regent by the nobles who opposed Aleidis.

Otto fought in the Stedinger Crusade in 1234.

Otto II served as Floris V's guardian until he was twelve years old (1266) and considered capable of administering Holland himself.

== Family ==
Otto II, Count of Guelders was the son of Gerard III, Count of Guelders and Margaretha of Brabant.

Otto first married Margaret of Cleves in 1240. They had:

- Elizabeth of Guelders, married Adolf VIII of Berg
- Margaret of Guelders, married Enguerrand IV, Lord de Coucy

Otto married as his second wife Philippe of Dammartin in 1253, and they had:

- Reginald I, Count of Guelders
- Phillipa of Guelders, married Waleran II, Lord of Valkenburg.
- Margaret of Guelders, married Dietrich VII, Count of Cleves.
- Maria of Guelders

== See also ==
- Arnhem

== Sources ==
- Baldwin, Philip Bruce (2014). Pope Gregory X and the Crusades. The Boydell Press.
- Grotius, Hugo (2000). Waszink, Jan; Holzapfel, Marieke; Kool, Wouter; Lahey, Michiel; van der Loo, Manon; Slootmans, Marina; de Wreede, Liesbeth (eds.). Liber de Antiquitate Reipublicae Batavicae. Van Gorcum & Comp.
- Jensen, Carsten Selch (2017). "Stedinger Crusades (1233–1234)". In Murray, Alan V. (ed.). The Crusades: An Encyclopedia. ABC-CLIO.
- Pollock, M. A. (2015). Scotland, England and France After the Loss of Normandy, 1204-1296: "Auld Amitie". The Boydell Press.

Preceded by Gerard III	Count of Guelders; 1229–1271	Succeeded by Reginald I
