= Duchy of Limburg =

Duchy of the Low Countries (1065–1795)

Coordinates: 50°37′N 5°56′E

Duchy of Limburg Herzogtum Limburg (German) Duché de Limbourg (French) Hertogdom Limburg (Dutch) Härzochdom Limbursch (Ripuarian) Hertogdom Limburg (Limburgish) Dutcheye do Limbork (Walloon)
- 1065–1797
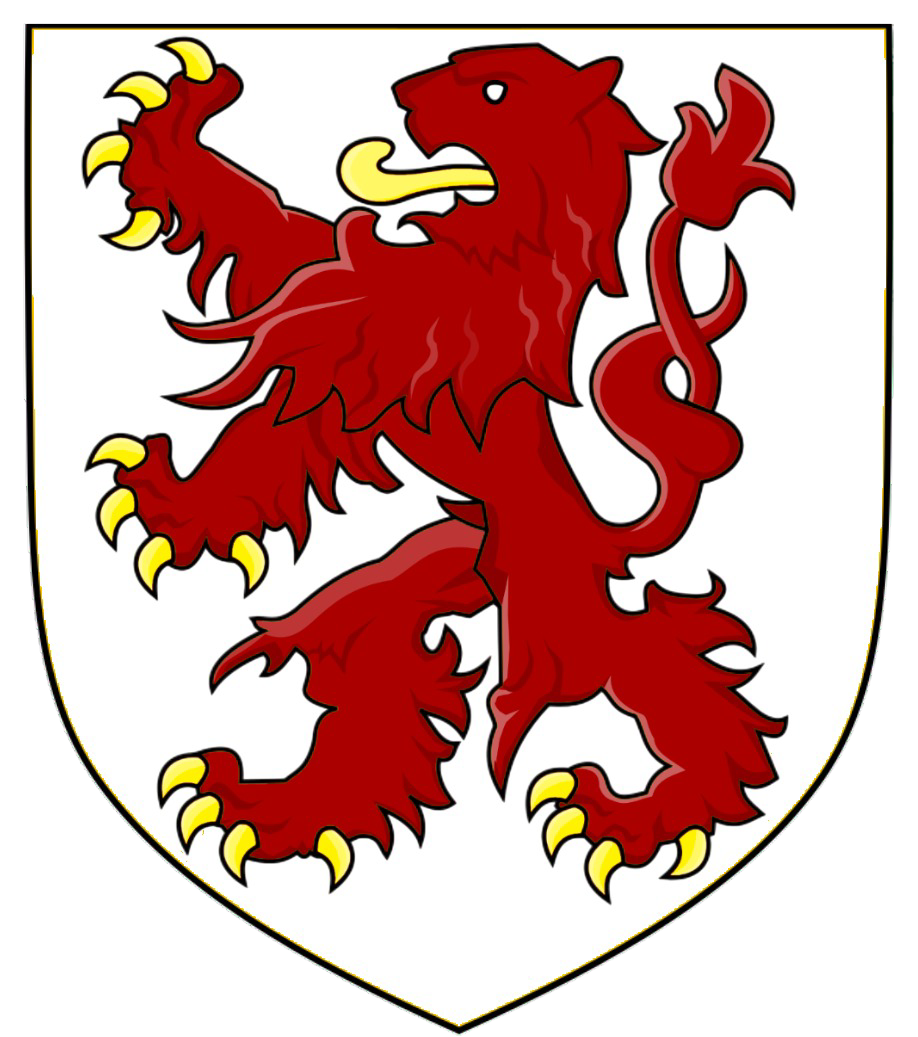
- Banner of arms (Beyeren Armorial) Coat of arms

- Duchy of Limburg around 1350
- Status: State of the Holy Roman Empire part of the Burgundian Netherlands (1430–1482) part of the Habsburg Netherlands (1482–1581) part of the Southern Netherlands (1581–1795)
- Capital: Limbourg
- Common languages: Limburgish, Walloon
- Religion: Roman Catholicism
- Government: Monarchy
- Duke
  - 1065–1082: Waleran I, Count of Limburg
  - 1082–1119: Henry I, Duke of Limburg and Lower Lorraine
  - 1288–1294: John I, Duke of Brabant, Limburg and Lothier
  - 1494–1506: Philip III, Duke of Burgundy, King of Castile–León etc
  - 1792–1794: Francis I, Duke of Lorraine, Holy Roman Emperor etc.
- Historical era: Middle Ages
  - Established: 1065
  - Passed to Brabant: June 5, 1288
  - Passed to Burgundy: 1406
  - Peace of Westphalia: 1648
  - Treaty of Utrecht: 1713
  - Disestablished: 1797
  - Annexed by France: 1797
Preceded by	Succeeded by
Lower Lorraine	Burgundian Netherlands

The Duchy of Limburg or Limbourg was an imperial estate of the Holy Roman Empire. Much of the area of the duchy is today located within Liège Province of Belgium, with a small portion in the municipality of Voeren, an exclave of the neighbouring Limburg Province. Its chief town was Limbourg-sur-Vesdre, in today's Liège Province.

The duchy evolved from a county which was first assembled under the lordship of a junior member of the House of Ardenne–Luxembourg, Frederick. He and his successors built and apparently named the fortified town which the county, and later the duchy, were named after. Despite being a younger son, Frederick had a successful career and also became duke of Lower Lotharingia in 1046. Lordship of this county was not originally automatically linked with possession of a ducal title (Herzog in German, Hertog in Dutch), and the same title was also eventually contested by the counts of Brabant, leading to the invention of two new ducal titles: Brabant and Limbourg.

The extinction of the line of Frederick's grandson Henry in 1283 sparked the War of the Limburg Succession, whereafter Limburg was ruled by the dukes of Brabant in personal union, eventually being grouped together with the Brabantian "Overmaas" territories bordering it (including Dalhem, Valkenburg, and 's-Hertogenrade), to be one of the Seventeen Provinces of the Burgundian Netherlands. Unlike other parts of this province, the lands of the duchy stayed intact within the Southern Netherlands, under Habsburg control, after the divisions caused by the Eighty Years' War and the War of the Spanish Succession. However finally, after the failed Brabant Revolution in 1789, the duchy's history was terminated with the occupation by French Revolutionary troops in 1793. The easternmost lands were reunited within modern Belgium only after World War I.

The duchy was multilingual, being the place where Dutch, French, and German dialects border upon each other and coexist at their geographical extremes, both now and in medieval times. Its northern and eastern borders are the approximate boundaries of the modern state of Belgium with the Netherlands and Germany, at their "tripoint". The eastern part, which includes Eupen, is the administrative capital and northernmost part of the modern German-speaking Community of Belgium. The duchy also included the main part of the Pays de Herve, famous for its pungent-smelling soft cheese known as Limburger or Herve.

== Geography ==
The state's territory was situated in the Low Countries between the river Meuse (Maas) in the west and the Imperial city of Aachen in the east. These lands had formed a very large lordship under Baelen on the route between the important imperial centres of Liège and Aachen. They had chiefly been used for hunting, and not yet developed very much for agriculture. Frederick selected a natural prominence at an important intersection of roads which had probably been called "Heimersberch" or Hèvremont, and built his new comital caput there in about 1030. Kupper has proposed that the new name for this place, Limburg, was taken from the name of the fort of the ruling Salian dynasty who had in about the same period given their possession to become Limburg Abbey.

The most important towns in the eventual duchy were Limbourg, the capital, and Eupen. The Limburg estates were commonly divided into five legal districts (Hochbänke):

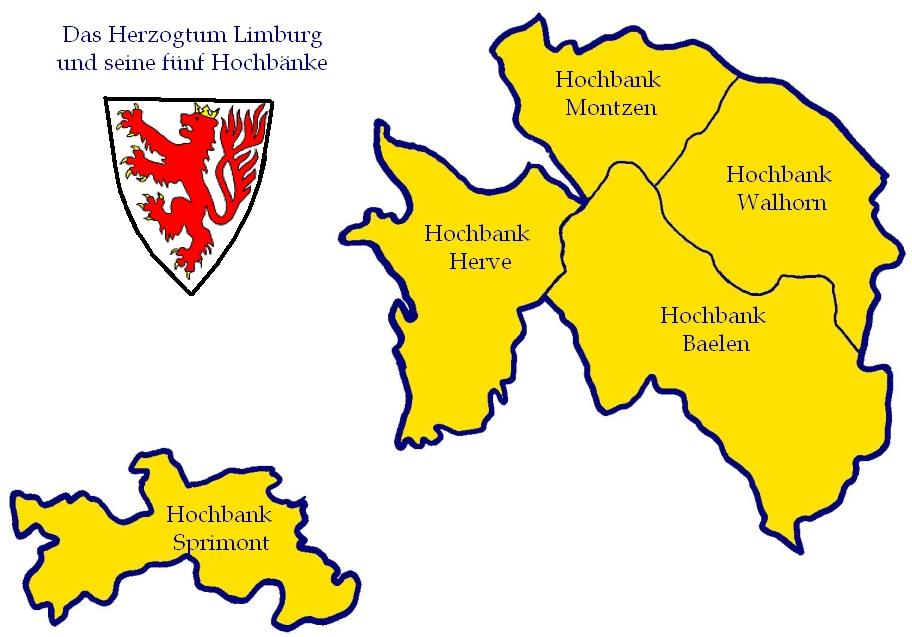
Basic administrative parts until the French revolution, including detached Sprimont

- The original manor of Baelen in the southeast with the fortified town of Limburg, and also Eupen, and Welkenraedt;
- Herve in the southwest with Dison, Thimister and Clermont.
- Montzen (today part of Plombières) in the northwest with Kelmis, Moresnet, and Teuven;
- Walhorn in the northeast with Eynatten, Hauset, and Lontzen;
- The southwestern exclave of Sprimont, surrounded by the Prince-Bishopric of Liège.

The territory of Limburg formed a complex patchwork with those of the Prince-Bishopric of Liège, based to the west, the Principality of Stavelot-Malmedy to the south, and the County of Luxembourg, to the south. In the east the main neighbour was the Rhenish Duchy of Jülich. To the north were the smaller lordships such as Slenaken, and Wittem and the lordships of Dalhem and Rolduc ('s-Hertogenrade), today in the Dutch province of Limburg, which came under Brabant control and were referred to in that context as the "Overmaas" territory, or even Limburg. In the northeast was the imperial city of Aachen.

Linguistically Limburg was situated on the border of Germanic with Romance Europe. While in the northern and eastern districts Limburgish and Ripuarian dialects were spoken, the southwestern part around Herve was dominated by Walloon.

== History ==
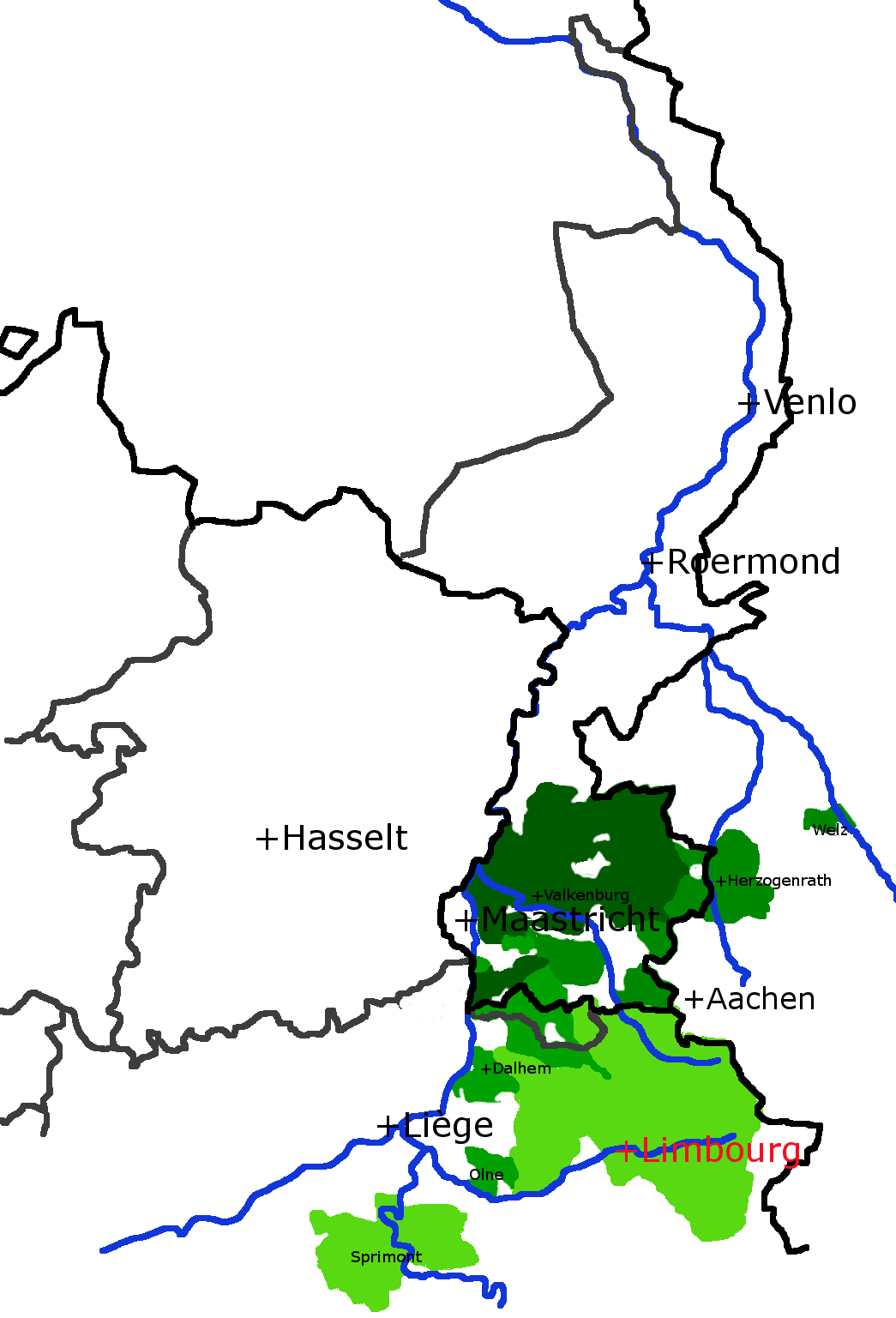
This shows the medieval "lands of Overmaas" and the Duchy of Limburg possessed in the Middle Ages by the dukes of Brabant. Together these formed one province in the Seventeen Provinces, sometimes referred to as Limburg. The dark lines are modern borders.

The territory of the duchy of Limburg was formed in the 11th century around the town of Limbourg in present-day Wallonia. About 1020, Duke Frederick of Lower Lorraine, a descendant of Count Palatine Wigeric of Lotharingia, had Limbourg Castle built on the banks of the Vesdre river. His estates then comprised the districts of Baelen (with Limbourg), Herve, Montzen (since 1975 part of Plombières), Walhorn, and the southwestern exclave of Sprimont. Frederick's eventual successor (probably a grandson) was Henry, although between them was Count Udon, who about 1065 was also called a "count of Limburg". (It has been proposed that he married Frederick's daughter, and was the father of Henry.)

Henry also claimed Frederick's ducal title, which was finally acknowledged by Emperor Henry IV in 1101. The Duchy of Limburg, like most of modern Belgium, was originally within the Duchy of Lower Lorraine. For a while, Lower Lorraine had its own duke. It is from this duchy that the Duchy of Limbourg derived its ducal status (as did the Duchy of Brabant, in a competitive claim to succession). This meant that Lower Lorraine came to have two duchies, that of Brabant, and that of Limburg, and the title of Duke of Lothier, still held by Brabant, eventually became ineffective. As the Lorrainian ducal dignity was contested the title "duke of Limburg" arose, achieving confirmation from Emperor Frederick Barbarossa in 1165.

The rise of the Limburg dynasty continued, when Duke Waleran III in 1214 became Count of Luxembourg by marriage with the heiress Ermesinde and his son Henry IV in 1225 became Count of Berg as husband of heiress Irmgard.

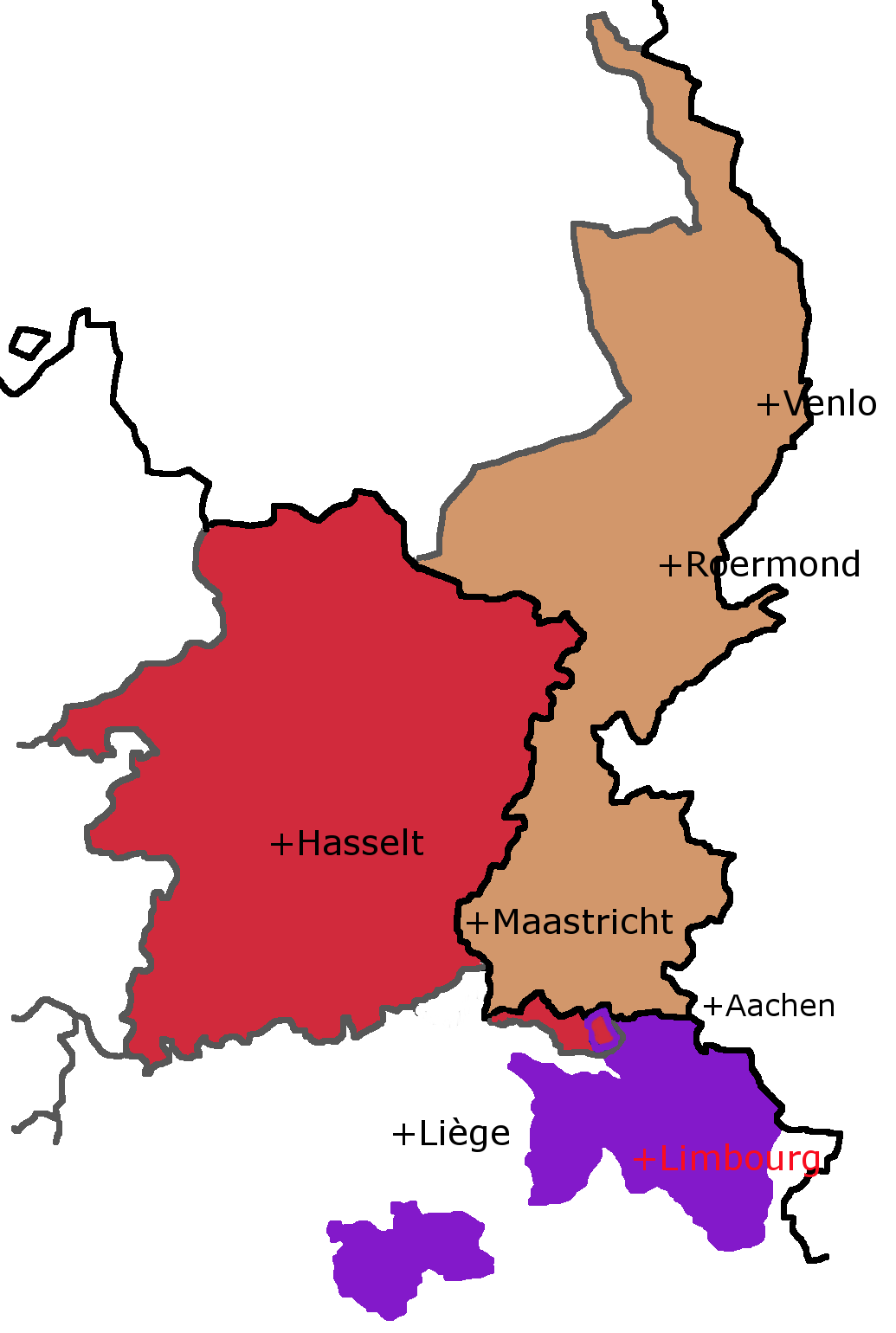
This shows the two modern provinces called Limburg next to the medieval duchy they are both named after. The small overlap is Teuven and Remersdaal, in eastern Voeren, a part of modern Belgian Limburg since 1977.

However, upon the death of Henry's son Waleran IV in 1279, leaving only one heiress Irmgard, who had married Count Reginald I of Guelders but died childless in 1283, the War of the Limburg Succession broke out. The duke of Brabant won the final Battle of Worringen in 1288, thereby gaining control of the Duchy of Limburg with the consent of King Rudolph I of Germany. Though it shared the fate of Brabant, Limburg remained a separate Imperial State, which in 1404 passed from Joanna of Brabant to Anthony of Valois, son of the Burgundian duke Philip the Bold. After the death of Mary of Burgundy in 1482, it passed to her descendants from the Austrian House of Habsburg. Combined with the Lands of Overmaas (the lands beyond the Meuse: Dalhem, Herzogenrath and Valkenburg) and Maastricht, the duchy became one of the Seventeen Provinces held by the Habsburgs within the Burgundian Circle established in 1512. Significant towns in Limburg proper were Herve, Montzen, Lontzen, Eupen, Baelen and Esneux.

After the abdication of Emperor Charles V in 1556, the Burgundian fiefs passed to his son King Philip II of Spain. The measures of the Council of Troubles implemented by Philip's stern governor, the duke of Alba, sparked the Eighty Years' War, ended by the 1648 Peace of Westphalia. An area known as Limburg of the States, consisting of parts of Overmaas (but no part of the Duchy of Limburg itself), was ceded to the Dutch Republic. In 1661, the Dutch and the Spanish agreed on a re-partition of the county of Dalhem. The Duchy of Limburg itself remained undivided under Spanish Habsburg rule as part of the Southern Netherlands, passing to the Austrian Habsburgs under the Treaty of Utrecht in 1713.

When the region was occupied by the French in 1794, the Austrian Duchy of Limburg proper was disbanded and was incorporated into the département of Ourthe, while most of the Overmaas lands became part of the department Meuse-Inférieure, which is the basis of today's Belgian and Dutch provinces called Limburg. After the defeat of the French empire, the eastern, German-speaking part of duchy's lands were given to Prussia in the Congress of Vienna along with several other territories along what is today the Belgian-German border, but after the First World War, these lands became Belgian, re-uniting the original parts of the old duchy.

== See also ==
- Dukes of Limburg
- Duchy of Limburg (1839–1867)
- Limburger cheese
- Neutral Moresnet
