= Adolf VIII of Berg =

Eldest son of Count Adolf VII of Berg and Margaret of Hochstaden

Adolf VIII of Berg (also referred to as Adolf V) (c. 1240 – 28 September 1296) was the eldest son of Count Adolf VII of Berg and Margaret of Hochstaden.

In 1259, Adolf succeeded his father as Count of Berg. King Rudolph I of Germany allowed Adolf to move his mint to Wipperfürth in 1275. In 1276 Adolf granted city rights to Ratingen and in 1282 to Wipperfürth. Adolf tried in vain to have his brother Conrad, Provost of Cologne, installed as Archbishop of Cologne after the death of Engelbert II of Falkenstein in 1274, but Siegfried II of Westerburg was chosen instead.

In 1279 Adolf's uncle Waleran IV, Duke of Limburg died leaving one daughter, Ermengarde, wife of Reginald I, Count of Guelders. When she died in 1280 without issue, her husband claimed the Duchy of Limburg even though Adolf also had a claim to Limburg as Waleran's eldest nephew. Adolf tried unsuccessfully to assert his claim and in 1283 he sold his right to Duke John I of Brabant. The counter-claims of Duke John and Reginald I ultimately led to the Battle of Worringen in 1288 in which Adolf supported the victorious Brabant. Archbishop Siegfried was captured and imprisoned by Adolf in Schloss Burg for 13 months. As a result of the victory, Adolf was also able to elevate Düsseldorf to the level of city. Through trickery, Archbishop Siegfried was able to capture Adolf in 1292 and held him in prison until he died on 28 September 1296.

In 1249, Adolf was betrothed to Elisabeth of Guelders, daughter of Otto II, Count of Guelders and half-sister of Reginald I, his rival to the Duchy of Limburg. Elisabeth died 31 March 1315 and is buried with her husband in the Church of Solingen-Gräfrath. As Adolf and Elisabeth had no issue, Adolf's brother William I of Berg succeeded him as Count of Berg.

| Preceded by Adolf VII | Count of Berg; 1259–1296 | Succeeded by William I |
