= Ermengarde of Limburg =

Ermengarde (died 1283) was the ruling suo jure Duchess of Limburg from 1279 to 1283. She was the daughter of Judith of Kleve and Waleran IV, Duke of Limburg. She was named after her paternal grandmother.

It is possible she was the only child of her parents, but is also equally possible she had a younger sister, Sophia.

Ermengarde married count Reginald I of Guelders. She died in 1283. Her death without issue triggered the War of the Limburg Succession. The Duchy of Limburg was subsequently added into the Duchy of Brabant after her husband was defeated in the decisive Battle of Worringen in 1288.

== Sources ==
- Pollock, M. A. (2015). Scotland, England and France After the Loss of Normandy, 1204-1296: "Auld Amitie". The Boydell Press. ISBN 978-1-84383-992-7.
