= Eduard Gerhardt =

German painter

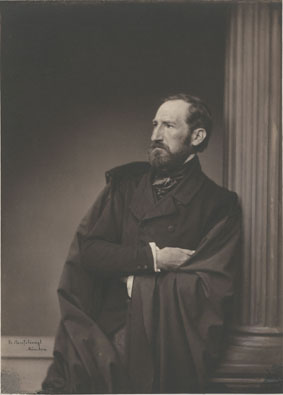
Eduard Gerhardt; photograph by Franz Hanfstaengl

Eduard Gerhardt (29 April 1813 – 6 March 1888) was a German painter, lithographer and architect.

== Biography ==
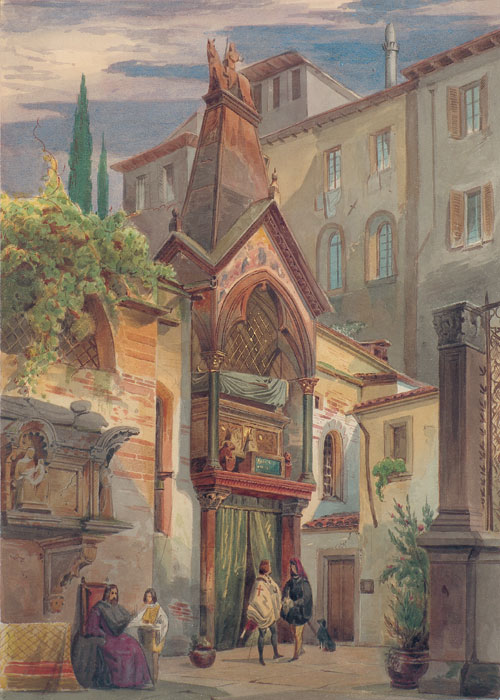
View of the Scaliger Tombs in Verona, c. 1845

Gerhardt was born in Erfurt in 1813. He began his career as a lithographer, and then studied architecture at Cologne and under Semper at Dresden. In 1837 or 1838 he took up painting at Munich. A series of views of Cologne Cathedral attracted the attention of Frederick William IV of Prussia, whose assistance enabled Gerhardt to continue his studies in 1848 in Italy and the Iberian Peninsula. For some time he instructed the princes of the royal household at Lisbon, but in 1851 returned to Munich. He died in Munich in 1888.

== Work ==
He is noted for his portrayal of Moorish architecture. Among his works are:

- “Palace of the Inquisition at Cordova” (1863, Neue Pinakothek)
- “Lion Court at the Alhambra, Granada” (1861, Neue Pinakothek)
- “Saint Marc's, Venice” (1864, Neue Pinakothek)
- “The Alhambra by Moonlight”
- “Generalife”
- “The Comares Tower” (Schack Gallery, Munich)

== See also ==
- List of German painters
