= Adolf VII of Berg =

Count of Berg (1247–1259)

Adolf VII of Berg (also referred to as Adolf IV, especially in the Netherlands and in Germany) (c. 1220 – 22 April 1259) was the eldest son of Henry IV, Duke of Limburg and Irmgard of Berg.

In 1247, Adolf succeeded his father as Count of Berg while his brother Waleran succeeded as Duke of Limburg. Adolf stood with his brother-in-law, Conrad of Hochstaden, Archbishop of Cologne, in the anti-Hohenstaufen camp, supporting King William II of Holland and received significant Imperial fiefs, including Kaiserswerth, Remagen, Rath, Mettmann and the Duisberg district of the national forest.

In 1234, Adolf participated in the Crusade against the Stedinger. In 1255, he laid the foundation of the gothic Cathedral the Altenberger Dom in Altenberg along with his brother Waleran. He died on 22 April 1259 as a result of wounds received during a tournament at Neuss.

== Family and children ==
He married Margaret of Hochstaden, daughter of Lothar I, Count of Hochstaden. She died on 30 January 1314, aged more than 100 years. Adolf and Margaret had the following children:

1. Adolf (c. 1240–1296)
2. William (c. 1242–1308)
3. Henry (bef. 1247–1290/96)
4. Engelbert, Provost of St. Cunibert, Cologne
5. Walram, Provost of St. Maria, Cologne
6. Conrad (died 25 May 1313), Provost of Cologne Cathedral, Bishop of Münster (1306–1310)
7. Irmgard (c. 1256–1294), married Eberhard II, Count of the Mark

== Sources ==
- Loud, Graham A.; Schenk, Jochen, eds. (2017). The Origins of the German Principalities, 1100-1350: Essays by German Historians.

Preceded by Henry IV, Duke of Limburg	Count of Berg; 1247–1259	Succeeded by Adolf VIII
