= Eberhard, Count of Mark =

Count of the Mark (1277-1308)

Eberhard I, Count of the Mark
- Eberhard's coat of arms
- Born: c. 1255
- Died: 4 July 1308
- Noble family: House of La Marck
- Spouses: Irmgard of Berg; Maria of Looz
- Issue: Engelbert II
- Father: Engelbert I, Count of the Mark
- Mother: Kunigunde of Blieskastel

Eberhard (c. 1255–4 July 1308) was a German nobleman. He was Count of Mark from 1277 until his death. He was the son of Engelbert I, Count of the Mark and Kunigunde of Blieskastel (died 1265), daughter of Count Henry I of Blieskastel. He is numbered Eberhard I of the House of La Marck or sometimes Eberhard II, after Eberhard I, Count of Berg-Altena.

In 1277, Count Herman of Lohn abducted Eberhard's father Engelbert I, Count of the Mark near Tecklenburg and imprisoned him in the Castle of Bredevoort, where he later died. In 1278 Eberhard took revenge and conquered the castle.

From 1281, Eberhard formed an alliance with the Counts of Berg, Cleve and Jülich against the Electorate of Cologne and gained the independence of the County of Mark from the Archbishop of Cologne after the victory in the Battle of Worringen in 1288. He also obtained Brakel, Westhofen and Waltrop. Eberhard died 4 July 1308 and was buried in Fröndenberg Monastery.

== Marriage and children ==
Eberhard married first about 29 January 1273 to Irmgard of Berg (c.1256–24 March 1294), daughter of Adolf VII of Berg. They had seven children:

- Engelbert II (c.1275–1328)
- Adolph II of La Marck, Prince-bishop of Liège (1278–1344)
- Margaret (c.1280–after 14 August 1327), married in 1299 Gerhard of Katzenelnbogen (c.1270–1311/12)
- Kunigunde († after 25 February 1343), married in 1320 Dietrich II of Heinsberg-Blankenburg († 1361)
- Irmgard
- Konrad (1291/94–1353), married Elisabeth of Cleves
- Catharine, abbess of Froendenberg (born c.1293)

Eberhard married second Maria of Looz and had:

- Richarda, married John III of Reifferscheidt-Bedburg
- Johanna, married Philip IV of Reifferscheidt-Wildenberg
- Engelbert I, Lord of Loverval

Eberhard, Count of Mark House of La Marck Born: c. 1255 Died: 1308
Preceded by Engelbert I	Count of the Mark; 1277–1308	Succeeded by Engelbert II
