= Bredevoort Castle =

Castle in the Netherlands

- Bredevoort, the Netherlands
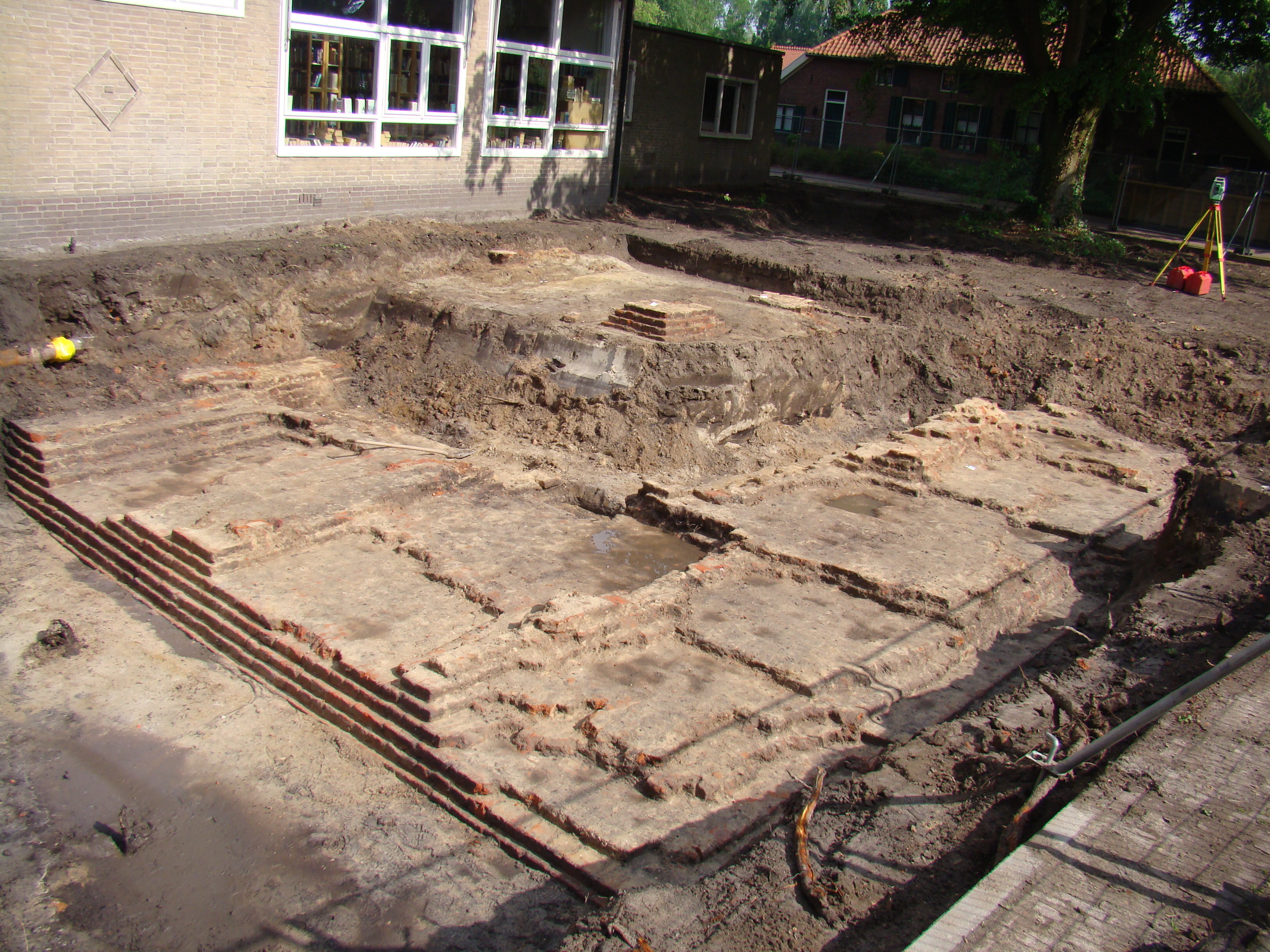
- The Ruïns of Bredevoort

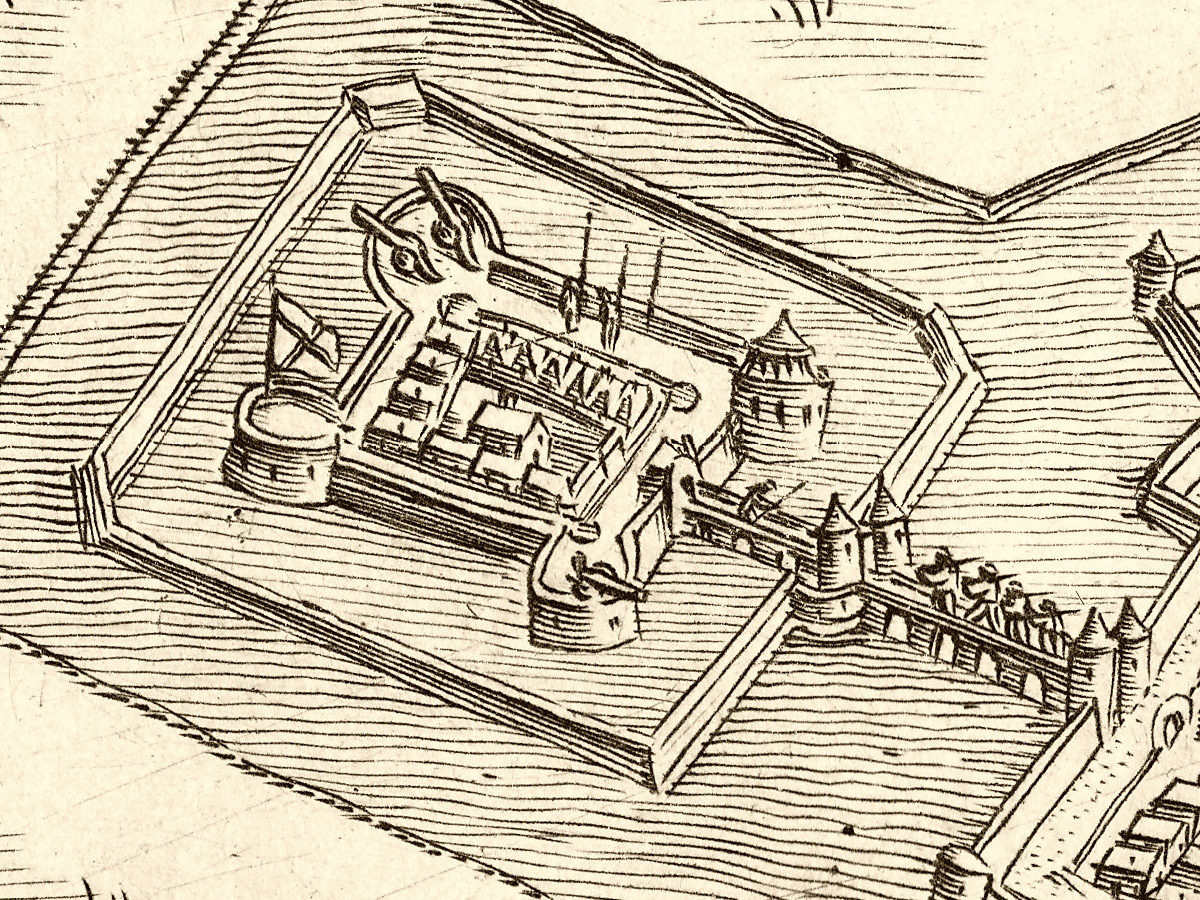
- The castle in 1597

Site information
- Type: Castle
- Condition: Demolished

Location
- The Netherlands
- Coordinates: 51°57′N 6°37′E

Site history
- Built: 12th century
- Materials: Brick
- Demolished: 1646

The Bredevoort Castle (Dutch: Kasteel Bredevoort) was a castle in the city of Bredevoort, Guelders in the Netherlands.

== History ==
The earliest known mention of the castle dates from 1188 as "castrum Breidervort". On the forecourt of the castle developed a small city during the time. In 1646 the Powder Tower of the castle was struck by lightning. The explosion did hit the castle and city which was badly damaged. The castle was a ruin. Lord Haersolte and his family were all killed by the explosion. Only one son, Anthonie, survived the disaster. He was not at home during the disaster. In April 2009 there were found heavy wall remnants on the site during excavations. Some parts of the Curtain wall of the castle are made visible by brassmarking on the square.
