= Reginald I of Guelders =

CoA Count of Guelders

Reginald I of Guelders (1255 – October 9, 1326 in Monfort) was Count of Guelders and Zutphen from January 10, 1271, until his death.

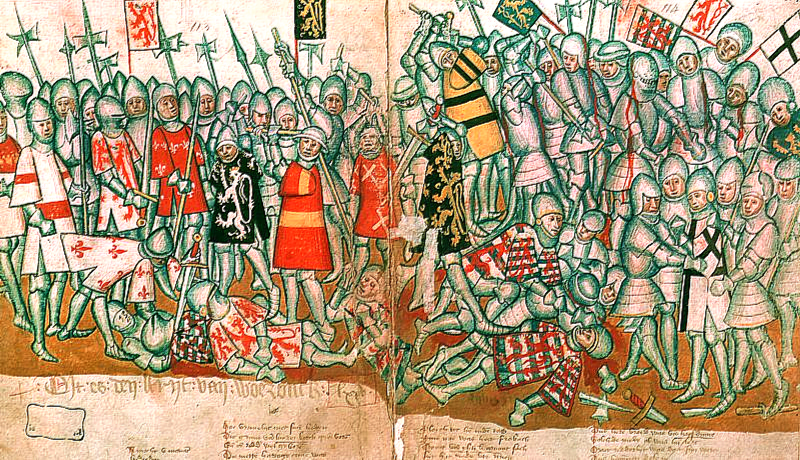
Battle of Worringen 1288

== Life ==
He was the son of Otto II, Count of Guelders and Philippe of Dammartin. In 1276 he married Ermengarde of Limburg of Limburg, only daughter and heiress of Waleran IV, Duke of Limburg.

In 1279 he became Duke of Limburg jure uxoris and when Ermengarde died childless in 1283, he ruled alone in the Duchy of Limburg. Reginald was captured by Daniel van Bouchout during the Battle of Woeringen in 1288. He was released after he had renounced all claims to the Duchy of Limburg.

In 1286 he remarried Margaret of Flanders (1272–1331), daughter of Guy, Count of Flanders and Isabelle of Luxembourg. They had:

- Reginald II (1295–1343)
- Margaret, married Dietrich VIII, Count of Cleves
- Guy
- Elisabeth (died 1354), abbess at Cologne
- Philippa, nun at Cologne.

Financially ruined after the Battle of Woeringen, Guelders came under the influence of his father-in-law, the Count of Flanders. From 1318, he was replaced by his son, who imprisoned his father in 1320 in the Montfort Castle and governed as "son of the Count". Reginald I died there six years later.

Preceded by Otto II	Count of Guelders; 1271–1318	Succeeded by Reginald II
Preceded by Waleran IV	Duke of Limburg; 1280–1288	Succeeded by John I
