= Adolf I, Count of Mark =

Count of the Mark

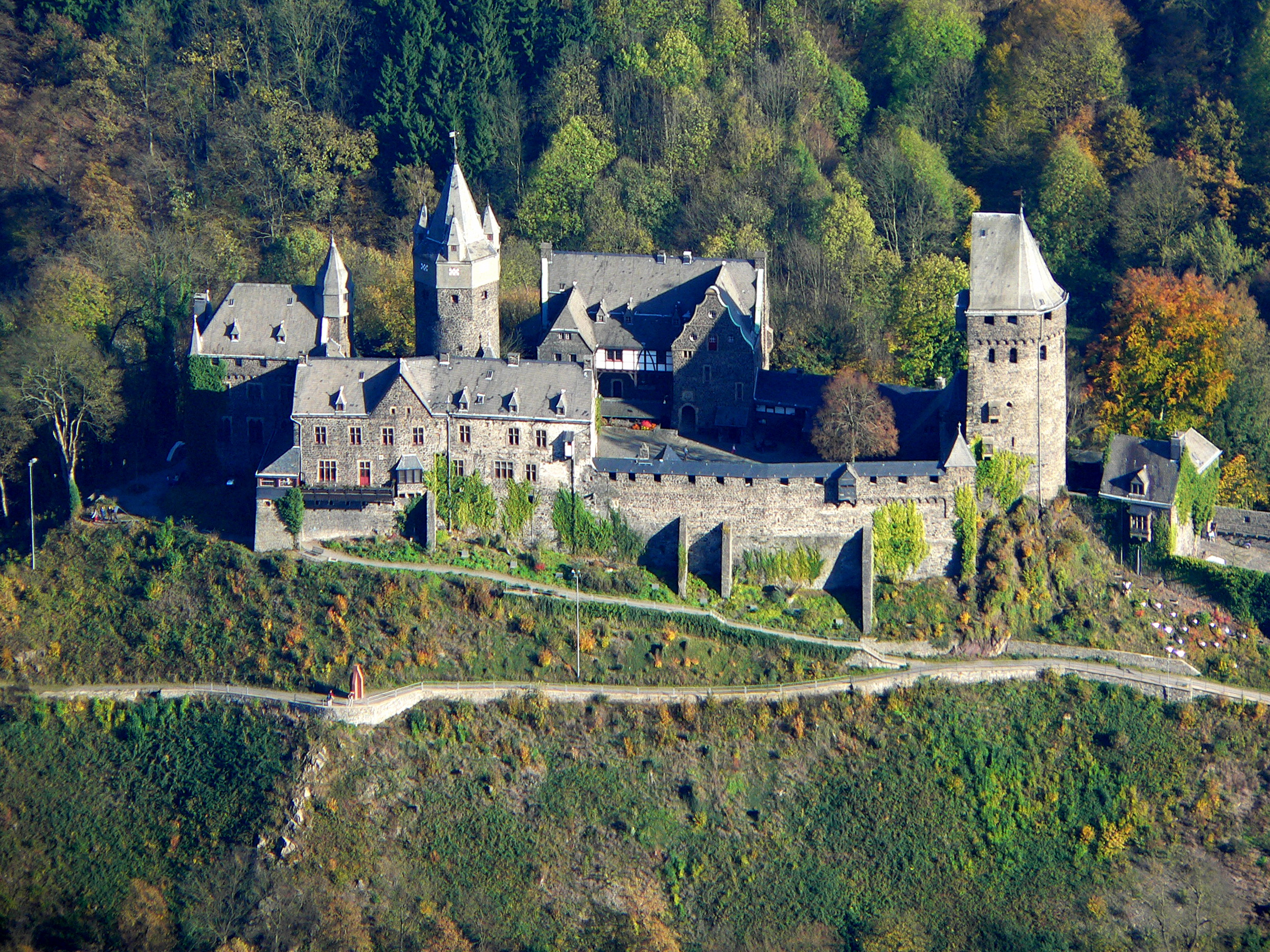
Castle Altena in Altena. First residence of the Counts of Altena, the title and family name were later changed, by Adolf I, to La Mark

Coat of arms of the counts of the Mark

Adolf I, Count de la Mark (German: Adolf I. Graf von der Mark und Krickenbeck; c. 1182? – 28 June 1249), until 1226 also known as Adolf I, Count of Altena-Mark. He was son of Frederick I, Count of Berg-Altena and Alveradis of Krickenbeck, daughter of Reiner of Krieckenbeck-Millendonk.

Adolf belonged to a collateral line of the counts of Berg and was founder of the new noble branch of the Counts de la Mark.

Following the year 1226, he reunited the lands of the Counts of Berg-Altena, which had been in possession of the counts of Altena and Isenberg, the senior lines of the family ever since the division of their heritage in 1180, thereby forming the county of Mark with its capital city of Hamm. Moreover, Adolf I was reeve of the monasteries of Cappenberg and Werden.

== Date of birth ==
Adolf's date of birth is unclear. Commonly accepted is the year 1194, though sometimes an earlier date has been assumed.

In his book Die Landstände der Grafschaft Mark bis zum Jahre 1510: Mit Urkundlichen Beilagen, Rudolf Schulze determined Adolf's date of birth to be in 1164. This assertion does not tie with his parents' life data.

Referring to various sources, the year 1199 is proposed by Genealogie Mittelalter.

At that time Adolf must have been born already, though; in 1198 his father Frederick had erected Burg Mark on the hill belonging to Oberhof Mark near Hamm on behalf of his son.

In fact Adolf signed as a witness a charter in 1194, and thus logic requires that he had reached majority by that time. In medieval Germany majority was bound to the ability to serve in battle or bearing arms. This was usually between 12 and 15, so that Adolf had to be born at least 12 years before signing the charter in 1194. Referring to this Adolf was born in the period between 1179 and 1182.

Another legal fact supporting this theory is that Adolf's father died either in 1198 or 1199 and he became the new Count of Altena-Mark and Krickenbeck. If he was not old enough to rule by that time his mother or a close relative would have become regent for him. But there is no sign of this in any charters of the time. Instead Adolf is signing further charters; in 1202 he names himself in another charter Adolfus puer comes de Marke. The puer comes was often translated as "young Count" but in medieval times the Latin word puer is also used for the social status known as knave or squire, or by simpler means as Knight in apprenticeship. In 1205 he signs again a charter but this time only using his legal name and title as Adolphus com. de Marka without the puer prefixed to the title. His time as squire was seemingly over. So any assumed date of birth after 1182 becomes more unlikely. Noble boys started their career at age 12, but more normally at 14 years, the same age they gained their majority. The apprenticeship lasted usually until the age of 20 or 21, before the squire was finally knighted. This fits perfectly with Adolf being puer comes... in 1202 and com. de Marka in 1205, even by means of the age, if he was born in 1182 he would have been 20 by 1202 and about 23 by 1205.

== Life ==
Like his father Adolf I became Count of Berg-Altena and Krickenbeck and reeve of the monasteries of Werden and Cappenberg.

From 1202, Adolf took on the sobriquet of "von der Mark", after this new main residency which his father had built on land originally acquired from either the Archbishop of Cologne (Philipp of Heinsberg) or the noble family of Rüdenberg.

As with the whole family, Adolf was drawn into the German Crown Heritage Dispute. Sources differ for which side he fought. Stirnberg has it that Adolf was on the Staufers side right from the beginning. Possibly Adolf stayed undecided until he finally decided with the Staufer in 1212.

However, in 1225 Adolf seemed to have established himself as loyal kinsman of the Emperor and the Archbishop of Cologne.

After the conflict opposing his cousins Frederick of Isenberg and Engelbert II of Berg, Archbishop of Cologne, which ended with the murder of the Archbishop and the condemnation and execution of Frederick, Adolf was awarded large portions of his cousin's, Frederick of Isenberg, properties, thereby re-uniting most of the Berg inheritance.

== Death ==
Adolf died on 28 June 1249; he is buried in Cappenberg Abbey. He was succeeded by his son

- Engelbert I (1220-1277), Count of La Mark.
- Otto La Marck (1212-1262), a Bishop

Adolf I, Count of Mark House of La Marck Born: c.1194 Died: 28 June 1249
Preceded by Friedrich I	Count of the Mark; 1198–1249	Succeeded by Engelbert I
