= Waleran IV of Limburg =

Waleran IV (or Walram IV) (died 1279) was the duke of Limburg from 1247 to his death.

== Life ==
Waleran was the son and successor of Henry IV and Ermengarde, countess of Berg.

He played a great part in the politics of the Great Interregnum in Germany. He left the Hohenstaufen fold and supported William II of Holland as king. He was sent in an embassy to Henry III of England and after William's death, supported Henry's brother Richard, earl of Cornwall, as king. In 1272, he was party to the nobles who offered the crown to Ottokar II of Bohemia and then Rudolph of Habsburg.

In 1252, he intervened in the War of the Succession of Flanders and Hainault, at the side of Jean d'Avesnes. After 1258, he fell out with John I of Brabant, putting an end to sixty years of good relations with the dukes of Brabant.

Waleran frequently intervened in the business of the archbishop of Cologne in his constant fight with the bourgeoisie of the city.

He married twice: first with Jutta, daughter of Dietrich V, Count of Cleves; and secondly with Kunigunde, daughter of Otto III, Margrave of Brandenburg. His daughter with Jutta, Ermengarde, succeeded him as Duchess of Limburg and married Reginald I of Guelders.

Preceded by Henry IV	Duke of Limburg; 1247–1279	Succeeded by Ermengarde; Reginald I of Guelders
