= Youth Hostels Association =

Youth Hostels Association may refer to:

- YHA Australia
- Youth Hostels Association (England & Wales)
- Scottish Youth Hostels Association
- Youth Hostels Association of India
- Youth Hostel Association of New Zealand
- Hostelling International, an international federation of national youth hostel associations
