= Hostelling International Northern Ireland =

British nonprofit organization

Hostelling International Northern Ireland (Youth Hostel Association Of Northern Ireland Limited)
- Abbreviation: HINI
- Formation: 1931
- Type: Registered charity
- Legal status: Company limited by guarantee
- Purpose: Youth hostel accommodation and education
- Headquarters: Belfast, Northern Ireland
- Location(s): 4 hostels - Belfast Central, Whitepark Bay, Armagh (affiliate) & Bushmills
- Region served: Northern Ireland
- Members: ▼1,708 (18/19)
- Key people: Jacqueline Hill (Chairperson); Dermot O'Lynn (Chief Executive)
- Affiliations: Hostelling International
- Revenue: ▼£765,600 (18/19)
- Staff: 19 (18/19)
- Website: HINI website

Hostelling International Northern Ireland (HINI) is a not-for-profit organisation providing youth hostel accommodation in Northern Ireland. It is a member of the Hostelling International federation.

== Foundation ==
The Youth Hostels Association of Northern Ireland was formed in 1931, around the same time as the Youth Hostels Association (England & Wales) YHA(E&W) and the Scottish Youth Hostels Association (SYHA). All three arose from a slightly earlier proposal to form the Youth Hostel Association of Great Britain.

Like all associations, in its early days it offered spartan facilities for those on walking or cycling holidays to give them the opportunity to explore and experience the countryside in Northern Ireland.

== Modern hostelling ==
The name of the association changed to Hostelling International Northern Ireland in the 1990s. It runs three hostels and has one affiliated hostel. The hostels are in Belfast, Bushmills and Whitepark Bay (near Ballycastle) and the newly refurbished affiliated hostel is situated in Armagh.

All of the hostels provide a range of rooms, including private twins and doubles, and are suitable for individual backpackers, couples, families and groups.

== See also ==
- Hostelling International
- Youth Hostels Association (England & Wales)
- Scottish Youth Hostels Association
- An Óige
