= Hostelling International – Canada =

Youth hostel organization

Hostelling International Canada (HI Canada) is an organization providing youth hostel accommodation in Canada. It is a member of the Hostelling International federation.

== History ==
The Youth Hostelling movement was started in 1909 by Richard Schirrmann, a German schoolteacher. The movement was disrupted by World War I and did not reach other countries until the 1930s. Following the launch of youth hostel associations in several European countries between 1930 and 1932, the idea spread across the Atlantic Ocean. Canada was slightly ahead of the United States, and the Canadian Youth Hostels Association was founded in 1933 (the American Youth Hostels Inc was not formed until 1934).

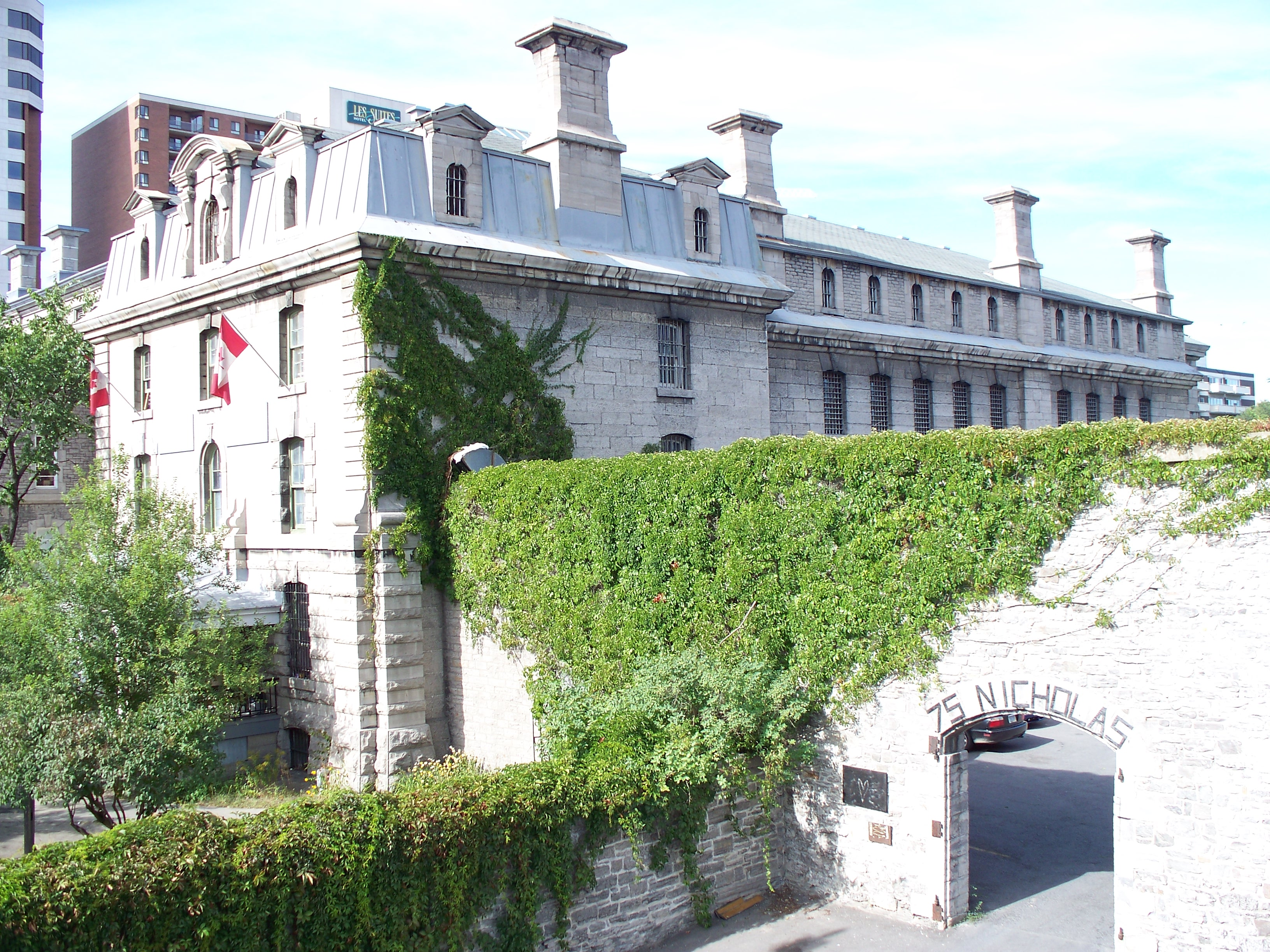
The Ottawa hostel is located in a former jail.

Canada's (and North America's) first hostel was opened in 1933 at Bragg Creek near Calgary, Alberta, by Mary Belle Barclay.

The national office was located in Calgary from 1933 to 1941. It was moved to Toronto in 1941, then Ottawa, Vancouver, and in 1971, it relocated back to Ottawa, where it remains as of 2015. In 1976, the name was changed to the Canadian Hostelling Association.

== Present day ==
As of 2019, the association had 53 hostels, with locations in nine provinces but none in the territories. In 2009, over 270,000 overnight stays were recorded in Canadian hostels. During the 2024 wildfire in Jasper, Alberta, the HI hostel located in the Jasper townsite was destroyed.

== Archives ==
The Glenbow Museum in Calgary holds the Canadian Hostelling Association archives, including a substantial number of sorted and catalogued records up to the mid-1980s, photographic records from the 1890s through the 2000s, and unprocessed records from the 1960s through the 2000s.
