= Pakistan Youth Hostels Association =

- Formation: December 1951
- Type: Youth organization
- Legal status: Non-profit
- Purpose: Hostelling in Pakistan
- Headquarters: Islamabad, Pakistan
- Parent organization: Hostelling International
- Website: PYHA

The Pakistan Youth Hostels Association is a non-profit, non-political, voluntary national organization providing hostelling services in Pakistan. It is financed by the Pakistan Youth Hostels Association Trust and by the Government of Pakistan. PYHA is a member of Hostelling International and now operates 16 hostels all over the country. The head office is in Islamabad, the capital of Pakistan and four new hostels are under construction in Karachi, Gilgit and Jamshoro. It is registered under the Societies' Act 1860 and is recognized by the Government of Pakistan as a national organization for promoting youth hostelling in the country. It is governed by its Constitution. The current Chairman of the organization is Mr Wasim Sajjad.

== History ==
In South Asia, youth hostelling started with the formation of a youth hostel group by Mr. W Cowley, ICS, and the then provincial Youth Organizer of the pre-independence Punjab. The first youth hostel was set up at Tara Devi near Simla in 1945.

Pakistan Youth Hostels Association was formed in December 1951. Mr. E.K. John Catchpole of the International Youth Hostel Federation was specially invited in the inaugural function. Later, Pakistan Youth Hostels Association was affiliated with the International Youth Hostel Federation, and the first Youth Hostel in Pakistan was constructed in 1951-52 in Bhurban, under the patronage of Mr. U. Karamat, the then Vice Chancellor of Punjab University.

== Pakistan Youth Hostels Association Trust ==
The PYHA Trust safeguards the money and property of the Association. It has an executive committee and a managing trustee. The income from the Trusts investments and properties is used to finance the running of the Association.

PYHA Hostel Islamabad

== See also ==
- Hostel
- Hostelling International
