= Connie Alexander =

Connie Alexander may refer to

- Connie Alexander (youth hostelling) (1897–1979), British pioneer of youth hostelling
- Constantine Alexander (born 1950), British judoka
