= German Youth Hostel Association =

German non-profit organization

Coordinates: 51°55′54″N 8°54′59″E

German Youth Hostel Association Deutsches Jugendherbergswerk - Hauptverband für Jugendwandern und Jugendherbergen e.V.
- Founded: 1919
- Founder: Richard Schirrmann, Wilhelm Münker and Julius Schult
- Type: registered society
- Purpose: Umbrella organization for youth hostels
- Location: Detmold
- Region served: national
- Website: www.jugendherberge.de

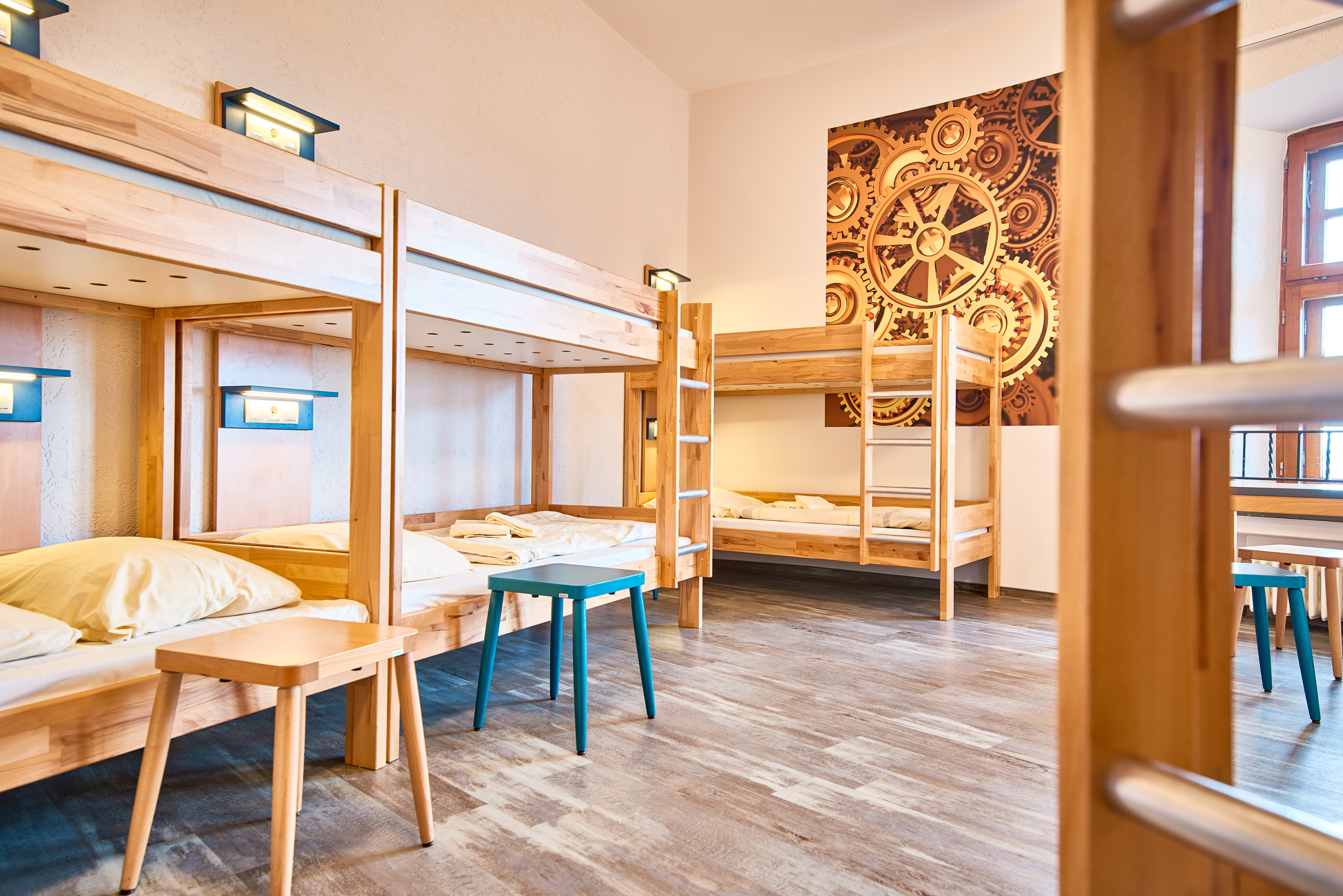
Room in Youth Hostel Wewelsburg near Paderborn

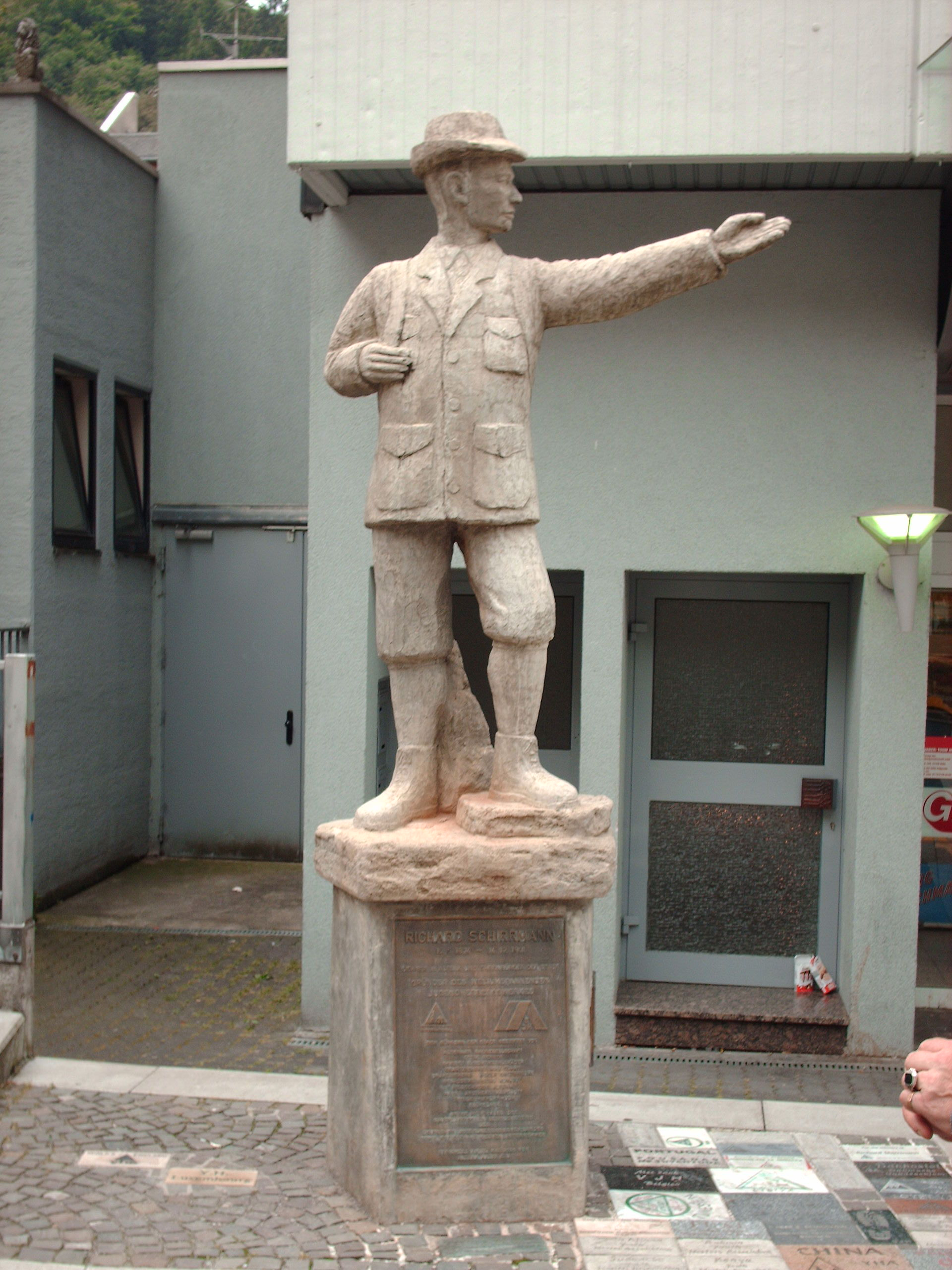
Statue of Richard Schirrmann, pioneer of the DJH, in Altena

The German Youth Hostel Association (German: Deutsches Jugendherbergswerk) or DJH is a non-profit registered organization (eingetragener Verein). It was founded in 1919 to provide affordable and safe accommodation for travellers, especially schools, youth groups and individuals across Germany. Today, with 438 youth hostels, it caters to schools, youth groups and are also open to anyone else seeking an alternative to hotels like families, backpackers, business travellers, etc. Through the state (Bundesland) associations, it is the representative of the 438 youth hostels in Germany (as at 2021) and thus the largest member of the international youth association, Hostelling International (HI). The headquarters has its seat in Detmold, it operates through 14 state associations and 178 local and county volunteer associations. It has about 2.38 million members.

The German Youth Hostel Association is a member of the European Movement Germany.

== DJH Membership ==
To stay in a DJH hostel, you must be a member of the German Youth Hotel Association (DJH). Abroad, DJH membership also grants you access to international hostels associated with Hostelling International, with potential discounts. DJH membership is obtained through the state association responsible for each residence, and organizations such as clubs or schools can apply for corporate membership. The fee is annually paid and helps provide access to these benefits.

== History ==
By the late 1920s, Germany had over 2,300 Youth Hostels, but they were basic. These Hostels clearly didn’t compare to today’s standards. Often, they were no more than straw beds in “makeshift shelters” located, for instance, in village schools that were closed for the holidays. Today, the German Youth Hostel Association now operates approximately 438 modern hostels.

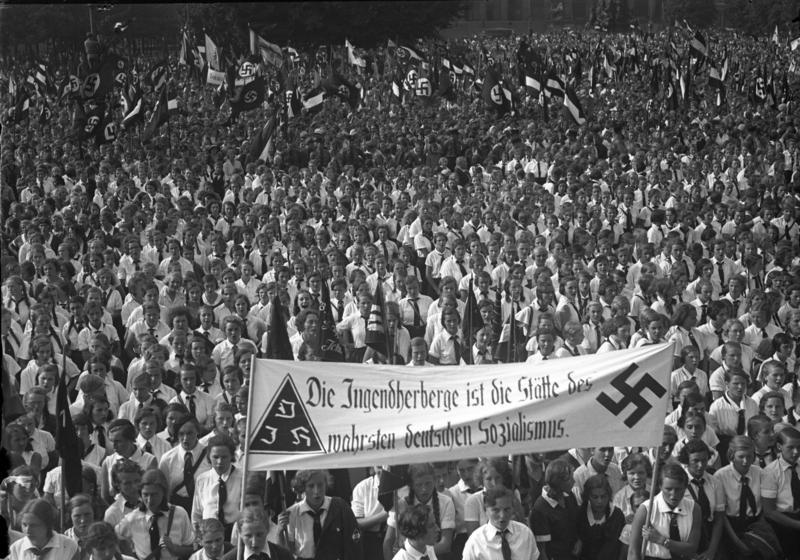
Hitler Youth in Berlin's Lustgarten on 19 August 1933

In 1933, the DJH was merged into the Hitler Youth until the end of the Second World War. In 1949, it was re-founded at Altena Castle in North Rhine-Westphalia.

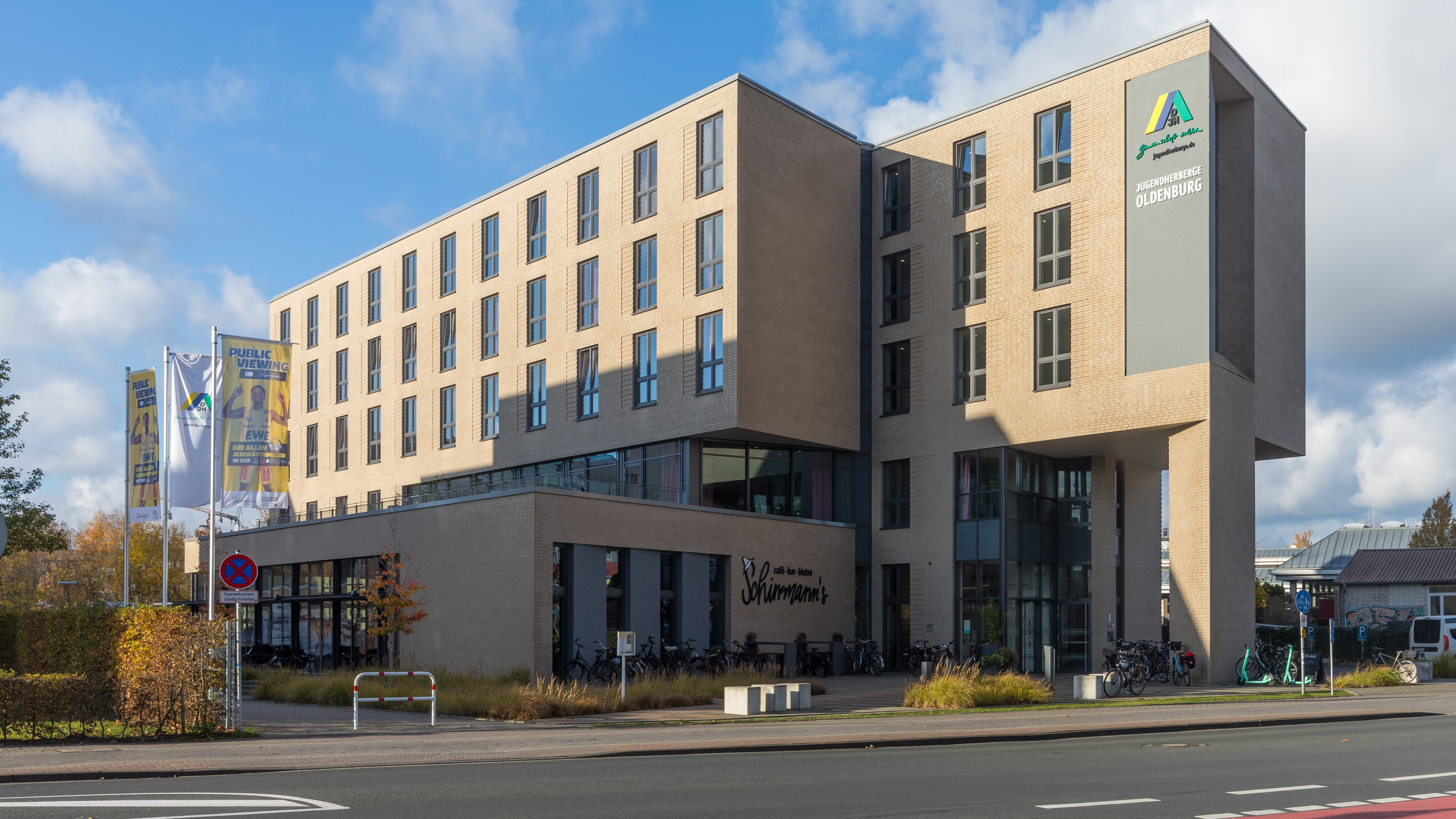
Modern youth hostel in Oldenburg, Lower Saxony

Due to the coronavirus pandemic, the travel restrictions and bans on accommodations caused all DJH Youth Hostels to stop operating in spring 2020. However, a few hostels were allowed to stay open for essential purposes or were temporarily repurposed for special uses such as sheltering the homeless, fever ambulance, women's shelter, e.t.c. In 2019, the DJH, which comprises approximately 450 Youth Hostels in 14 DJH regional associations, recorded about 10 million overnight stays while In 2020, it was only a little more than 3.6 million - a significant decline of 63 percent. The non-profit association was hit particularly hard by the almost complete loss of school trips and other group stays, which were historically the largest guest groups at the DJH. In 2020, the strongest guest groups in the possible travel season were families, many of whom had not previously considered it as holiday destinations.

== Educational programmes ==
Richard Schirrmann’s vision, not only provided affordable accommodation for young travelers who were traveling by foot but also aimed to educate them about the great outdoors they were venturing into and raising awareness for the environment, the vegetation, and wildlife around them. This educational aspect of the hosteling idea is a core value of the Youth Hostel Association, alongside tolerance, international understanding, and open-mindedness.
