= Gronówko, Warmian-Masurian Voivodeship =

Gronówko
- Village
- Location within Poland
- Coordinates: 54°22′1″N 19°58′15″E
- Country: Poland
- Voivodeship: Warmian-Masurian
- County: Braniewo
- Gmina: Braniewo
- Population: 196

Gronówko [ɡrɔˈnufkɔ] (known as Grunenfeld until 1945, under German control) is a village in the administrative district of Gmina Braniewo, within Braniewo County, Warmian-Masurian Voivodeship, in northern Poland, close to the border with the Kaliningrad Oblast of Russia.

== Notable residents ==
- Richard Schirrmann (1874-1961), founder of the first Youth Hostel
