= An Óige =

Irish hostelling organization

- Irish Youth Hostel Association
- Established: 7 May 1931
- Founders: Thekla Beere, Marion Tweedy, C.E. (Terry) Trench
- Founded at: Dublin, Ireland
- Type: Youth organization
- Legal status: Non-profit
- Purpose: To encourage youths to appreciate the Irish countryside through hostelling.
- Headquarters: Dublin, Ireland
- Location(s): Glendalough, Knockree, Errigal and Glenmalure
- Coordinates: 53.356°N 6.268°W
- Region served: Ireland
- Affiliations: Hostelling International
- Website: anoige.ie

An Óige (Irish: [ənˠ ˈoːɟə]; meaning "Youth"), or the Irish Youth Hostel Association (IYHA), is a non-profit organisation providing youth hostel accommodation across Ireland. An Óige is a member of Hostelling International. As of April 2026, it operates four hostels, down from a peak of 55.

== History ==
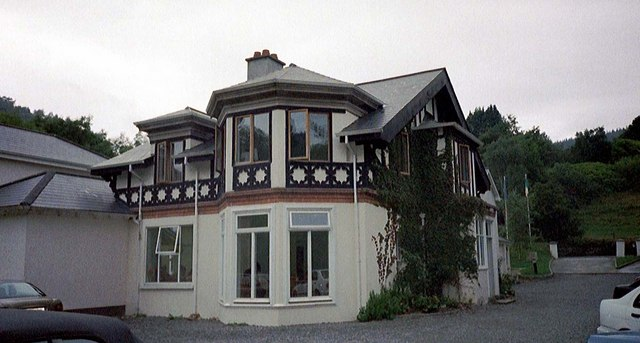
An Óige's hostel in the Glendalough National Park

An Óige was founded on 7 May 1931 by an organising committee which included Thekla Beere, Shane Bodkin, and Chalmers (Terry) Trench. The group had been inspired by the success of the Jugendherbergen in Germany. An Óige's first youth hostel was opened at Lough Dan, near Roundwood, in County Wicklow. An Óige was formed as a membership-based organisation and at its peak had some 15,000 members and ran 55 hostels. It is now a member of Hostelling International.

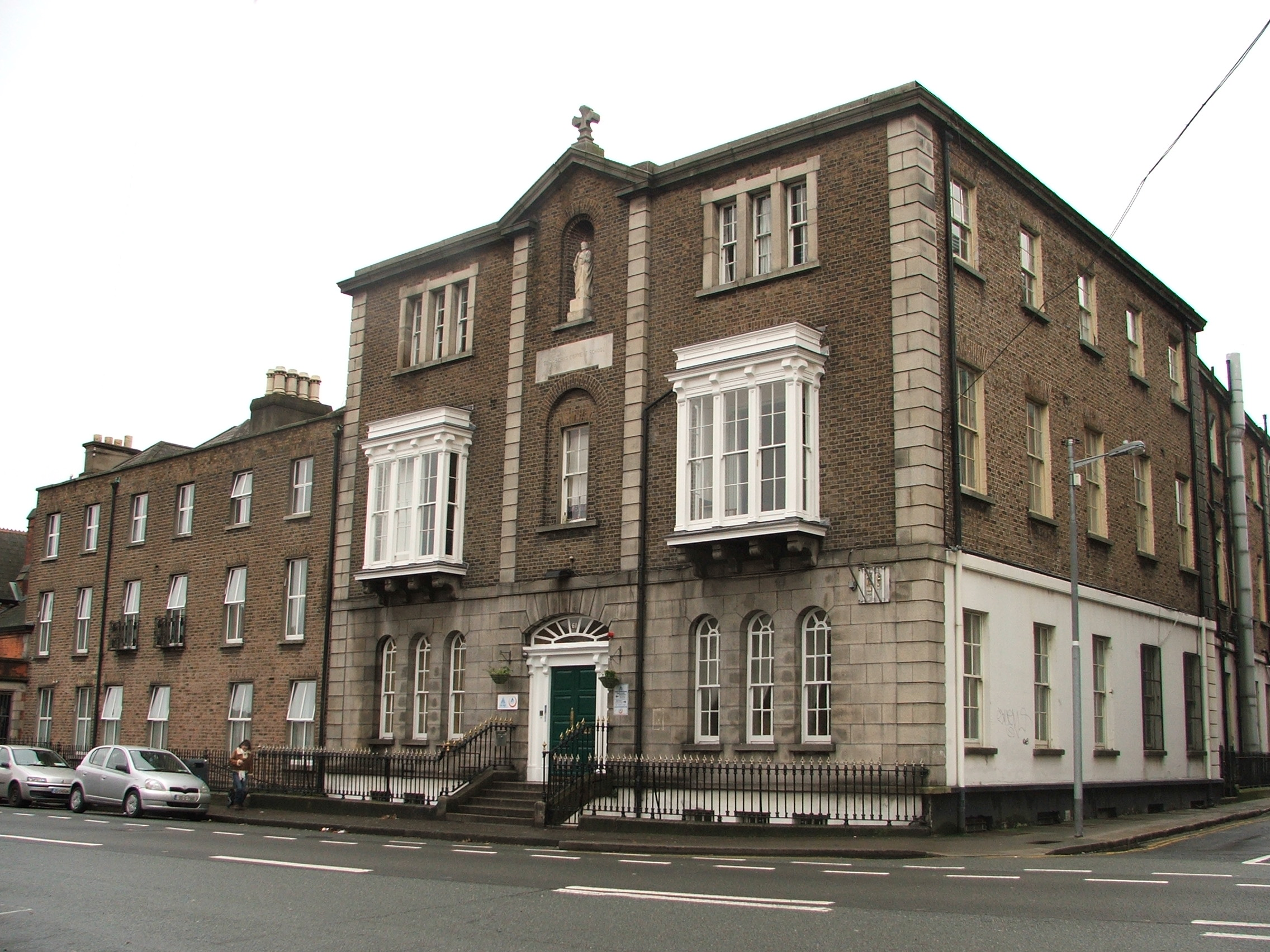
The former headquarters of An Óige, on Mountjoy Street in Dublin

Around the year 1990, the organisation bought the former convent school and orphanage complex at 60-61 Mountjoy Street, built circa 1865, and remodelled it for use as a hostel. This became the main headquarters for An Óige, until its closure and sale in 2019. As of April 2026 it is a private hostel.

The organisation has suffered from financial problems for a long time, with eight hostels being closed down in 2004. They had been running at a loss due to a low level of overnight bookings

In May 2019, An Óige closed the Dublin International Youth Hostel, which was then its main/headquarters facility and reportedly accounted for 60% of its revenue at the time, due to unaffordable repair bills.

In October 2019 the former hostel building on Mountjoy Street was put on the market at a guide price of €5 million. As of August 2022, the site is now in use as a private hostel named Leevin Hostel.

By late 2019, An Óige was running eight of its own hostels, with franchise rights to a further 10. During 2020, all hostels remained closed, as part of the response to the COVID-19 pandemic in Ireland.

== Objectives ==
An Óige, the Irish Youth Hostel Association, has a number of charitable aims. These include to support a "love and appreciation of the countryside" by providing "simple hostel accommodation for [people] whilst on their travels", to foster an appreciation of Irish culture and heritage, to co-operate with Irish organisations which seek to preserve the countryside and walking routes, and to foster associations with similar organisations in other countries.

The organisation is a registered charity in Ireland.
