= YHA Australia =

Australian hostelling organization

YHA Ltd
- Abbreviation: YHA Australia
- Formation: 28 May 2002
- Legal status: Corporation, members' liability limited by guarantee.
- Location: Head office, 11 Rawson Place, Sydney, Australia
- Region served: Australia
- Affiliations: Hostelling International
- Website: YHA Australia

YHA Ltd, trading as YHA Australia, is a not-for-profit of members trading corporation providing hostel and other accommodation, travel and associated service in Australia. It is a member organisation of Hostelling International.

YHA Ltd became a management and director controlled corporation with managers and directors now controlling the selection of successive directors and directors being able to appoint a least one-third of their number without election Directors may profit from payments but ordinary members are not entitled to a share of profits or assets. Profits are not necessarily spent or re-invested in the network of hostels or the provision of accommodation and services to members.

The founder of the youth hostel movement, Richard Schirrmann, took youths away from the conditions of factories and cities to experience the countryside on foot and by bicycle and, in winter, on skis and skates, finding accommodation in barns, houses, school buildings and later designated hostels in the countryside. In the 1960s, YHA NSW recognised eight principles including "2) Every encouragement should be given to those who travel by their own effort whether they travel by foot, bicycle, canoe, horse or row or sail", "3) Hostellers should be encouraged to enjoy the bush" and "4) Rural industries ... could be visited".

In recent decades, the Australian organisation changed focus and closed many hostels in rural areas and concentrated on providing travel accommodation in major tourist destinations, particularly large accommodation in metropolitan areas and coastal cities and towns where accommodation was already readily supplied. While still using the name YHA (Youth Hostels Association), the organisation no longer has a focus on providing accommodation for youths and now provides accommodation regardless of age. At the same time, the types of accommodation provided has changed from hostel to include hotel-style rooms and suites and self-contained accommodation. Having accumulated large debts on city and prime tourist location properties, as a result of the COVID-19 pandemic decline in travel revenue, the organisation was forced to sell more hostels, many well below their account book value, with nineteen hostels closed.

== History ==
For the history of Youth Hostelling as a movement distinct from YHA Ltd see Origins of youth hostelling.

Youth hostels were established in Australia long before and independent of the YHA organisation. The earliest youth hostels were established in the 1920s and, in 1933, Joan Anderson opened a youth hostel called The Hermitage at Narbethong, Victoria. In 1938, a meeting of 300 people in Upwey, Victoria passed a resolution supporting "establishing ... youth hostels" but not a YHA organisation. By 1940, there were "various enterprises adopting the name youth hostels for their accommodation." In 1940, the Government of New South Wales National Fitness Council established a Youth Hostel Planning Committee and subsequently operated youth hostels which were made available to the YHA NSW organisation after it was formed in 1942. In Tasmania, at least as early as 1944, a Camps and Hostels Committee operated to establish campsites and hostels, before the formation of the YHA Tasmania organisation in 1951. The South Australian National Fitness Council also established a youth hostel committee and the Western Australia National Fitness Council established a camps and hostels committee and commissioned a report by the University of Western Australia geographer (and former wartime internee), Dr. Joseph Gentilli, on the potential of youth hostels which included mapping and recording existing camps and hostels. The Queensland National Fitness Council expended funds to establish camps and youth hostels and made its facilities available for hostellers before the formation of the YHA Queensland organisation. In 1946, the YHA Victoria organisation challenged the Government of Victoria National Fitness Council over funds allocated for the establishment of camps and youth hostels but it was explained that the YHA organisation was not the only organisation entitled to the funding as "other organisations had taken to running ... youth hostels".

YHA Ltd was registered on 28 May 2002 under the name, YHA NSW Ltd. The organisation succeeded YHA NSW Inc., formerly named the Youth Hostels Association of New South Wales Inc. which had succeeded the unincorporated Youth Hostels Association of New South Wales which had been formed in 1943.

The first Youth Hostel Association formed in Australia was YHA Victoria, stemming from a inaugural public meeting in Melbourne town hall on 4 September 1939, follow-up meetings of an organising council, a conference on 18-19 May 1940 and eventually the constitution of an association on 30 September 1940. This was followed by YHA New South Wales (7 April 1943) formed under the auspices of the New South Wales National Fitness Council, YHA South Australia (1949), YHA Tasmania (1951), YHA Western Australia (1951), YHA Queensland (1962) and YHA Northern Territory (1976).

In 1947, YHA Victoria and YHA NSW and supporters from other states formed the Australian YHA as a federated body to co-ordinate the state-based YHA organisations and allow the YHA organisation in Australia to be represented in the International Youth Hostelling Federation (now Hostelling International). The Australian YHA could only make recommendations to the state-based YHA organisations and was not formally constituted until 1968.

Between 2007 and 2017, the state and territory-based YHA organisations outside New South Wales and the operations of the Australian YHA merged into YHA Ltd with some becoming controlled subsidiaries or charitable trusts.

=== Logo ===
In June 2022, the organisation registered a new trademark. The original YHA 'house and tree' symbol originated from the first Youth Hostelling signs in Europe in 1934. The tree and house represented the outdoor environment and shelter and the open door symbolised a welcome to travellers.

=== Awards ===
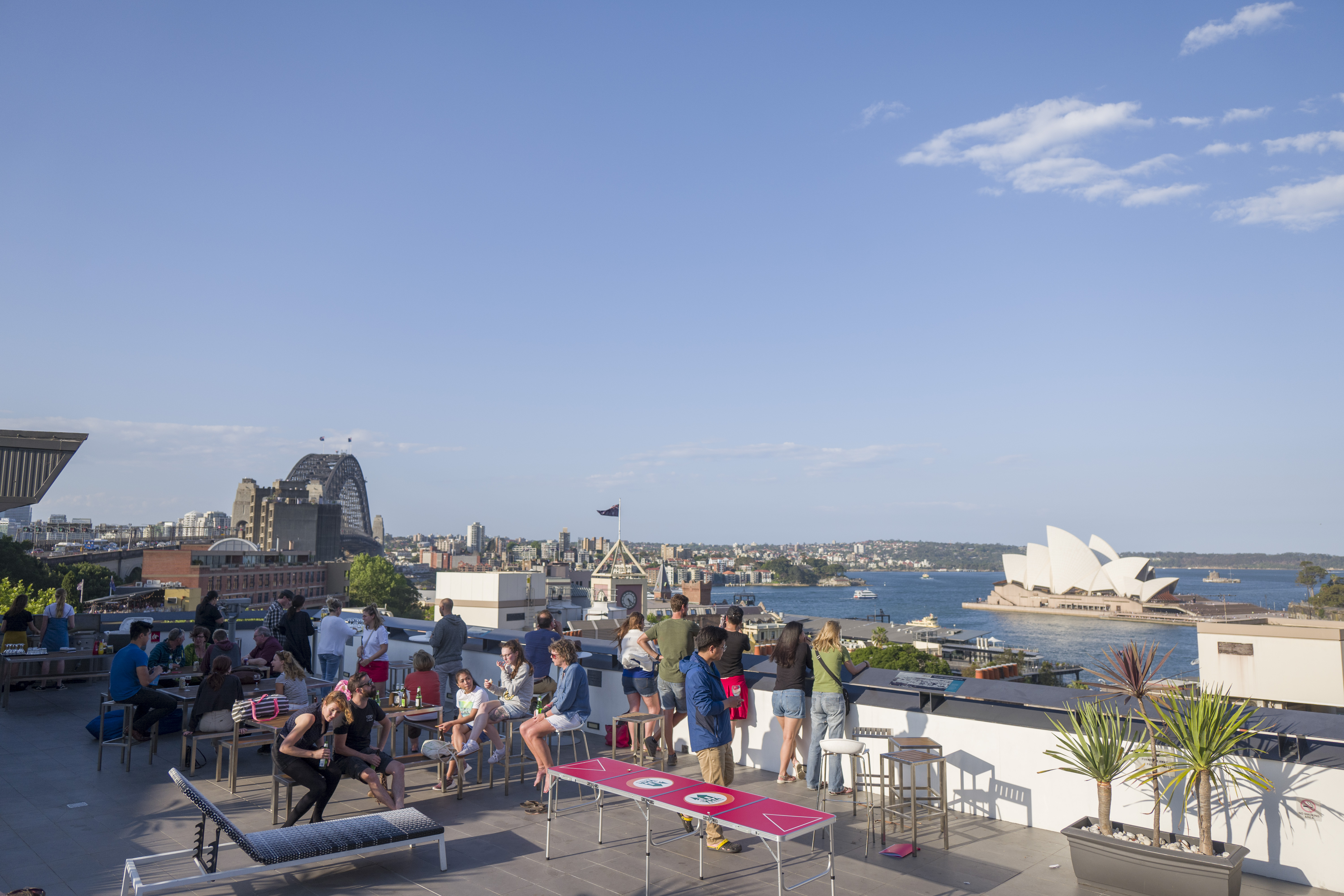
Sydney Harbour YHA's views of the Harbour and Sydney Opera House

In 2019, the Grampians Eco YHA was the winner of 'Best Accommodation in Australia' and 'Best Accommodation in Victoria' at the Adventure Tourism Awards. Sydney Harbour YHA also won 'Best Accommodation in NSW' for 2019, along with Hobart Central YHA for 'Best Accommodation in Tasmania'.

In 2018, the winner of the 'Best Accommodation in Australia' award at this event was Noosa YHA, which also won the award for 'Best Accommodation in Queensland.' The following won in their respective States: Melbourne Central YHA (Victoria); Fremantle Prison YHA (WA) and Adelaide Central YHA (SA). In previous years, many other awards have also been bestowed on YHA properties, including Sydney Central YHA and Sydney Harbour YHA winning the 'Best Backpacker Accommodation' Award at the Australian Tourism Awards. Adelaide Central YHA has won 'Best Backpacker Accommodation' in South Australia; Alice Springs YHA has won 'Best Backpacker Accommodation' in the Northern Territory; Brisbane City YHA and Cairns Central YHA 'Best Backpacker Accommodation' in Queensland; Melbourne Metro YHA 'Best Backpacker Accommodation' in Victoria; Perth City YHA 'Best Backpacker Accommodation' in Western Australia, and Thredbo YHA 'Best Backpacker Accommodation' in the Canberra & Capital Region awards.

== Heritage hostels ==
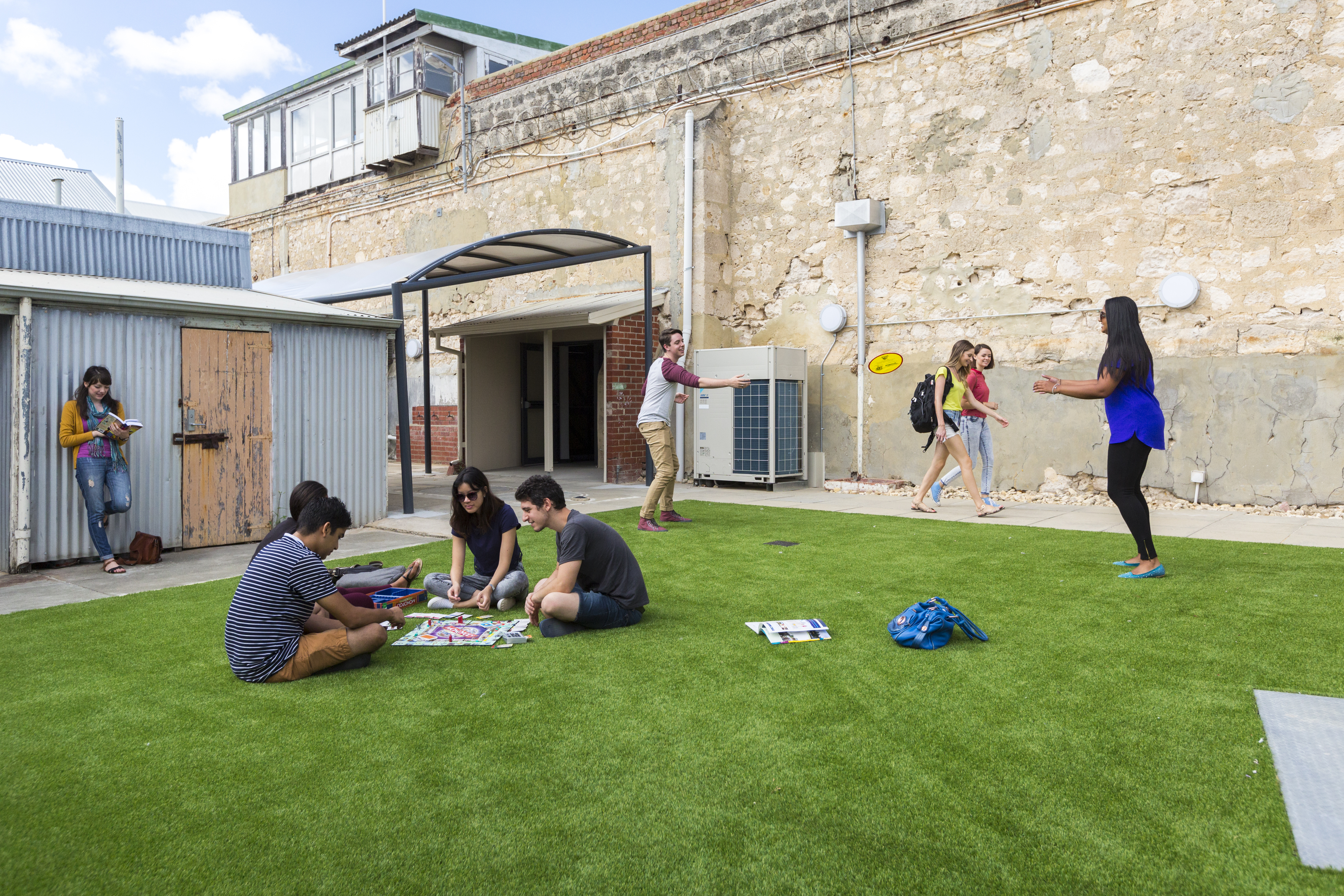
Fremantle Prison YHA is located in the women's wing of a historic 19th Century prison.

Fremantle Prison YHA is located in the World Heritage listed 19th century former prison's women's wing. Railway Square YHA (closed) is situated on the disused 'Platform Zero' of Sydney's Central Station, with replica rail carriages providing multi-share rooms and the old parcels sorting shed re-purposed into the hostel's main building. Newcastle Beach YHA is a converted 'gentleman's club' founded in 1885, and Blue Mountains YHA, Katoomba is a well preserved art deco building that used to be the home of the Wentworth Cabaret, featuring the oldest sprung timber dance floor in the Southern Hemisphere.

== Sustainability ==
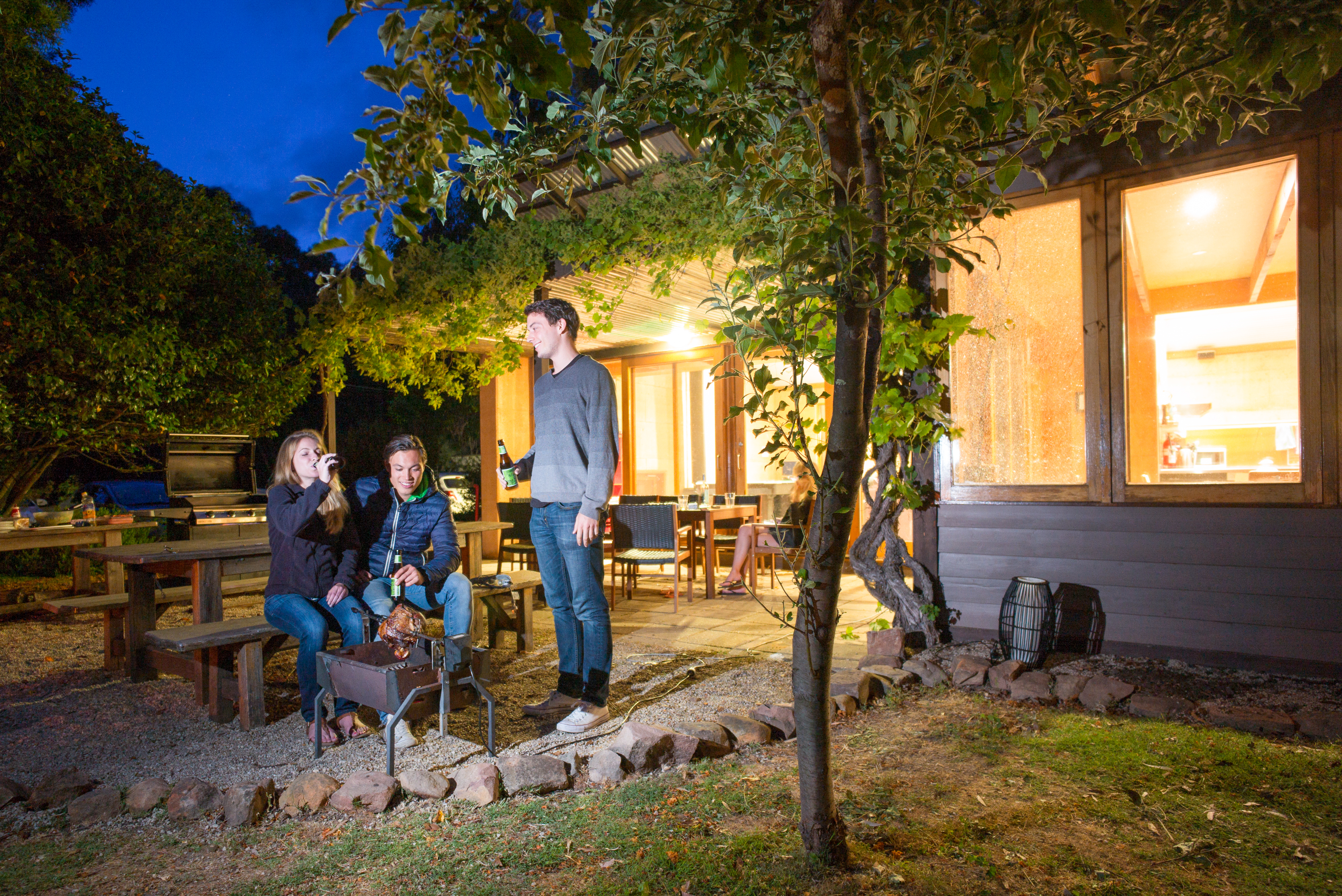
The custom-built Grampians Eco YHA, located in Halls Gap on the doorstep of the Grampians National Park in western Victoria.

YHA Ltd has stated commitment to reducing its impact on the environment and raising awareness of the benefits of low-impact travel. YHA Ltd's Sustainable Hostels Fund, which encourages guests to donate $1 when they book a stay which YHA Ltd then matches, has helped install solar hot water systems at Adelaide Central, Perth City (sold), Byron Bay, Cairns Central, Glebe Point (sold 2020), Pittwater, Hawkesbury Heights (sold 2020), Grampians Eco Lodge and Melbourne Metro, as well as solar power in Alice Springs, which generates as much as half of that hostel's energy needs. The 145 solar cells installed on Perth City's rooftop in 2014 saves more than 42 tonnes of carbon emissions a year.

YHA-owned hostels stopped selling disposable water bottles in 2014, instead encouraging guests to purchase refillable bottles at reception. Some YHA hostels feature rainwater tanks, on-site vegetable gardens and composters, bike rental, swap shelves, low-energy lightbulbs/LEDs, and water-saving bathroom devices to promote sustainable travel.
