= Connie Alexander (youth hostelling) =

English pioneer of UK youth hostelling

- Connie with her dog Yo-Ho
- Born: Edith Constance Alexander; 27 November 1897; Bradford, West Riding of Yorkshire, England
- Died: 9 November 1979 (aged 81); Llandudno Junction, Gwynedd, Wales
- Years active: 1929–1939
- Known for: youth hostel pioneer

Edith Constance Alexander (27 November 1897 – 9 November 1979) was a pioneer of youth hostelling in the United Kingdom. She was a founder member of the Youth Hostels Association in the UK and their first warden.

== Life ==
Connie, as she was known, was born in Bradford, West Riding of Yorkshire in 1897 but by her teenage years was living in Liverpool. An active member of the Liverpool Ramblers Federation and Holiday Fellowship, she was also involved with the League of Welldoers. (Note: The League of Welldoers was established in 1893 to provide meals to starving children.) In 1929 Connie was one of seven members of the Holiday Fellowship who went on a fact-finding expedition to Germany to investigate the work of the German Youth Hostel Association. From that trip, came the interest to found a youth hostelling movement in Britain. During 1930 the Merseyside group of the newly formed Youth Hostels Association (England & Wales) (YHA) looked for premises to use as hostels and in time for Christmas 1930 the group opened Britain's first youth hostel at Pennant Hall near Llanrwst in north Wales. Alexander was part of the advance party of four who set up the hostel, where Connie was appointed cook and generally in charge of affairs. Although Pennant Hall closed shortly into 1931 due to issues with the water supply, Connie Alexander is considered the first YHA warden.

The following year YHA opened Idwal Cottage youth hostel in the Ogwen Valley and Alexander was appointed as the warden, taking up her duties in May 1931. A keen climber, Alexander, spent much of her spare time in the mountains around the hostel and was involved in several rescues of people lost or injured in the area. On more than one occasion she gave evidence at inquests following fatal incidents.

In March 1937 she was the subject of a large scale search after she failed to return from a walk when a storm came on. Over 30 people were involved with the search which took place overnight and into the next day before Alexander was reported safe at a hotel in Llanberis, having found her way in the storm to the road and being given a lift by a passing motorist into Llanberis. Alexander recounted the incident in the first episode of the series, It Might Happen To You on the BBC Regional Programme broadcast on 11 October 1937.

Alexander remained warden at Idwal Cottage until July 1940 when she left to marry a local climber, Richard Williams. After their marriage the couple settled in the area eventually residing in Llandudno where they remained until Alexander's death in 1979.
