= Thekla Beere =

Irish civil servant (1902–1991)

Thekla Beere (1902 – 19 February 1991) was an Irish civil servant who chaired the Ireland's Commission on the Status of Women in 1970 and was secretary of the Department of Transport and Power. She was the first woman to lead a government department in Ireland.

== Early life ==
Thekla Beere was born at Streete, County Westmeath, where her father, the Rev. Francis Beere, was the Church of Ireland rector. She attended Alexandra College, Dublin and did a moderatorship in Legal and Political Sciences and an LL.B. at Trinity College Dublin.

== Career ==
She joined the Civil Service in 1924 and worked initially in the Statistics Branch. In 1925, she won a Rockefeller scholarship and traveled extensively in the United States before resuming her Civil Service career. From 1939, she worked in the Department of Industry and Commerce where during The Emergency (as World War II was known in Ireland), she worked in the area of supply with the then Minister Seán Lemass. She became Assistant Secretary of that department in 1953. She was the first woman to achieve the rank of Department Secretary, the highest ranking post in a government department, doing so at the Department of Transport and Power in 1959. President Mary McAleese called her the "ultimate civil servant".

Trinity College conferred an honorary doctorate of Doctor of Laws upon her in 1960. After her retirement in 1967 she was active in public life, serving as a governor of Alexandra College and as a director of The Irish Times. She was requested by the Government to chair the Commission on the Status of Women in 1970 and the Beere Report was presented to the Minister for Finance in December 1972. The report provided a model for change in equal pay, the Civil Service marriage bar (Which required female civil servants to resign from their position upon marriage) and the widow's pension.

== Personal life ==
Beere had a lifelong interest in the proceedings of the Statistical and Social Inquiry Society of Ireland and was its president. She was a Governor of the Irish Times Trust and chairwoman of the International Labour Office in Geneva. She was a member of the organising committee, which on 7 May 1931 set up An Óige (The Irish Youth Hostelling organisation), of which she was president from 1968 to 1974. She also had an extensive interest in the arts, in particular the paintings of Cecil King. Ms Beere never married, but had a 40-year long companionship with businessman JJ O’Leary.

== Recognition ==
In 2023, Beere was featured on one of four stamps issued by An Post marking International Women's Day and celebrating the outstanding contribution of Women in Public Life.
