= Hostelling International =

Federation of national youth hostel associations

- Abbreviation: HI
- Formation: 1932
- Legal status: Charity
- Purpose: Accommodation for backpackers across the world
- Location: Bell Yard, London, UK
- Region served: Global
- Members: Youth Hostel members
- Affiliations: YHA; SYHA; YHA Australia; HI USA; HINI; HI – Canada; IYHA
- Website: hihostels.com

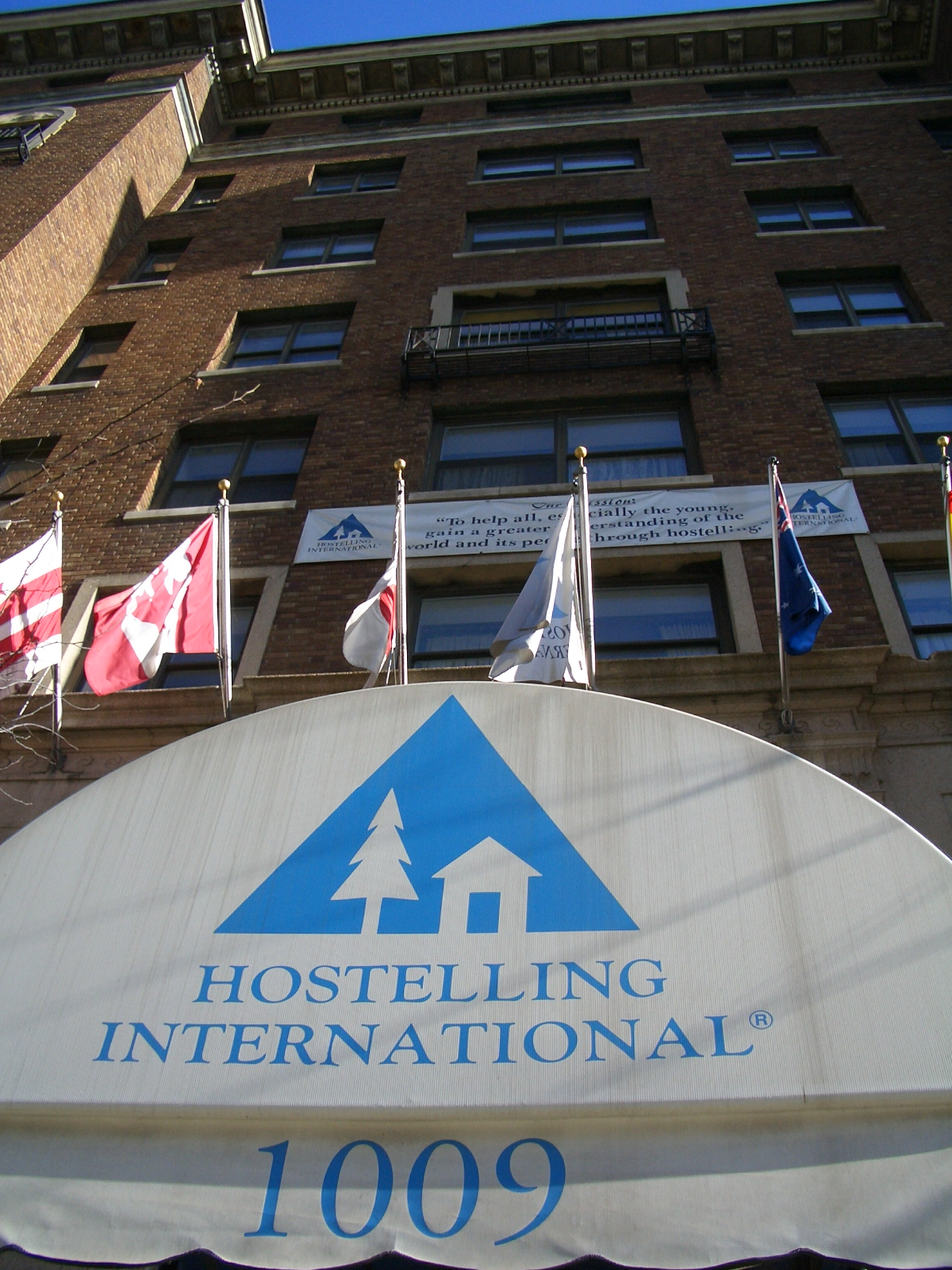
Hostelling Int'l, Washington D.C.

Hostelling International (HI) is a non-governmental, not-for-profit organisation working with UNESCO and the World Tourism Organisation UNWTO. Formerly known as the International Youth Hostel Federation, Hostelling International has 60 member associations operating over 2,650 hostels around the world.

== Origins of the International Youth Hostel Federation ==
Richard Schirrmann, a German schoolteacher, opened the first youth hostel on 1 June 1912 in Altena Castle, in northwest Germany, with the goal of providing affordable accommodation to youth travelling the country. More hostels were opened in Germany throughout the 1910s, and Schirrmann founded the German Youth Hostel Association in 1919.

Other countries in Europe adopted this concept, which led to the founding of the International Youth Hostel Federation (IYHF) in October 1932 in Amsterdam by representatives from Switzerland, Czechoslovakia, Germany, Poland, Netherlands, Norway, Denmark, Britain, Ireland, France, and Belgium. Schirrmann, who became president in 1933, resigned in 1936 when the Government of Nazi Germany forced him out while the hostels were put under control of the Hitler Youth.

Throughout the 1950s, the hostel concept spread to Asia, Africa, and Latin America. By 1977, the international hostel network had reached a total of 500 million overnight stays, and by 1997, it counted one billion stays.

IYHF began using the name Hostelling International in 2006.

Youth hostels originally differed in setup from modern hostels, although the growing popularity of backpacking culture forced them to evolve. For example, in England and Wales, the practice of visitors completing daily chores and cleaning tasks as part of their stay was phased out during the 1980s.

== Modern organization ==
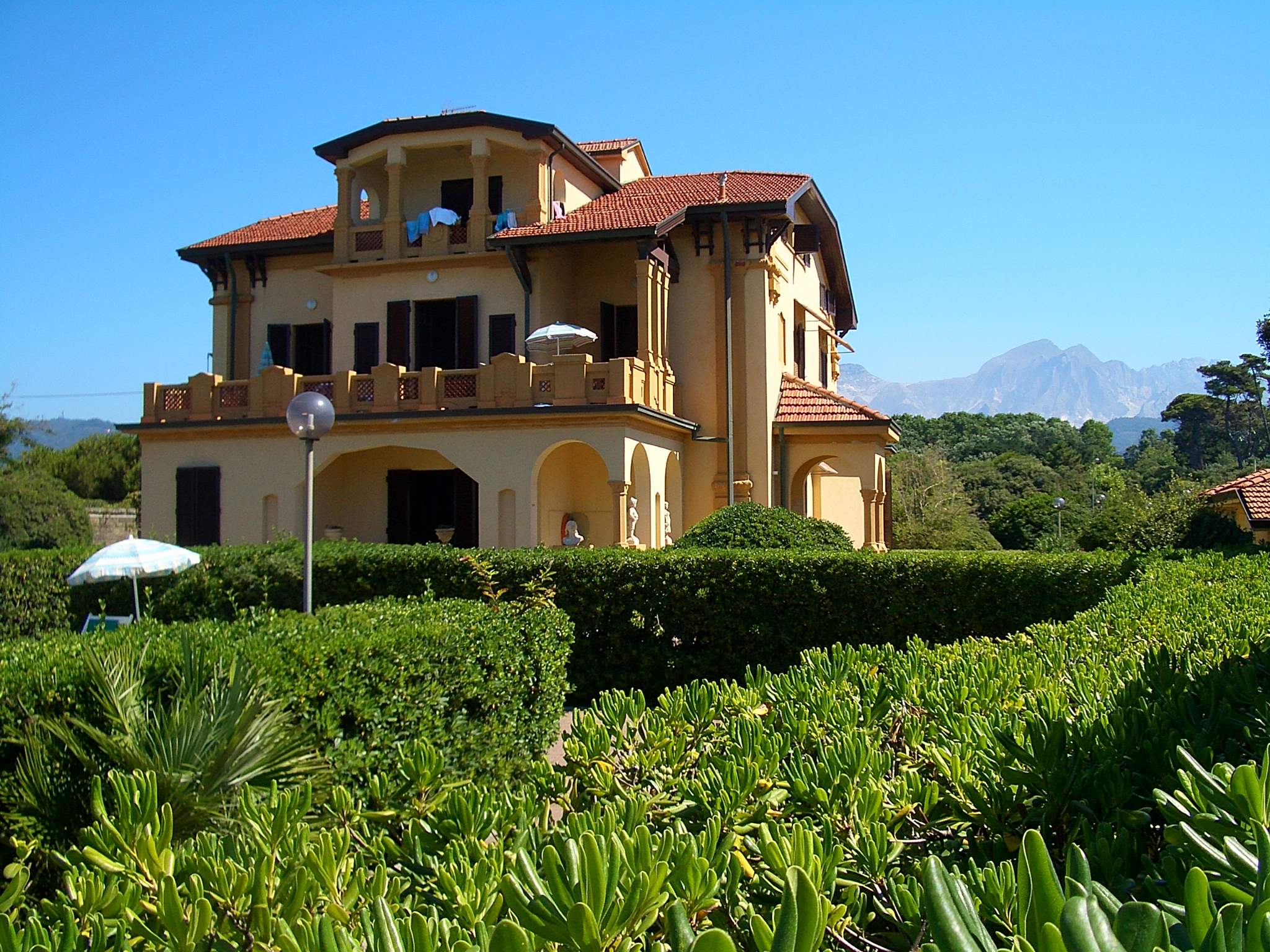
HI hostel in Marina di Massa, Tuscany, Italy

When Hostelling International was founded, representatives agreed on the introduction of an international membership card and established minimum standards for hostels. Memberships are still required today and can be purchased either online, at a hostel, or at a National Youth Hostel Association office or membership-selling outlet.

HI reports 37 million overnight stays annually, according to the United Nations World Tourism Organization. 60 National Youth Hostel Associations are members of HI, with over 2,650 hostels worldwide.

Although HI holds charity status in the UK, not all member organizations share this status. For example, Hostelling International Canada lost its charity status in 2008, and the YHA in England and Wales considered commercializing in response to increased competition from independent hostels.

The COVID-19 pandemic (2019–2023) led some national associations, such as the Youth Hostel Association of New Zealand, to sell off properties due to financial impacts.

== See also ==
- Category: Hostelling International member associations – pages for individual member associations of HI
