= Altena =

- Town
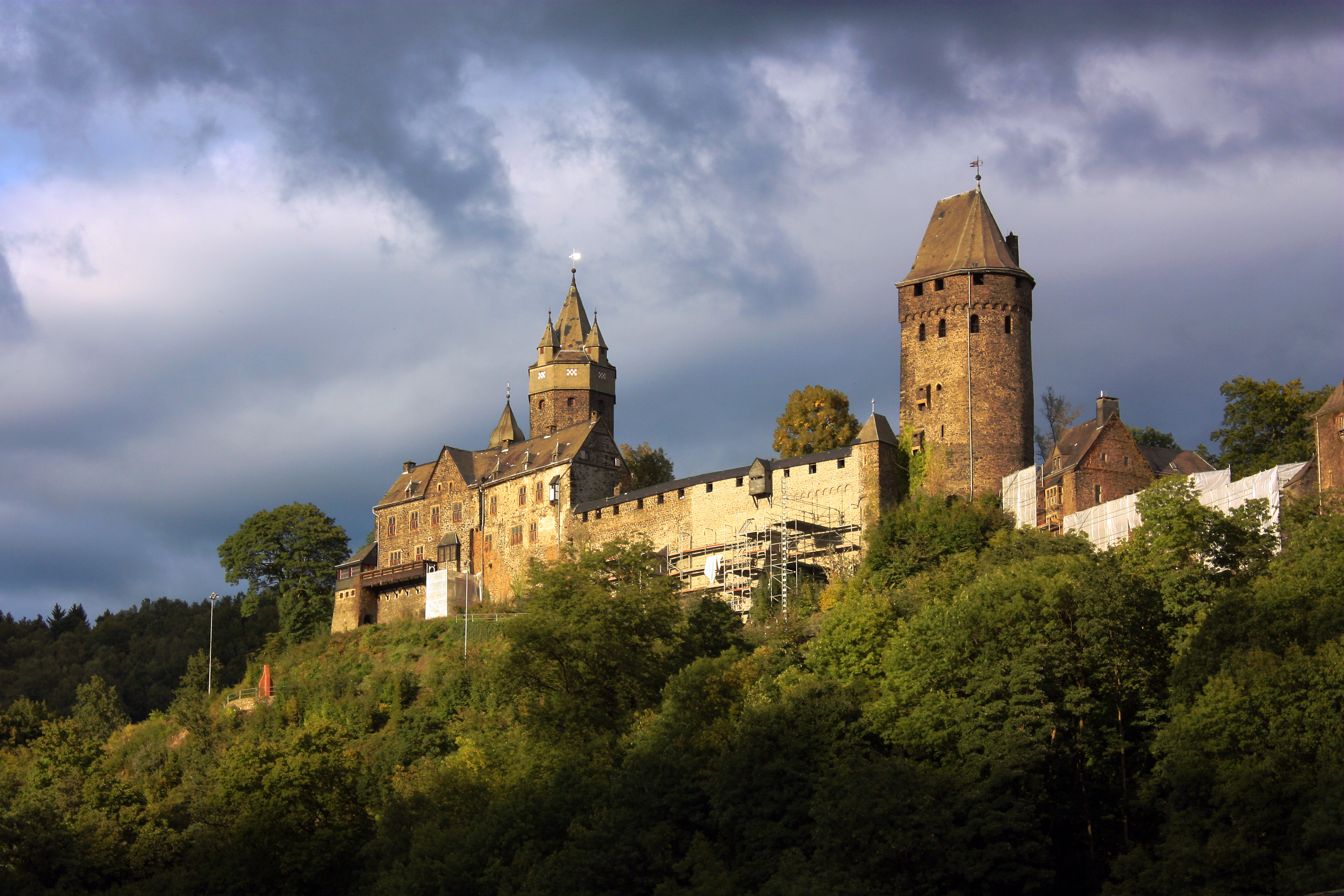
- View of Altena Castle in September 2008

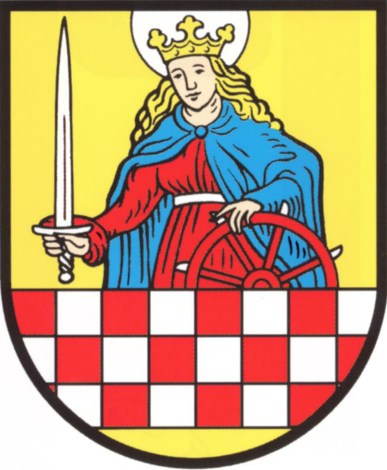
- Coat of arms

- Location of Altena within Märkischer Kreis district
- Interactive map of Altena
- Location within Germany Location within North Rhine-Westphalia
- Coordinates: 51°18′N 07°40′E
- Country: Germany
- State: North Rhine-Westphalia
- Admin. region: Arnsberg
- District: Märkischer Kreis
- Subdivisions: 7

Government
  - Mayor (2025–30): Guido Thal (CDU)

Area
  - Total: 44.42 km^{2} (17.15 sq mi)
- Elevation: 145–511 m (476–1,677 ft)

Population (2025-12-31)
  - Total: 16,403
  - Density: 369.3/km^{2} (956.4/sq mi)
- Time zone: UTC+01:00 (CET)
  - Summer (DST): UTC+02:00 (CEST)
- Postal codes: 58741–58762
- Dialling codes: 02352
- Vehicle registration: MK
- Website: www.altena.de

Altena (German pronunciation: [ˈaltəna]; Westphalian: Altenoa) is a town in the district of Märkischer Kreis, North Rhine-Westphalia, Germany. The town's castle is the origin for the later Dukes of Berg. Altena is situated on the Lenne river valley, in the northern stretches of the Sauerland.

== History ==
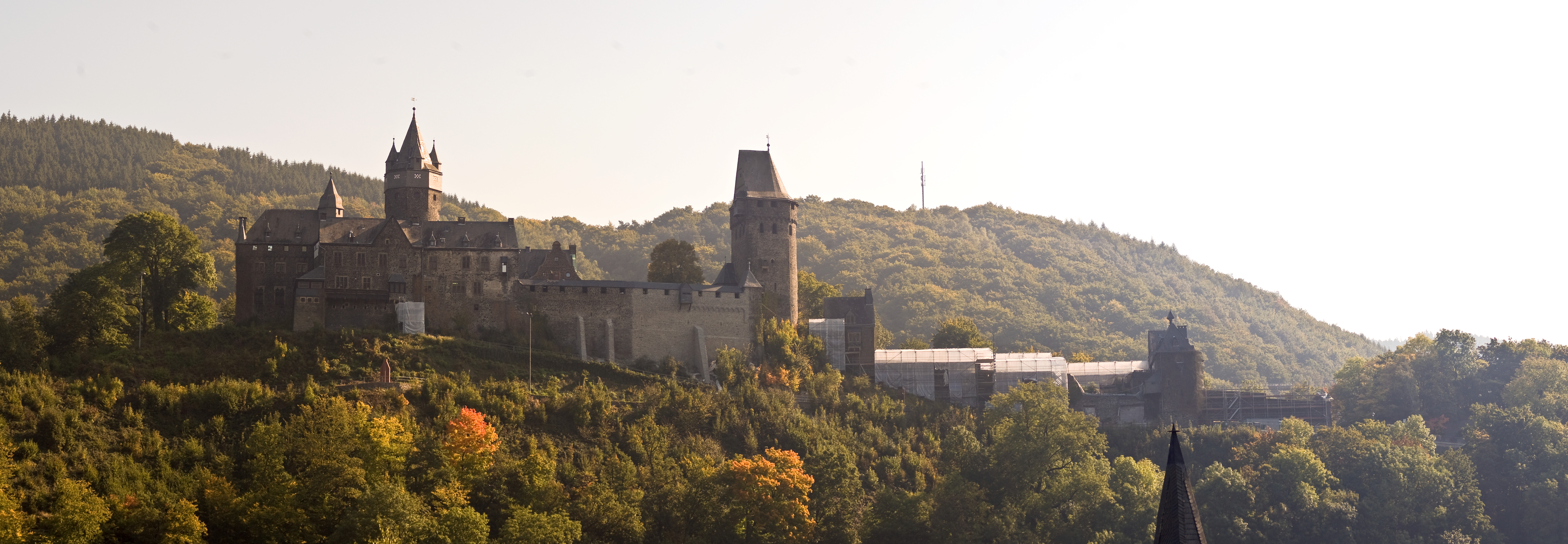
Altena Castle

Altena Castle was built in the early 12th century, as a stronghold of the older Counts of Berg. A short time later a village was founded beneath the hill, with the castle alongside the river Lenne, which feeds into the river Ruhr. After the distribution of the Berg family estates in 1161, Altena became the centre of the County of Altena. The first Count of Altena became Eberhard I, Count of Berg-Altena. In 1180, after the death of the first count, the county was divided between the two oldest sons: Arnold of Altena and Friedrich of Altena. The third son, Adolf of Altena, became Archbishop of Cologne. Arnold was provided with on half of the Castle and County of Altena, the Castle Hövel and some estates as fiefdoms of the Archbishops of Cologne and bailiwicks of the Abbey Essen. Near the Village and Castle of Hövel, he built the Castle and town of Nienbrügge (Novus Ponte) on the Lippe riverbanks. His family branch renamed themselves after selling their half of Altena to the Archbishop of Cologne as de Nienbrügge or de Novus Ponte, their new principal residence about forty kilometers to the north. The heir of Arnold was Friedrich de Novus Ponte (Nienbrügge) who changed his title to Isenberg after his new castle in Hattingen. He was sentenced to death as head of a conspiracy to murder Engelbert I. Archbishop of Cologne, Chancellor of the Holy Roman Empire, Duke of Westphalia and Count of Berg, a close relative, in 1226. The Archbishop was ambushed and slain on his way from his City of Soest to City of Cologne by Friedrich and his men near Gevelsberg in a hollow way. Both had a dispute over the bailiwicks of Essen Abbey.

The junior branch of the Counts of Altena, was founded by Friedrich de Altena. He was provided with the other half of Altena and a vassal to his brother the Archbishop of Cologne. In or around 1170 he bought the Oberhof Mark or was rewarded with it by the Archbishop. The Oberhof was a mayor manor without fortifications in the village of Mark, between the Lippe and Ahse rivers less than five kilometers to the east of the Nienbrügge Castle and about seven kilometers southeast of Hövel Castle. Today, about a 1,5 kilometers to the east of the centre of the city of Hamm. Before or in 1198 he built the Castle of Mark. His son Adolf I. named himself in 1202 puer comes de marca and became the first Count of Mark. He sometimes used the old title Altena in combination with Mark. His principal residence was the Castle of Mark. After the execution of his cousin Friedrich de Isenberg in Cologne, he destroyed the Castle of Neinbruegge and took over the possessions of the senior family branch.

After 1202, Altena Castle was only one of several Stronghold of the family of Altena-Mark. During a feud in 1323 between the Prince-Bishop of Münster and the Count of Mark, the Bishop was captured and held for ransom in Altena. In 1367 the settlement below the castle received limited town rights through Engelbert III. Count de la Mark. Since 1392 Altena remained only the seat of the bailiff for bailiwick Altena. The castle was also used as an archive for documents and patents for the county.

In 1609, the last count died childless. His realm, the United Duchies of Jülich-Cleves-Berg were practically divided into a Catholic and a Protestant part. The Duchy of Cleves and the counties of Mark and Ravensberg, and the Dominion of Ravenstein were inherited by the Protestant Elector of the Holy Roman Empire, Margrave of Brandenburg, and Duke of Prussia Johann Sigismund of Hohenzollern. The catholic Duchy of Jülich-Berg were inherited by the Count Palatine Wolfgang Wilhelm of Neuburg.

During the Napoleonic occupation of the Rhineland and Westphalia, Altena was re-joined with the now elevated Grand Duchy of Berg. After the Congress of Vienna the County of Mark was incorporated into the Kingdom of Prussia and reorganized as a district (Kreis) and government district (Regierungsbezirk). Altena became part of the Regierungsbezirk Hamm and was seat of the Kreis Altena. Within the year 1815 the Government moved the quarters from Hamm to Arnsberg, and changed the name into Regierungsbezirk Arnsberg.

With the start of the year 1969, the Kreis Altena and the town Lüdenscheid were merged to form the new Kreis Lüdenscheid. Lüdenscheid became the new administrative center of the district. Only six years later the Kreis Lüdenscheid was reformed and enlarged. In reminiscence of the County of Mark it was renamed as Märkischer Kreis.

In May 2017, Chancellor Merkel awarded Altena Mayor Andreas Hollstein the "National Prize for Integration" for taking in 370 refugees, i.e. 100 more than the mandatory quota. Six months later, even though Mayor Hollstein had been stabbed by a man with a knife who reportedly was upset over his immigration policy, he remained determined to promote policies aimed at helping refugees assimilate into the town.

== Politics ==
The current mayor is Guido Thal of the CDU. During the 2025 local elections he received 63,1 % of the vote.

=== City Council ===
After the 2025 elections, the Altena city council is composed as follows:

Party	Votes	%	+/-	Seats	+/-
Christian Democratic Union (CDU)	3,161	50.5	▲4.5	17	▲2
Social Democratic Party (SPD)	1,535	24.5	▲3.2	8	▲1
Alliance 90/The Greens (Grüne)	709	11.3	▼6.3	3	▼3
Social and Democratic Alternative Altena (SDA)	556	8.9	▲2.9	3	▲1
The Left (Die Linke)	304	4.9	▲0.3	1	±0
Valid votes	6,265	96.0			
Invalid votes	258	4.0			
Total	6,523	100.0		32	±0
Electorate/voter turnout	13,395	48.7			
Source: City of Altena

=== Mayors ===
- April 1945 – August 1945 Fritz Berg
- August 1945 – March 1946 Friedrich Heyne
- September 1946 – November 1952 Hermann Voß
- November 1952 – October 1956 Gustav Trappe
- November 1956 – January 1957 Hermann Voß
- January 1957 – March 1961 Heinrich Malkus
- March 1961 – March 1969 Gustav Trappe
- April 1969 – April 1970 Friedhelm Halfmeier (SPD)
- April 1970 – September 1999 Günter Topmann (SPD)
- September 1999 - Oktober 2020 Andreas Hollstein (CDU)
- November 2020 – November 2025 Uwe Kober (CDU)
- since November 2025 Guido Thal (CDU)

== Population development ==
Historical population

Year	Pop.	±% p.a.
1900	12,766	—
1930	16,415	+0.84%
1945	19,937	+1.30%
1960	23,914	+1.22%
1965	32,333	+6.22%
1970	30,137	−1.40%
1975	26,750	−2.36%
1980	24,565	−1.69%
1985	22,207	−2.00%

Year	Pop.	±% p.a.
1990	24,053	+1.61%
1995	24,026	−0.02%
2000	22,215	−1.56%
2005	20,444	−1.65%
2010	18,277	−2.22%
2015	17,375	−1.01%
2020	16,527	−1.00%
2025	16,403	−0.15%

Source: Landesdatabank Nordrhein-Westfalen (1965-2025)

== Points of interest ==
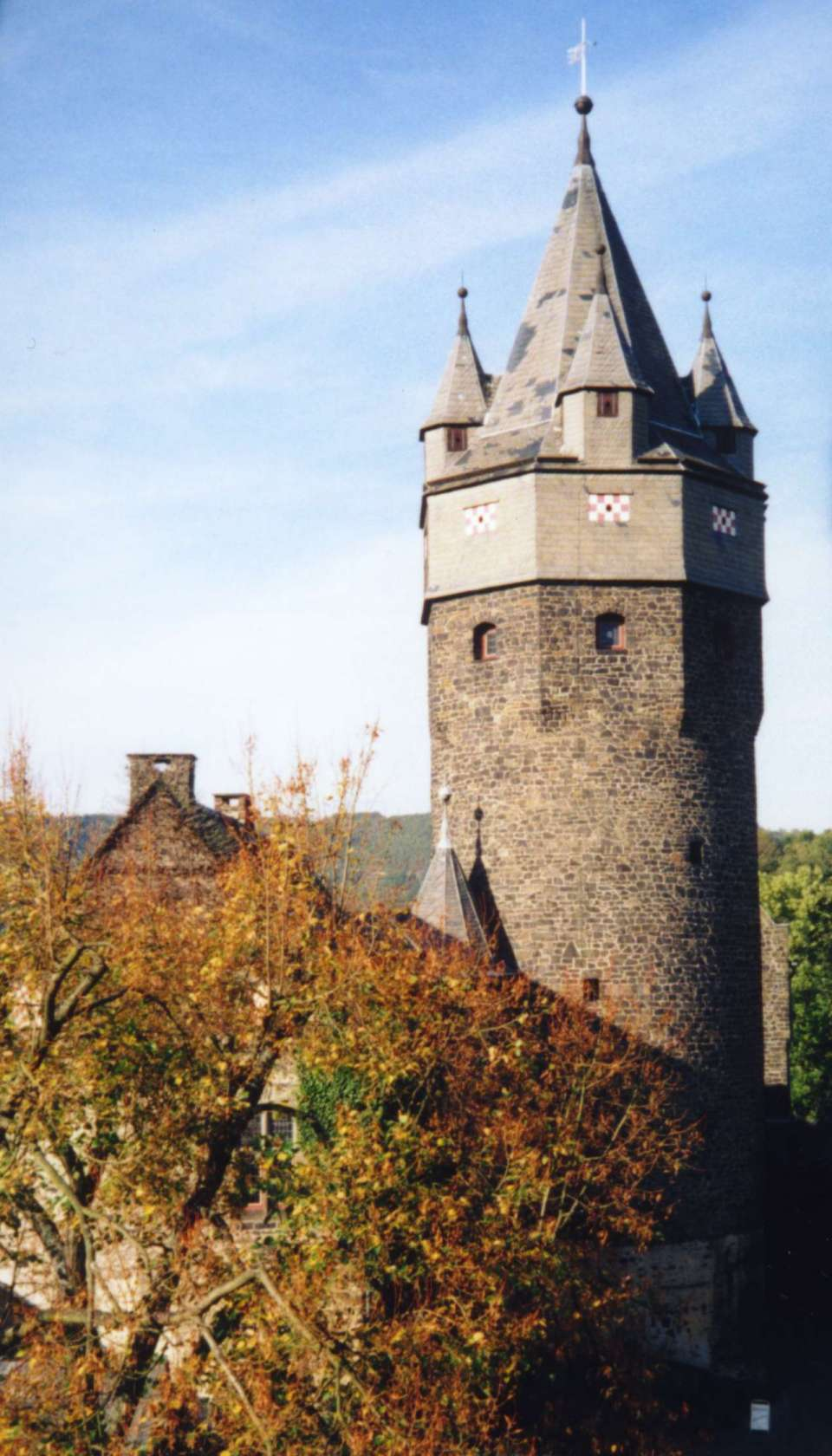
Burg Altena

The town's biggest attraction is the castle: Burg Altena. After being un-used for centuries it was in ruins, although part of the buildings was used as a hospital. A complete restoration was undertaken in 1909 to celebrate the 300th anniversary of the Prussian incorporation of the county of Mark into Prussia (Brandenburg). However, most of the work did not finish before 1914; the celebrations were then held at Hohensyburg Castle.

In 1912 the world's first youth hostel was created by Richard Schirrmann inside the castle. The old rooms are still on display, and new rooms inside the castle area are still part of the hostel today.

The dominant industry in Altena was wire production, and thus it has a museum dedicated to this industry only, the Drahtmuseum.

== Coat of arms ==
The coat of arms shows Catherine of Alexandria, the patron saint of the church built in 1310. She is depicted with a sword and a wheel, as she was killed in 307 by these two items. The choice of patron saint goes back to a vow made by Count Engelbert III of the Mark made at the burial place of Catherine in Jerusalem. The red and white checked fess refers to the coat of arms of the Counts of the Mark.

The coat of arms is quite old: a seal from the 15th century already depicts the same elements. In its current design it was created by Otto Hupp in 1938.

== Twin towns – sister cities ==
Altena is twinned with:

- Blackburn, England, United Kingdom (1972)
- Péronne, France (1967)
- Pinsk, Belarus (1990)

=== Friendship city ===
Altena is a friendship city with:

- Owensville, United States (2005)

== Notable people ==
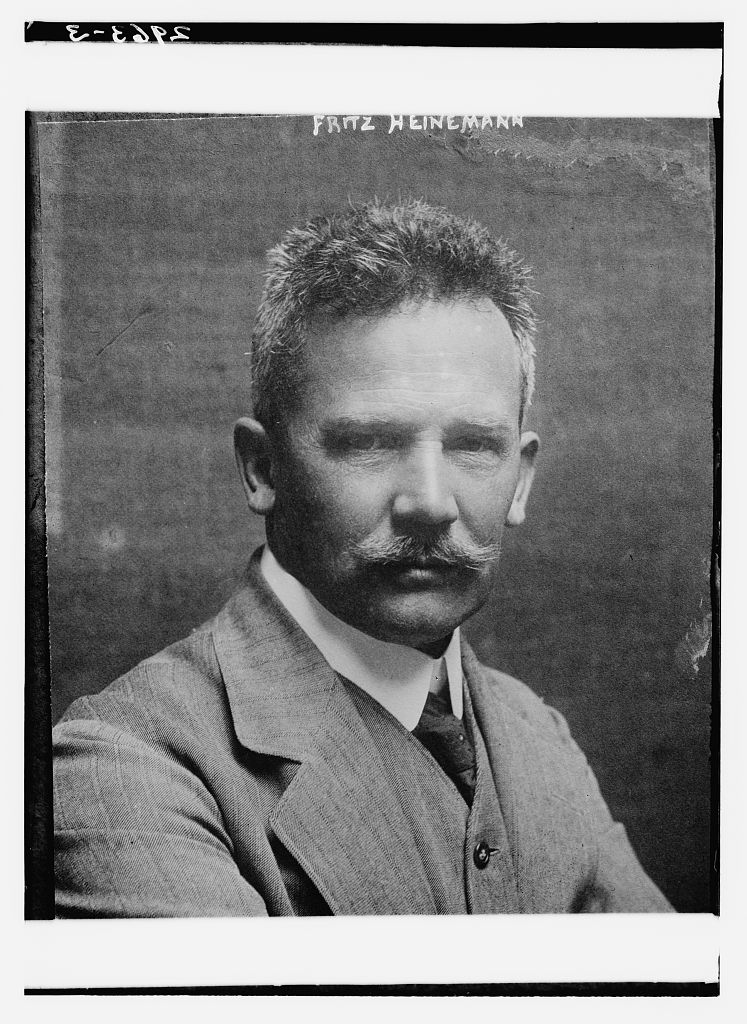
Fritz Heinemann

- Fritz Berg (1901–1979), first president of the Federation of the German Industry after Second World War
- Herbert Berg (1910–1938), racing driver
- Jason Dark (born 1945), pseudonym of the writer Helmut Rellergerd
- Fritz Heinemann (1864–1932), sculptor
- Léo Hirsch (1842–1906), German-born Jewish merchant, founder of the Brussels fashion house Hirsch & Cie
- Friedrich Sieburg (1893–1964), literary critic, journalist and writer
