= Altena Castle =

Castle in Altena, North Rhine-Westphalia, Germany

Coordinates: 51°17′56″N 07°40′31″E

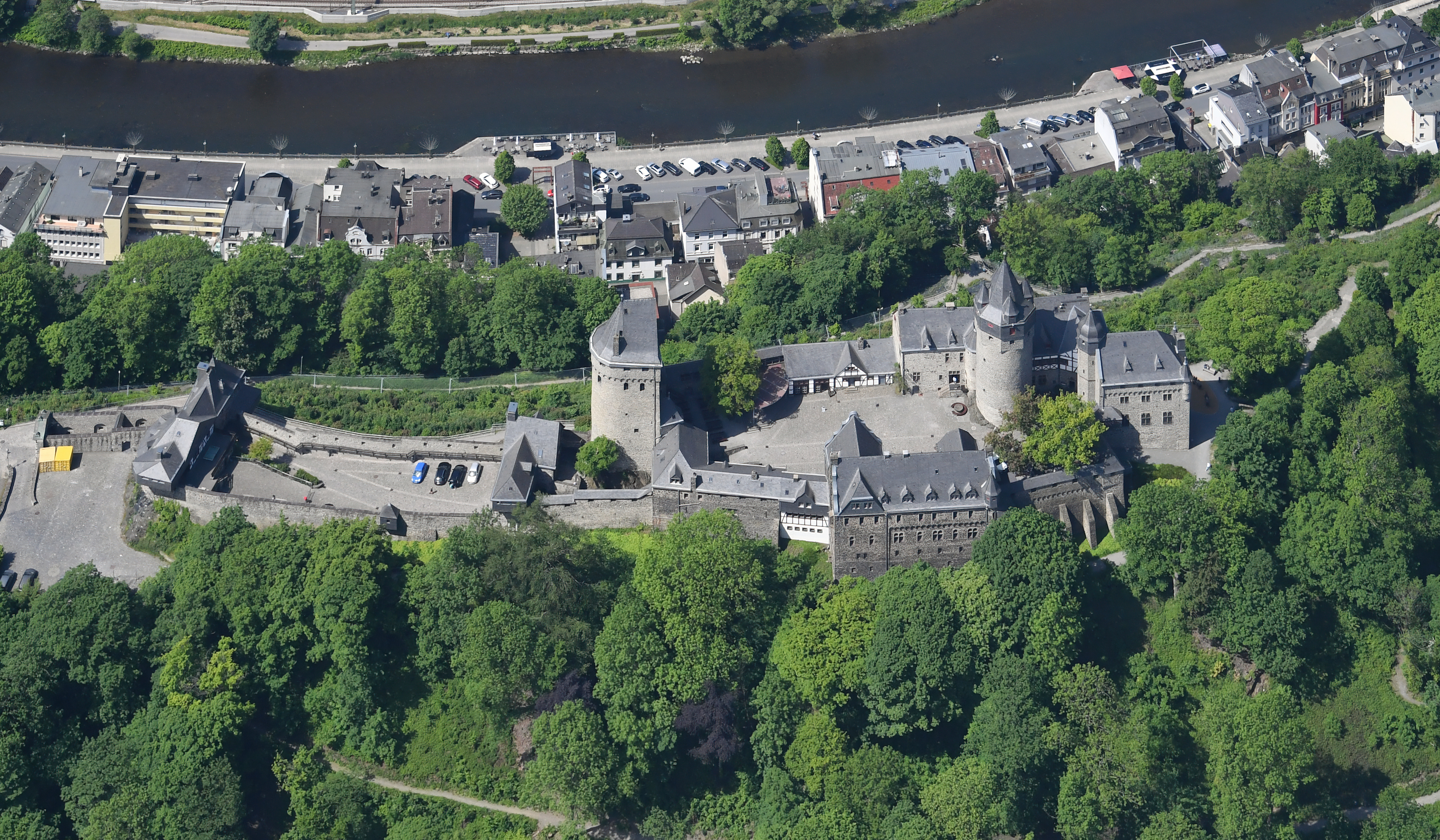
Aerial view of the Altena Castle from the east in 2023

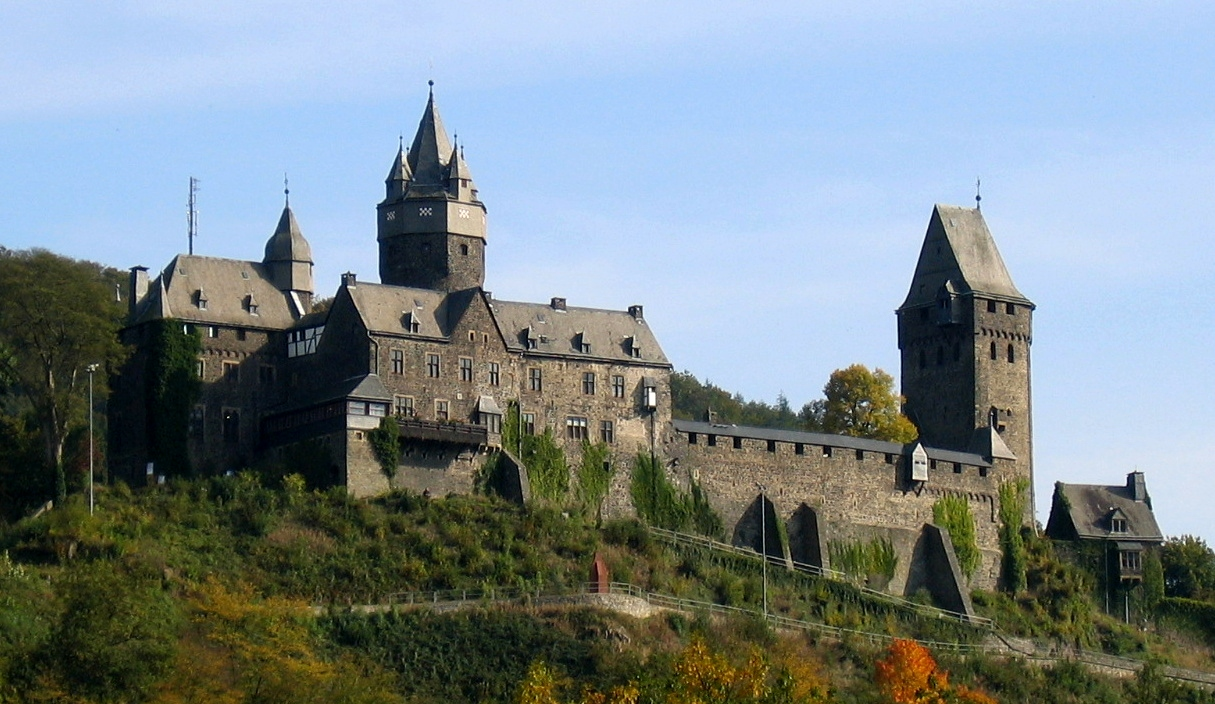
Exterior view of Altena Castle in 2005

Altena Castle (German: Burg Altena) is a medieval hill castle in the town of Altena in North Rhine-Westphalia. Built on a spur of Klusenberg hill, the castle lies near the Lenne in the Märkischer Kreis.

The castle was erected by the early Counts of Berg in the early 12th century. Eventually, the House of Berg abandoned Altena and moved their residence to Hamm.

== History ==
Supposedly, the castle was built by the brothers Adolf and Everhard von Berg around the year 1108 after Henry V granted them land in Sauerland for their loyal services. On Wulfseck Mountain they built their castle, which they named Wulfeshagen, later Altena. This is one of the several legends of the establishment of the county of Altena and the building of the castle.

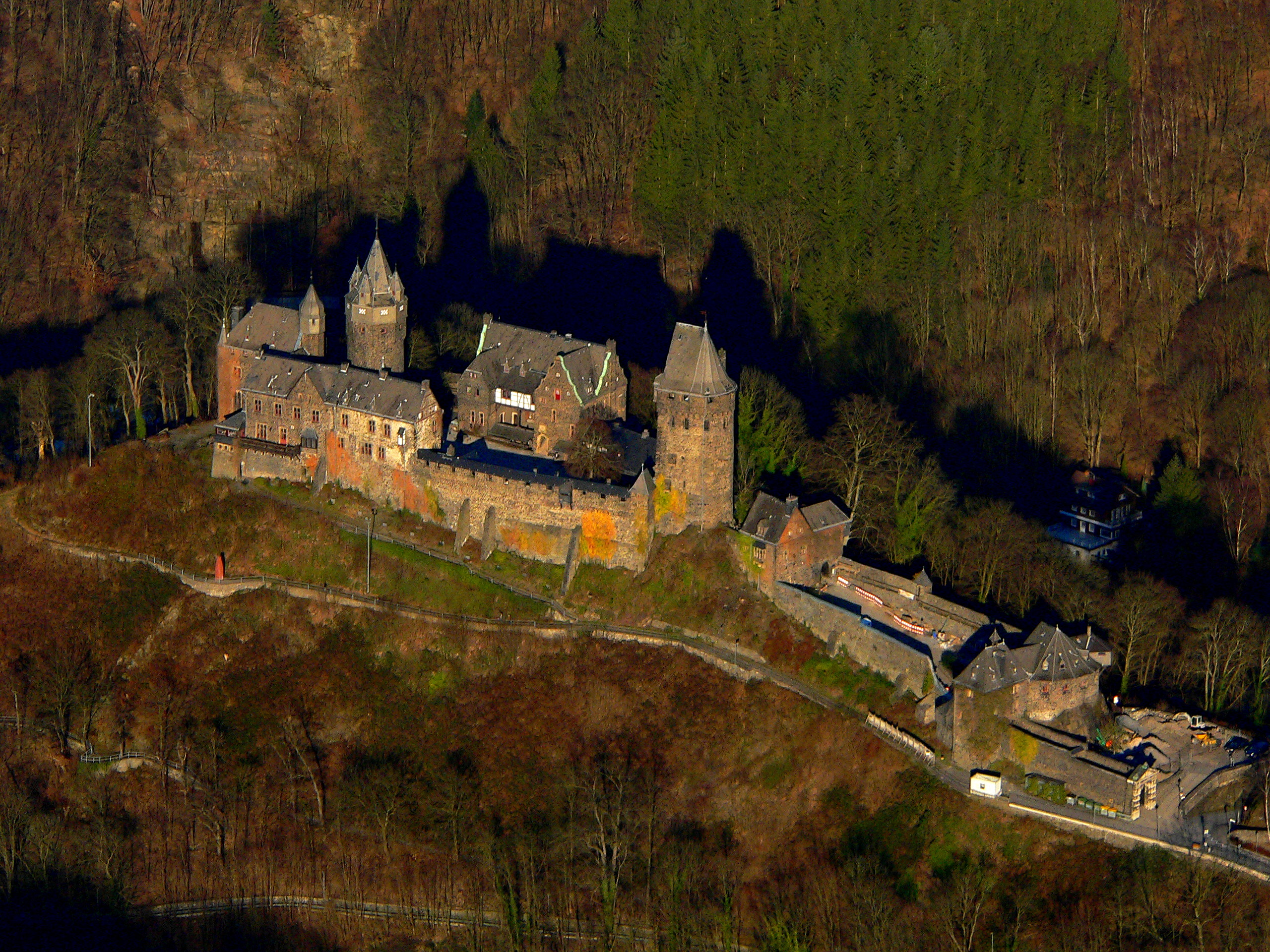
Altena Castle in 2008

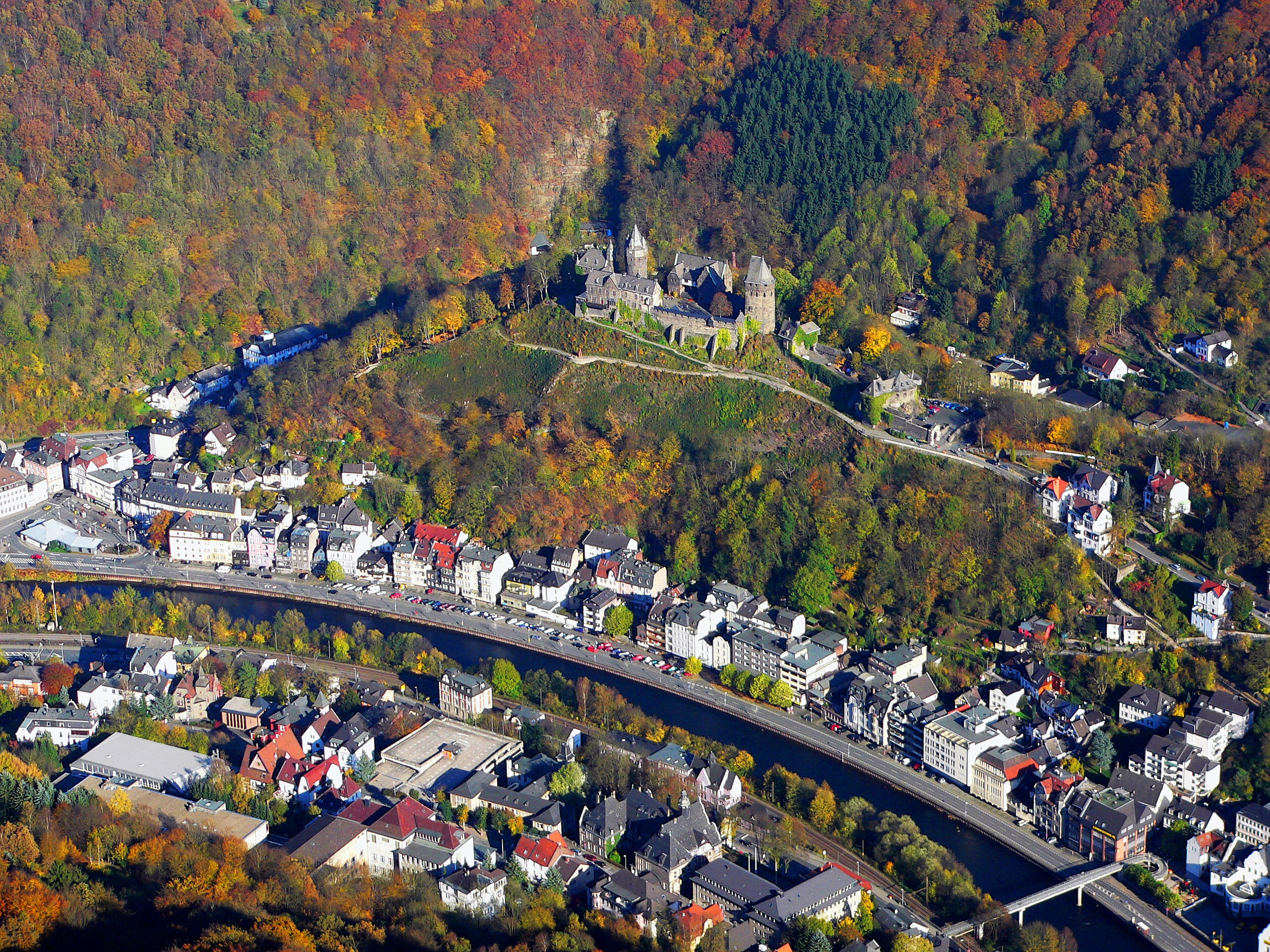
Castle and River Lenne in Altena in 2005

After the acquisition of the parish land near the city of Hamm in 1198, the counts of Altena took Mark Castle as their primary residence and called themselves the Counts of the Mark. They continued to only occasionally inhabit Altena Castle and from 1392 onward it was only used as a residence for the county bailiff (Amtmann). Count Engelbert III of the Mark gave the small settlement at the base of the mountain the rights of liberty (such as self-governance). In 1455 the castle burned down and was only re-erected partially.

In Brandenburg-Prussian times the castle became a garrison and was sold to the town of Altena in 1771. In the following years an almshouse and a workhouse was established there. This existed until 1840. From 1766 to 1811 there existed a criminal court and prison in the castle. By 1834 the castle was greatly deteriorated and was to be reconstructed. Due to lack of funds, however, this was not carried out. The Johanniter Order set up a hospital in the buildings.

Due to the 300th anniversary of the membership of the County of Mark to Brandenburg-Prussia in 1909 plans for a reconstruction of the castle began. In 1914 this was completed, apart from the outer bailey and lower gatehouse. There was a controversial debate about the modes of reconstruction, where the preference of historic designs over the medieval and early modern architecture was criticised. In 1918 the last works were completed.

In 1914, Richard Schirrmann established the world's first youth hostel within the castle, which is still in use today (Jugendherberge Burg Altena). The original rooms are a museum today. The youth hostel continues to run at a location on the lower castle court yard, opened in 1934.

Today the castle is symbol of the town of Altena and a tourist attraction. The entry ticket is also valid for the nearby Deutsche Drahtmuseum (German Wire Museum). During the first weekend of August a yearly Medieval Festival takes place in the castle and town. Part of the castle is used as a restaurant.

== See also ==
- Sauerland
- List of castles in North Rhine-Westphalia

== Literature ==
- Ferdinand Schmidt: Burg Altena - Blätter der Erinnerung für Freunde und Besucher unserer Burg, Märkischen Burgverein, 1924
- Wilhelm Quincke: Führer durch die Burg Altena, 1968
- Ernst Dossmann: Auf den Spuren der Grafen von der Mark. 3. Auflage. Mönning, Iserlohn 1992, ISBN 3-922885-14-4, S. 164–168.
