= Hostelling Scotland =

Youth hostel organization

- Abbreviation: Hostelling Scotland (HS)
- Formation: 1931
- Type: Scottish Charity SC013138
- Legal status: Company limited by guarantee SC310841
- Purpose: Inspire all, especially young people to experience Scotland through the provision of great value and welcoming hostelling accommodation.
- Headquarters: Stirling, Scotland
- Location: 53 hostels (29 HS, 24 affiliates)
- Region served: Scotland
- Members: 13,223 (2024-25)
- Official language: English, Gaelic
- Chair: Claire McCorquodale
- Chief Executive: Margo Paterson
- Affiliations: Hostelling International
- Revenue: £10,720,750
- Staff: 129 Low Season; 202 High Season (24/25)
- Website: Hostelling Scotland

Hostelling Scotland (SYHA; Gaelic: Comann Osdailean Òigridh na h-Alba) is part of Hostelling International and provides youth hostel accommodation in Scotland. As of September 2025 the organisation represents 53 hostels: 29 run by Hostelling Scotland and 24 affiliates.

Hostelling Scotland is a self-funding charitable organisation, and as a not-for-profit business invests all surplus back into the organisation, both to develop the network and to improve older hostels.

== History ==
The organisation was founded in 1931 as the Scottish Youth Hostels Association (SYHA). The first youth hostel in Scotland was a converted row of four cottages in Broadmeadows and opened on 2 May 1931.

In 1938, there were more than 60 hostels and membership was approaching 20,000. At its peak, the SYHA had 99 hostels; by 1995 this had reduced to 85. As of September 2025 there were 53 hostel in the network, 24 of which were independently-owned affiliate hostels such as those of the Gatliff Hebridean Hostel Trust and various local communities and authorities.

The organisation later became SYHA Hostelling Scotland, then in 2018, the organisation rebranded as Hostelling Scotland, dropping the SYHA from their name.

Today, Hostelling Scotland faces competition from the more numerous independent hostels, and from rural hotels which provide bunkhouse accommodation. It has been claimed that it has left its roots as a working class movement to "provide accommodation to people of limited means" behind, and become too expensive. The organisations's defenders, including Allan Wilson MSP, point out that hostellers today require higher levels of comfort than when the hostelling movement began.

== Operations ==
Tourist sign used to indicated location of a Youth Hostel

Hostels vary from modern purpose-built premises to historic buildings and country cottages, sited in major towns and cities and in rural locations, including remote islands. Accommodation is generally dormitory-style but increasingly this is being subdivided into smaller units. For example, the most modern hostel, Edinburgh Central, has many single and twin-bedded rooms with ensuite facilities. All have a lounge, shared bathrooms and self-catering kitchens. Many hostels also make meals available for guests.

During 2024-25, Hostelling Scotland recorded 332,977 overnight stays in directly-operated hostels during the year, an increase of 5% on the previous year's figure of 317,447. 24% of guests came from Scotland; 28% came from England, Wales and Ireland; 36% came from elsewhere in Europe; and 12% were from the rest of the world. A further 49,930 overnight stays were recorded in the affiliated hostels.

== Source material ==
- Martin, John (2012). An Illustrated Survey of SYHA's Youth Hostels 1931-2011. Stirling: SYHA.
