= Richard Schirrmann =

German teacher

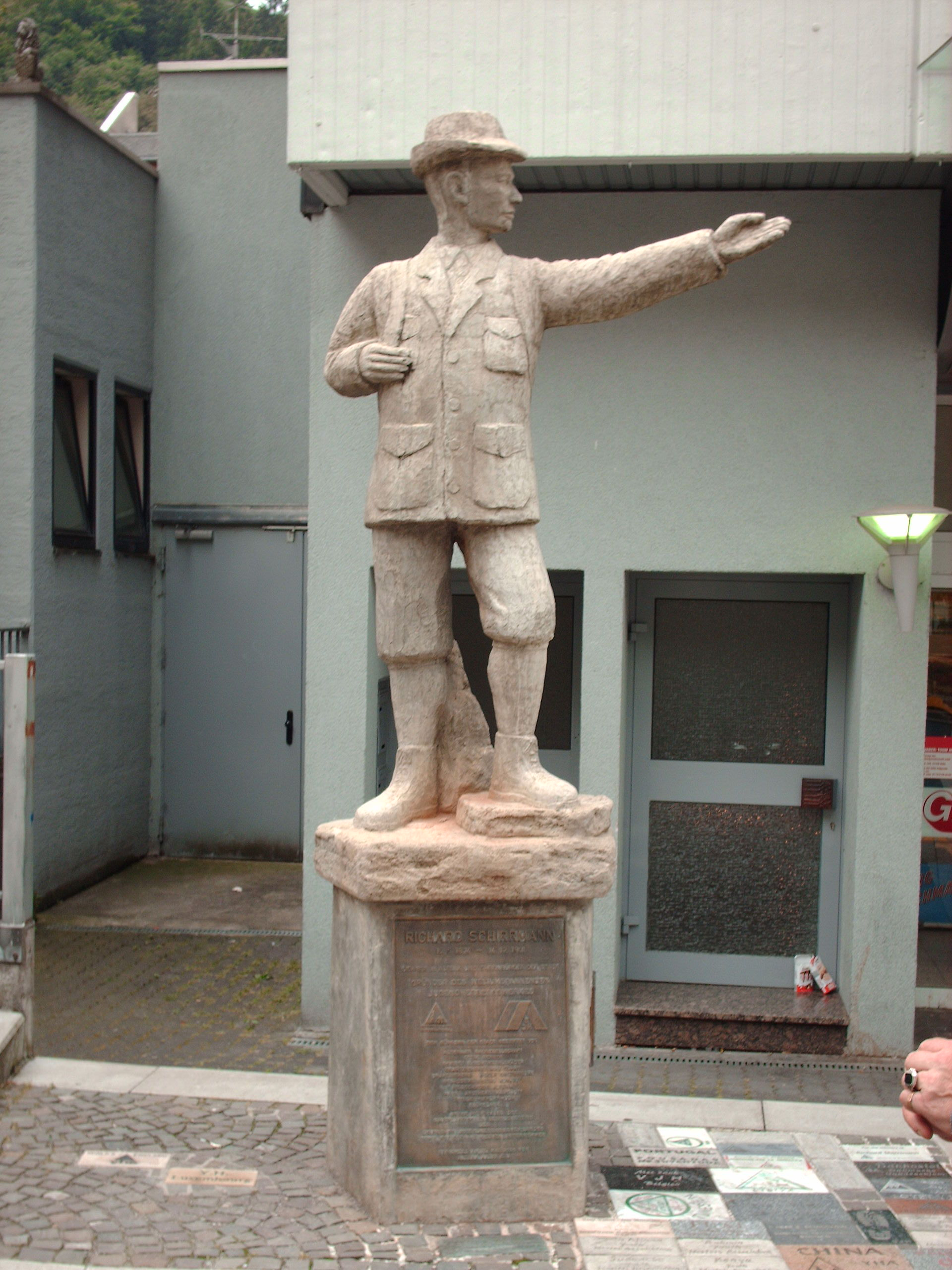
- Statue of Richard Schirrmann in Altena, Germany
- Born: 15 May 1874; Grunenfeld (today Gronówko), Province of Prussia (modern Poland)
- Died: 14 December 1961 (aged 87); Taunus, West Germany
- Occupation: Teacher
- Known for: Founder of the first hostel

Richard Schirrmann (15 May 1874 – 14 December 1961) was a German teacher and founder of the first hostel.

== Early life and education ==
Schirrmann was born in Grunenfeld, Province of Prussia (now Gronówko, Warmian-Masurian Voivodeship). His father, August Schirrmann was a teacher.

== Career ==
Richard Schirrmann became a teacher in 1895 after passing his teacher's examination in Karalene, near Insterburg, and was used as a teacher in the Kirchschule Königshöhe in Lötzen, then in Schrombehnen in Pr. Eylau. He took every opportunity to hold outdoors lessons. In 1903, he was transferred to Nette-Schule in Altena, Province of Westphalia where he met Wilhelm Münker, who later became his partner.

In August 1909, after a stormy school camping trip, Schirrmann proposed the idea of affordable youth travel gaining significant support and opened a makeshift hostel for hikers in his school.

On 1 June 1912, in Altena Castle, he opened the first official hostel now used as museum.

=== World War I ===
During the World War I, Schirrmann served in a regiment holding a position on the Bernhardstein, one of the Vosges Mountains – separated from the French troops by a narrow No man's land, which he described as "strewn with shattered trees, the ground ploughed up by shellfire, a wilderness of earth, tree-roots and tattered uniforms".

Schirrmann described a Western Front Christmas Truce in December 1915:

"When the Christmas bells sounded in the villages of the Vosges behind the lines... something fantastically unmilitary occurred. German and French troops spontaneously made peace and ceased hostilities; they visited each other through disused trench tunnels, and exchanged wine, cognac, and cigarettes for Westphalian black bread, biscuits, and ham. This suited them so well that they remained good friends even after Christmas was over."

Military discipline was soon restored, but Schirrmann pondered over the incident wondering whether "thoughtful young people of all countries could be provided with suitable meeting places where they could get to know each other". The war made him an even stronger proponent of hostels believing that hostels would be "bridges of peace" to foster international understanding.

=== Post War ===
In 1919, he founded German Youth Hostel Association. In 1922, he retired from teaching to focus entirely on hostels.

In 1925, he founded the children's village "Staumühle" on a former military training ground near Paderborn. Until 1931, every year during the summer months, he organized a school camp.

From 1933 to 1936, he served as President of the International Youth Hostelling Association (now Hostelling International), until the Government of Nazi Germany forced him to resign while the hostels were put under control of the Hitler Youth. After World War II, he played a key role in rebuilding the German association, and was recognized the Order of Merit of the Federal Republic of Germany (Bundesverdienstkreuz) in 1952.

In 1946, he was flown to the International Youth Hostel Conference in Scotland by an American friend on a private plane, making him the first German civilian to enter British territory after World War II.

Beginning in 1937, he lived in Grävenwiesbach, Taunus where he died in 1961.

== Personal life ==
Schirrmann married Gertrud in 1903. They had one daughter but Gertrud did not support Richard's plan and they divorced in 1929. He then married Elisabeth, who shared his passions. By 1942, she gave birth to 6 children.
