= Van Arkel =

Van Arkel may refer to:

== Chemistry ==
- Van Arkel–de Boer process
- Van Arkel–Ketelaar triangle

== People ==
- A medieval noble family in the County of Holland founded around 1000 AD near Arkel and lasting until 1412 AD. Their fief was called Land van Arkel.

Other people with this surname include:

- Anton Eduard van Arkel (1893–1976), Dutch chemist
- Frederique van Arkel (born 2000), Dutch cricketer
- Gerrit van Arkel (1858–1918), Dutch architect
- Heleen Van Arkel-de Greef (born 1965), Dutch chess master
- Maria van Arkel (c.1385–1415), Dutch noblewoman
