= Hoogblokland =

Coordinates: 51°52′N 4°59′E

- Flag Coat of arms

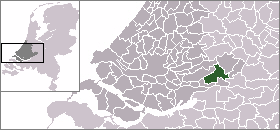

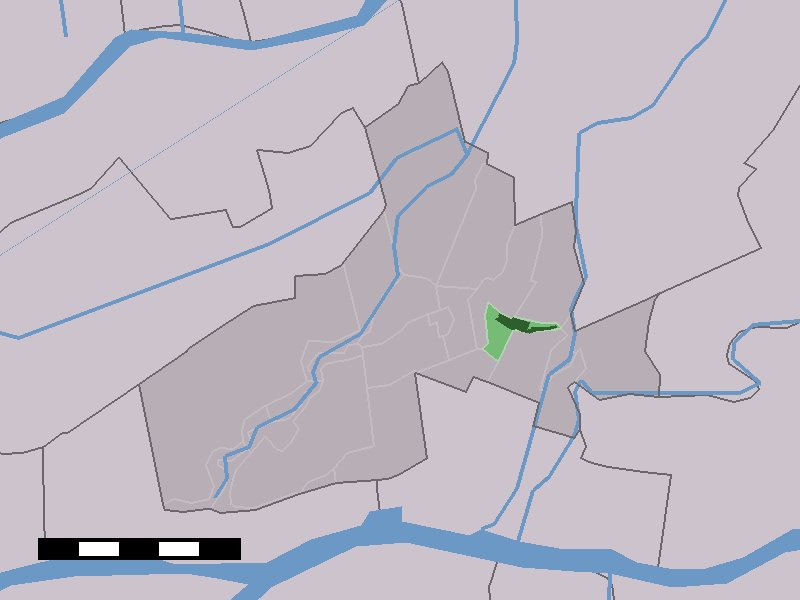
- The village centre (dark green) and the statistical district (light green) of Hoogblokland in the municipality of Giessenlanden.
- Country: Netherlands
- Province: South Holland
- Municipality: Molenlanden

Hoogblokland is a village in the municipality of Molenlanden, in the Dutch province of South Holland. The village lies in the Alblasserwaard, 34 miles (55 km) from the city of Gorinchem, and between the towns of Hoornaar and Arkel. Hoogblokland has 1,450 inhabitants (2023). Until 1986, Hoogblokland was an independent municipality. In that year, the place was added to the municipality of Giessenlanden. Since 2019 it has been part of the municipality of Molenlanden.

== History ==
Hoogblokland arose on natural sandy elevations (donken) in the peat area of the Alblasserwaard. The name Blokland is generally derived from "beloken land", a designation for an enclosed or surrounded area. In the Middle Ages, the area belonged to the Land of Arkel. The earliest known grant in fief of the seigneury of Blokland dates from 1323 (or 1332), with Dirk de Cock van Blokland as feudal tenant. The seigneury was initially called Overblokland and, after 1526, was named Hoog-Blokland, after the dike along which the buildings stood.

Hoogblokland was an independent municipality until 1 January 1986. In that year it merged with Arkel, Giessenburg, Hoornaar, Noordeloos and Schelluinen to form the new municipality of Giessenlanden. On 1 January 2019, Giessenlanden merged with Molenwaard to form the municipality of Molenlanden.

== Geography ==
Hoogblokland lies in the Alblasserwaard, north of Gorinchem and between Hoornaar and Arkel. The village core consists of ribbon development along the Dorpsweg, east of the A27 motorway. Another part of the built-up area lies along the Bazeldijk near the Merwede Canal. The surroundings are characterised by the polder structure of the peat meadow area, including the hamlet of Minkeloos and the outlying area.

The Bazeldijk is a dike of medieval origin, part of the historical hydraulic engineering system of the Alblasserwaard. In local tradition, the dike is sometimes associated with Emperor Napoleon, but no reliable historical sources are known for this.

== Facilities ==
Hoogblokland has a multifunctional centre (Den Hoek) with a community hall, a sports hall and childcare. The village has two primary schools, an outdoor swimming pool and a Reformed church. On the edge of the village lies the mini-campsite De Groene Waard. The village council (dorpsberaad) of Hoogblokland looks after the liveability of the community and forms the link between residents and the municipality of Molenlanden.

== Monuments and points of interest ==
The village core is characterised by preserved ribbon development with various monumental buildings. A defining feature is the Reformed village church from 1880. Hoogblokland has eight national monuments (rijksmonumenten) and eleven municipal monuments.

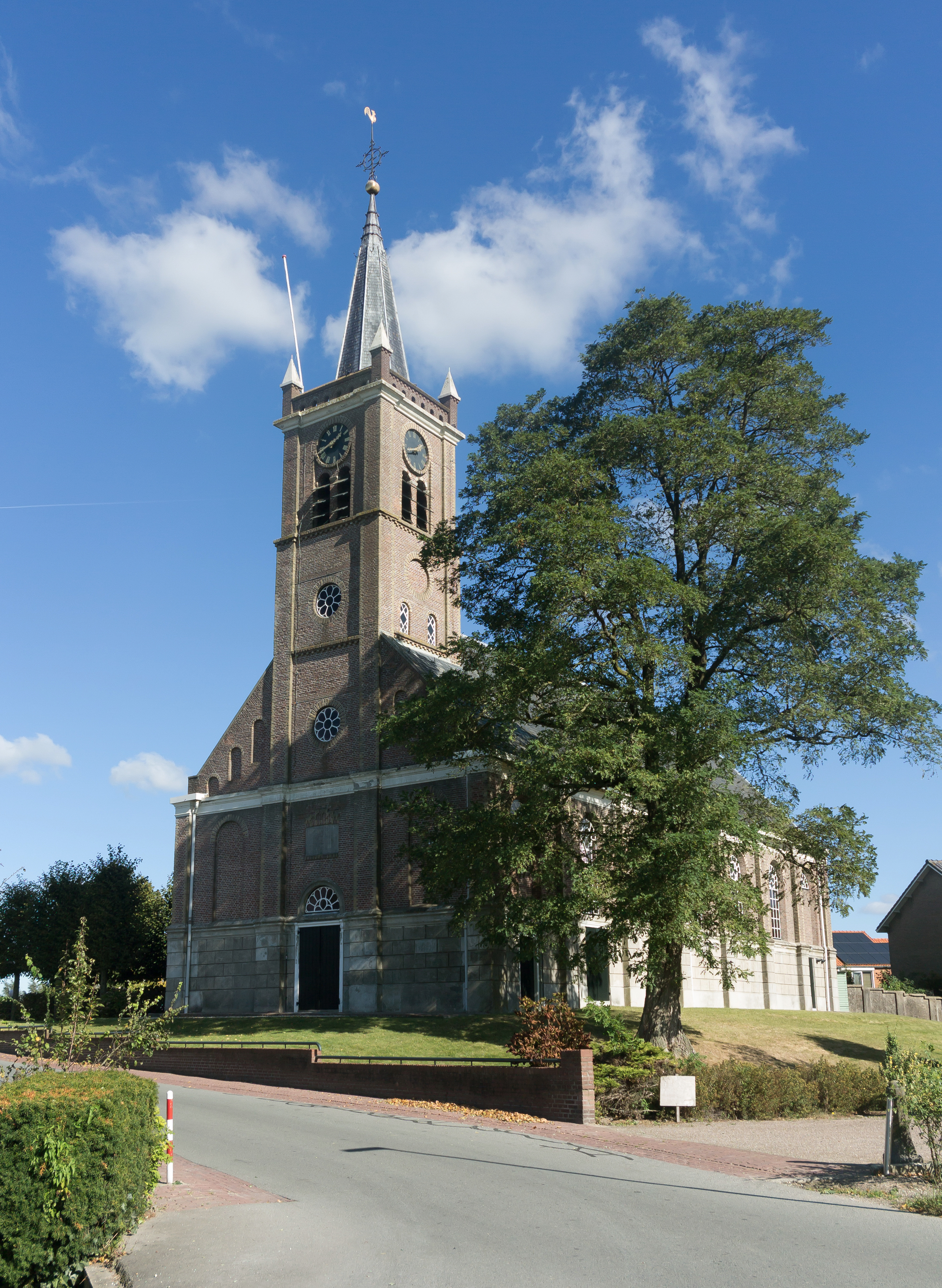
Church: de Dorpskerk

== Coat of arms ==
The former municipal coat of arms, confirmed on 24 July 1816 by the High Council of Nobility, was derived from the arms of the Van Arkel family. It lapsed with the municipal reorganisation of 1986.
