= Decleva =

Decleva is a surname. Variations of the spelling of this surname include Deklewa and Dekleva. In Croatia, this surname may belong to Croats, Slovenes, and Italians.

== Notable people ==
- Cvetana Dekleva (1963), Slovenian basketball player
- Enrico Decleva (1941-2020) Italian historian
- Milan Dekleva (1946), Slovenian poet
- Nikola Dekleva (1926-2003), Serbian surgeon of Slovene origin
- Vesna Dekleva (1975), Slovenian sailor
- Zoltán Decleva (1887–1950), Hungarian military officer

== See also ==
- Sandrine Dixson-Declève (1971), Belgian energy policy and climate change leader
- De Cleve
- Of Cleves
