= Achterdijk =

Achterdijk may refer to several places in the Netherlands:

- Achterdijk, North Brabant
- Achterdijk, Utrecht
