= John V, Lord of Arkel =

Medieval Dutch nobleman

John V, Count of Arkel
- Coat of arms of the House of Arkel
- Born: 11 September 1362; Gorinchem
- Died: 25 August 1428 (aged 65); Leerdam
- Noble family: House of Arkel
- Spouse: Joanna of Jülich
- Issue: William, Lord of Arkel; Maria van Arkel; Illegitimate: Otto; Henneke; Dirk; Wynand
- Father: Otto, Lord of Arkel
- Mother: Elisabeth of Bar-Pierrepont

John V, Lord of Arkel (11 September 1362 – 25 August 1428) was Lord of Arkel, Haastrecht and Hagestein and stadtholder of Holland, Zeeland and West Frisia. He was a son of Lord Otto of Arkel and his wife, Elisabeth of Bar-Pierrepont.

He acquired the Lordship of Haastrecht in 1380 and Hagestein in 1382. When he inherited Arkel from his father in 1396, he became a member of the court council of the Count of Holland.

== Career ==
During the reign of Albert I, the county suffered from a series of conflicts known as the Hook and Cod wars. John V sided with Albert I and the Cods. However, during a campaign in West Frisia, John V came into conflict with Albert's son, William VI, who sided with the Hooks. The murder of Aleid van Poelgeest may also have played a role in their animosity.

Albert informed his father that John was no longer a faithful ally and John declared himself independent and refused to participate in further campaigns against the Frisians. This triggered the Arkel War, in which William VI conquered Arkel. John V lost his land and spent the years 1415–1426 in captivity.

== Death ==
John V died in Leerdam in 1428. His son William inherited his claim on the Land of Arkel.

== Marriage and issue ==
On 18 October 1376, John married Joanna of Jülich, a daughter of Duke William II of Jülich and heiress to the Duchy of Guelders. She died in 1394. John and Joanna had two children:

- William (died 1 December 1417 in Gorinchem)
- Maria (died 1415 in IJsselstein), married John II, Count of Egmond

John also had four illegitimate children:

- Otto (died 1475 in Utrecht), married Jacobje of Arkel and had issue
- Henneke (died 1420), married John of Egmond, Lord of Wateringen
- Dirk
- Wynand (born 1426), goldsmith

William died when he tried to reconquer Gorinchem, which had been a possession of Arkel for many years. He was between 30 and 34 years old and had no male heir. The Land of Arkel was divided between Holland and Guelders.

John V, Lord of Arkel House of Arkel Born: 11 September 1362 Died: 25 August 1428
Preceded by Otto	Lord of Arkel; 1396–1412	Succeeded by William
