= Land van Arkel =

The Land van Arkel was a fief of the Counts of Holland, and was managed by the Lords of Arkel until 1412. The territory was bordered by the river Merwede on the south, and the river Linge on the east. The northern border might have reached as far as Everdingen, and the western border to the river Lek. Present-day towns in the territory include Leerdam, Arkel, Heukelum, Asperen, Hagestein, Haastrecht and Gorinchem.

== History ==
Coat of arms of Arkel

Around 1234–1240, Herbaren II, lord of Ter Leede, is supposed to have moved to Arkel in order to settle there. He was the founder of the house of Arkel. He left the lordship Ter Leede (presumably located just south of modern Leerdam) to his younger brother. His son John II is named as vassal of the Count of Holland in a 1253 chronicle. Jan II was assigned a somewhat larger territory, stretching all the way to the river Merwede.

In 1260 the lords of Arkel gained possession of Bergambacht, but they were at a disadvantage because their properties were scattered. In 1272, the port of Gorinchem was bought from the lord of Bentheim, which allowed for toll collection on the Lek and Merwede rivers. There was a flourishing trade from which the lords of Arkel were able to profit considerably. Several castles were built, the most famous in Asperen, Haastrecht and Gorinchem (1267). The lords stayed mostly in this last castle in Gorinchem. In 1290, John II dedicated his castle at Gorinchem to his feudal liege lord, Floris V, count of Holland, in deference to his authority.

After John II van der Lede died without offspring in 1305, John III of Arkel inherited the lordship of Ter Leede. In 1351 the lands around the Lek river were added to their possessions. Haastrecht was also added. Otto gave Gorinchem, Hagestein and Leerdam city rights in 1382. The power of the Lords of Arkel was at its highest at the end of the 14th century; the fortress on the eastern bank of the city of Gorinchem becoming known as The Imperial Castle.

The Duchy of Gelderland, the County of Holland and the Prince-Bishopric of Utrecht watched grudgingly as the economic and military powers of the fiefdom grew. What followed was the Arkel War, which broke out in 1401, after a dispute with Duke Albert I of Bavaria, who was also the Count of Holland. John V managed to maintain his position until 1412, when he was driven to Vuren, where he was captured. He spent the rest of his life in captivity in Gouda and Leerdam. His son William of Arkel led a revolt in 1417, but was killed. The power of dynasty thus came to an end, although the descendants of Maria van Arkel, the daughter of John V, would eventually acquire major political powers in Gelre.

The castle of Gorinchem was demolished in 1413. A new castle was built for the Counts of Holland, south of the city walls. This castle was known as the Blue Tower.

== Lords of Arkel ==
- Herbaren II van der Lede (ca.1200 - 1257), received possession of the lordship Arkel (Arcelo, Arclo)
- Jan I van Arkel, (1233–1272), nicknamed The Strong
- Jan II van Arkel, (1269–1296)
- Nicolas van Arkel, regent (died in 1345)
- Jan III van Arkel, (1280–1324)
- Jan IV van Arkel, (1305–1360)
- Otto, Lord of Arkel (1330–1396)
- John V, Lord of Arkel, (1362–1428), nicknamed The Stadtholder.
  - William, son and successor of John V, however, their territory had been confiscated by the Count of Holland
  - Maria, daughter of John V, married to John II, Count of Egmond

== Findings ==
In 2003 a pillar was found at the streets Artilleriekade and Struisvogelstreet in Gorinchem. It was dated to the 14th century and must have been part of the residence where the lords of Arkel resided. In 2006 foundations of a castle belonging to the lords of Arkel were dug up in Hagestein.

== Sources ==
- Translated from the Dutch nl:Land van Arkel
