= Elisabeth de Bar =

Elizabeth of Bar
- Born: c. 1345; Hagestein
- Died: c. 1410; Pierrepont
- Noble family: House of Bar
- Spouse: Otto, Lord of Arkel
- Issue: John V, Lord of Arkel
- Father: Theobald de Bar
- Mother: Marie de Namur

Elizabeth of Bar also known as Elisabeth (Isabel) de Bar-Pierrepont, was born c. 1345 at Hagestein, Netherlands. She was the youngest daughter of Theobald de Bar, Seigneur de Pierrepont and his wife Marie de Namur. When her father, Theobald, died between 2 August 1353 and 6 July 1354, and because he had no legitimate male heir, she became the heiress of Bar-Pierrepont.

She married Otto, Lord of Arkel, son of John IV, Lord of Arkel and Irmgard of Cleves, somewhere before 18 October 1360. They had one son, John V, Lord of Arkel, born on September 11, 1362, in Gorinchem.

Elisabeth died before 11 May 1411 at Pierrepont, France.

== Issue ==
- John V, Lord of Arkel (b. 11 Sep 1362, Gorinchem - d. 25 August 1428, Leerdam)
