= Frans van der Gun =

Dutch politician (1918–2001)

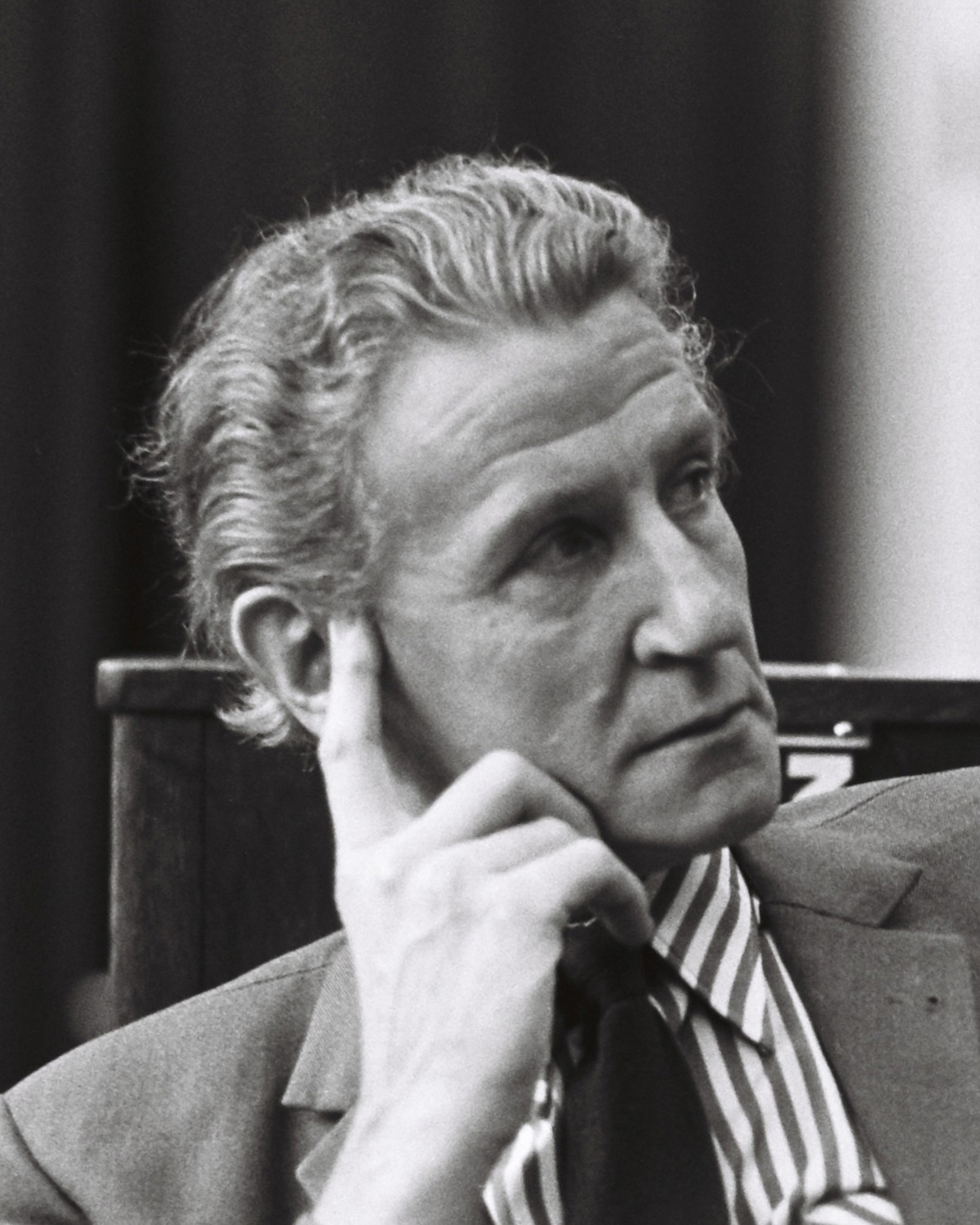
- Van der Gun in 1976
- Born: Franciscus Gerardus van der Gun; November 24, 1918; Hagestein
- Died: November 16, 2001; Utrecht
- Occupations: Politician, trade unionist
- Office: Member of the House of Representatives (1971–1979), Member of the European Parliament I term (1979–1982)
- Political party: KVP, CDA

Franciscus Gerardus (Frans) van der Gun (November 24, 1918, Hagestein – November 16, 2001, Utrecht) was a Dutch politician and trade unionist who served as a Member of the House of Representatives and later as a Member of the European Parliament.

== Biography ==
After World War II he became a member of the Nederlands Katholiek Vakverbond trade union, serving as its general secretary from 1954. He became involved in politics within the Catholic People's Party (including as its vice chairman), and later the Christian Democratic Appeal.

From 1950 to 1971 he served on the Utrecht provincial council, and from 1970 to 1971, also on the Hagestein municipal council.

He represented the CDA in the lower chamber of the Dutch parliament from 1971 to 1979.

From 1973 to 1974 he served as a secretary of state in the Ministry of Defense (he resigned for health reasons).

In 1979 he was elected as a Member of the European Parliament. He joined the European People's Party and served on the Committee on External Economic Relations.

He resigned from his mandate on December 31, 1981.
