= William, Lord of Arkel =

Dutch nobleman (d. 1417)

- Coat of arms of the House of Arkel
- Born: c. 1385
- Died: 1 December 1417; Gorinchem
- Noble family: House of Arkel
- Father: John V, Lord of Arkel
- Mother: Joanna of Jülich

William Otto, Lord of Arkel (c. 1385 – 1 December 1417 in Gorinchem) was the male member of the House of Arkel. He styled himself Lord of Arkel, although his father had lost control of Arkel in 1412, and William's attempt to regain it, failed. He positioned himself as a potential successor of the childless Duke Reinald IV of Guelders and Jülich; however, this attempt was also unsuccessful.

He was the only legitimate son of John V and his wife Joanna of Jülich. His sister, Maria van Arkel married John II, Count of Egmond. In 1406, the city of Gorinchem asked him to lead their revolt against his father. He does so, but after manipulations by both sides, he leaves Gorinchem and sides with his father again. At the end of the Arkel War, Count William VI of Holland captured Gorinchem and William of Arkel fled to Brabant.

In 1417, William made an attempt to recapture Gorinchem. He laid siege to the city. William and his Cod allies managed to enter the city. However, in the narrow streets around Revetsteeg, he was mortally wounded. He died on the spot.

William had no legitimate children.

== Legend ==
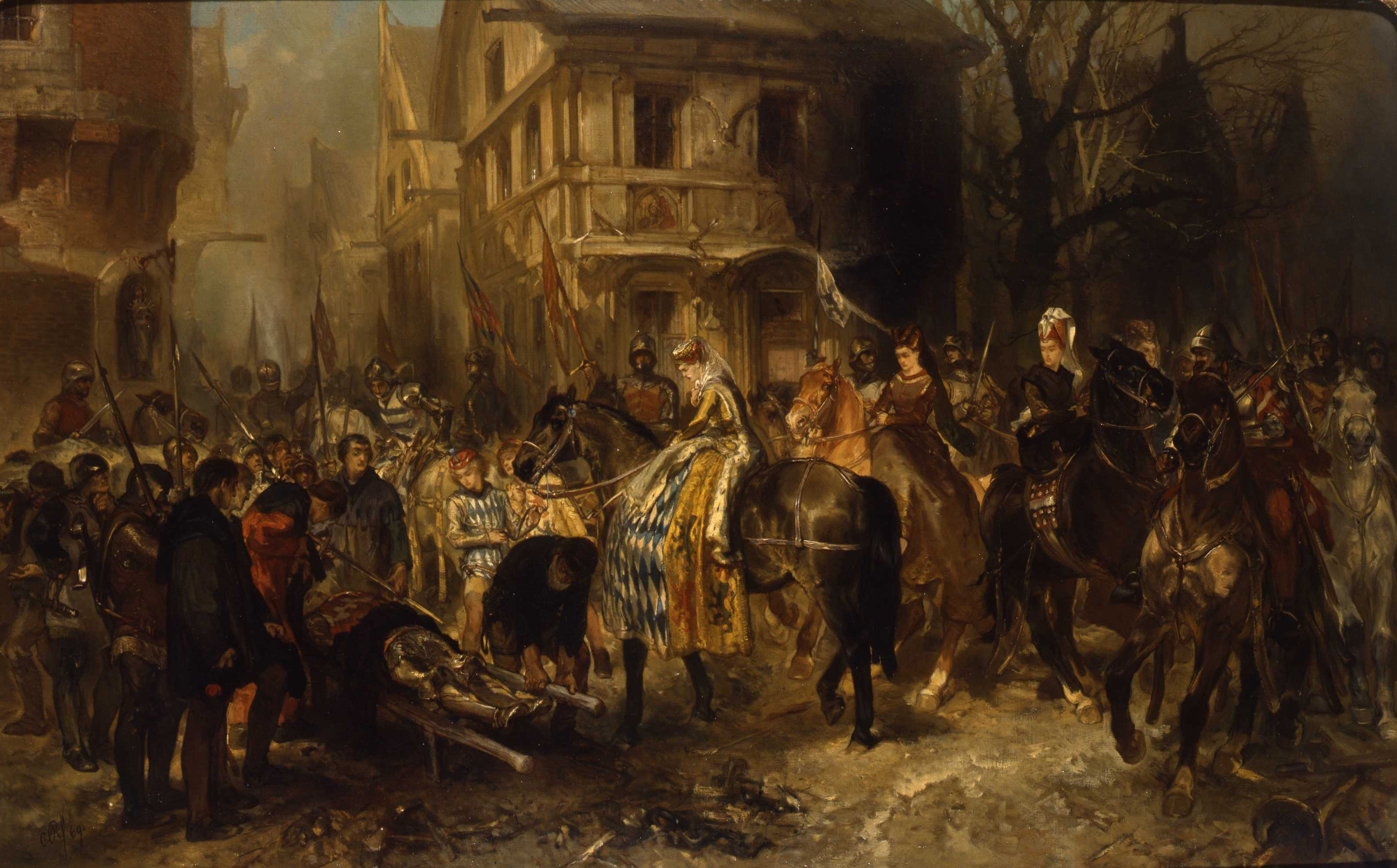
Painting by Charles Rochussen depicting the event

According to legend, Countess Jaqueline rushed from her castle toward William after he was wounded. Legend doesn't explain whether she wanted to comfort him as he died, protect his corpse, or create an alliance with him.

In 1662, a play was published by J. van Paffenrode, based on research by Abraham Kemp, which suggested a romantic relationship had existed between William and Jacqueline.

This story was later used in a romantic novel entitled Jacoba en Bertha ("Jaqueline and Berta") by Jacob van Lennep. In 1837, miss Antoinet van Buren-Schele write a novel Grootheid en de val van de Heeren van Arkel ("Rise and Fall of the Lords of Arkel"), which used these earlier stories.

In 2004, Ines van Bokhoven published Verraad! De wraak van de graaf ("Betrayal! The count's revenge"), about William's life and the Arkel War.
