= Otto, Lord of Arkel =

Dutch noble

- Coat of arms of the House of Arkel
- Born: c. 1330
- Died: 26 March 1396 or 1 April 1396
- Noble family: House of Arkel
- Spouse: Elisabeth of Bar-Pierrepont
- Issue Detail: John V, Lord of Arkel
- Father: John IV, Lord of Arkel
- Mother: Irmgard of Cleves

Otto, Lord of Arkel (c. 1330 – 26 March or 1 April 1396) was Lord of Arkel from 6 May 1360 until his death.

== Life ==
He was a son of John IV and his wife, Irmgard of Cleves. Otto was born as his parents' second son, after his elder brother John, who died during a tournament in Dordrecht in 1352. During his reign, he further extended the family possessions: he acquired the Lordship of Haastrecht again, and in 1379, he acquired Liesveld.

Otto became an advisor to Count Albert of Holland. Albert claimed the County of Cleves, after John, the last count, died. However, the Emperor gave Cleves to Adolph II of the Marck. This caused a lasting animosity between the Houses of Arkel and La Marck.

In 1382, Otto granted town privileges to Gorinchem, Hagestein and Leerdam. In the following years, Otto tried to combine Hagestein Castle and the village of Gasperde and create a new town out of this combination. This was triggered by the Lords of Vianen, who were expanding their territory to the south-west, by annexing Noordeloos and Meerkerk. This isolated some manors Arkel owned in this area. Also, the Lords of Vianen sided with the Hooks.

== Marriage and issue ==
Otto married in 1360 in Deventer to Elisabeth de Bar (d. 1410), daughter and heiress of Theobald of Bar, Seigneur de Pierrepont. They had one son:

- John V (1362-1428), succeeded Otto as Lord of Arkel.

Otto's illegitimate sons:

- Hendrick of Nyenstein
- John, the bastard of Arkel (d. 1405)
- John of Ravestein

== Footnotes ==
Otto, Lord of Arkel House of Arkel Born: c. 1330 Died: 26 March or 1 April 1396
Preceded by John IV	Lord of Arkel; 1360–1396	Succeeded by John V
