= Of Cleves =

Toponymic epithet

Of Cleves is a toponymic epithet associated with the Duchy of Cleves. Notable persons with this byname include:

- Adolph of Cleves, Lord of Ravenstein
- Agnes of Cleves
- Adelaide of Cleves
- Amalia of Cleves
- Anna of Cleves (1495–1567), daughter of John II of Cleves, married to Philip III of Waldeck-Eisenberg
- Anne of Cleves (1515–1557), daughter of John III of Cleves, married to Henry VIII of England
- Anna of Cleves (1552–1632), daughter of William V of Cleves, married to Philip Louis, Count Palatine of Neuburg
- Anna, Duchess of Cleves (1576–1625), daughter of Albert Frederick of Prussia, married to John Sigismund, Elector of Brandenburg
- Catherine of Cleves
- Catherine of Cleves (1417–1479)
- Elisabeth of Cleves
- Elisabeth of Cleves, Countess of Schwarzburg-Blankenburg
- Henriette of Cleves
- Irmgard of Cleves
- John, Count of Cleves (1293-1368), count of Cleves from 1347 to 1368;
- John I, Duke of Cleves, duke of Cleves from 1448 to 1481;
- John II, Duke of Cleves, duke of Cleves from 1481 to 1521;
- John III, Duke of Cleves, duke of Clèves from 1521 to 1539.
- Margaret of Cleves (died 1190), wife of Louis III, Landgrave of Thuringia
- Margaret of Cleves (died 1251), wife of Otto II, Count of Guelders
- Margaret of Cleves (daughter of Dietrich VII, Count of Cleves), wife of Henry of Lodi (d. 1337) (son of Guy, Count of Flanders)
- Margaret of Cleves, Countess of the Marck (c. 1310 – c. 1341), wife of Adolf II van der Mark
- Margaret of Cleves, Duchess of Bavaria-Straubing (c. 1375–1411), wife of Albrecht of Bavaria
- Margaret of Cleves, Duchess of Bavaria-Munich (1416–44), wife of William III of Bavaria and Ulrich V of Württemberg
- Marie of Cleves, Duchess of Orléans
- Marie of Cleves, Princess of Condé
- Marie Eleonore of Cleves
- Philip of Cleves, Lord of Ravenstein (1459–1528), noble and army commander
- Philip of Cleves (bishop) (1467–1505), Bishop of Nevers, Amiens and Autun
- Sibylle of Cleves

== See also ==
- La Princesse de Clèves
