= Giessenlanden =

- Former municipality
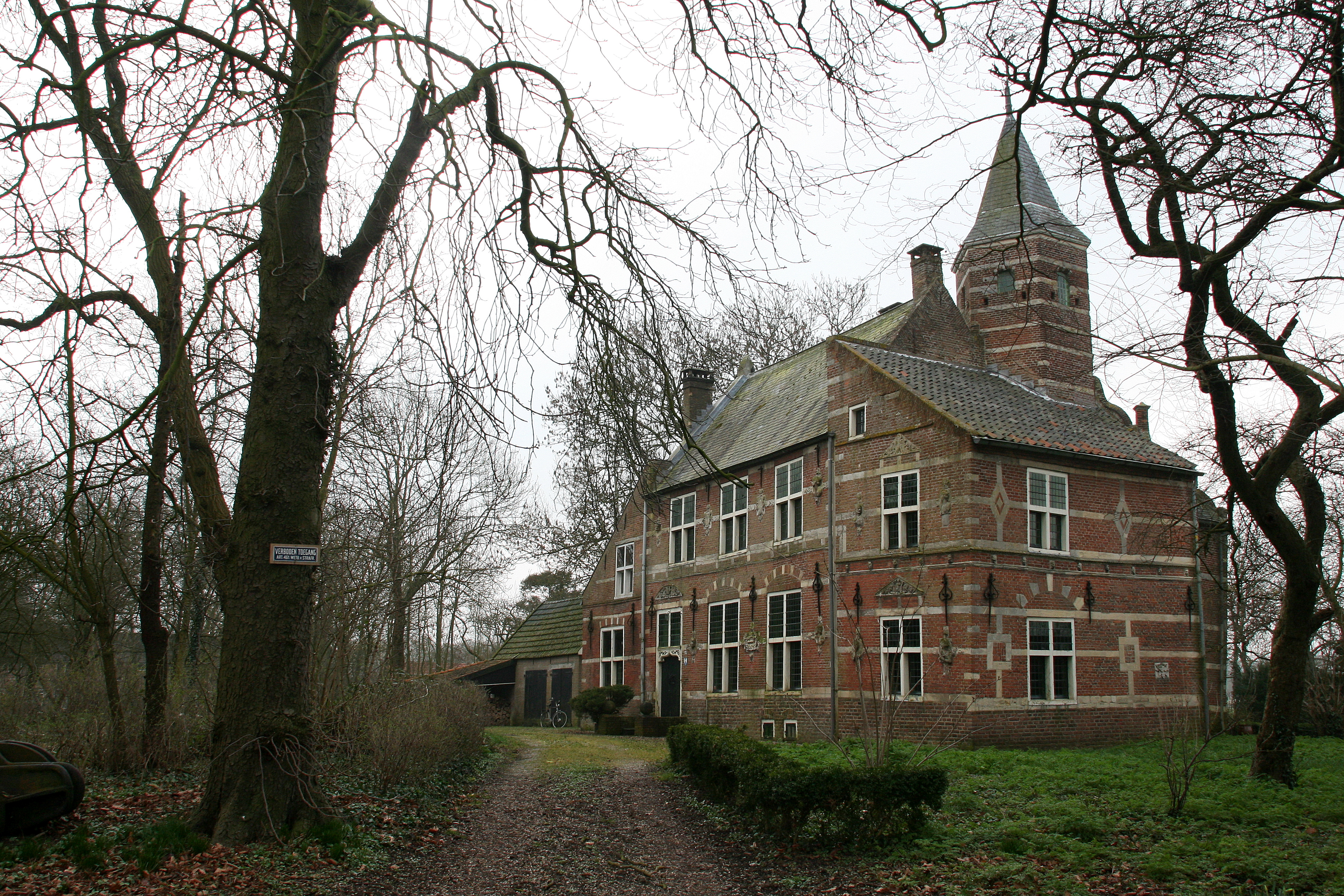
- Castle in Schelluinen

- Flag Coat of arms

- Location in South Holland
- Coordinates: 51°53′N 4°57′E
- Country: Netherlands
- Province: South Holland
- Municipality: Molenlanden
- Established: 1 January 1986
- Merged: 2019

Area
  - Total: 65.11 km^{2} (25.14 sq mi)
  - Land: 63.57 km^{2} (24.54 sq mi)
  - Water: 1.54 km^{2} (0.59 sq mi)
- Elevation: −1 m (−3.3 ft)

Population (January 2021)
  - Total: data missing
- Time zone: UTC+1 (CET)
  - Summer (DST): UTC+2 (CEST)
- Postcode: 3380–3381, 4209, 4220–4225, 4240–4241
- Area code: 0183, 0184
- Website: www.giessenlanden.nl

Giessenlanden (Dutch: [ˈɣisə(n)ˌlɑndə(n)]) is a former municipality in the western Netherlands, in the province of South Holland. The municipality covered an area of 65.11 km^{2} (25.14 sq mi) of which 1.54 km^{2} (0.59 sq mi) is water, and had a population of data missing as of 2021. The municipality included communities of Arkel, Giessen-Oudekerk, Giessenburg, Hoogblokland, Hoornaar, Noordeloos and Schelluinen.

Cees Bakker was the first mayor of Giessenlanden.

On 1 January 2019, it merged with Molenwaard to form the new municipality of Molenlanden.

== Topography ==
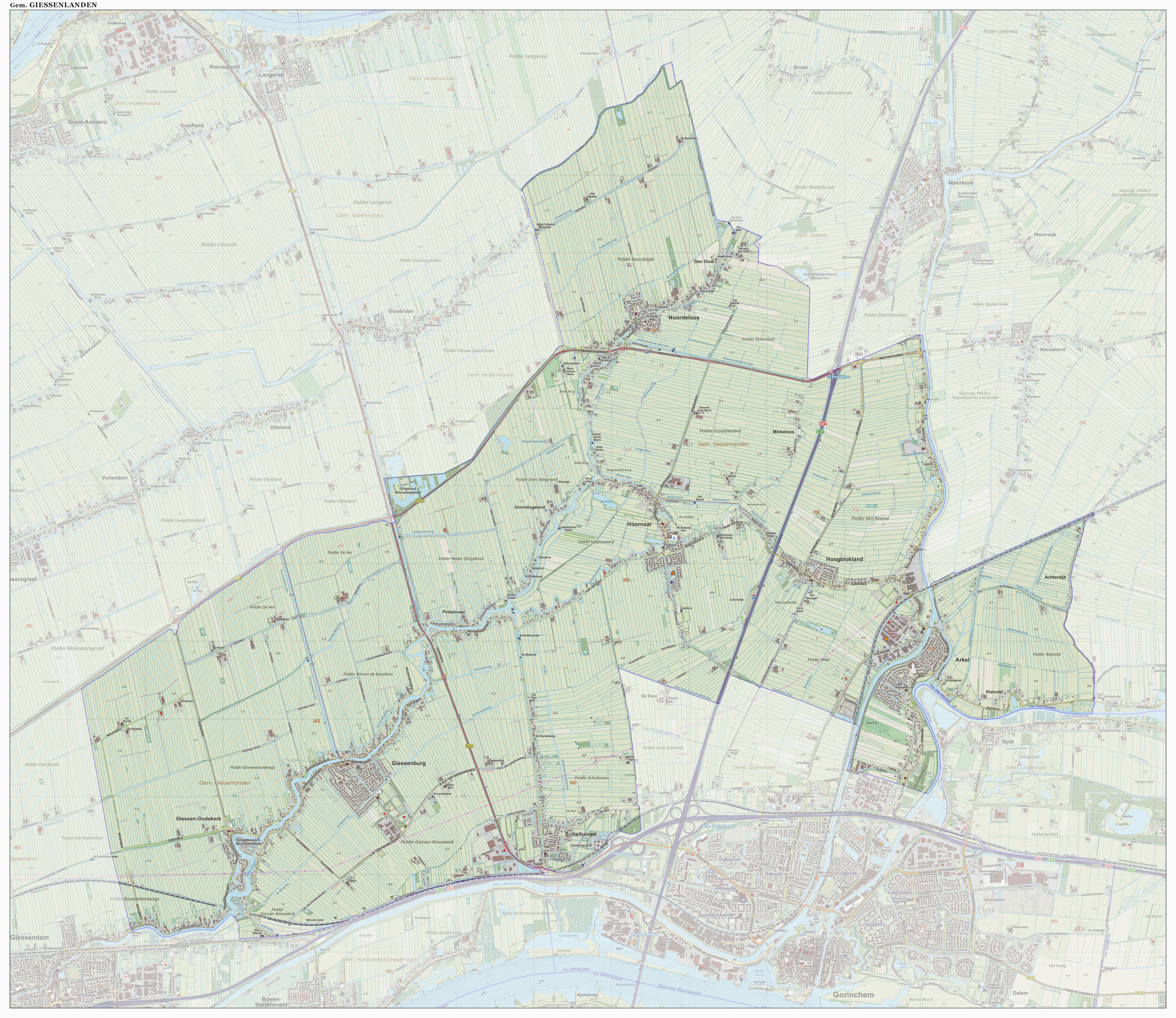

Dutch topographic map of the municipality of Giessenlanden, June 2015

== Public transportation ==
The Arkel railway station, on the Elst–Dordrecht railway, is situated in the municipality Giessenlanden.
