= Dietrich V of Cleves =

Dietrich V, Count of Cleves
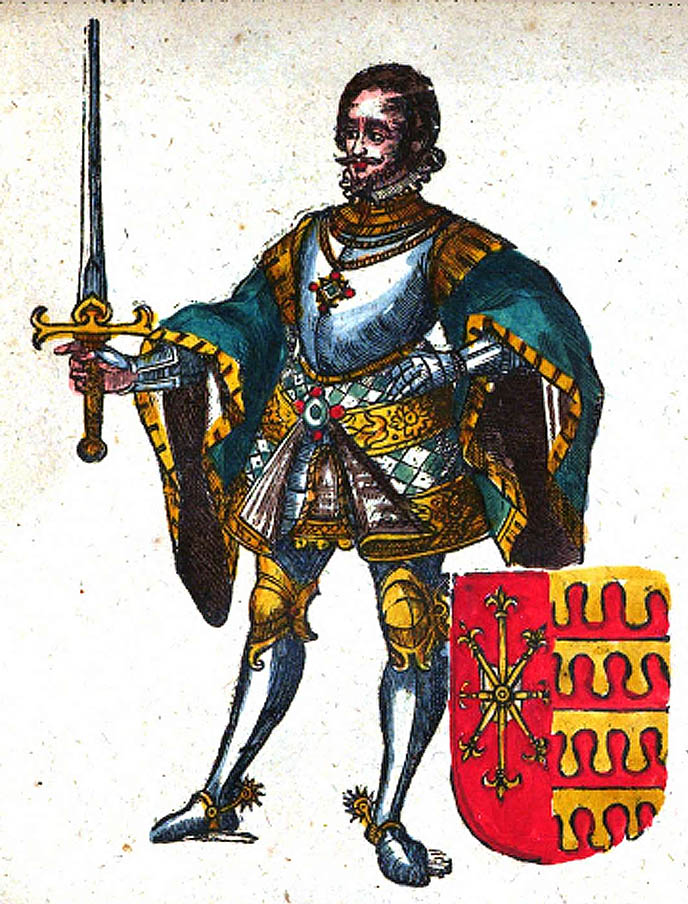
- Born: 1185; Kleve
- Died: 1260 (aged 74–75)
- Noble family: House of Cleves
- Spouses: Mathilda of Dinslaken; Hedwig of Meissen
- Issue Detail: Margaretha of Cleves; Dietrich VI, Count of Cleves; Dietrich Luf I of Cleves; Agnes of Cleves
- Father: Dietrich IV, Count of Cleves
- Mother: Margaret of Holland

Dietrich V was Count of Cleves from 1202 through 1260.

== Personal life ==
Dietrich was born about 1185 as the son of Dietrich IV, Count of Cleves and Margaret of Holland.

In 1234, he participated in the Stedinger Crusade.

== Marriage and issue ==
In c. 1215 he married Mathilda of Dinslaken (d. 1226). Their children were:

- Dietrich of Cleves (c.1216), married Elizabeth of Brabant
- Margaretha of Cleves (c.1218), married Otto II of Guelders

Secondly, he married Hedwig of Meissen (d. 1249), daughter of Theodoric I, Margrave of Meissen. Their children were:

- A first son who died young
- Dietrich VI of Cleves (1245–75), married Adelaide of Heinsberg
- Dietrich Luf I of Cleves (1247–77)
- Agnes of Cleves (c. 1230), married Bernard IV, Lord of Lippe
- Jutta of Cleves (c. 1232), married Waleran IV, Duke of Limburg

== Sources ==
- Maier, Christoph T. (1994). Preaching the Crusades: Mendicant Friars and the Cross in the Thirteenth Century. Cambridge University Press.
- Pollock, M. A. (2015). Scotland, England and France After the Loss of Normandy, 1204-1296: "Auld Amitie". The Boydell Press.

Preceded by Arnold II	Count of Cleves; 1201–1260	Succeeded by Dietrich VI
