= Maria van Arkel =

- Coat of arms of the House of Arkel
- Born: c. 1385
- Died: 19 July 1415
- Noble family: House of Arkel
- Spouse: John II, Count of Egmond
- Issue: Arnold, Duke of Guelders; William IV, Lord of Egmont
- Father: John V, Lord of Arkel
- Mother: Joanna of Jülich

Maria van Arkel (c. 1385 – 19 July 1415) was the only daughter and heiress of Lord John V of Arkel and Joanna of Jülich. She inherited the title to Gelderland from her maternal uncle, Duke Reginald IV, and her son became Arnold, Duke of Gelderland. She was the paternal grandmother of Mary of Guelders, who became Queen of Scots.

== Family ==
Her maternal grandparents were William II, Duke of Jülich and Maria of Guelders, daughter of Reginald II of Guelders and his first wife, Sophia Berthout of Mechelen. Her maternal uncle was William I of Guelders and Jülich.

Her father, John of Arkel (died 25 August 1428), was the son of Otto of Arkel and Isabelle de Bar, daughter of Theobald de Bar, seigneur de Pierrepont. John of Arkel was the "dearest foe" of William II, Duke of Bavaria.

== Marriage ==
Duke Reginald of Guelders, her uncle, arranged the marriage between the beautiful Maria of Arkel and the Hollander noble, John of Egmond. They were married on 24 June 1409. Their children were:

1. Arnold of Egmond, Duke of Guelders
2. William II Lord of Egmont and IJsselstein, stadtholder of Guelders

== Ancestry ==
Ancestors of Maria van Arkel

16. Jan III van Arkel
8. John IV, Lord of Arkel
17. Mabilia van Voorne
4. Otto, Lord of Arkel
18. Otto of Cleves; (son of Dietrich VII, Count of Cleves)
9. Irmgard of Cleves
19. Mechtild (Matilda) of Virneburg
2. John V, Lord of Arkel
20. Erard de Bar, seigneur de Pierrepont; (son of Theobald II of Bar)
10. Theobald de Bar, seigneur de Pierrepont
21. Isabelle of Lorraine; (daughter of Theobald II, Duke of Lorraine)
5. Isabelle de Bar
22. John I, Marquis of Namur
11. Marie de Dampierre of Namur
23. Marie of Artois; (daughter of Philip of Artois)
1. Maria van Arkel
24. Gerhard V of Jülich
12. William I of Jülich
25. Elisabeth of Brabant-Aarschot
6. William II, Duke of Jülich
26. William I, Count of Hainaut
13. Joanna of Hainaut
27. Joan of Valois
3. Joanna of Jülich
28. Reginald I of Guelders
14. Reginald II of Guelders
29. Marguerite of Flanders; (daughter of Guy of Dampierre)
7. Maria of Guelders
30. Florenz Berthout, Count of Mechelen
15. Sophia Berthout of Mechelen
31. Mechtild (Matilda) de la Mark

== Sources ==
- Blok, Petrus Johannes. History of the People of the Netherlands: From the beginning of the fifteenth century to 1559. G.P. Putnam's sons: 1899.
