= Otto, Count of Cleves =

Count of Cleves (1305-1310)

- Born: c. 1278
- Died: 29 October 1310; Horstmar
- Noble family: House of Cleves
- Spouse: Mechteld von Virneburg
- Issue: Irmgard of Cleves
- Father: Dietrich VII, Count of Cleves
- Mother: Margaret of Guelders

Otto (1278 – October 29, 1310) was Count of Cleves from 1305 through 1310.

Otto was the eldest son of Dietrich VII, Count of Cleves (1256–1305) and his first wife Margaret of Guelders.

His first marriage was to Adelheid van der Marck, daughter of Engelbert I, Count of the Mark.

Later he married Mechteld von Virneburg, a niece of Heinrich II of Virneburg. They had one daughter Irmgard of Cleves, who married Adolph II of the Marck and later John IV of Arkel.

When he died, at Horstmar, in 1310 he was succeeded by his half-brother Dietrich VIII.

Preceded by Dietrich VII	Count of Cleves; 1305–1310	Succeeded by Dietrich VIII
