= Robert de Levie =

Dutch chemist

Robert de Levie (born 1933) is a Dutch chemist. He was a professor of analytical chemistry and electrochemistry at Georgetown University.

De Levie was born in Amsterdam. He obtained his PhD in chemistry at the University of Amsterdam under professor Jan Ketelaar in 1963 with a thesis titled: "On porous electrodes in electrolyte solutions". Afterwards he was a postdoc at Louisiana State University for two years. De Levie then moved to Georgetown University where would work in teaching capacity for the next 34 years, including as professor of analytical and electrochemistry.

De Levie was elected a corresponding member of the Royal Netherlands Academy of Arts and Sciences in 1980.
