= Jan Ketelaar =

Dutch chemist (1908–2001)

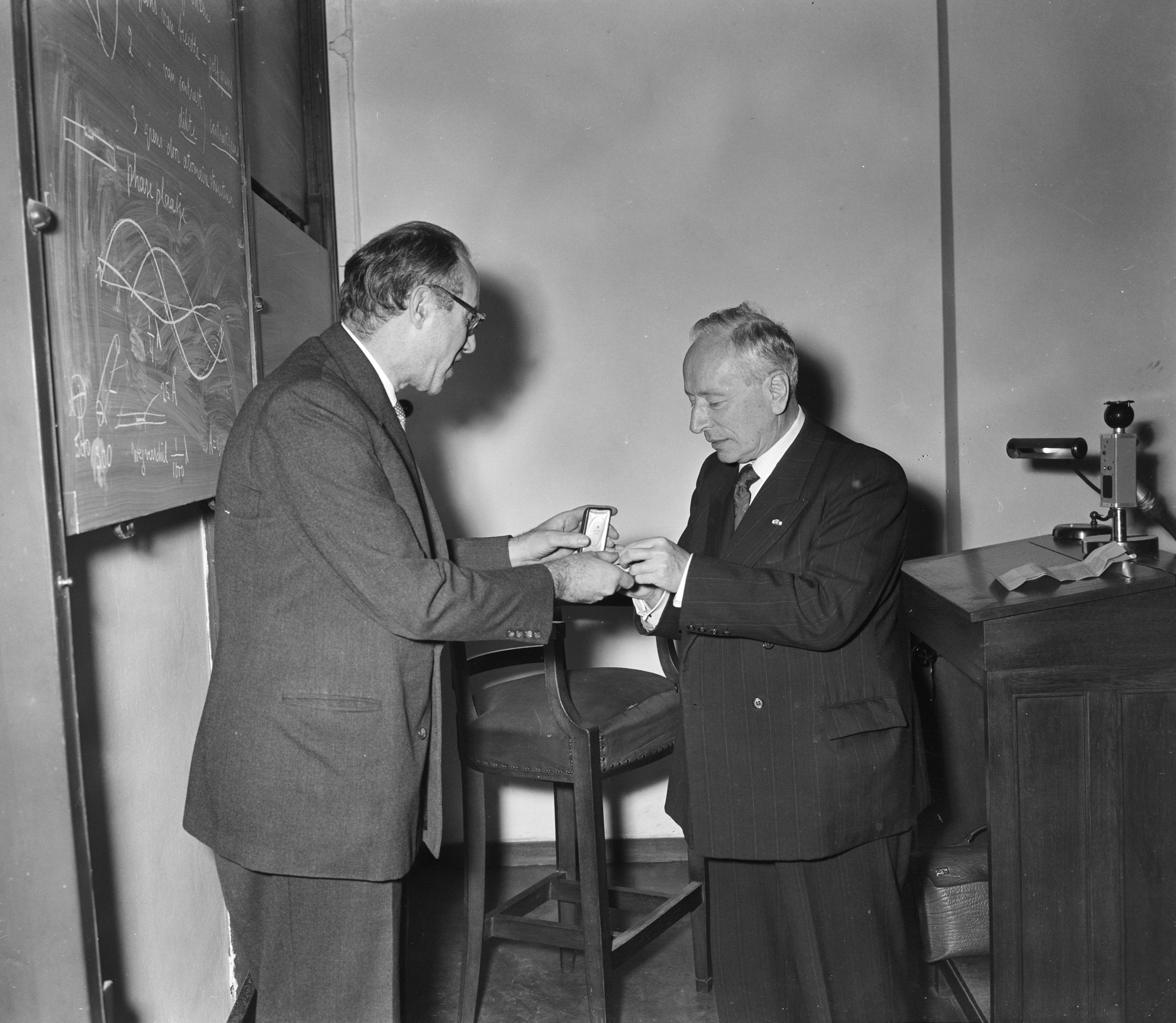
Ketelaar(left) with Frits Zernike, November 1955.

Jan Arnold Albert Ketelaar (21 April 1908, Amsterdam – 23 November 2001, Lochem) was a Dutch chemist and author of the textbook Chemical Constitution: an Introduction to the Theory of the Chemical Bond (De chemische binding. Inleiding in de theoretische chemie). Van Arkel–Ketelaar triangles are named after him.

Ketelaar's doctoral students included Sol Kimel and Robert de Levie. He was elected a member of the Royal Netherlands Academy of Arts and Sciences in 1958.
