= Sol Kimel =

Israeli chemical physicist (1928–2021)

Salo "Sol" Kimel (Hebrew: סול קימל; 7 October 1928 – 14 August 2021) was an Israeli chemical physicist. He was a professor at Technion – Israel Institute of Technology between 1977 and 1997 and performed research into biomedical applications of lasers.

== Biography ==
Kimel was born on 7 October 1928 in Berlin, Brandenburg, Prussia, Germany. His mother was Eva-Kimel Goldberg. His parents split in 1930 and Kimel together with his mother moved in with her sister and her family in Amsterdam, the Netherlands, while his father remained in Berlin. After being in kindergarten for two years he attended a Montessori school for six years. During his childhood in Amsterdam he was friends with Anne Frank. In November 1942, his mother was taken in a Nazi razzia and sent to Sobibor extermination camp where she died. Kimel and his family subsequently went into hiding on a farm. In early 1945 the farm was raided by Nazi authorities, the farmer and Kimel's uncle were killed, and Kimel was sent to Westerbork transit camp where he remained until the liberation of the camp on 12 April 1945.

After the war Kimel studied science in Amsterdam and also became active in Habonim. In 1955 Kimel started working at the Weizmann Institute of Science. The next year he returned to the Netherlands and married Bianca Blaugrund-Alefrant. One year later they moved to Israel. In 1960 he obtained his PhD in physics from the University of Amsterdam under professor Jan Ketelaar with a thesis titled: "Optical dispersion of gases in the infrared region : the dispersion through the first overtone band of HCI". The next two years he was a post-doc at Princeton University. Afterwards he became a research scienstist at the Weizmann Institute. Kimel subsequently started working at the Technion – Israel Institute of Technology and after a spell as associate professor he became full professor in 1977. He retired in 1997.

Kimel was elected a corresponding member of the Royal Netherlands Academy of Arts and Sciences in 1989. In 1994 he was interviewed by David A. Slavkin of the Anti-Defamation League of Orange County, California on his history as a survivor of the Holocaust, the files were copied to the United States Holocaust Memorial Museum in 2000.

Kimel died in Haifa on 14 August 2021 at the age 92. A memorial endowment was set up in his name at the Beckman Laser Institute.
