= Dietrich VIII =

Dietrich VIII, Count of Cleves
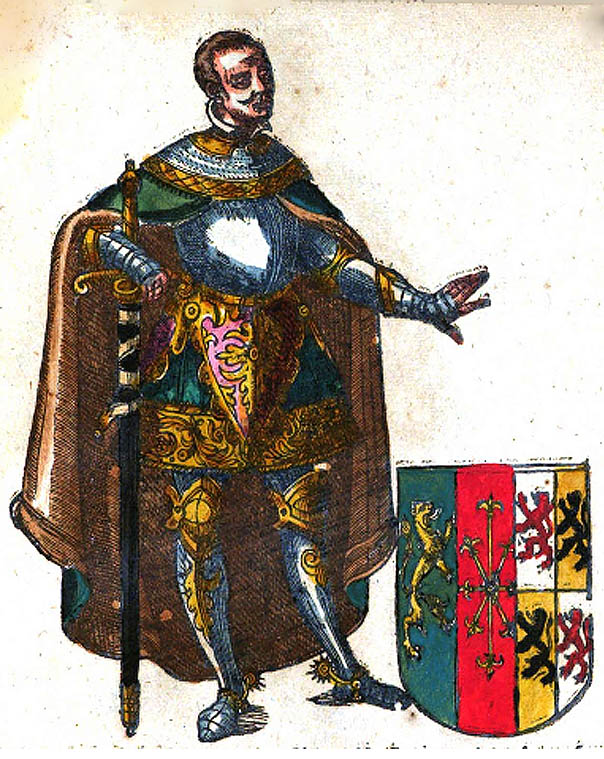
- Born: c. 1291
- Died: 7 July 1347
- Noble family: House of Cleves
- Spouses: Margaret of Guelders; Maria of Jülich
- Issue: Margaret of Cleves, Countess of the Marck; Elisabeth; Maria
- Father: Dietrich VII, Count of Cleves
- Mother: Margaret of Habsburg

Dietrich VIII (c. 1291 – 7 July 1347) was Count of Cleves from 1310 until his death in 1347.

Dietrich was the son of Dietrich VII, Count of Cleves and his second wife Margaret of Habsburg. He succeeded in 1310 his half-brother Otto, Count of Cleves who had died without sons.

Dietrich VIII married twice:

- Margaret of Guelders († 1333), daughter of Reginald I of Guelders, in 1308. They had two daughters:
  - Margaret († 1341), married in 1332 Adolph II of the Marck († 1347), had issue.
  - Elisabeth (1307–1382), married Gerard of Voorne and Otto II of Hesse.
- Maria of Jülich († 1353), daughter of Gerhard V of Jülich, in 1340. They had another daughter:
  - Maria, unmarried, no issue

He was succeeded by his brother John.
When his brother also died without a son, the County of Cleves went to his daughter's son Adolph III of the Marck and so to the Counts of Marck.

Dietrich VIII House of Cleves Born: c. 1291 Died: 7 July 1347
Preceded by Otto	Count of Cleves; 1310–1347	Succeeded by Johann
