= Achterdijk, Vijfheerenlanden =

Achterdijk
- Hamlet
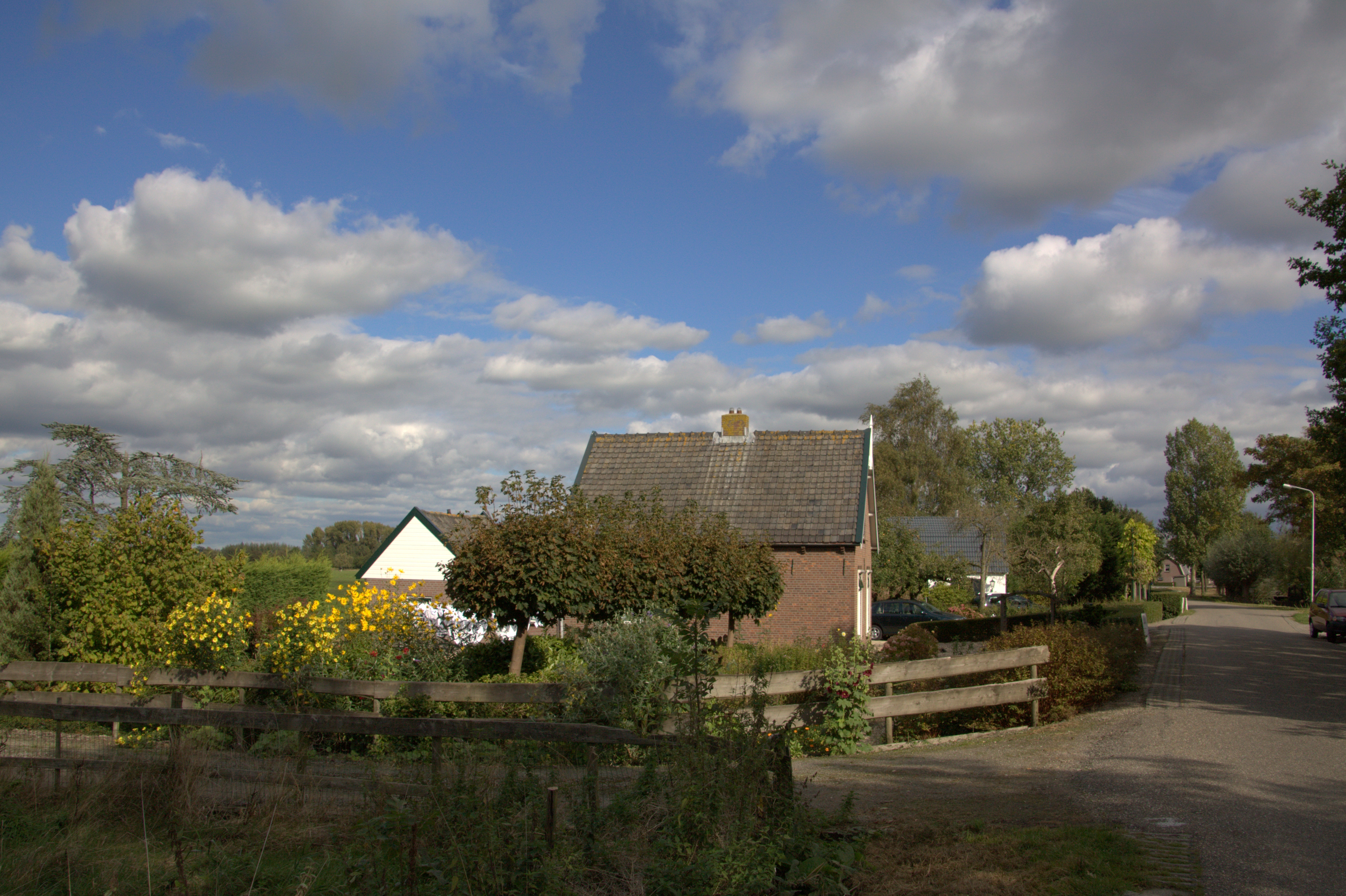
- View on Achterdijk

- Location in the Netherlands Achterdijk (Netherlands)
- Coordinates: 51°53′30″N 5°2′20″E
- Country: Netherlands
- Province: Utrecht
- Municipality: Vijfheerenlanden

Area
  - Total: 2.17 km^{2} (0.84 sq mi)

Population (2021)
  - Total: 195
  - Density: 89.9/km^{2} (233/sq mi)
- Time zone: UTC+1 (CET)
  - Summer (DST): UTC+2 (CEST)
- Postal code: 4243
- Dialing code: 0345

Achterdijk is a hamlet in the Dutch province of Utrecht. It is a part of the municipality of Vijfheerenlanden, and lies about 7 km northeast of Gorinchem.

The name of the hamlet means "Back Dike"; it refers to the dike between Leerdam and Arkel. The hamlet was first mentioned in 1869. Achterdijk has no place name signs, and the postal authorities have placed it under Nieuwland. In 1840, Achterdijk was home to 42 people.

== Gallery ==
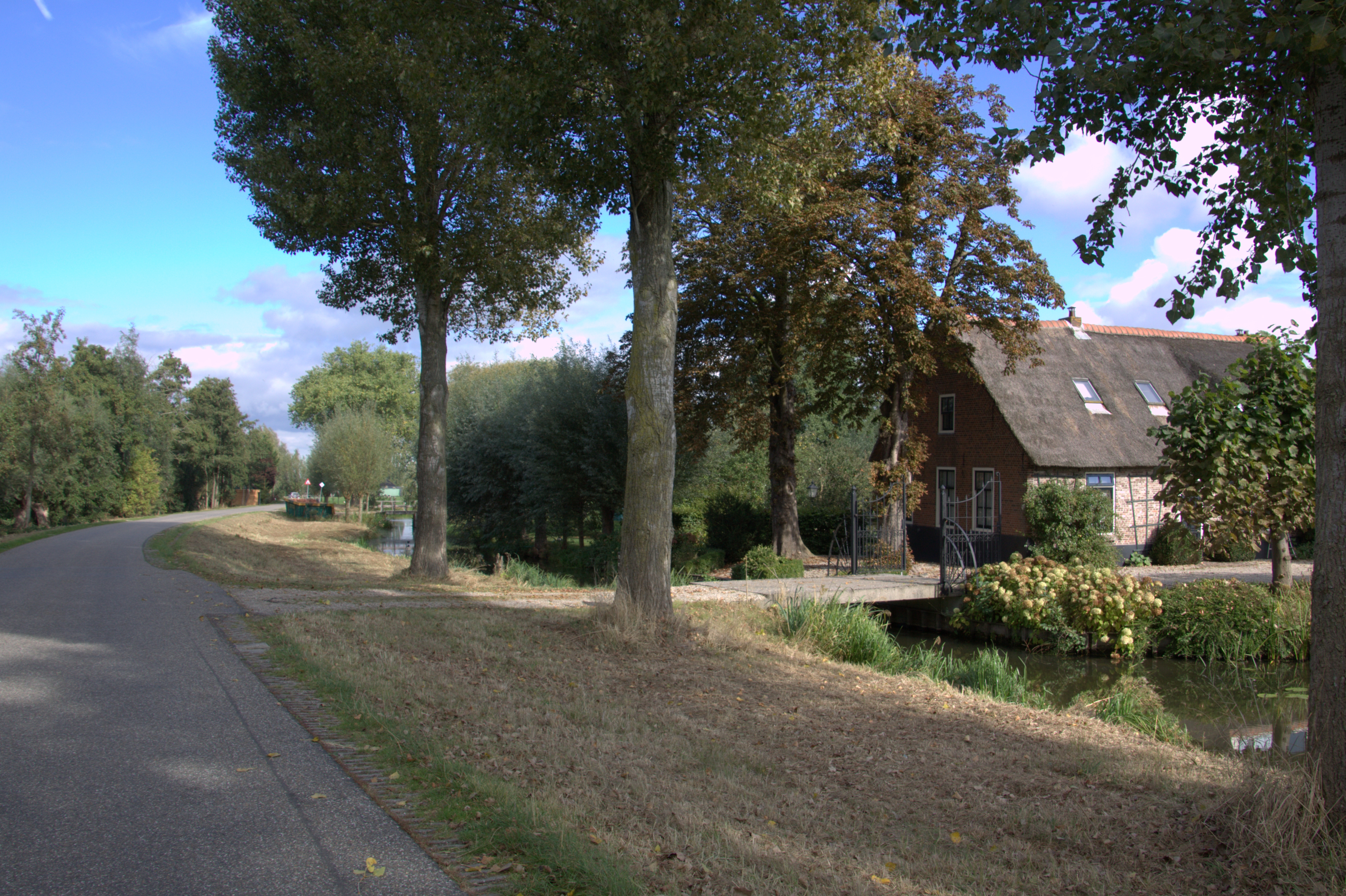
Farm in Achterdijk

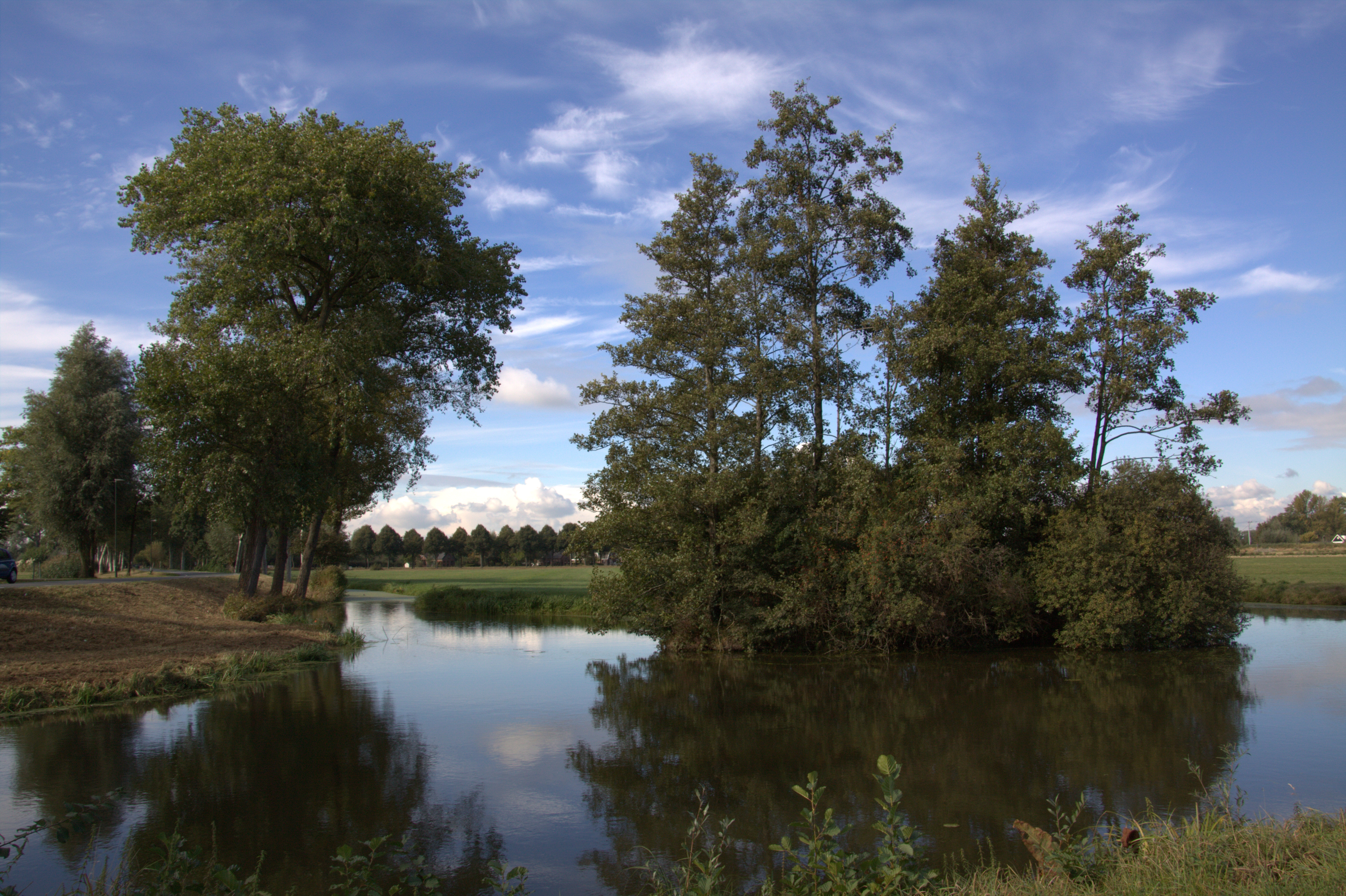
Landscape near Achterdijk
