= John of Cleves =

John of Cleves is the name of:

- John, Count of Cleves (1293-1368), count of Cleves from 1347 to 1368;
- John I, Duke of Cleves, duke of Cleves from 1448 to 1481;
- John II, Duke of Cleves, duke of Cleves from 1481 to 1521;
- John III, Duke of Cleves, duke of Clèves from 1521 to 1539.
