= John IV, Lord of Arkel =

Dutch noble

- Coat of arms of the House of Arkel
- Full name: Jan Herbaren van Arkel
- Died: 5 May 1360
- Noble family: House of Arkel
- Spouse: Irmgard of Cleves
- Issue Detail: Matilda; John; Otto, Lord of Arkel; Elisabeth
- Father: John III, Lord of Arkel
- Mother: Mabelia of Voorne

John IV, Lord of Arkel (also known as Jan Herbaren van Arkel; d. 5 May 1360) was Lord of Arkel from 1326 until his death.

== Life ==
He was the son of John III and his wife, Mabelia of Voorne.

Shortly after his father died, John IV became a councillor at the court of Count William IV of Holland. When his half-brother John was elected Bishop of Utrecht, John IV withdrew from the court. Nevertheless, his influence continued to grow as he acquired more territory. This changed after William IV died during the Battle of Warns in 1345. Tensions between the van Arkel and van Duivenvoorde families increased when William of Duivenvoorde obtained an influential position at the court of Countess Margaret of Holland. John IV then joined the opposing side, which was led by Margaret's son William V.

He supported his half-brother with a loan when he later had a conflict with the Oversticht area. He supported Duke Reginald III of Guelders during the siege of Tiel in 1350. As the conflict between Margaret and William V escalated, John IV continued to support William V. William enfeoffed the Lordships of Haastrecht and of the Lek to John IV.

He created an alliance with Gerard III van Heemskerk, Ghisbert II of Nijenrode and John I of Egmond against Margaret's supporters. This triggered the Hook and Cod wars. John IV played an important role in the early battles during this war. He fought in the Battle of Zwartewaal in 1351 and led the Cod troops during the Siege of Geertruidenberg. In 1355 William V made peace with the Hook faction and forced John IV to give up some of his land. This led to a conflict that lasted until 1359, when John received some new fiefs as compensation.

In 1358, William V was deposed by his brother Albert, who locked up William in the grounds that he had become insane. John IV opposed Albert, preferring that William's wife, Matilda, should become regent. Nevertheless, John IV made peace with Albert shortly afterwards.

John IV died on 5 May 1360, and was succeeded by his son Otto.

== Marriage and issue ==
In 1327, John IV married Irmgard of Cleves, a daughter of Count Otto of Cleves. This marriage brought a lot of prestige for the van Arkel family. William IV addressed John IV as his dear cousin.

John and Irmgard had four children:

- Matilda (1330-1381), married William VI of Horne, Lord of Altena
- John (d. 1352)
- Otto (1332/1334?-d. 1396), married Elisabeth de Bar de Pierremont
- Elisabeth (c. 1335-1407), married Borre of Haamstede

John also had one illegitimate son:

- John of Wolferen (b. c. 1345- d. c. 1423)

John IV, Lord of Arkel House of Arkel
Preceded by John III	Lord of Arkel; 1326–1360	Succeeded by Otto, Lord of Arkel
