= Hoornaar =

- Town
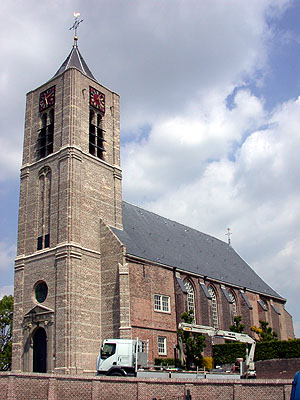
- Kerk

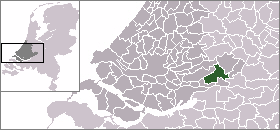

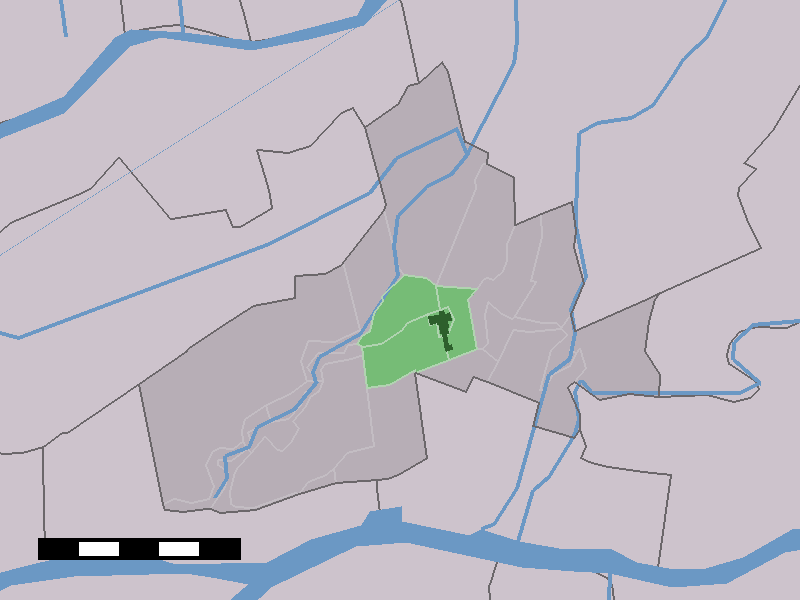
- The town centre (dark green) and the statistical district (light green) of Hoornaar in the former municipality of Giessenlanden.
- Coordinates: 51°52′36″N 4°56′49″E
- Country: Netherlands
- Province: South Holland
- Municipality: Molenlanden

Population (2007)
  - Total: 1,655
- Time zone: UTC+1 (CET)
  - Summer (DST): UTC+2 (CEST)

Hoornaar is a town in the Dutch province of South Holland, in the Alblasserwaard, north of the river Merwede and south of the river Lek. It is a part of the municipality of Molenlanden, and lies about 5 km north of Gorinchem.

In 2007, the town of Hoornaar had 1655 inhabitants. The built-up area of the town was 0.24 km². The statistical area "Hoornaar", which also can include the peripheral parts of the village, as well as the surrounding countryside, has a population of around 1580.

Hoornaar was a separate municipality between 1817 and 1986, when it became part of Giessenlanden.

The town hall of the municipality Giessenlanden lies within the town's borders. The small rivers Kromme Giessen, Giessen and Kleine Vaart flow through the town.

The name Hoornaar is derived from Hornedamme. A 'Horne' is a curve in a river. Years ago the river Linge joined the river Giessen behind the village of Hoogblokland. There a dam was built and a settlement originated. Because of the existence of so-called donken, which are hills of sand made by glacial sedimentation, and the lack of them elsewhere, it is known that Hoornaar has a long history.

The history of Hoornaar is quiet. There was a raid on the village in 1481. In the 11th century an attack of Gofried of Lotharingen was prohibited by count Dirk III of Holland.

In the 19th century Hoornaar became depended on the harvest of cannabis for its fibers to make rope with. Later on Hoornaar became more depended on potato and beet harvest. Besides stockbreeding, cheese trade and export companies became important to the village economy.
