= Dietrich VI =

Dietrich VI, Count of Cleves
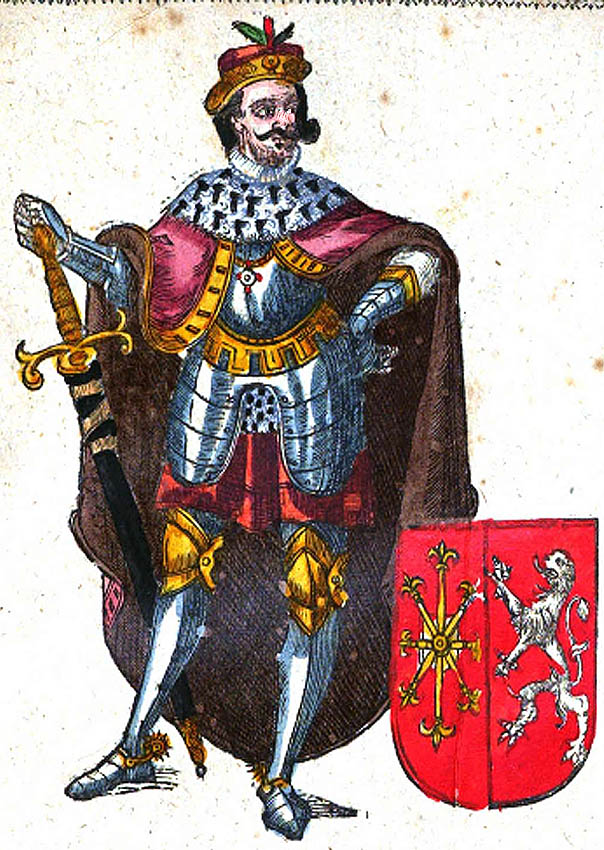
- Born: c. 1226
- Died: 1275
- Noble family: House of Cleves
- Spouse: Alida of Heinsberg
- Issue Detail: Dietrich VII, Count of Cleves; Dietrich von Kleve, Prior of Xanten; Mechtild von Kleve
- Father: Dietrich V, Count of Cleves
- Mother: Hedwig of Meissen

Dietrich VI (died 1275), also known as Dietrich of Meissen (German: von Meißen), was Count of Cleves from 1260 until his death in 1275. He was born in about 1226 as the son of Dietrich V, Count of Cleves and Hedwig of Meissen.

== Marriage and issue ==
Dietrich VI married Alida of Heinsberg (d. 1303), daughter of Henry I of Sponheim and Agnes of Heinsberg. Their children were:

- Dietrich VII, Count of Cleves (1256 – 4 October 1305)
- Dietrich von Kleve, Prior of Xanten (born 1258)
- Mechtild von Kleve (1260 – 21 December 1309), married Henry I, Landgrave of Hesse
- Dietrich Luf II von Kleve, Count of Hülchrath (born 1262)
- Agnes von Kleve (1264–1312)
- Irmgard von Kleve, (1266 – 11 May 1319)

Preceded by Dietrich V	Count of Cleves; 1260–1275	Succeeded by Dietrich VII
