= Irmgard of Cleves =

- Born: c. 1307; Kleve
- Died: 6 August 1362
- Noble family: House of Cleves
- Spouse: John IV, Lord of Arkel
- Issue Detail: Matilda; John; Otto, Lord of Arkel; Elisabeth
- Father: Otto, Count of Cleves
- Mother: Mechteld von Virneburg

Irmgard of Cleves (also known as Irmengard von Kleve) (1307-1362) was the wife of John IV, Lord of Arkel. Born in 1307, she was the only daughter of Otto, Count of Cleves and his wife, Mechteld von Virneburg. Her father, Count Otto died shortly after her birth.

== Marriage and issue ==
In 1327, Irmgard married John IV, Lord of Arkel, the son of John III, Lord of Arkel and his wife, Mabelia of Voorne. The marriage of Irmgard and John brought a lot of prestige for the van Arkel family.

John and Irmgard had four children:

- Matilda (b. 1330- d. 1381), married William VI of Horne, Lord of Altena
- John (b. 1332 - d. 1352)
- Otto (b. 1332/1334 -d. 1396), married Elisabeth de Bar de Pierremont
- Elisabeth (b. 1335- d.1407), married Borre of Haamstede
