= Suzanne Dekker =

Dutch politician (born 1949)

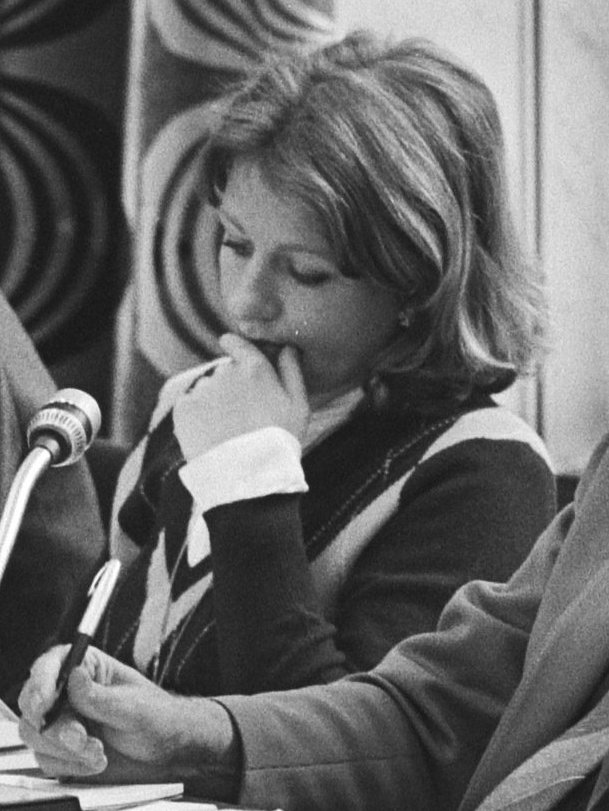
Dekker in 1981

Suzanne Dekker (born 31 October 1949) is a former Dutch politician of Democrats 66 (D66). Born in Amsterdam, she sat as a member of the European Parliament (MEP) from the Netherlands between 1979 and 1981. Dekker also served in the Dutch House of Representatives from 1981 to 1982.
