= John III, Lord of Arkel =

English Lord

- Coat of arms of the House of Arkel
- Born: c. 1275
- Died: 24 December 1324; Gorinchem
- Noble family: House of Arkel
- Spouses: Mabelia of Voorne; Cunegonde of Virneburg
- Issue Detail: John IV, Lord of Arkel; John of Arkel
- Father: John II, Lord of Arkel
- Mother: Bertha van Sterkenburg

John III, Lord of Arkel (c. 1275 – 24 December 1324) was Lord of Arkel from 1297 until his death in 1324.

== Life ==
He was the son of John II, Lord of Arkel and his wife, Bertha van Sterkenburg. He succeeded his father in 1297, after his father died at the battle of Vronen. John III expanded the Arkel lands further and bought lands in Holland and Brabant. He was a counsellor to the bishop of Utrecht, Guy of Avesnes. In 1304, he inherited the lands of Ter Leede as he was the only surviving heir of the Ter Leede lineage.

He was in favor of William I, Count of Hainaut and was appointed judge in 1321 to give a verdict about the differences between William I, Count of Hainaut and John I of Brabant. In later years John III lost his favor of William I, Count of Hainaut to the younger, Willem van Duivenvoorde. In that same year he named his eldest son, Sheriff of Ter Leede. In 1324, that son succeeded him as John IV, Lord of Arkel, previously known as Jan van der Lede.

Jan is buried in Gorinchem, next to his first wife Mabelia of Voorne.

== Marriage and issue ==
John married twice:

His first marriage in 1293, was to Mabelia of Voorne (c. 1273 – 26 February 1313), daughter of Albrecht of Voorne and Aleidis van Loon, with whom he had three children:

- John IV, Lord of Arkel (c. 1305 – 5 May 1360)
- Margaret, died young.
- Mabelia of Arkel (c. 1295 – 13 June 1368), married Gijsbrecht, Lord of Eem (also known as Eemkerk).

In 1310 had John had two illegitimate marriages and thus two illegitimate children:

- Jan de Gruyter (born 1310) from an illegitimate marriage to lady de Gruyter.
- Dirk Alras van Arkel (born 1315) from an illegitimate marriage to lady van Haestrecht.

In 1314, John married a second time, to Cunegonde of Virneburg (1295–1328). Their children were:

- John of Arkel, bishop of Utrecht and Liège (1314–1378)
- Robrecht, Lord of den Berghe and Asperen (1320–1347)
- Cunegonde of Arkel (1321–1346), married John, Lord of Heusden.

John III, Lord of Arkel House of Arkel
Preceded by John II	Lord of Arkel; 1297–1324	Succeeded by John IV, Lord of Arkel
