= Achterdijk, North Brabant =

Coordinates: 51°39′24″N 4°37′10″E

Achterdijk is a hamlet in the Dutch province of North Brabant. It is located in the municipality of Moerdijk, about 2 km northeast of the town of Zevenbergen.

The name of the hamlet means "Back Dike".
