= Anton Eduard van Arkel =

Dutch chemist (1893–1976)

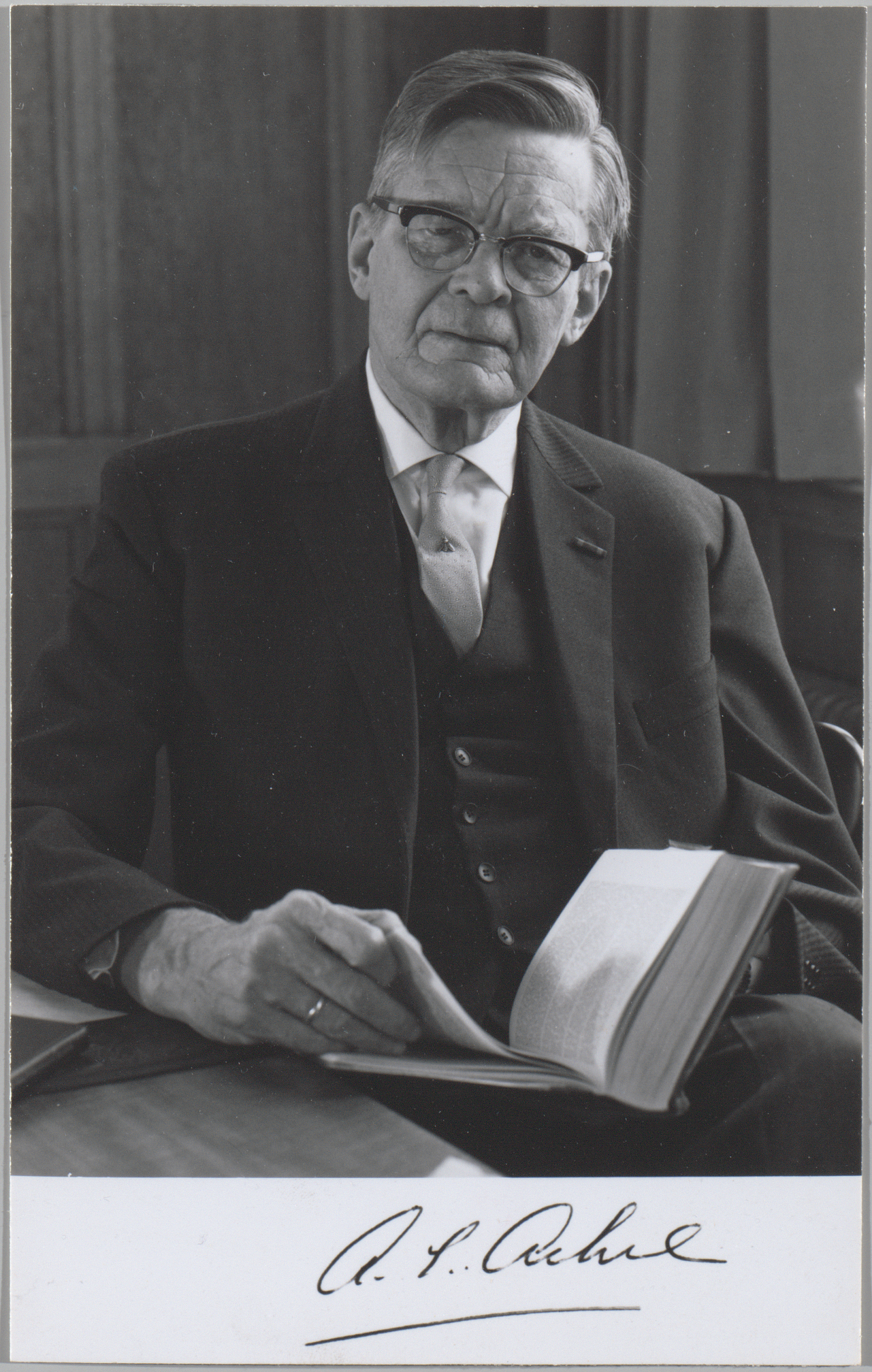
- Born: 19 November 1893 's-Gravenzande, Netherlands
- Died: 14 March 1976 (aged 82); Leiden, Netherlands
- Known for: Van Arkel–de Boer process Van Arkel–Ketelaar triangle Coining pnictogen and pnictide
- Scientific career
- Fields: Chemistry

Anton Eduard van Arkel (19 November 1893 – 14 March 1976) was a Dutch chemist.

== Biography ==
In the early 1920s Van Arkel, together with Jan Hendrik de Boer, working for Philips NV, developed the Van Arkel–de Boer process for the preparation of pure titanium: the decomposition of the vapor of titanium tetrachloride on an incandescent tungsten filament. This method was later used for other metals, including zirconium and hafnium.

In 1941 he published the Van Arkel–Ketelaar triangle, a diagrammatic method to depict the chemical bonds that would form between elements in the periodic table.

Van Arkel suggested the names "pnictogen" and "pnictide" to refer to chemical elements in group 15 (the nitrogen group or nitrogen family) of the periodic table.

In 1962 Van Arkel became member of the Royal Netherlands Academy of Arts and Sciences.

Van Arkel published at least one textbook, Molecules and Crystals, in 1941 in his native language. In 1949 this work was translated to English.

== See also ==
- Hafnium
- Titanium
