= Nikola Dekleva =

Serbian surgeon and academic (1926–2003)

Dr. Nikola Dekleva (19 December 1926, Leskovac – 31 December 2003, Dobrota near Kotor) was a Serbian surgeon, professor of medicine, creator of hiperbaric medicine in Serbia, and a recognized expert inside and outside the borders of Yugoslavia. He was also the founder and director of the Center for Hyperbaric Medicine at the Clinical Center "Zemun", in 1974.

== Early life and education ==
Nikola Dekleva came from a medical family. His father Dušan Dekleva hailing from the Slovene town of Vipava was a famous physician and surgeon, and at the time of Nikola's birth, he was the head of Surgery Department of the Hospital in Leskovac.

Nikola Dekleva graduated from School of Medicine in Belgrade, and then specialized in surgery.
