= Van Arkel–Ketelaar triangle =

A triangle showing varying degrees of ionic, metallic and covalent bonding

A Van Arkel–Ketelaar triangle

Bond triangles or Van Arkel–Ketelaar triangles (named after Anton Eduard van Arkel and J. A. A. Ketelaar) are triangles used for showing different compounds in varying degrees of ionic, metallic and covalent bonding.

== History ==
In 1941 Van Arkel recognised three extreme materials and associated bonding types. Using 36 main group elements, such as metals, metalloids and non-metals, he placed ionic, metallic and covalent bonds on the corners of an equilateral triangle, as well as suggested intermediate species. The bond triangle shows that chemical bonds are not just particular bonds of a specific type. Rather, bond types are interconnected and different compounds have varying degrees of different bonding character (for example, covalent bonds with significant ionic character are called polar covalent bonds).

Six years later, in 1947, Ketelaar developed van Arkel's idea by adding more compounds and placing bonds on different sides of the triangle.

Many people developed the triangle idea. Some (e.g. Allen's quantitative triangle) used electron configuration energy as an atom parameter, others (Jensen's quantitative triangle, Norman's quantitative triangle) used electronegativity of compounds. Nowadays, electronegativity triangles are mostly used to rate the chemical bond type.

== Usage ==
Different compounds that obey the octet rule (sp-elements) and hydrogen can be placed on the triangle. Unfortunately, d-elements cannot be analysed using van Arkel-Ketelaar triangle, as their electronegativity is so high that it is taken as a constant. Using electronegativity - two compound average electronegativity on x-axis and electronegativity difference on y-axis, we can rate the dominant bond between the compounds. Example is here

On the right side (from ionic to covalent) should be compounds with varying difference in electronegativity. The compounds with equal electronegativity, such as Cl_{2} (chlorine) are placed in the covalent corner, while the ionic corner has compounds with large electronegativity difference, such as NaCl (table salt). The bottom side (from metallic to covalent) contains compounds with varying degree of directionality in the bond.

At one extreme is metallic bonds with delocalized bonding and the other are covalent bonds in which the orbitals overlap in a particular direction. The left side (from ionic to metallic) is meant for delocalized bonds with varying electronegativity difference.

== See also ==
- Covalent bonding
- Ionic bonding
- Metallic bonding
- Atomic orbitals
- Hund's rules
- Ternary plot
