= Schelluinen =

- Village
- Flag Coat of arms

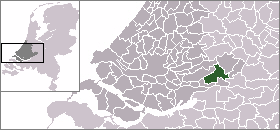

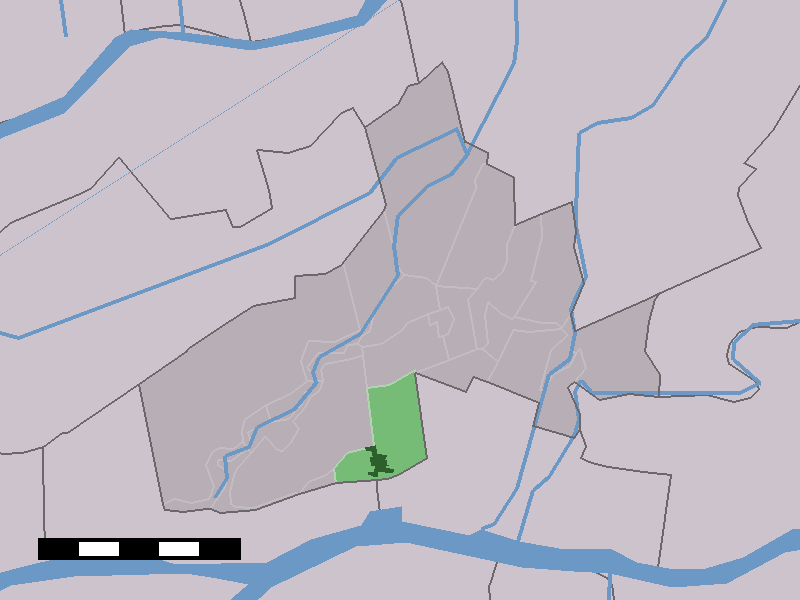
- The village centre (dark green) and the statistical district (light green) of Schelluinen in the municipality of Giessenlanden.
- Coordinates: 51°50′33″N 4°55′33″E
- Country: Netherlands
- Province: South Holland
- Municipality: Molenlanden
- Established: 1220

Population (2017)
  - Total: 1,480
- Time zone: UTC+1 (CET)
  - Summer (DST): UTC+2 (CEST)

Schelluinen (Dutch pronunciation: [sxɛˈlœynə(n)]) is a village in the Dutch province of South Holland. It is a part of the municipality of Molenlanden, and lies about 4 km west of Gorinchem.

In 2017, the village of Schelluinen had 1,426 inhabitants. The built-up area of the village was 0.23 km^{2}, and contained 342 residences. The statistical area "Schelluinen", which can include the peripheral parts of the village, as well as the surrounding countryside, has a population of around 1240.

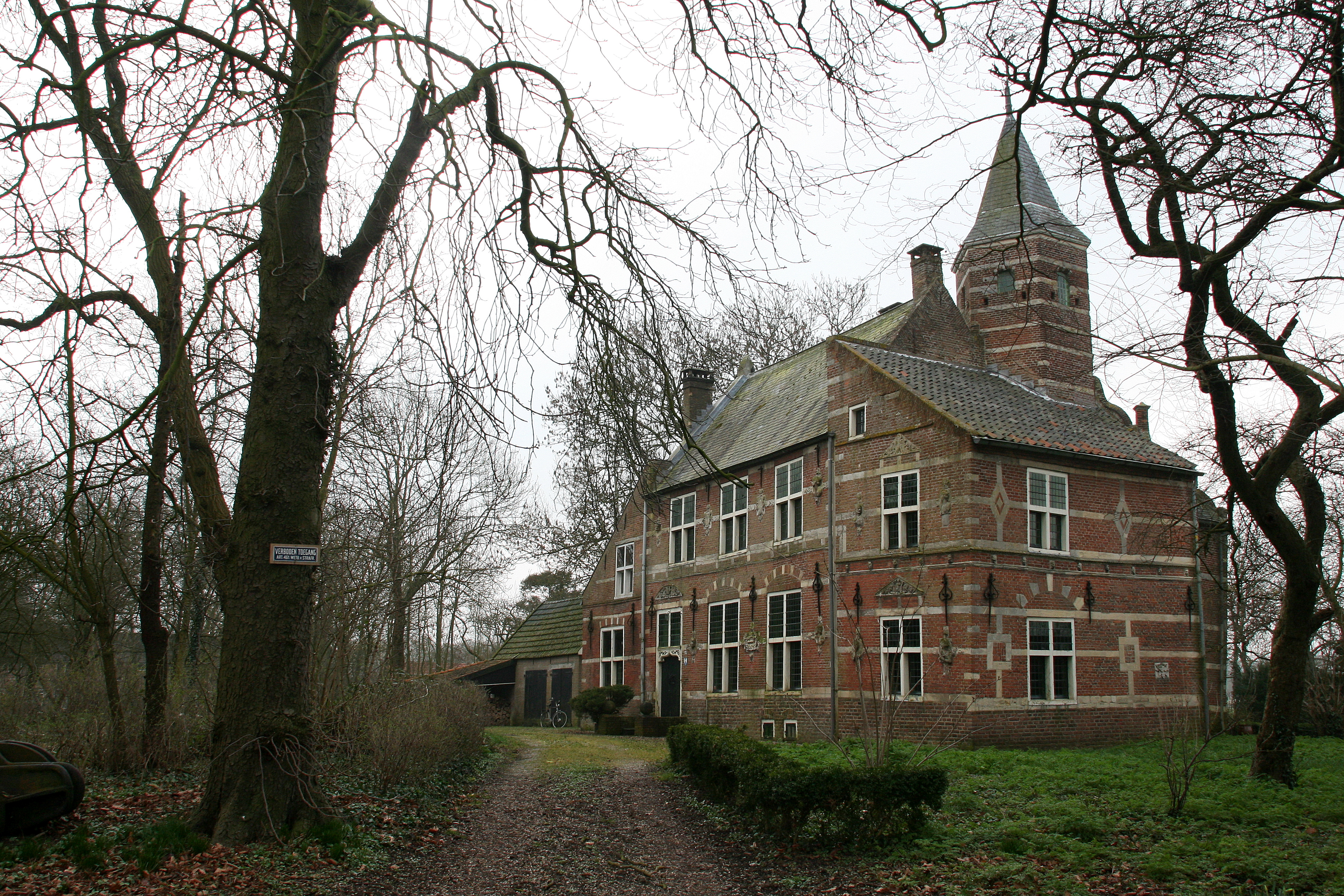
Castle in Schelluinen

Schelluinen was a separate municipality between 1817 and 1986, when it became part of Giessenlanden, which in 2019 merged into Molenlanden.

== General ==
Schelluinen lies near the N216 and has a public elementary school called Het Tweespan. The village has a playground, petting zoo, tennis, skating and gym association. The local football club is VV Schelluinen. There is also a branch of the CBR located in the village.
