= Dietrich VII =

German noble (1256–1305)

Dietrich VII, Count of Cleves
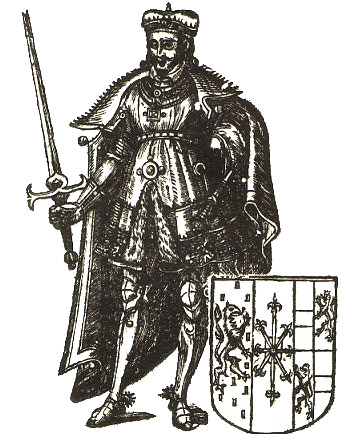
- Born: 1256
- Died: 1305 (aged 48–49)
- Noble family: House of Cleves
- Spouses: Margaret of Guelders; Margaret of Habsburg-Kilburg
- Issue Detail: Otto, Count of Cleves; Catharine; Adelheid; Dietrich VIII, Count of Cleves; Johann, Count of Cleves; Margaret; Irmgard
- Father: Dietrich VI, Count of Cleves
- Mother: Aleidis von Heinsberg

Dietrich VII (1256–1305) was Count of Cleves from 1275 through 1305. He was the son of Dietrich VI, Count of Cleves and his wife Aleidis von Heinsberg. Dietrich adopted the strategy used in Holland, in the county of Cleves, methodically reclaiming territory with dikes and settling new residents.

== Marriage and issue ==
In 1260, Dietrich married Margaret of Guelders (d. 1281), daughter of Otto II, Count of Guelders. They had three children:

- Otto, Count of Cleves (1278–1310)
- Catharine, nun at Gräfenthal (1280-1357)
- Adelheid, married Henry IV, Count of Waldeck (d. 1348)

His second marriage was to Margaret of Habsburg-Kilburg, daughter of Everhard I of Kiburg-Laufenburg. Their children were:

- Dietrich VIII, Count of Cleves (1291–1347)
- Johann, Count of Cleves (1293–1368).
- Margaret, married Henry of Lodi, son of Guy, Count of Flanders (d. 1337)
- Irmgard, married Gerhard I of Horn, Count of Altena (1297-1350)
- Agnes (d. 1361), married in 1312 Count Adolf IX of Berg (d. 1348)
- Maria, nun in Bedburg (1302-1347)
- Eberhard (1303-1312)
- Anna (d. 1378), married Godfrey IV of Cuyck-Arnsberg (d. 1371)

== Sources ==
- Margue, Michel; Pauly, Michel (2017). "The territorial principalities of Lotharingia". In Loud, Graham A.; Schenk, Jochen (eds.). The Origins of the German Principalities, 1100-1350: Essays by German Historians. Routledge.

Preceded by Dietrich VI	Count of Cleves; 1275–1305	Succeeded by Otto
