= Arkel =

- Town
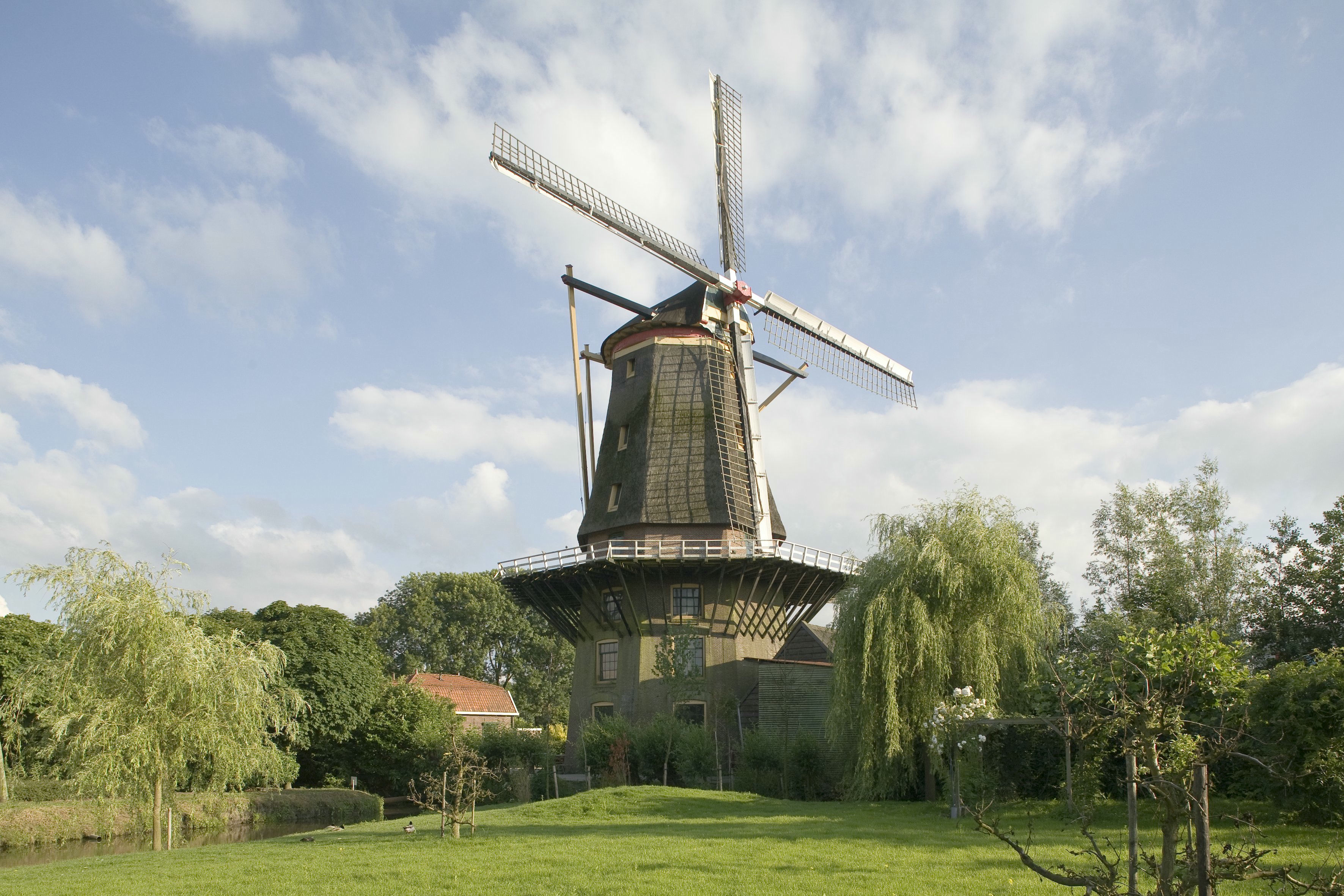
- Windmill in Arkel

- Flag Coat of arms

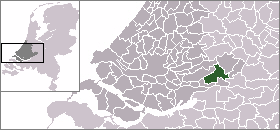

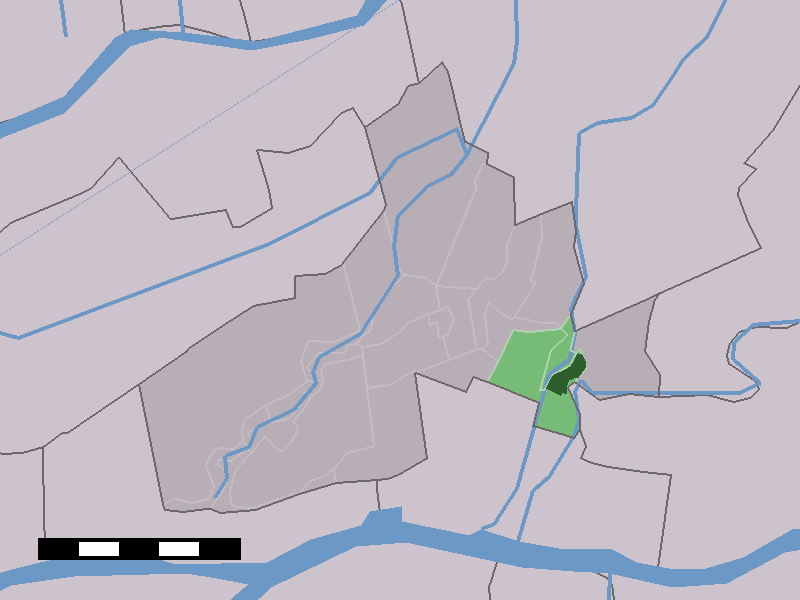
- The village (dark green) and the statistical district (light green) of Arkel in the municipality of Giessenlanden.
- Coordinates: 51°51′50″N 4°59′40″E
- Country: Netherlands
- Province: South Holland
- Municipality: Molenlanden

Population (2017)
  - Total: 3,445
- Time zone: UTC+1 (CET)
  - Summer (DST): UTC+2 (CEST)

Arkel is a town in the province of South Holland, Netherlands. A part of the municipality of Molenlanden, it lies about 3 km north of Gorinchem. Arkel is a former municipality; in 1986 it became part of Giessenlanden.

In 2017, the village of Arkel had 3.445 inhabitants. The built-up area of the village was 0.42 km² and contained 1.125 residences. The statistical area "Arkel", which also includes the surrounding countryside, has a population of around 3220. Though there are little places of cultural interest in Arkel, there is a 19th-century domed church and a 19th-century windmill.

== History ==
Although nowadays a modest village, in the Middle Ages it was the origin of the renowned Lords of Arkel, who owned considerable territories including the town of Gorinchem.

== Transportation ==
Arkel is served by Arkel railway station. It is located north of the town.
