= Haastrecht =

- City
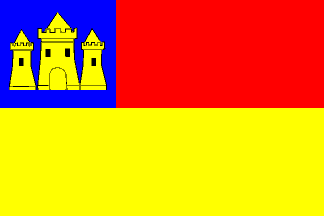
- Flag Coat of arms

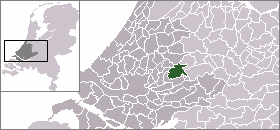

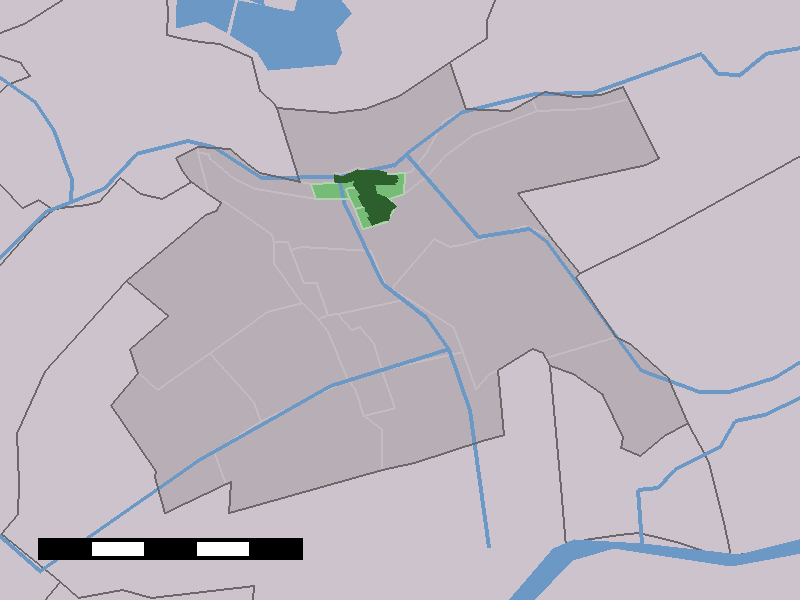
- The town centre (dark green) and the statistical district (light green) of Haastrecht in the former municipality of Vlist.
- Coordinates: 52°0′N 4°46′E
- Country: Netherlands
- Province: South Holland
- Municipality: Krimpenerwaard

Population
  - Total: 4,500
- Time zone: UTC+1 (CET)
  - Summer (DST): UTC+2 (CEST)

Haastrecht is a small city on the Hollandse IJssel river in the Dutch province of South Holland. It is a part of the municipality of Krimpenerwaard, and lies about 5 km east of Gouda.

In 2001, the city of Haastrecht had 3302 inhabitants. The built-up area of the town was 0.58 km², and contained 1325 residences. The statistical area "Haastrecht", which also can include the peripheral parts of the village, as well as the surrounding countryside, has a population of around 2330.

Haastrecht received town rights in 1396. It remained a separate municipality until 1985, when it became part of Vlist.

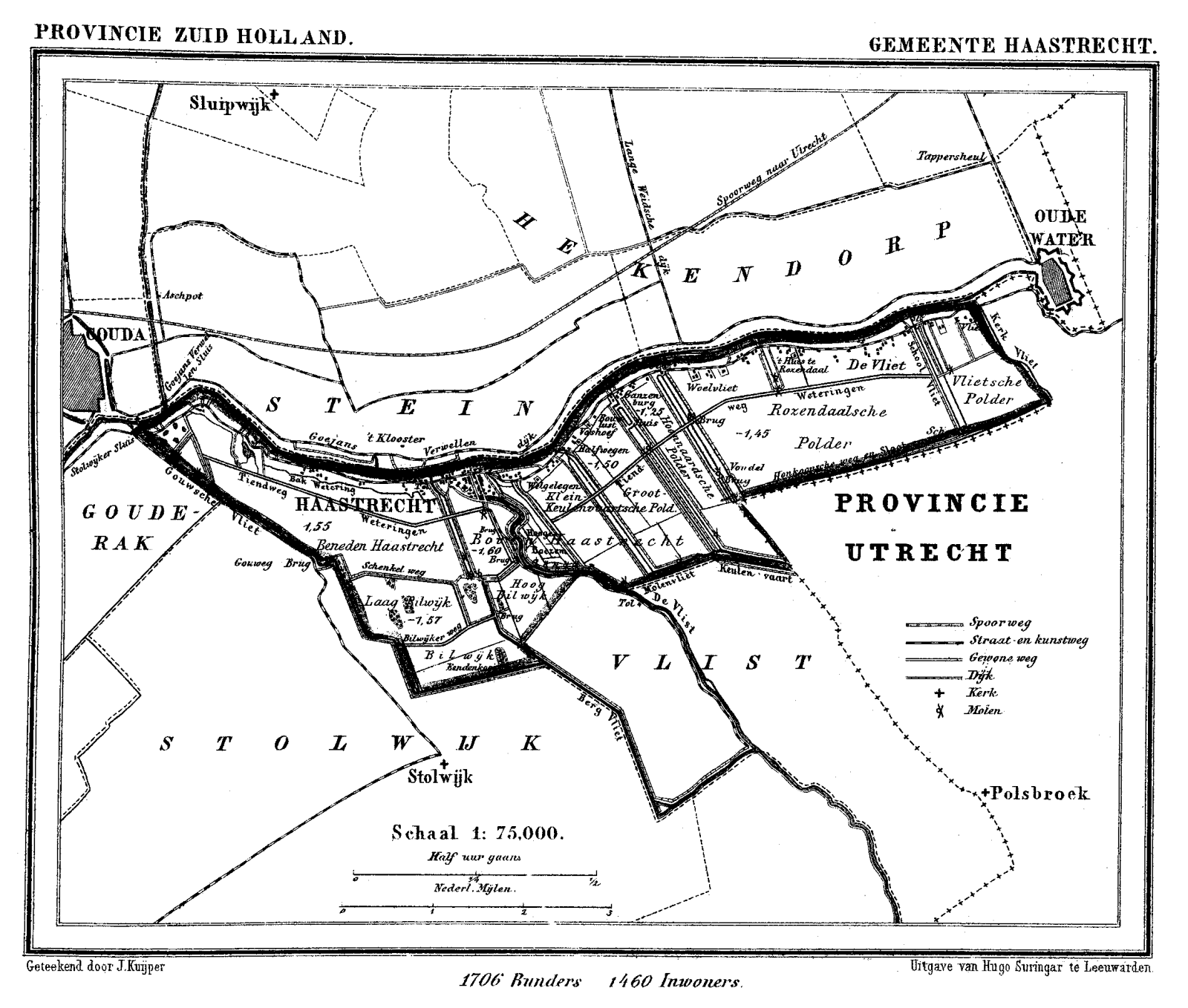
Haastrecht in 1868

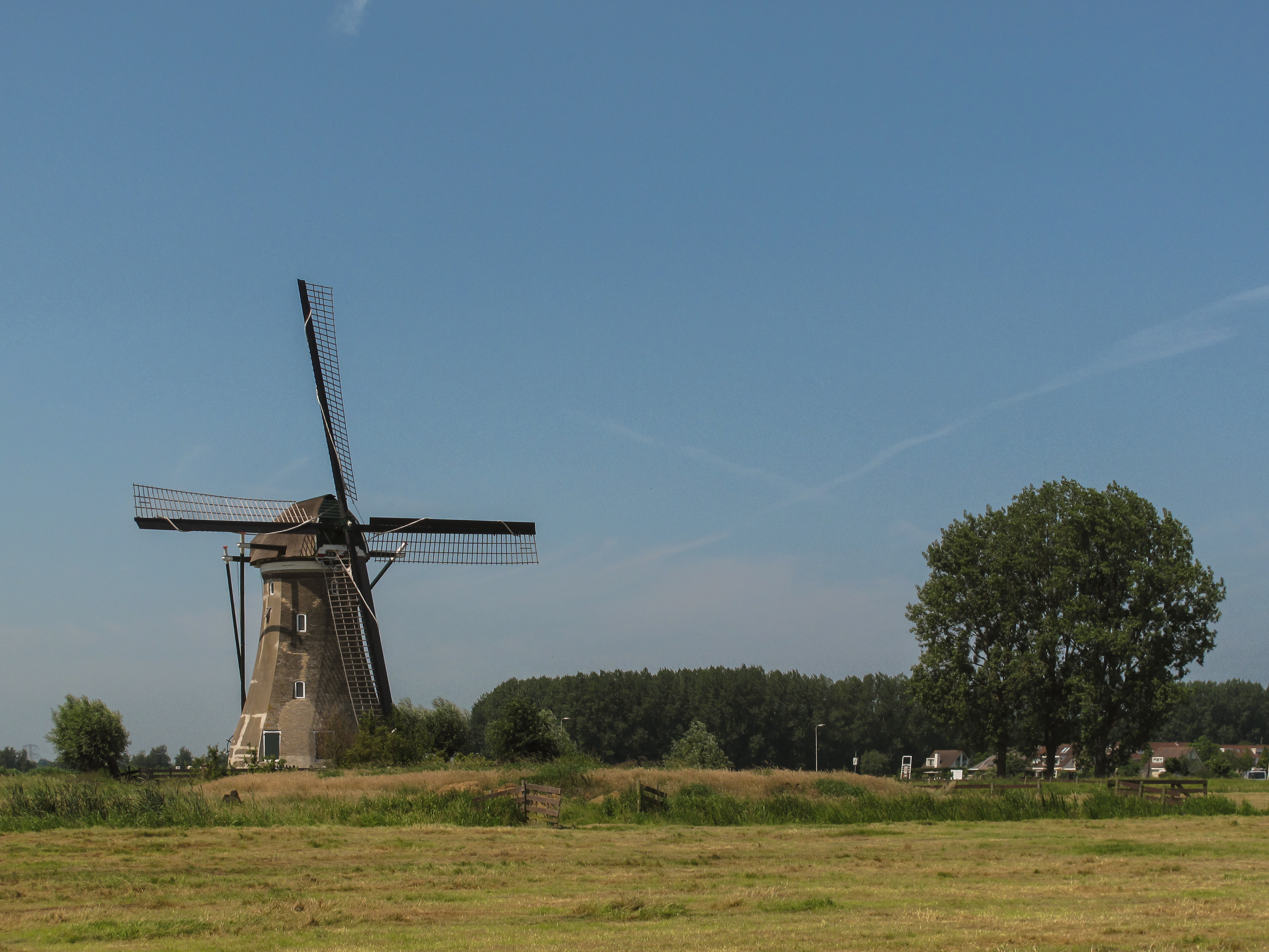
Haastrecht, windmill: boezemmolen nummer 6
