= Hagestein =

- Village
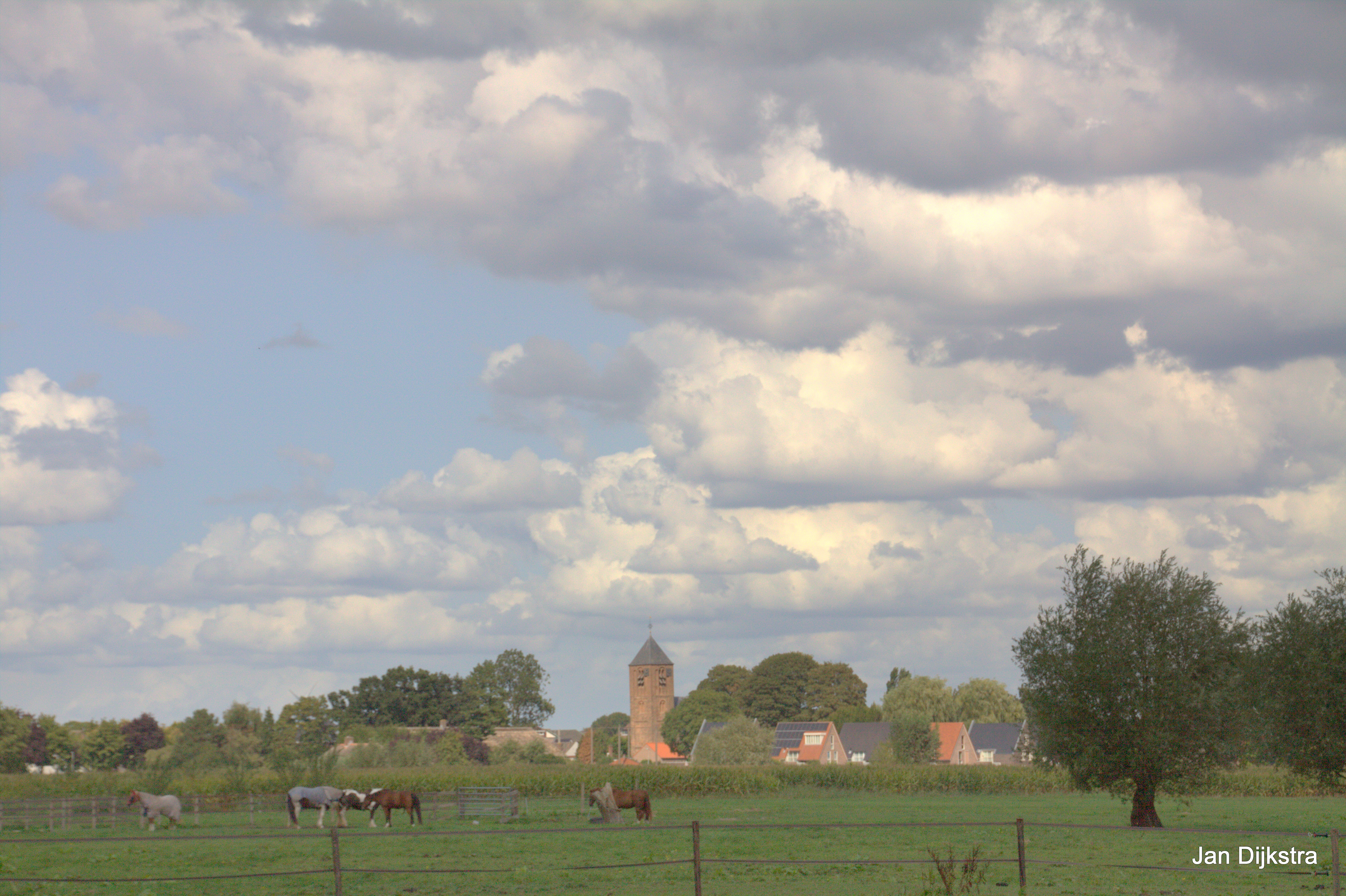
- View on Hagestein

- Coat of arms

- Location in the Netherlands Hagestein (Netherlands)
- Coordinates: 51°58′47″N 5°7′14″E
- Country: Netherlands
- Province: Utrecht
- Municipality: Vijfheerenlanden

Area
  - Total: 8.03 km^{2} (3.10 sq mi)
- Elevation: 3 m (9.8 ft)

Population (2021)
  - Total: 1,460
  - Density: 182/km^{2} (471/sq mi)
- Time zone: UTC+1 (CET)
  - Summer (DST): UTC+2 (CEST)
- Postal code: 4124
- Dialing code: 0347

Hagestein is a village and former city in the municipality of Vijfheerenlanden, Utrecht, Netherlands, on the Lek River, about 2 km east of Vianen. It received city rights in 1382. Hagestein was destroyed in 1405 by the Count of Holland and the Prince-Bishop of Utrecht.

Hagestein was a separate municipality between 1818 and 1986, when it merged with Vianen. Until 2002, it was a part of the province of South Holland.

== History ==
It was first mentioned in 1228 as Gaspewerde which meant land on the river Gaasp. In 1274 it was known as Hagesteine meaning "fenced off terrain around a stone building". Hagestein developed along the Lek River. Around 1250, Castle Hagestein was built. In 1382, it received city rights from Otto van Arkel. Neighbouring Vianen felt threatened by the new city, and in 1405, Hagestein was taken by the Count of Holland and the Prince-Bishop of Utrecht who destroyed the entire settlement. Holland was grateful for the help of Utrecht, and awarded Hagestein to the Prince-Bishop.

Hagestein re-emerged as a small village without fortifications. The Dutch Reformed Church has 13th century elements. It burnt down around 1600 and was redesigned between 1829 and 1830. In 1546, a new small castle was built in Hagestein, but was demolished in 1855. In 1821, the village was moved to South Holland. In 1840, Hagestein was home to 655 people. In 2002, it was returned to Utrecht.

== Gallery ==
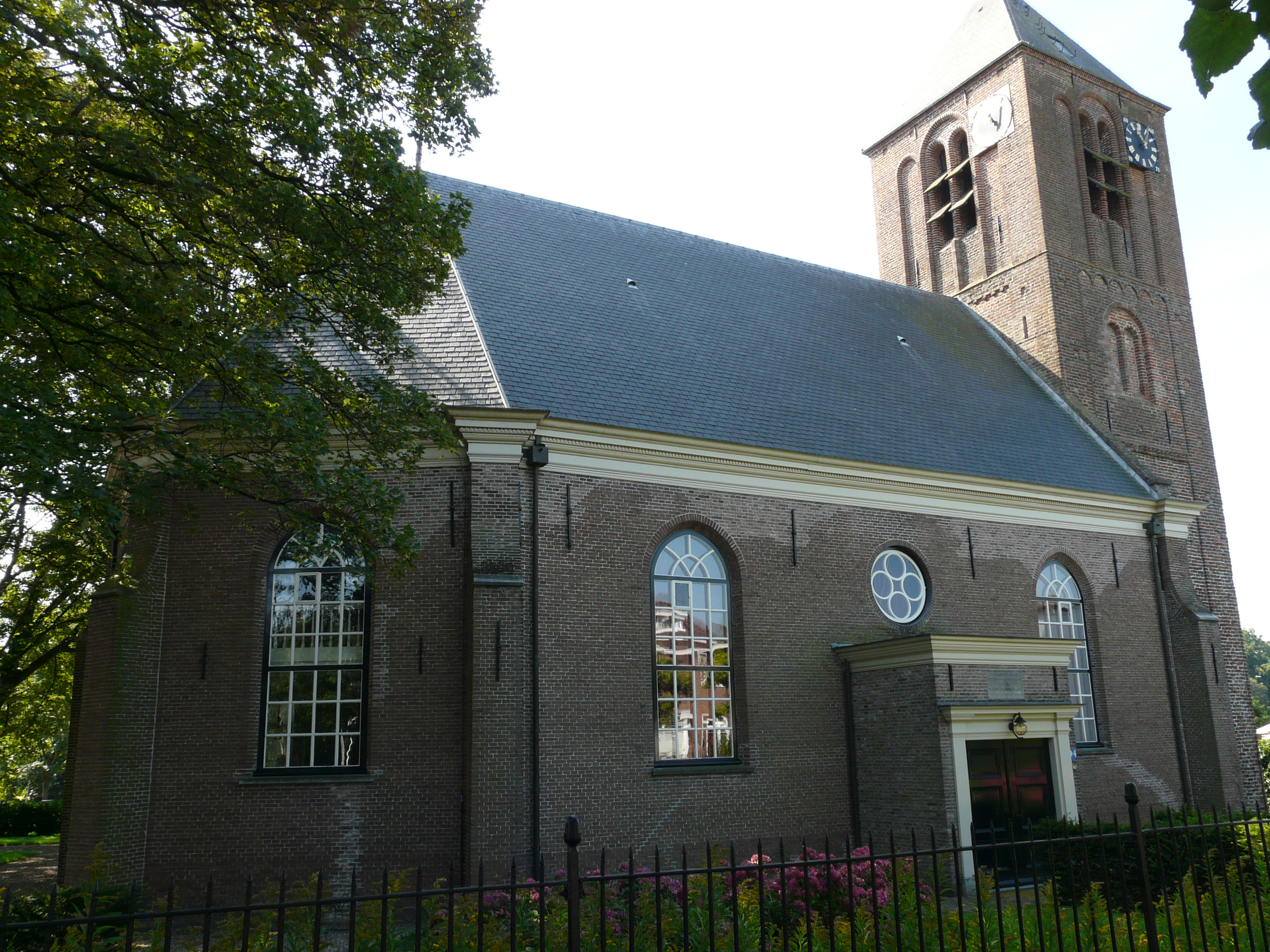
Reformed Church of Hagestein

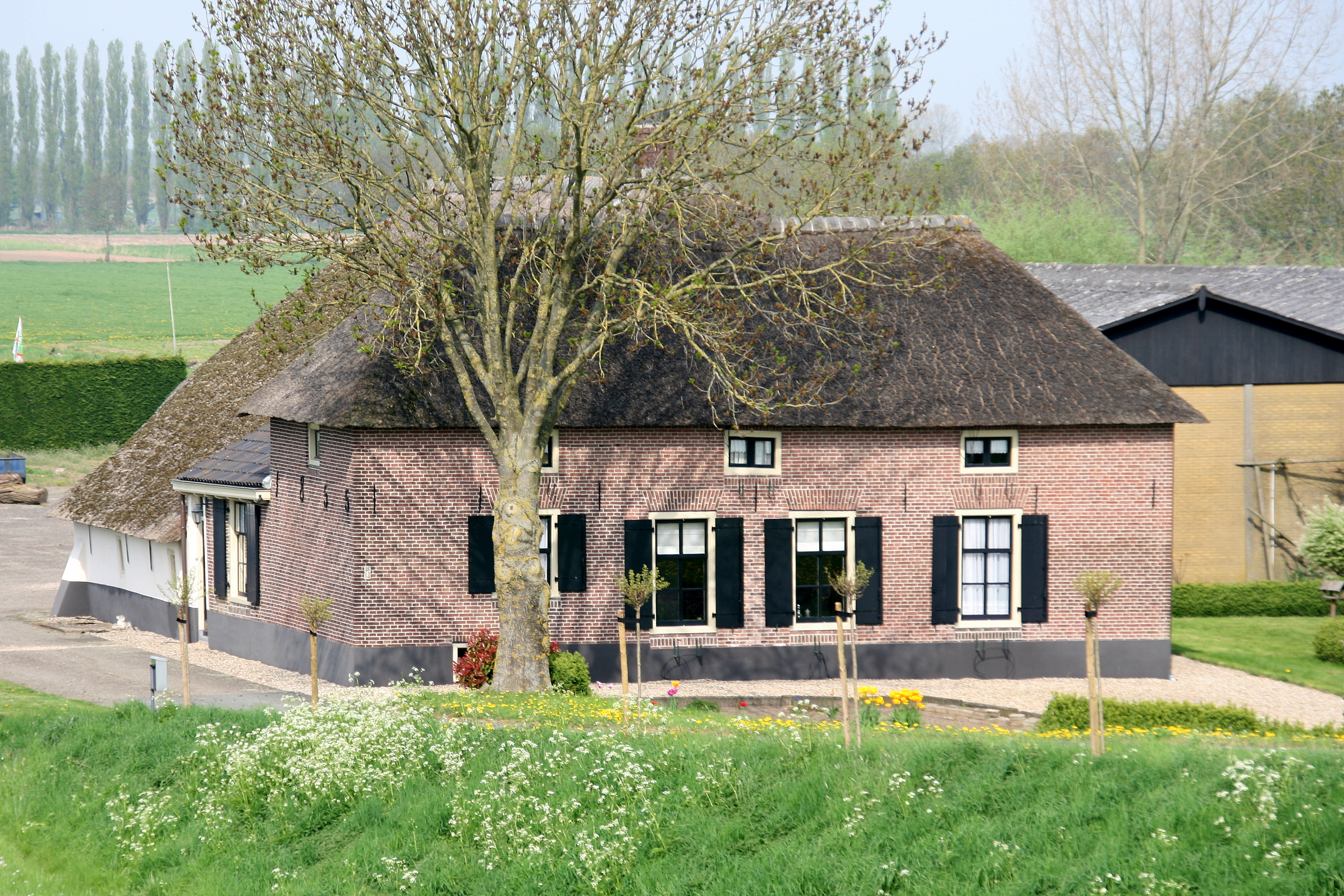
Farm in Hagestein

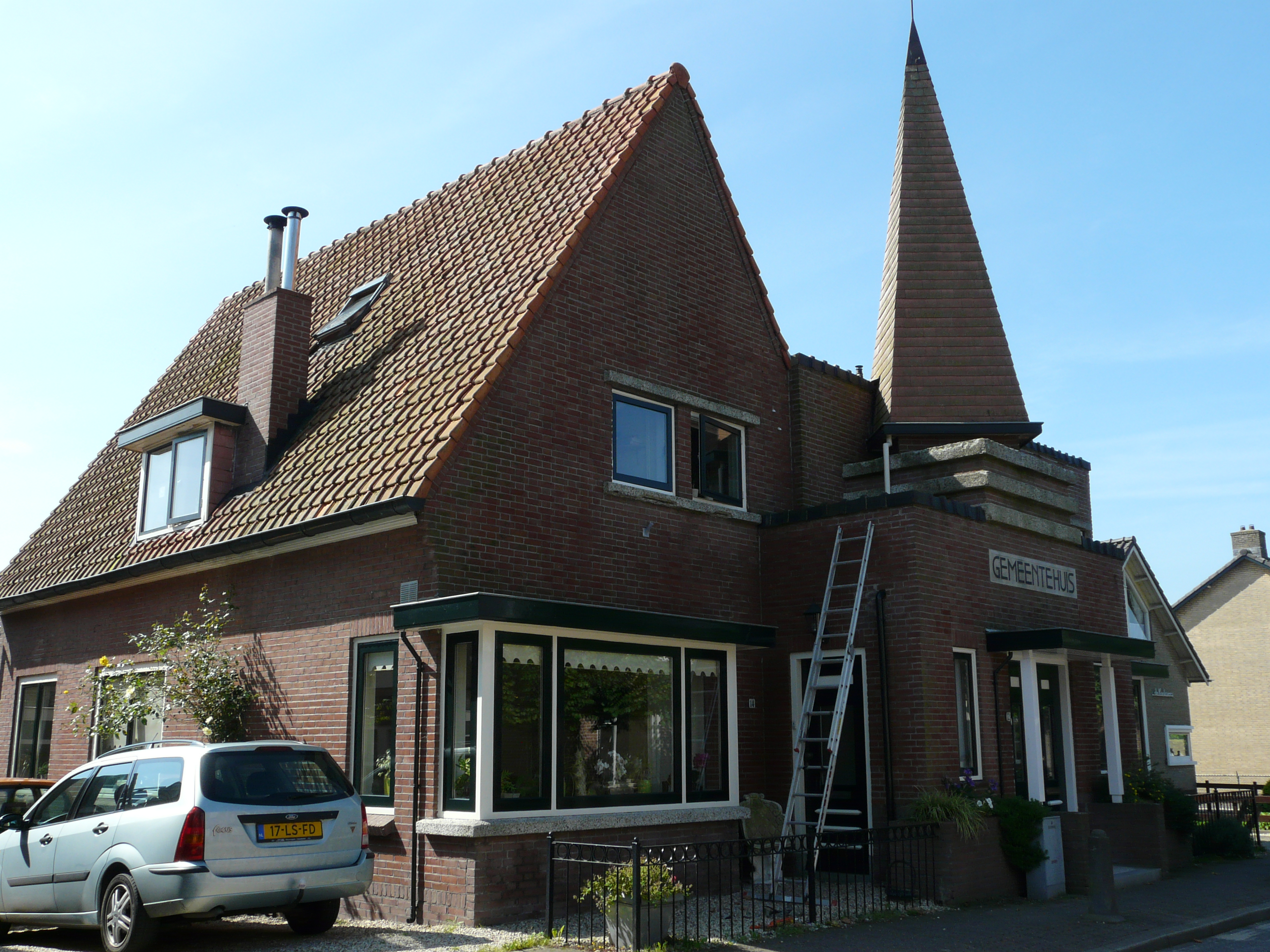
Former town hall

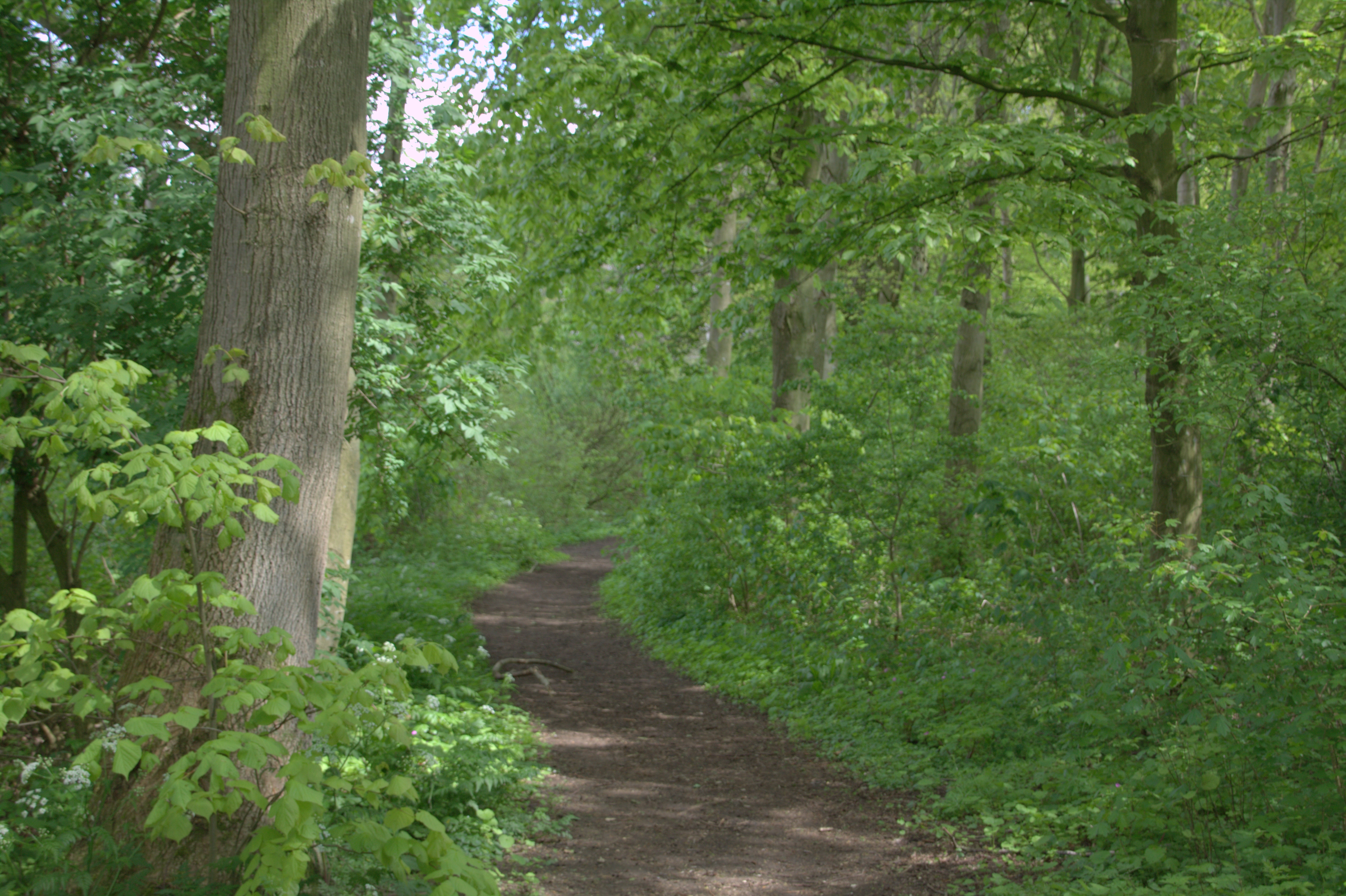
Forest near Hagestein
