= United Duchies of Jülich-Cleves-Berg =

Former territories in modern Germany and the Netherlands

United Duchies of Jülich-Cleves-Berg Vereinigte Herzogtümer Jülich-Kleve-Berg (German) Verenigde Hertogdommen Gulik-Kleef-Berg (Dutch)
- 1521–1614
- Coat of arms

- Map of the Lower Rhenish–Westphalian Circle around 1560, United Duchies of Jülich-Cleves-Berg highlighted in red
- Status: Duchy (State of Holy Roman Empire)
- Capital: Düsseldorf
- Common languages: various closely related West Germanic varieties, e.g. Kleverlandish, Ripuarian, Westphalian, Limburgish
- Historical era: Middle Ages
  - Cleves and Mark inherited by Duke of Jülich-Berg: 1521
  - War of the Jülich Succession: Jun 1609 – Oct 1614
  - Partitioned at Xanten: 12 November 1614
Preceded by
Duchy of Berg
Duchy of Cleves
Duchy of Jülich
County of Mark
County of Ravensberg
Succeeded by
Margraviate of Brandenburg
Palatinate-Neuburg
- Today part of: Germany; Netherlands

The United Duchies of Jülich-Cleves-Berg was a territory in the Holy Roman Empire between 1521 and 1614, formed from the personal union of the duchies of Jülich, Cleves and Berg.

The name was resurrected after the Congress of Vienna for the province of Jülich-Cleves-Berg of the Kingdom of Prussia between 1815 and 1822. Its territory is today split between the German state of North Rhine-Westphalia and the Dutch province of Gelderland.

== History ==
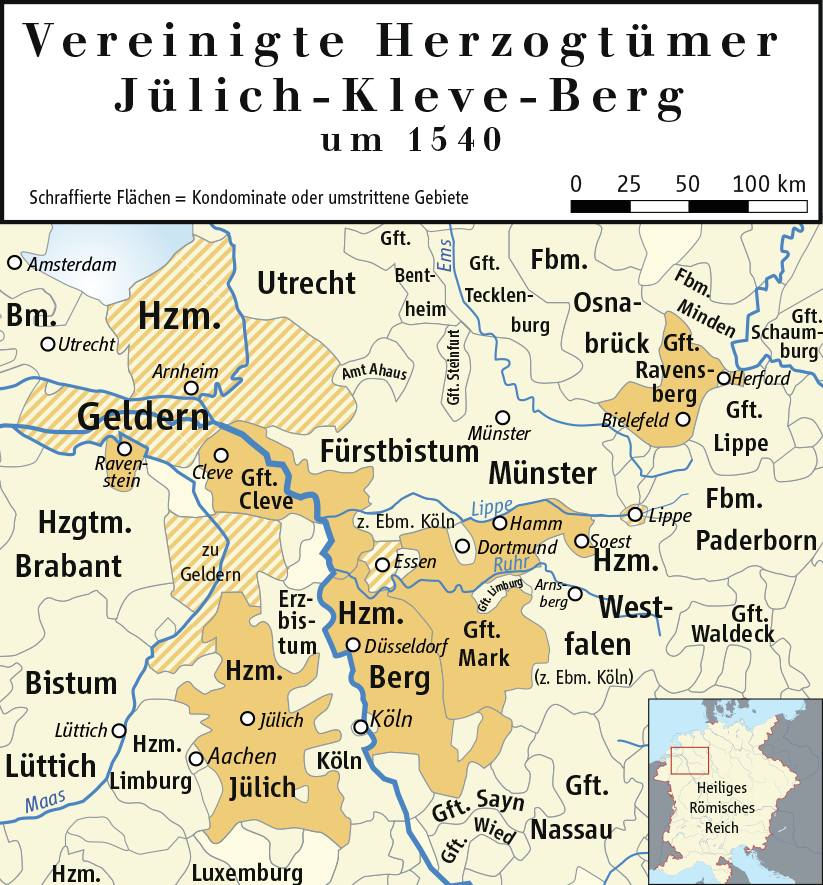
Map of Jülich-Cleves-Berg including the province of Gelderland (around 1540)

The United Duchies of Jülich-Cleves-Berg was a combination of states of the Holy Roman Empire. The duchies of Jülich and Berg united in 1423. Nearly a century later, in 1521, these two duchies, along with the county of Ravensberg, fell extinct, with only the last duke's daughter Maria von Geldern left to inherit; under Salic law, women could only hold property through a husband or guardian, so the territories passed to her husband—and distant relative—John III, Duke of Cleves and Mark as a result of their strategic marriage in 1509. These united duchies controlled most of the present-day North Rhine-Westphalia that was not within the ecclesiastical territories of Electoral Cologne and Münster.

During the reign of Duke William the Rich, the United Duchies challenged Emperor Charles V for control of the Duchy of Guelders. Controlling Guelders would allow for the disconnected lands of the duchies to be connected by land. To counter the Habsburg Emperor, William attempted to form several alliances. For example, his sister, Anne of Cleves, married King Henry VIII of England to create an alliance between England and Jülich-Cleves-Berg. Nonetheless, Charles V defeated William in the Guelders War, and William was forced to accept the Treaty of Venlo. William also spent a lot of his reign developing his lands by constructing fortresses and residencies.

William also set two major laws, the Privilegium Unionis and Priviligium Successionis. The Privilegium Unionis had declared that the Duchies of Jülich, Cleves, and Berg would remain united rather than divided during succession. The Priviligium Successionis declared that in the case of the extinction of the male line, the duchies would pass to a female line.

Only a century after John III's marriage, however, the male line of the House of La Marck, which ruled the duchies, fell extinct, prompting the War of the Jülich Succession over the right to inherit the united duchies. William's son — Duke John William — died without issue in 1609. His inheritance was claimed by the heirs of his two eldest sisters. Whilst the dukes, inspired by the humanism of Desiderius Erasmus, had managed to bear a "via media" between the confessional disputes ensuing from the Protestant Reformation, the heirs of the last duke's two eldest sisters were on opposite sides of the divide. The situation was further complicated by acquisitive desires of Emperor Rudolph II and the Wettin dukes of Saxony—the former particularly worrying to Henry IV of France and the Dutch Republic, who feared any strengthening of the Habsburg Netherlands.

The Lutheran Anna of Prussia was married to John Sigismund, Elector of Brandenburg, whereas Roman Catholic Anna of Cleves was married to Philip Louis, Count Palatine of Neuburg. As a result, after the War of the Jülich Succession (one of the precursors to the Thirty Years' War) was settled at Xanten, the Protestant territories (Cleves, Mark and Ravensburg) passed to Brandenburg-Prussia with the Catholic lands (Jülich and Berg) being awarded to the Palatinate-Neuburg. Years of being trampled by armies had destroyed much of the lands' wealth that had been so renowned under William the Rich.

Philip Louis' grandson Philip William became Elector Palatine in 1685, with the Bergish capital becoming the seat of the Electorate of the Palatinate, until the line inherited Bavaria in 1777. In 1701, the Margrave-Electors of Brandenburg became Kings in Prussia; with Cleves-Mark as their first possession in western Germany, it was the seed of the future Prussian Rhineland.

== Dukes of Jülich-Cleves-Berg, House of La Marck ==
- 1521–1539: John III, Duke of Cleves
- 1539–1592: William the Rich
- 1592–1609: John William

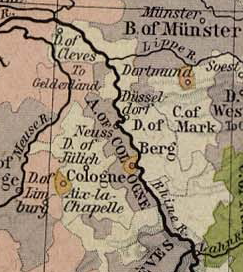

== Descent of the Dukes from the constituent houses ==
Genealogy of the House of Berg in Cleves, Julich, Mark and Berg

House of Berg

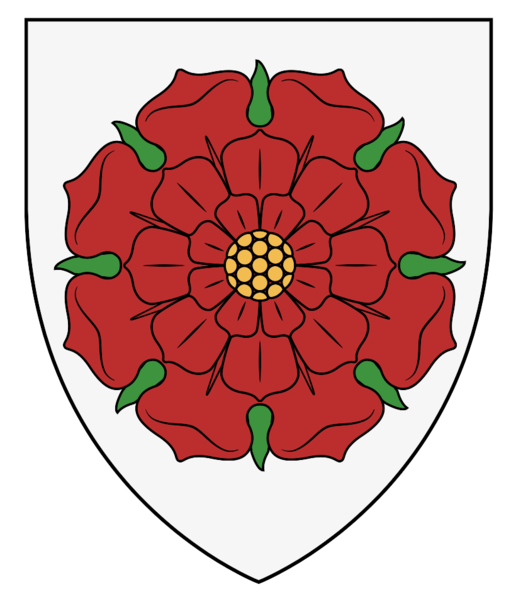
COUNT OR DUKE OF BERG	COUNT OR DUKE OF CLEVES	COUNT OR DUKE OF JŰLICH	ISENBERG/LIMBURG	COUNTS OF THE MARK	COUNTS OF RAVENSBURG	COUN OR DUKE OF GELDERLAND
Herman I Count Palatine of Lorraine; 985–996	Otto II; Emperor; 973–983
Adolf of Lorraine	Ezzo; Count Palatine of Lorraine; 996–1034 ancestor of Ezzonids	Mathilde d. 1025
Adolf	Richeza d. 1063	Mieszko II; Duke of Poland; 1025–1031; 1032–1034
Adolf I Count of Berg; 1077–c.1082	Casimir I the Restorer; Duke of Poland; 1034, rebellion 1038/40–1058
Adolf II of Berg; Count of Berg c.1082–c.1090	House of Wassenberg
Adolf III of Berg; Count of Berg c.1090–1106	Gerard I Flamens(ca. 970 - † bef. 1042)	Rütger I Count of Cleves d.<1092 House of Wassenberg
Adolf IV of Berg; Count of Berg; 1106–1161 or	Bruno II von Berg; Archbishop of Cologne; 1131–1137	Counts and dukes of Guelders	Arnold; Count of Cleves (<1092–c.1147)
Engelbert I Count of Berg; 1161–1189	Friedrich II of Berg; Archbishop of Cologne; 1156–1158	Adolf V d. 1148 (at Damascus)	Bruno III of Berg; Archbishop of Cologne; 1191–1193 d. 1196/1200	Eberhard I, Count of Berg-Altena (and IV); 1140 – 1180 eastern part of Berg becomes c. of Altena	Dietrich III; Count of Cleves c.1147–c.1172
Adolf VI; Count of Berg; 1189–1218	Engelbert II the Holy; Archbishop of Cologne; 1216–1225	Walter of Hennebach d.<1172	Arnold of Altena (1166 - 1209) 1st count of Isenberg, ancestor of counts of Limburg Hohenlimburg and Broich	Adolf of Altena (1168 - 1220) Archbishop of Cologne, 1193 - 1205, 1212 - 1214	Friedrich I of Altena (1173–1198) count of Berg-Altena, which renamed C. of Mark, ancestor of House of La Marck	Dietrich IV; Count of Cleves (1172–1193)
Irmgard of Berg d.1248	Henry IV (Arlon); Duke of Limburg; 1226–1246; 1/2 br. was Henry V, Count of Luxembourg anc. of Imperial House of Luxembourg	Eberhard d. 1218	Eberhard II (born 1180, died 1209) count of Altena and Isenberg	Frederick of Isenberg (1193 – 1226) attained re murder of Archb. of Engelbert II of Cologne	Dietrich III, Bishop of Münster (< 1180 - 1226)	Engelbert of Altena-Isenberg (< 1200 - 1250); B. of Osnabruck (1224-dep. 1226 for Engelbert II of Berg's assassination, rehab. 1238-1250)	Adolf I, Count of Mark (1194? - 1249)	Dietrich V Count of Cleves; 1193–1260
Adolf VII (1220 † 1259); Count of Berg	Waleran IV († 1279); Duke of Limburg	William III, Count of Jülich; 1207-1219 heir of uncle William II	Dietrich I of Isenberg before 1215–1301; 1st Count of Limburg (Counts of Limburg Hohenlimburg and Broich)	Friedrich of Altena (< 1220 - > 1243); C. of Limburg-Isenberg	Engelbert I, Count of Mark(d. 1277); C. of the Mark, 1249, C. of Altena, 1269	Otto, (1212-1269) C. of Altena	Dietrich VI; Count of Cleves; 1260–1275
Ermengarde († 1283)	Reginald I Count of Guelders (Wassenberg)	William IV, Count of Jülich (c. 1210 – 1278)	Johann of Isenberg-Limburg (< 1246 - < 1277)	Eberhard, Count of Mark (c. 1255–1308)	Dietrich VII (1256–1305); Count of Cleves,(1275–1305)
Adolf VIII of Berg († 1296) Count of Berg	William I († 1308) Count of Berg	Henry of Windeck († 1292)	Walram, Count of Jülich (1240/45 – 1297)	Gerhard V, C. of Jülich (bef 1250 – 1328), count 1297	from here desc. LIMBURG-STIRUM (see below)	Engelbert II, Count of Mark (1275 – 1328)	Adolf II (bishop of Liège) (1288 – 1344)	Dietrich VIII (c. 1291 – 1347); Count of Cleves (1311–1347)	Otto, Count of Cleves (1278 – 1310); Count of Cleves (1305–1311)	John (1293-1368); Count of Cleves (1347–1368)
Adolf IX of Berg († 1348) Count of Berg	Margaret of Berg-Windeck d.< 1339 m. Otto IV, Count of Ravensberg	Walram; Archbishop of Cologne; 1332–1349	William; V as count, I as margrave & duke (c. 1299 – 1361)	Eberhard I (d. about 1378), Count of Arenberg see below House of Marck-Arenberg/Bouillon/Lummey	Engelbert (1304–1368), Prince-Bishop of Liège 1345–1364, Archbishop of Cologne 1364–68	Adolf II, Count of Mark (d.1347)	Margaret of Cleves, Countess of the Marck (c. 1310 – after 1348)
Margaret of Ravensberg	Gerhard VI count of Berg, Ravensberg	William VI; II duke of Jülich ∞ Maria, Duchess of Guelders	Engelbert III (1333–1391), C. of the Mark, 1347	Adolf III (1334–1394), Absp. of Cologne, 1363-64, C. of Cleves, 1368
William VII of Jülich, 1st Duke of Berg duke of Berg, count of Ravensberg	William duke of Guelders, III of Jülich ∞ Katherine of Bavaria	Reinald IV duke of Guelders, Jülich	Joanna of Jülich ∞ John V lord of Arkel	Adolph I (1373–1448), his successor in Cleves, 1394 and also in Marck, 1398. Duke of Cleves, 1417	Dietrich (1374–1398), his successor in Marck.	Gerhard († 1461), de facto Count of the Marck, but not allowed to use the title.
Adolf (c. 1370 – 1437); Count of Ravensberg, 1395-1403; Duke of Berg, 1408; Duke of Jülich, 1423	William VIII (c. 1380 – 1428) count of Ravensberg, 1403	Marie of Harcourt (daughter of John VI count of Harcourt)	Maria van Arkel ∞ John II lord of Egmond	John I (1419–1481); Duke of Cleves, 1448; Count of the Mark, 1448/1461	Elizabeth of Nevers, daughter of John II, Count of Nevers(Valois-Burgundy)	Adolph of Cleves, Lord of Ravenstein (1425–1492) m. 1453, to Beatrice of Portugal
Rupert (d. 1431)	Gerhard VII duke of Jülich-Berg, count of Ravensberg	Arnold duke of Guelders; HOUSE OF EGMONT	John II (1458-1521); Duke of Cleves & Count of the Mark, 1521	Engelbert, Count of Nevers (1462-1506); Count of Nevers, 1491upon death of his maternal grandfather John II, Count of Nevers	Philip of Cleves (1467–1505); Bishop of Nevers, Amiens and Autun
William; IV duke of Jülich-Berg, count of Ravensberg ∞ Sibylle of Brandenburg
Maria of Jülich-Berg	John III (1490-1539); Duke of Cleves & Count of the Mark, 1511; Duke of Jülich & Berg, Count of Ravensberg, 1521; HOUSE OF LA MARCK	Adolf (1498–1525), appointed by his father's cousin Philip of Cleves, Lord of Ravenstein and Wijnendale, as his successor, but died before Philip did in 1528	Charles II, Count of Nevers (d.1521)m.Marie of Albret, Countess of Rethel
Sibylle d.1554	John Frederick I the Magnanimous; Elector of Saxony; 1532–1547 d.1554	Anne of Cleves d.1557	Henry VIII; King of England; 1509–1547; King of Ireland; 1541–1547	William I the Rich; Duke of Cleves–Jülich– Mark–Berg– Ravensberg; 1539–1592	Maria of Austria d.1581 d. of Ferdinand I, Holy Roman Emperor	Francis I Count of Nevers, 1521-39; Duke of Nevers, 1539-62
John William; Duke of Cleves–Jülich– Mark–Berg– Ravensberg; 1592–1609	Albert Frederick; Duke of Prussia; 1568–1618	Marie Eleonore (1550 – 1608)	Anna (1552 – 1632)	Philip Louis; C. Palatine/Duke of Neuburg; 1569–1614	Magdalena d.1633	John Casimir of Zweibrucken d.1604 Montferrat; 1631–1637	François II, Duke of Nevers (c. 1540 – 1563); French Prince étranger and general	Jacques, Duke of Nevers (c. 1544 – 1564) rench Prince étranger and general	Henriette of Cleves (1542 – 1601)	Louis de Gonzague, Duke of Nevers (1539 – 2 1595); French Prince étranger,soldier, governor
John Sigismund (1572 - 1619); Margrave & Elector of Brandenburg; 1608–1619; Duke of Prussia,1618–1619	Anna of Prussia (1576 – 1625) awarded prot. Cleves, Mark & Ravensberg 1614–1619 settlement	Magdalene Sibylle of Prussia (1586 –1659) m. John George I, Elector of Saxony	William Wolfgang; Count Palatine & Duke of Neuburg; 1614–1653 awarded Cath. Jülich & Berg, desc.	Augustus, Count Palatine of Sulzbach (1582–1632); Catholic, desc. eventual heirs and inheritors & Counts Palatine and Bavaria	John Casimir; Count Palatine of Zweibrücken d.1652	Charles I Gonzaga (1580 – 1637); Duke of Mantua and Duke of Montferrat from 1627
George William; Margrave & Elector of Brandenburg; Duke of Prussia; 1619–1640	John George II; Elector of Saxony; 1656–1680

== See also ==
- Province of Jülich-Cleves-Berg
