= House of Jülich =

Historical German noble family

The House of Jülich, German: Haus von Jülich, was a noble House in Germany, operating from the 12th to the 16th century. Its members were initially counts of Jülich, then promoted to dukes of Jülich. By marriage they acquired the duchy of Gelders, which eventually passed to the House of Egmond. They again acquired the counties of Berg & Ravensberg by marriage, and as counts of Berg were elevated to the dukes of Berg; the House became extinct when in 1511 the last male member died and in 1543 the last female died.

Coat-of-arm of Jülich.

== History ==
The members of the House were counts of Jülich, until Wiliam V supported Emperor Charles IV, who in turn rewarded William V by elevating him as duke of Jülich. William V had two sons, William II and Gerhard VI.

Coat-of-arm of Guelders (gold lion) and Jülich (black lion).

William II duke of Jülich married to Maria, daughter and successor of duke of Guelders (nederlands: Gerle, deutsch: Gueldern), thus he became jure auxoris duke of Guelders. He had three children, William, Reinald IV and Johanna. Both his sons died childless, so the duchy of Guelders passed to Johanna's grandson Arnold of the House of Egmond.

Coat-of-arm of Jülich (black lion), Berg (red lion) and Ravensberg (above all, three red chevrons).

Gerhard VI married to Margaret of Ravensberg and Berg, who had inherited the county of Ravensberg from her father and the county of Berg from her mother. Thus Gerhard VI became jure auxoris count of Berg and Ravensberg. His son William VII count of Berg elevated from Emperor Wenceslaus to duke of Berg. The grandson of William VII, Gerhard VII, inherit the duchy of Jülich from Reinhard IV and the duchy of Berg from his uncle Adolf. His son William IV was duke of Jülich-Berg, but had no sons, thus succeeded by his daughter Maria with her husband John III duke of Cleves, of the House of La Mark.

== Family tree of the House of Jülich ==
HOUSE OF JÜLICH
William II	Eberhard II
William III count of Jülich
William IV count of Jülich
Walram count of Jülich	Gerhard V count of Jülich
Margaret of Berg	William V I duke of Jülich	Walram archbishop of Cologne
Margaret of Ravensberg	Gerhard VI count of Berg, Ravensberg	William VI; II duke of Jülich ∞ Maria, Duchess of Guelders
William VII duke of Berg, count of Ravensberg	William duke of Guelders, III of Jülich ∞ Katherine of Bavaria	Reinald IV duke of Guelders, Jülich	Joanna of Jülich ∞ John V lord of Arkel
Adolf duke of Jülich-Berg	William VIII count of Ravensberg	Marie of Harcourt (daughter of John VI count of Harcourt)	Maria van Arkel ∞ John II lord of Egmond
Rupert	Gerhard VII duke of Jülich-Berg, count of Ravensberg	Arnold duke of Guelders; HOUSE OF EGMONT
William; IV duke of Jülich-Berg, count of Ravensberg ∞ Sibylle of Brandenburg
Maria ∞ John III duke of Cleves; HOUSE OF LA MARCK

== Sources ==
- Walther Möller, Stammtafeln westdeutscher Adelsgeschlechter im Mittelalter (Darmstadt, 1922, reprint Verlag Degener & Co., 1995), Vol. 1, page 14.
- Severin Corsten: Der Überfall Heinsberger Kriegsknechte auf das Münster in Aachen (1428), in: Heimatkalender des Kreises Heinsberg 2011. Published by the county of Heinsberg, Heinsberg 2011, ISBN 978-3-925620-32-4, p. 27 ff.
