= William of Jülich (disambiguation) =

William of Jülich (died 1304) was a Flemish military commander.

William of Jülich may refer to:

- William I, Count of Jülich (died 1176)
- William II, Count of Jülich (died 1207)
- William III, Count of Jülich (died 1219)
- William IV, Count of Jülich (died 1278)
- William I, Duke of Jülich (died 1361), count of Jülich as William V
- William II, Duke of Jülich (died 1393)
- William I of Guelders and Jülich (1364-1402), duke of Jülich as William III
- William IV, Duke of Jülich-Berg (died 1511)
- William, Duke of Jülich-Cleves-Berg (1516-1592), duke of Jülich as William V, nicknamed "the Rich"
