= Gerhard VII of Jülich-Berg =

Duke of Jülich-Berg (1437-1475), Count of Ravensberg (1428-1475)

Gerhard VII, Duke of Jülich-Berg
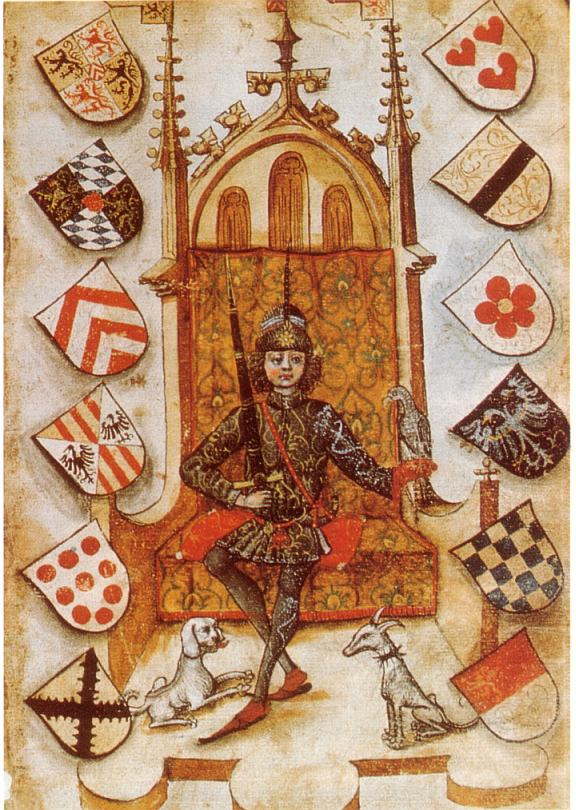
- Duke Gerhard VII of Jülich-Berg. Miniature of 1480
- Born: c. 1416
- Died: 19 August 1475; Lülsdorf Castle, Niederkassel
- Noble family: House of Jülich
- Spouse: Sophie of Saxe-Lauenburg
- Father: William VIII of Jülich, Count of Ravensberg
- Mother: Adelheid of Tecklenburg

Gerhard VII, Duke of Jülich-Berg (c. 1416 – 19 August 1475) was the son of William VIII of Jülich, Count of Ravensberg and Adelheid of Tecklenburg. Gerhard was the second duke of the combined Duchy of Jülich-Berg but the 7th Gerhard in the House of Jülich.

Upon his father's death in 1428, Gerhard became Count of Ravensberg. In 1437, his uncle Adolf died without heirs and Gerhard inherited his title as Duke of Jülich-Berg. Gerhard continued his uncle's fight for the dukedom of Guelders, supported by King Albert II of Germany. In 1444 he won the Battle of Linnich but was unable to prevail in his fight for Guelders and ultimately sold his claim to Burgundy and acquired Blankenheim-Löwenberg and Heinsberg from Guelders. He was increasingly unable to govern his territories after 1461. His spouse Sophie of Saxe-Lauenburg then wielded regency for him.

== Family and children ==
In 1444, Gerhard married Sophie of Saxe-Lauenburg (1428 – 9 September 1473), daughter of Bernard II, Duke of Saxe-Lauenburg. They had the following children:

1. William (1455–1511), succeeded his father as Duke of Jülich-Berg
2. Adolf (1458–1470)
3. Gerhard (died young)
4. Anna, married John III, Count of Mörs and Saarwerden

== Ancestors ==
Ancestors of Gerhard VII of Jülich-Berg

16. William V, Duke of Jülich
8. Gerhard VI of Jülich, Count of Berg and Ravensberg
17. Joanna of Hainaut
4. William VII of Jülich, 1st Duke of Berg
18. Otto IV, Count of Ravensberg
9. Margaret of Ravensberg
19. Margaret of Berg-Windeck
2. William VIII of Jülich, Count of Ravensberg
20. Adolf, Count Palatine of the Rhine
10. Rupert II, Elector Palatine
21. Irmengard of Oettingen
5. Anna of the Palatinate
22. Peter II of Sicily
11. Beatrice of Sicily
23. Elisabeth of Carinthia
1. Gerhard VII, Duke of Jülich-Berg
24. Nicholas I, Count of Tecklenburg
12. Otto VI, Count of Tecklenburg
25. Helena of Oldenburg-Wildeshausen-Altbruchhausen
6. Nicholas II, Count of Tecklenburg
26. Bernard V, Lord of Lippe
13. Adelaide of Lippe
27. Richarda of the Marck
3. Adelheid of Tecklenburg
28. Dietrich IV of Moers
14. Frederick III, Count of Moers
29. Elisabeth of Zuilen
7. Anna Elisabeth of Moers
30. John II of Saarwerden
15. Walburga of Saarwerden
31. Clara of Vinstingen

Gerhard VII of Jülich-Berg House of Jülich Born: c. 1416 Died: 19 August 1475
German nobility
| Preceded by William II | Count of Ravensberg; 1428–1475 | Succeeded by William IV as William III, Count of Ravensberg; William IV, Duke of Jülich-Berg |
| Preceded by Adolph VII | Duke of Jülich-Berg; 1437–1475 | Succeeded by William IV as William III, Count of Ravensberg; William IV, Duke of Jülich-Berg |
