= Duchy of Jülich =

State of the Holy Roman Empire (c. 1003–1794)

Coordinates: 50°55′N 06°21′E

Duchy of Jülich Herzogtum Jülich (German) Hertogdom Gulik (Dutch)
- c. 1003–1794
- Coat of arms

- Map of the Lower Rhenish–Westphalian Circle around 1560, Duchy of Jülich highlighted in red
- Status: State of the Holy Roman Empire
- Capital: Jülich
- Common languages: Ripuarian
- Government: Duchy
- Historical era: Middle Ages, Renaissance
  - Gerhard I, first count: c. 1003
  - Raised to duchy: 1356
  - United with Berg: 1423
  - United with Cleves and Berg: → 1521
  - Held by Palatinate-Neuburg: 1614
  - Annexed by France: 1794
  - To Prussia and Netherlands: 1815
Preceded by	Succeeded by
Lower Lotharingia	Roer (department); Cisrhenian Republic

The Duchy of Jülich (German: Herzogtum Jülich; Dutch: Hertogdom Gulik; French: Duché de Juliers) comprised a state within the Holy Roman Empire from the 11th to the 18th centuries. The duchy lay west of the Rhine river and was bordered by the Electorate of Cologne to the east and the Duchy of Limburg to the west. It had territories on both sides of the river Rur, around its capital Jülich – the former Roman Iuliacum – in the lower Rhineland. The duchy amalgamated with the County of Berg beyond the Rhine in 1423, and from then on also became known as Jülich-Berg. Later it became part of the United Duchies of Jülich-Cleves-Berg.

Its territory lies in present-day Germany (part of North Rhine-Westphalia) and in the present-day Netherlands (part of the Limburg province), its population sharing the same Limburgish dialect.

== History ==
=== County ===
In the 9th century a certain Matfried was count of Jülich (pagus Juliacensis). The first mention of a count in the gau of Jülich in Lower Lorraine, is Gerhard I, in 1003; his grandson Gerhard III began to call himself Count of Jülich in 1081.

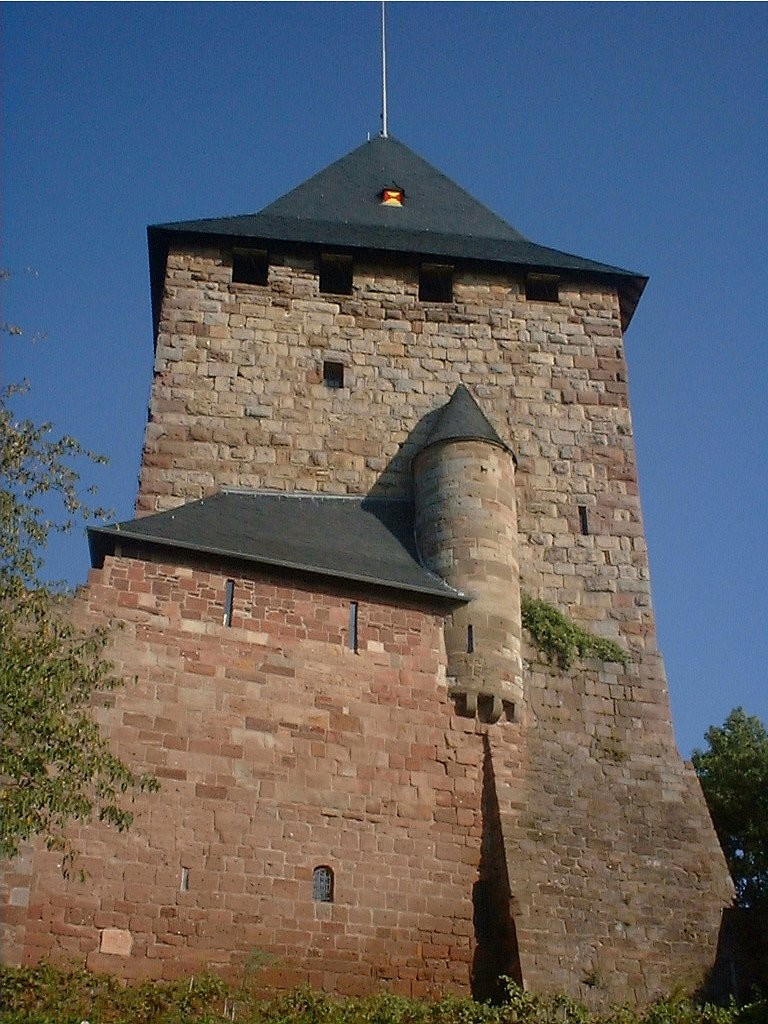
Nideggen Castle

William IV, who became count in 1219, significantly enlarged the territory and in 1234 granted Jülich town privileges. By 1240 his territorial expansion created conflict on the eastern side of his territory with the Archbishop of Cologne Konrad von Hochstaden, whose troops devastated the city five years later.

William IV's son Walram (Count from 1278 to 1297) remained a fierce opponent of the Bishopric, supporting Duke John I of Brabant at the 1288 Battle of Worringen against Archbishop Siegfried II of Westerburg. Walram was succeeded by his younger brother Count Gerhard V who had sided with German king Adolf of Nassau against his rival Albert I of Habsburg.Gerhard managed to retain his territories after Adolf of Nassau lost the Battle of Göllheim in 1298, and in 1314 supported the coronation of Louis IV of Wittelsbach at the nearby City of Aachen, once more against the will of the Cologne bishop.

=== Duchy ===
Gerhard died in 1328. His eldest son succeeded him as Count William V. Gerhard's younger son Walram became Archbishop of Cologne in 1332. In 1336 Count William received the title of margrave from Emperor Louis IV, and in 1356 Emperor Charles IV of Luxembourg raised William V to the rank of duke. His son Duke William II, however, became entangled in a fierce feud with the Emperor's half-brother Wenceslaus of Luxembourg, Duke of Brabant, whom he defeated at the Battle of Baesweiler in 1371.

Thereafter Jülich's history became closely intertwined with that of its neighbours: the Duchies of Cleves and Berg as well as Guelders and the County of Mark: Duke William II had married Mary, the daughter of Duke Reginald II of Guelders, and duchess herself after the death of her half-brother Reginald III of Guelders in 1371. William II settled the conflict with the Imperial House of Luxembourg and his son William III inherited both duchies, thereby becoming William I of Guelders and Jülich.

In 1402, Duke William I Guelders and Jülich died without any legitimate offspring. He was succeeded by his younger brother Reinald IV, Duke of Guelders and Jülich, who also died without heirs in 1423. The Gelderland estates chose Arnold of Egmond as duke, while Jülich amalgamated with Berg and passed to Adolf, Duke of Jülich-Berg, who belonged to a younger branch, and who had obtained Berg by virtue of the marriage of one of his ancestors.

In 1511 Duke John III of Cleves inherited Jülich and Berg through marriage with Maria of Jülich-Berg, the daughter of the last Duke, William IV. She inherited her father's estates: Jülich and Berg with the County of Ravensberg. From 1521 Jülich-Berg and Cleves formed the United Duchies of Jülich-Cleves-Berg in a personal union under Duke John III.

When the last duke of Jülich-Cleves-Berg died without direct heirs in 1609, the War of the Jülich Succession broke out. It ended with the 1614 Treaty of Xanten, which divided the separate duchies between Palatinate-Neuburg and the Margraviate of Brandenburg. Jülich and Berg fell to Count Palatine Wolfgang William of Neuburg and after the last duke of Palatinate-Neuburg (also Elector of the Palatinate from 1685) Charles III Philip had died without issue in 1742, Count Charles Theodore of Palatinate-Sulzbach (after 1777 also Duke of Bavaria) inherited Jülich and Berg.

In 1794 Revolutionary France occupied the Duchy of Jülich (Duché de Juliers), which became part of the French département of the Roer. The Treaty of Lunéville in 1801 officially acknowledged the cession of Jülich to France. In 1815, following the defeat of Napoleon, the duchy became part of the Prussian Province of Jülich-Cleves-Berg (after 1822 part of the Prussian Rhine Province), except for the cities Sittard and Tegelen, which became part of the United Kingdom of the Netherlands.

== Rulers ==
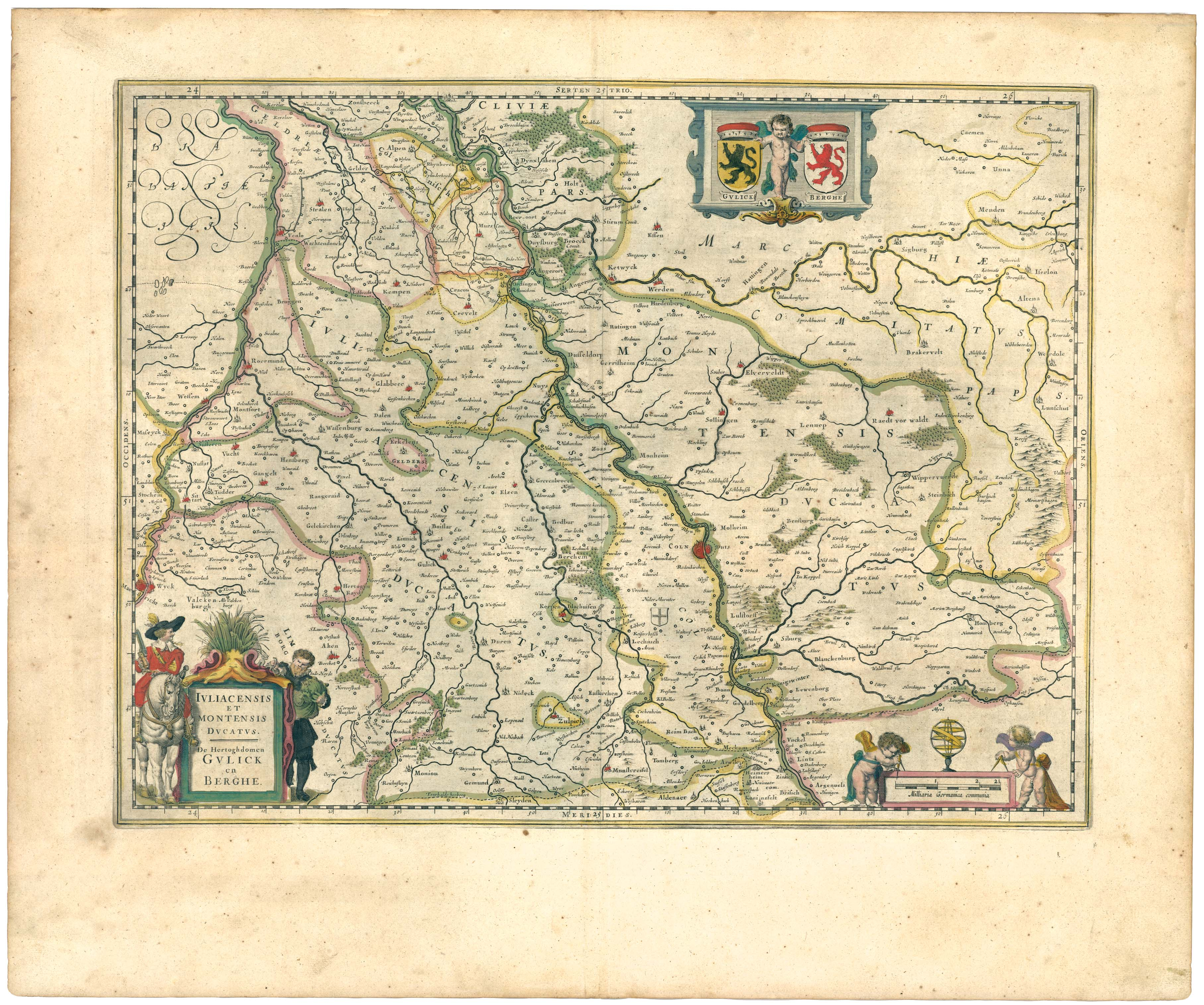
Map of the Duchy of Jülich-Berg from Theater of the World, or a New Atlas of Maps and Representations of All Regions, edited by Willem and Joan Blaeu, 1645

=== Counts of Jülich ===
- 1003–1029 Gerhard I, Count in the Jülichgau
- 1029–1081 Gerhard II
- 1081–1128 Gerhard III, Count of Jülich
- 1128–1142 Gerhard IV
- 1142–1176 William I
- 1176–1207 William II
- 1207–1219 William III
- 1219–1278 William IV
- 1278–1297 Walram
- 1297–1328 Gerhard V
- 1328–1356 William V, margrave from 1336, duke from 1356 as William I

=== Dukes ===
— 1393–1423 in Union with Guelders, from 1423 with Berg, from 1437 with Ravensberg —

- 1356–1361 William I (previously Count of Jülich)
- 1362–1393 William II
- 1393–1402 William III, also Duke of Guelders since 1377
- 1402–1423 Reinald
- 1423–1437 Adolf
- 1437–1475 Gerhard
- 1475–1511 William IV

=== House of La Marck, Dukes ===
– from 1521 a part of the United Duchies of Jülich-Cleves-Berg –

- 1511–1539 John
- 1539–1592 William V
- 1592–1609 John William I

=== House of Wittelsbach, Dukes ===
– in union with Berg and Palatinate-Neuburg, after 1690 also with the Electorate of the Palatinate, from 1777 also with Bavaria –

- 1614–1653 Wolfgang William
- 1653–1679 Philip William
- 1679–1716 John William II
- 1716–1742 Charles Philip
- 1742–1794 Charles Theodore

=== Cities ===
Several cities and municipalities belonged to the Duchy of Jülich: - Jülich • Düren • Münstereifel • Euskirchen • Nideggen • Bergheim • Kaster • Grevenbroich • Mönchengladbach • Dahlen • Dülken • Linnich • Randerath • Brüggen • Süchteln • Aldenhoven • Heimbach • Monschau • Wassenberg • Heinsberg • Gangelt • Geilenkirchen • Waldfeucht • Sittard • Susteren • Sinzig • Tegelen • Remagen.

=== Descent of the Rulers: Genealogy of the House of Berg in Cleves, Julich, Mark and Berg ===
Genealogy of the House of Berg in Cleves, Julich, Mark and Berg

House of Berg

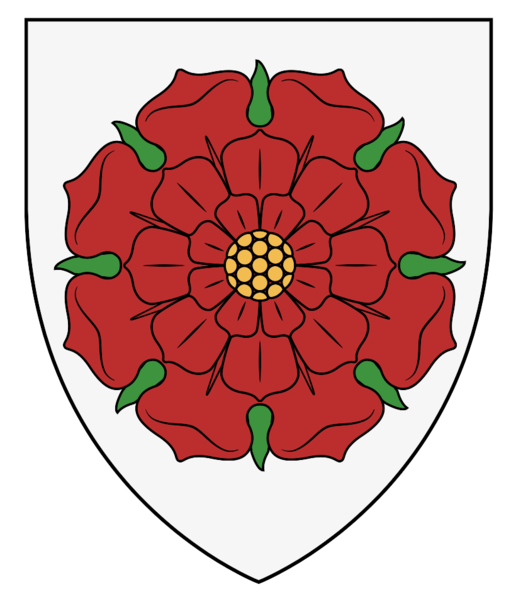
COUNT OR DUKE OF BERG	COUNT OR DUKE OF CLEVES	COUNT OR DUKE OF JŰLICH	ISENBERG/LIMBURG	COUNTS OF THE MARK	COUNTS OF RAVENSBURG	COUN OR DUKE OF GELDERLAND
Herman I Count Palatine of Lorraine; 985–996	Otto II; Emperor; 973–983
Adolf of Lorraine	Ezzo; Count Palatine of Lorraine; 996–1034 ancestor of Ezzonids	Mathilde d. 1025
Adolf	Richeza d. 1063	Mieszko II; Duke of Poland; 1025–1031; 1032–1034
Adolf I Count of Berg; 1077–c.1082	Casimir I the Restorer; Duke of Poland; 1034, rebellion 1038/40–1058
Adolf II of Berg; Count of Berg c.1082–c.1090	House of Wassenberg
Adolf III of Berg; Count of Berg c.1090–1106	Gerard I Flamens(ca. 970 - † bef. 1042)	Rütger I Count of Cleves d.<1092 House of Wassenberg
Adolf IV of Berg; Count of Berg; 1106–1161 or	Bruno II von Berg; Archbishop of Cologne; 1131–1137	Counts and dukes of Guelders	Arnold; Count of Cleves (<1092–c.1147)
Engelbert I Count of Berg; 1161–1189	Friedrich II of Berg; Archbishop of Cologne; 1156–1158	Adolf V d. 1148 (at Damascus)	Bruno III of Berg; Archbishop of Cologne; 1191–1193 d. 1196/1200	Eberhard I, Count of Berg-Altena (and IV); 1140 – 1180 eastern part of Berg becomes c. of Altena	Dietrich III; Count of Cleves c.1147–c.1172
Adolf VI; Count of Berg; 1189–1218	Engelbert II the Holy; Archbishop of Cologne; 1216–1225	Walter of Hennebach d.<1172	Arnold of Altena (1166 - 1209) 1st count of Isenberg, ancestor of counts of Limburg Hohenlimburg and Broich	Adolf of Altena (1168 - 1220) Archbishop of Cologne, 1193 - 1205, 1212 - 1214	Friedrich I of Altena (1173–1198) count of Berg-Altena, which renamed C. of Mark, ancestor of House of La Marck	Dietrich IV; Count of Cleves (1172–1193)
Irmgard of Berg d.1248	Henry IV (Arlon); Duke of Limburg; 1226–1246; 1/2 br. was Henry V, Count of Luxembourg anc. of Imperial House of Luxembourg	Eberhard d. 1218	Eberhard II (born 1180, died 1209) count of Altena and Isenberg	Frederick of Isenberg (1193 – 1226) attained re murder of Archb. of Engelbert II of Cologne	Dietrich III, Bishop of Münster (< 1180 - 1226)	Engelbert of Altena-Isenberg (< 1200 - 1250); B. of Osnabruck (1224-dep. 1226 for Engelbert II of Berg's assassination, rehab. 1238-1250)	Adolf I, Count of Mark (1194? - 1249)	Dietrich V Count of Cleves; 1193–1260
Adolf VII (1220 † 1259); Count of Berg	Waleran IV († 1279); Duke of Limburg	William III, Count of Jülich; 1207-1219 heir of uncle William II	Dietrich I of Isenberg before 1215–1301; 1st Count of Limburg (Counts of Limburg Hohenlimburg and Broich)	Friedrich of Altena (< 1220 - > 1243); C. of Limburg-Isenberg	Engelbert I, Count of Mark(d. 1277); C. of the Mark, 1249, C. of Altena, 1269	Otto, (1212-1269) C. of Altena	Dietrich VI; Count of Cleves; 1260–1275
Ermengarde († 1283)	Reginald I Count of Guelders (Wassenberg)	William IV, Count of Jülich (c. 1210 – 1278)	Johann of Isenberg-Limburg (< 1246 - < 1277)	Eberhard, Count of Mark (c. 1255–1308)	Dietrich VII (1256–1305); Count of Cleves,(1275–1305)
Adolf VIII of Berg († 1296) Count of Berg	William I († 1308) Count of Berg	Henry of Windeck († 1292)	Walram, Count of Jülich (1240/45 – 1297)	Gerhard V, C. of Jülich (bef 1250 – 1328), count 1297	from here desc. LIMBURG-STIRUM (see below)	Engelbert II, Count of Mark (1275 – 1328)	Adolf II (bishop of Liège) (1288 – 1344)	Dietrich VIII (c. 1291 – 1347); Count of Cleves (1311–1347)	Otto, Count of Cleves (1278 – 1310); Count of Cleves (1305–1311)	John (1293-1368); Count of Cleves (1347–1368)
Adolf IX of Berg († 1348) Count of Berg	Margaret of Berg-Windeck d.< 1339 m. Otto IV, Count of Ravensberg	Walram; Archbishop of Cologne; 1332–1349	William; V as count, I as margrave & duke (c. 1299 – 1361)	Eberhard I (d. about 1378), Count of Arenberg see below House of Marck-Arenberg/Bouillon/Lummey	Engelbert (1304–1368), Prince-Bishop of Liège 1345–1364, Archbishop of Cologne 1364–68	Adolf II, Count of Mark (d.1347)	Margaret of Cleves, Countess of the Marck (c. 1310 – after 1348)
Margaret of Ravensberg	Gerhard VI count of Berg, Ravensberg	William VI; II duke of Jülich ∞ Maria, Duchess of Guelders	Engelbert III (1333–1391), C. of the Mark, 1347	Adolf III (1334–1394), Absp. of Cologne, 1363-64, C. of Cleves, 1368
William VII of Jülich, 1st Duke of Berg duke of Berg, count of Ravensberg	William duke of Guelders, III of Jülich ∞ Katherine of Bavaria	Reinald IV duke of Guelders, Jülich	Joanna of Jülich ∞ John V lord of Arkel	Adolph I (1373–1448), his successor in Cleves, 1394 and also in Marck, 1398. Duke of Cleves, 1417	Dietrich (1374–1398), his successor in Marck.	Gerhard († 1461), de facto Count of the Marck, but not allowed to use the title.
Adolf (c. 1370 – 1437); Count of Ravensberg, 1395-1403; Duke of Berg, 1408; Duke of Jülich, 1423	William VIII (c. 1380 – 1428) count of Ravensberg, 1403	Marie of Harcourt (daughter of John VI count of Harcourt)	Maria van Arkel ∞ John II lord of Egmond	John I (1419–1481); Duke of Cleves, 1448; Count of the Mark, 1448/1461	Elizabeth of Nevers, daughter of John II, Count of Nevers(Valois-Burgundy)	Adolph of Cleves, Lord of Ravenstein (1425–1492) m. 1453, to Beatrice of Portugal
Rupert (d. 1431)	Gerhard VII duke of Jülich-Berg, count of Ravensberg	Arnold duke of Guelders; HOUSE OF EGMONT	John II (1458-1521); Duke of Cleves & Count of the Mark, 1521	Engelbert, Count of Nevers (1462-1506); Count of Nevers, 1491upon death of his maternal grandfather John II, Count of Nevers	Philip of Cleves (1467–1505); Bishop of Nevers, Amiens and Autun
William; IV duke of Jülich-Berg, count of Ravensberg ∞ Sibylle of Brandenburg
Maria of Jülich-Berg	John III (1490-1539); Duke of Cleves & Count of the Mark, 1511; Duke of Jülich & Berg, Count of Ravensberg, 1521; HOUSE OF LA MARCK	Adolf (1498–1525), appointed by his father's cousin Philip of Cleves, Lord of Ravenstein and Wijnendale, as his successor, but died before Philip did in 1528	Charles II, Count of Nevers (d.1521)m.Marie of Albret, Countess of Rethel
Sibylle d.1554	John Frederick I the Magnanimous; Elector of Saxony; 1532–1547 d.1554	Anne of Cleves d.1557	Henry VIII; King of England; 1509–1547; King of Ireland; 1541–1547	William I the Rich; Duke of Cleves–Jülich– Mark–Berg– Ravensberg; 1539–1592	Maria of Austria d.1581 d. of Ferdinand I, Holy Roman Emperor	Francis I Count of Nevers, 1521-39; Duke of Nevers, 1539-62
John William; Duke of Cleves–Jülich– Mark–Berg– Ravensberg; 1592–1609	Albert Frederick; Duke of Prussia; 1568–1618	Marie Eleonore (1550 – 1608)	Anna (1552 – 1632)	Philip Louis; C. Palatine/Duke of Neuburg; 1569–1614	Magdalena d.1633	John Casimir of Zweibrucken d.1604 Montferrat; 1631–1637	François II, Duke of Nevers (c. 1540 – 1563); French Prince étranger and general	Jacques, Duke of Nevers (c. 1544 – 1564) rench Prince étranger and general	Henriette of Cleves (1542 – 1601)	Louis de Gonzague, Duke of Nevers (1539 – 2 1595); French Prince étranger,soldier, governor
John Sigismund (1572 - 1619); Margrave & Elector of Brandenburg; 1608–1619; Duke of Prussia,1618–1619	Anna of Prussia (1576 – 1625) awarded prot. Cleves, Mark & Ravensberg 1614–1619 settlement	Magdalene Sibylle of Prussia (1586 –1659) m. John George I, Elector of Saxony	William Wolfgang; Count Palatine & Duke of Neuburg; 1614–1653 awarded Cath. Jülich & Berg, desc.	Augustus, Count Palatine of Sulzbach (1582–1632); Catholic, desc. eventual heirs and inheritors & Counts Palatine and Bavaria	John Casimir; Count Palatine of Zweibrücken d.1652	Charles I Gonzaga (1580 – 1637); Duke of Mantua and Duke of Montferrat from 1627
George William; Margrave & Elector of Brandenburg; Duke of Prussia; 1619–1640	John George II; Elector of Saxony; 1656–1680

== Notable people from the Duchy of Jülich ==
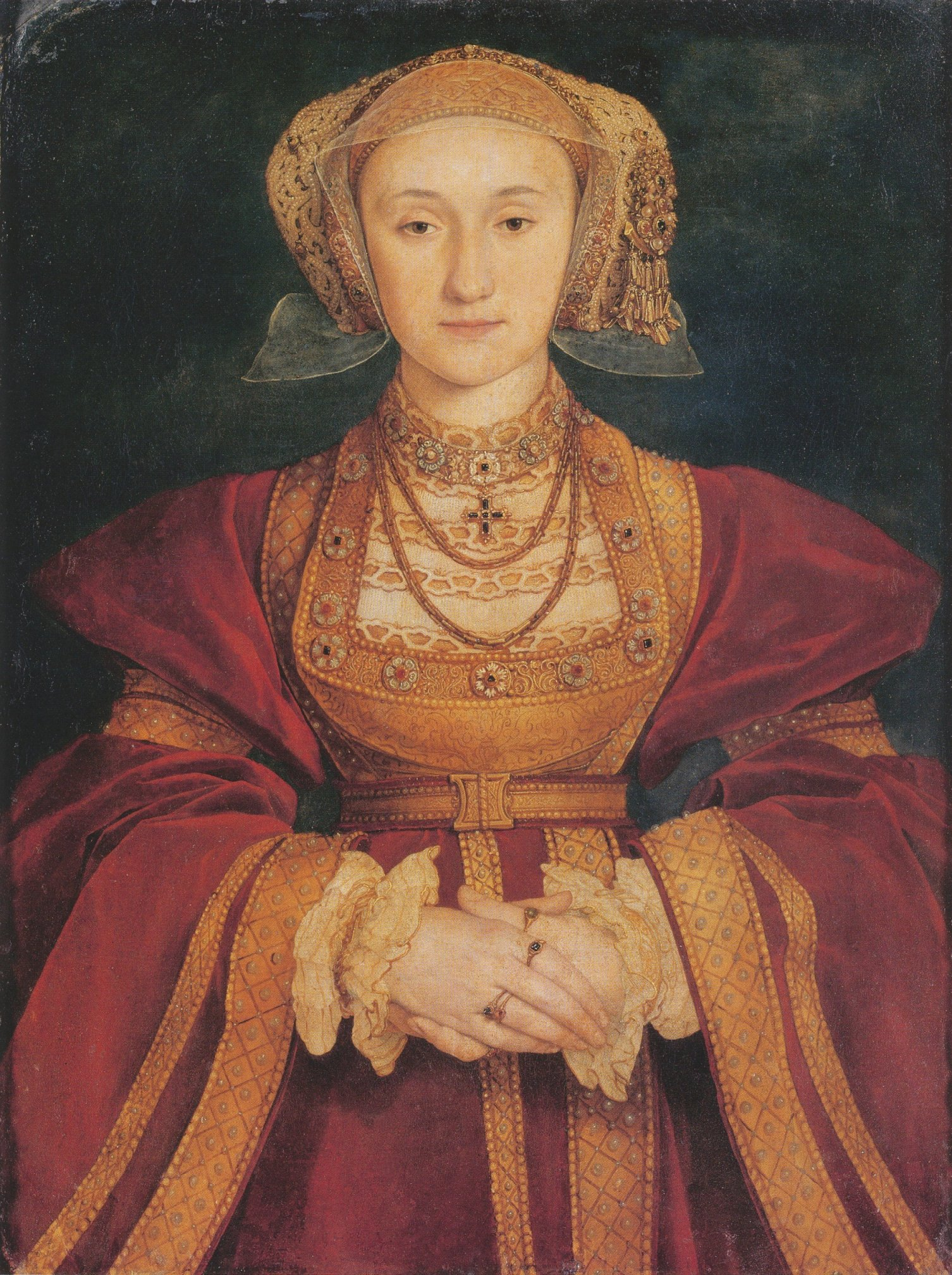
Anne of Cleves

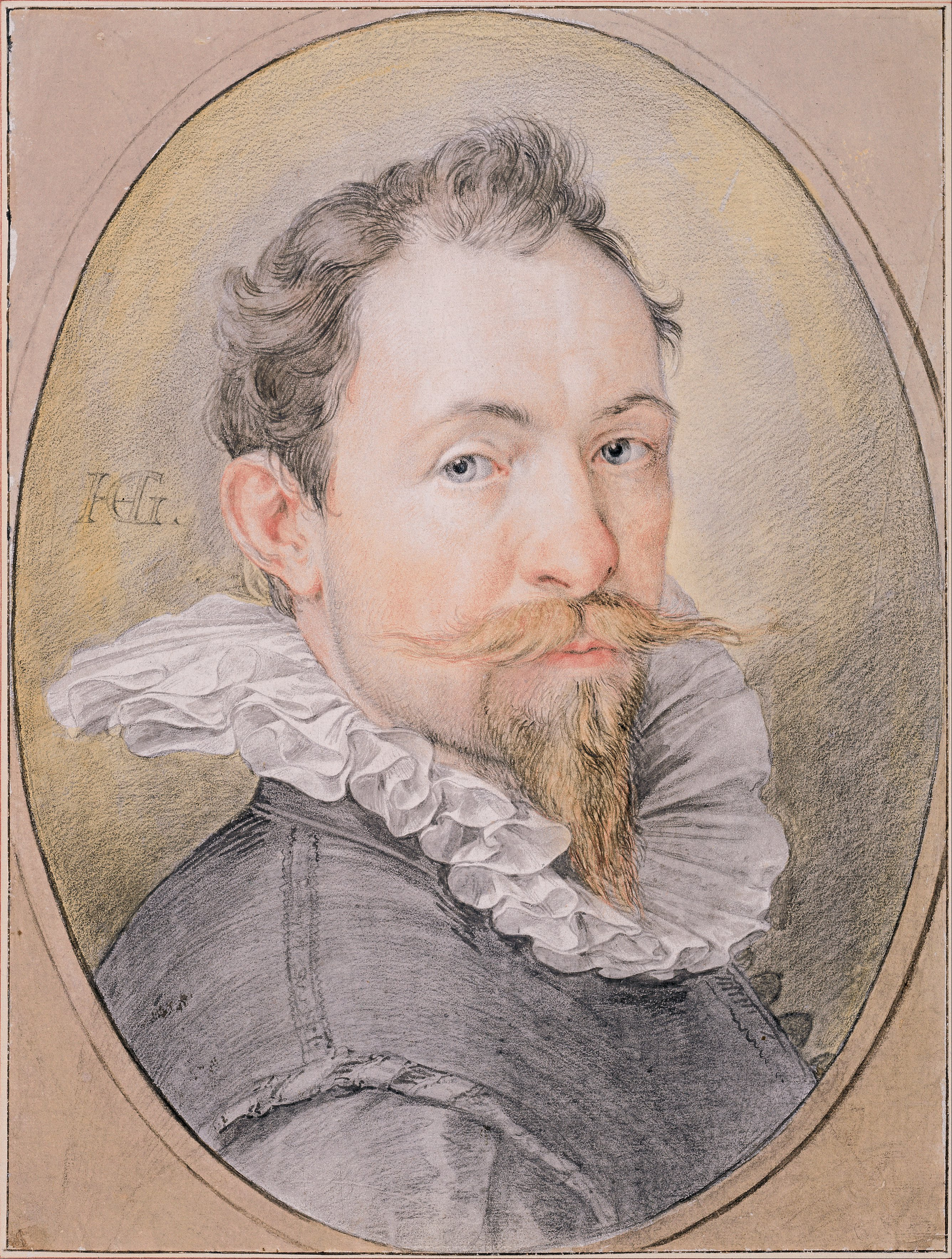
Hendrick Goltzius

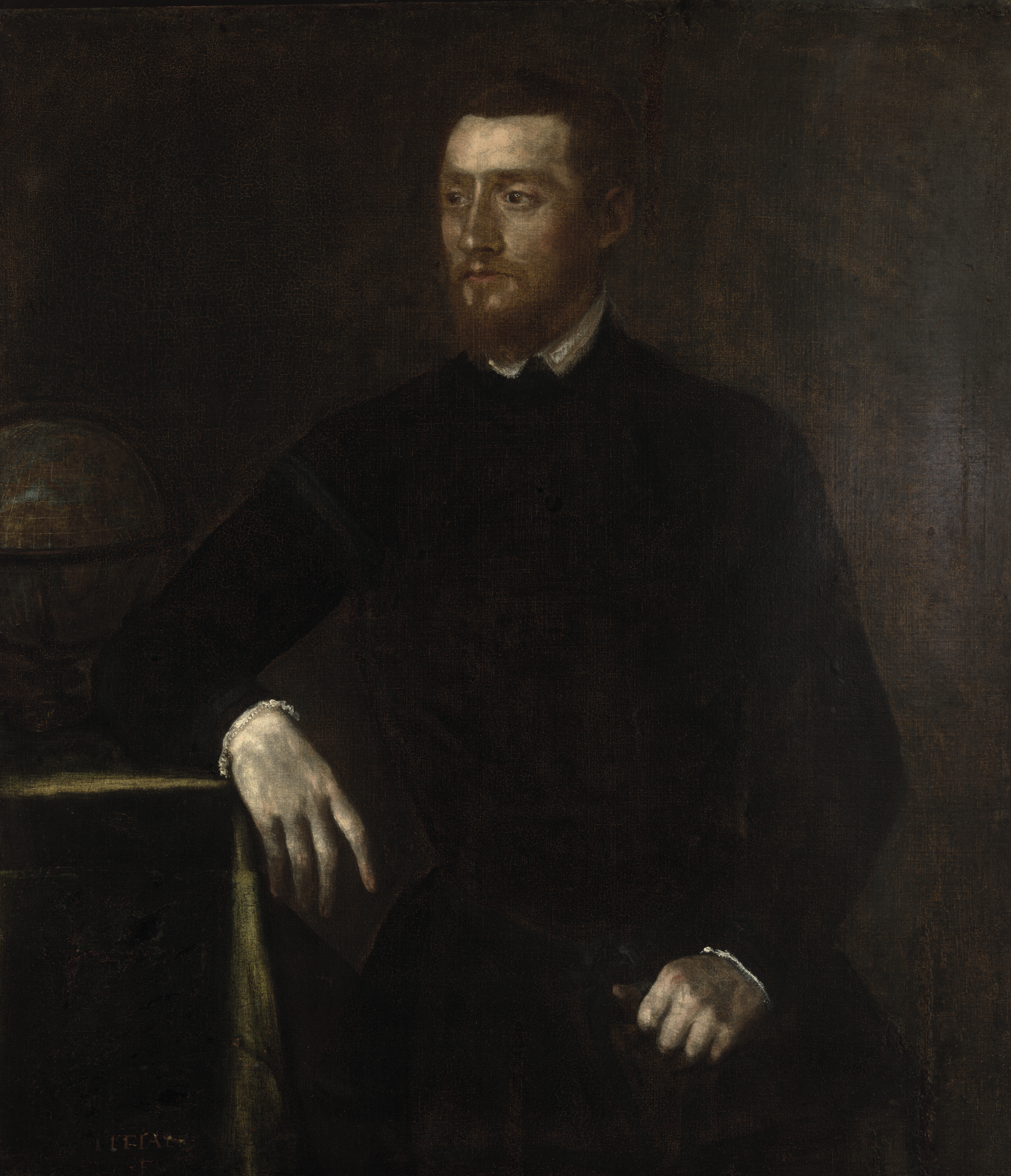
Mercator

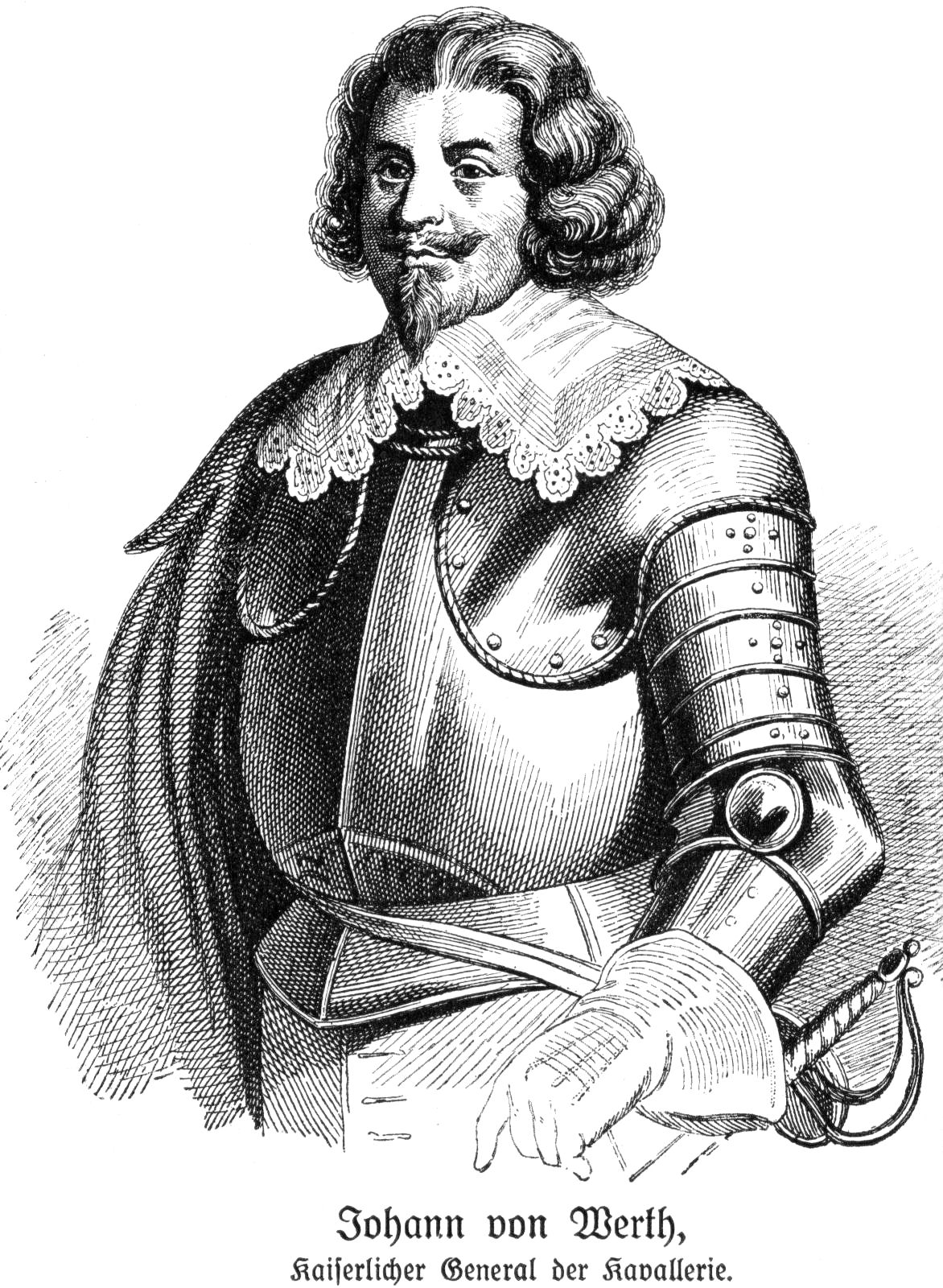
Johann von Werth

- Rabbi Isaac ben Meir of Duren, rabbi, author of Shaarei Dura (13th century)
- Carl Joseph Begas, painter, father of German sculptor Reinhold Begas (1794–1854)
- Gottfried Ludolf Camphausen, banker and politician, Prime Minister of Prussia (1803–1890)
- Anne of Cleves, noblewoman, Queen of England, fourth wife of Henry VIII (1515–1557)
- Peter Gustav Lejeune Dirichlet, mathematician (1805–1859)
- Statius von Düren, terracotta sculptor (1520–1570)
- Hendrick Goltzius, printmaker, draftsman, and painter (1558–1617)
- Hermann Heinrich Gossen, economist (1810–1858)
- Herman op den Graeff, Mennonite community leader (1585–1642)
- Friedrich Joseph Haass, physician, "holy doctor of Moscow" (1780–1853)
- Arnold von Harff, traveller and writer (1471–1505)
- Karl Heinzen, revolutionary author (1809–1880)
- Henriette Jügel, painter (1778–1850)
- Maria of Jülich-Berg, noblewoman, Duchess of Jülich-Berg, mother of Sibylle, Anne and Amalia (1491–1543)
- Hermann Löher, author (1595–1678)
- Nikolaus von Maillot de la Treille, military man holding the rank of Lieutenant General, Minister of War of the Kingdom of Bavaria (1774–1834)
- Heinrich von der Mark, military man holding the rank of Lieutenant General, Minister of War of the Kingdom of Bavaria (1782–1865)
- Jacob Masen, Jesuit priest, historian, dramatist and theologian (1606–1681)
- Gerardus Mercator, geographer, cosmographer and cartographer, whose parents were originally from Gangelt in the Duchy of Jülich (1512–1594)
- Jean-François Oeben, cabinetmaker, one of the most famous ébénistes, author of the Bureau du Roi and maternal grandfather of Eugène Delacroix
- Goschwin Nickel, Jesuit priest, the tenth Superior-General of the Society of Jesus (1582–1664)
- Saint Irmgardis, saint (1000–1065 or 1082/1089)
- Johann Wilhelm Schirmer, painter (1807–1863)
- Carl Caspar von Siebold, anatomist, surgeon, obstetrician and professor, considered the founder of modern academic surgery (1736–1807)
- Friedrich Spee, Jesuit priest, professor, and poet (1591–1635)
- Peter Stumpp, farmer and alleged serial killer accused of werewolfery (c. 1535–1589)
- Chrétien Urhan, violinist, violist, organist and composer (1790–1845)
- Johann von Werth, general of cavalry in the Thirty Years' War (1591–1652)
- Johann Weyer, physician and occultist (1515–1588)
- William I of Guelders and Jülich, Duke of Guelders and Jülich, known for his military activities and bellicose attitude (1364–1402)
