= William II of Ravensberg =

Count of Ravensberg

William VIII of Jülich
- Count of Ravensberg
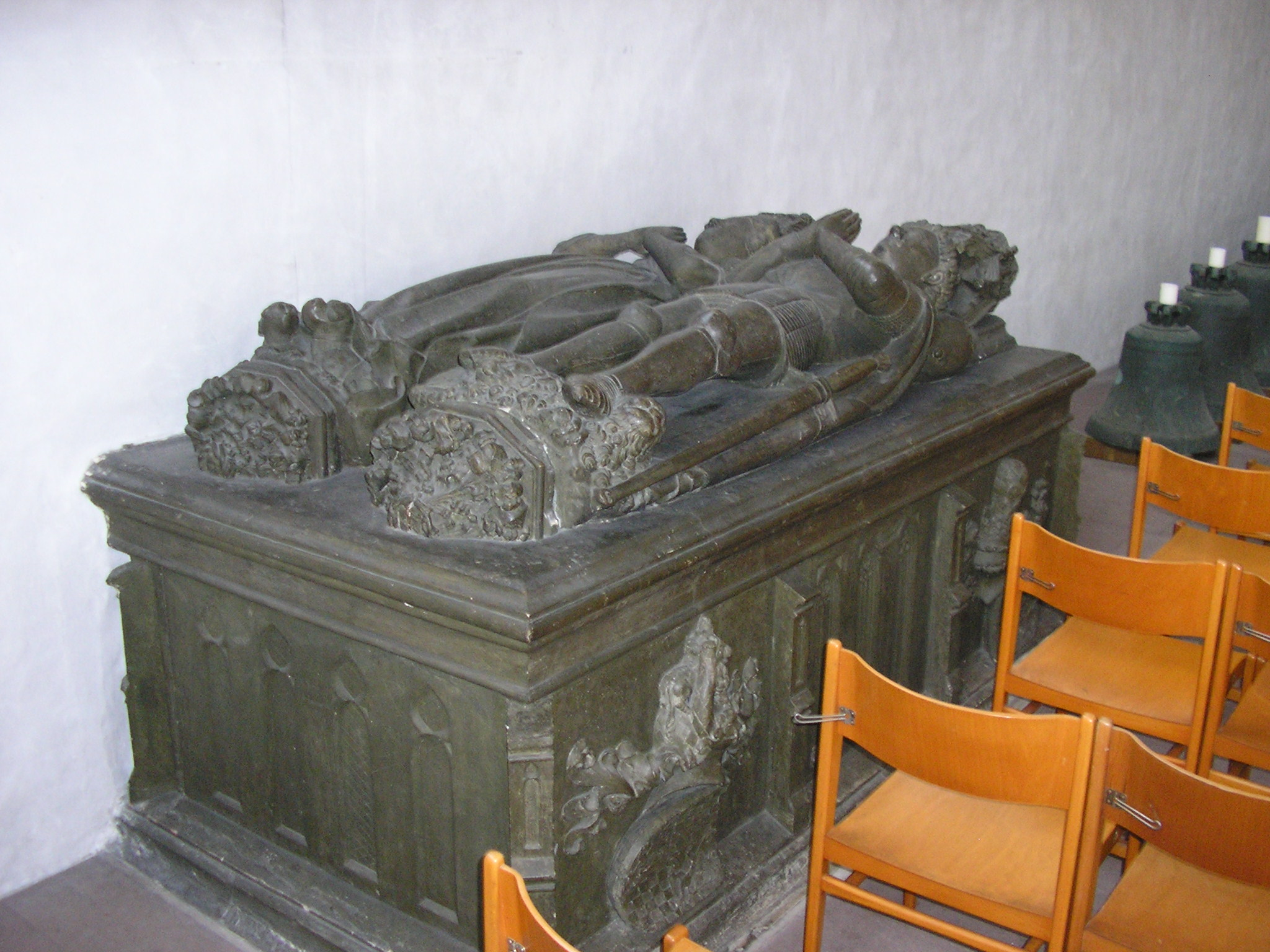
- Born: c. 1380
- Died: 22 November 1428
- Noble family: House of Jülich
- Spouse: Adelheid of Tecklenburg
- Issue: Gerhard VII, Duke of Jülich-Berg
- Father: William VII of Jülich, 1st Duke of Berg
- Mother: Anna of the Palatinate

William, Count of Ravensberg (c. 1380 – 22 November 1428) was the youngest son of William VII of Jülich, 1st Duke of Berg and Anna of the Palatinate.

Along with his brother, Adolf, William rebelled against his father but surrendered in 1404 and received his father's title as Count of Ravensberg which he held until his death in 1428.

In 1401, William was appointed Bishop of Paderborn by Pope Boniface IX through the influence of his uncle, Rupert, King of Germany. William's elder brother Rupert had held the same post from 1389–1394. Like his uncle, King Rupert, William was a follower of the Roman Popes. As Prince-Bishop, William aroused heavy unrest with his ecclesiastical reform effort and quarreled with Waldeck and Lippe, compelling acknowledgement of Paderborn's sovereignty over parts of Lippe. Despite territorial policy successes, he faced opposition and renounced Paderborn in 1414. He attempted to become Archbishop of Cologne but failed against Dietrich of Moers who also replaced William as Bishop of Paderborn. William then married Dietrich's niece, Adelheid of Tecklenburg, and became the father of the new line of the Dukes of Jülich-Berg and Counts of Ravensberg, when his brother Adolf died without an heir. William and Adelheid are buried in the Stiftskirche in Bielefeld.

== Family and children ==
On 19 February 1416, William married Adelheid of Tecklenburg, daughter of Nicholas II, Count of Tecklenburg and Elisabeth of Moers. They had one son:

1. Gerhard (c. 1416–1475), married Sophie of Saxe-Lauenburg, daughter of Bernard II, Duke of Saxe-Lauenburg

== Ancestry ==
16. Gerhard V of Jülich (bef 1250–1328)
8. William V, Duke of Jülich (c. 1299–1361)
17. Elizabeth of Brabant-Aarschot (c. 1280–1350/55)
4. Gerhard VI of Jülich (c. 1325–1360)
18. William I, Count of Hainaut (1286–1337)
9. Joanna of Hainaut (1311/13–1374)
19. Joan of Valois (c. 1294–1342)
2. William VII of Jülich, 1st Duke of Berg (c. 1348–1408)
20. Otto III of Ravensberg (1246–1305)
10. Otto IV, Count of Ravensberg (bef. 1276–1328)
21. Hedwig of Lippe (c. 1245–1315)
5. Margaret of Ravensberg (c. 1320–1389)
22. Henry of Berg, Lord of Windeck (bef. 1247–1290/95)
11. Margaret of Berg-Windeck (?–1339)
23. Agnes of Mark (bef. 1258–?)
1. William VIII of Jülich, Count of Ravensberg
24. Rudolf I, Duke of Bavaria (1274–1319)
12. Adolf, Count Palatine of the Rhine (1300–1327)
25. Mechtild of Nassau (bef. 1280–1323)
6. Rupert II, Elector Palatine (1325–1398)
26. Ludwig VI of Öttingen (c. 1267–1346)
13. Irmengarde of Öttingen (1304–1389)
27. Agnes of Württemberg (?–1317)
3. Anna of the Palatinate (1346–1415)
28. Frederick III of Sicily (1272–1337)
14. Peter II of Sicily (1305–1342)
29. Eleanor of Anjou (1289–1341)
7. Beatrice of Sicily (1326–1365)
30. Otto III of Carinthia (c. 1265–1310)
15. Elisabeth of Carinthia (1298–aft. 1347)
31. Euphemia of Liegnitz (c. 1278–1347)

William II of Ravensberg House of Jülich Born: c. 1380 Died: 22 November 1428
Preceded by Adolf	Count of Ravensberg; 1403–1428	Succeeded by Gerhard VII
