= Reginald IV =

Reginald IV may refer to:

- Reginald IV of Hainaut (c. 950–1013)
- Reinald IV, Duke of Guelders and Jülich (1365–1423)
