= William I of Guelders and Jülich =

William

Duke of Guelders
- Reign: 1377–1402
- Predecessor: Reginald III
- Successor: Reinald IV

Duke of Jülich
- Reign: 1393–1402
- Predecessor: William II
- Successor: Reginald IV
- Born: 5 March 1364
- Died: 16 February 1402 (aged 37); Arnhem, The Netherlands
- Spouse: Katherine of Bavaria
- House: House of Jülich
- Father: William II, Duke of Jülich
- Mother: Maria of Guelders

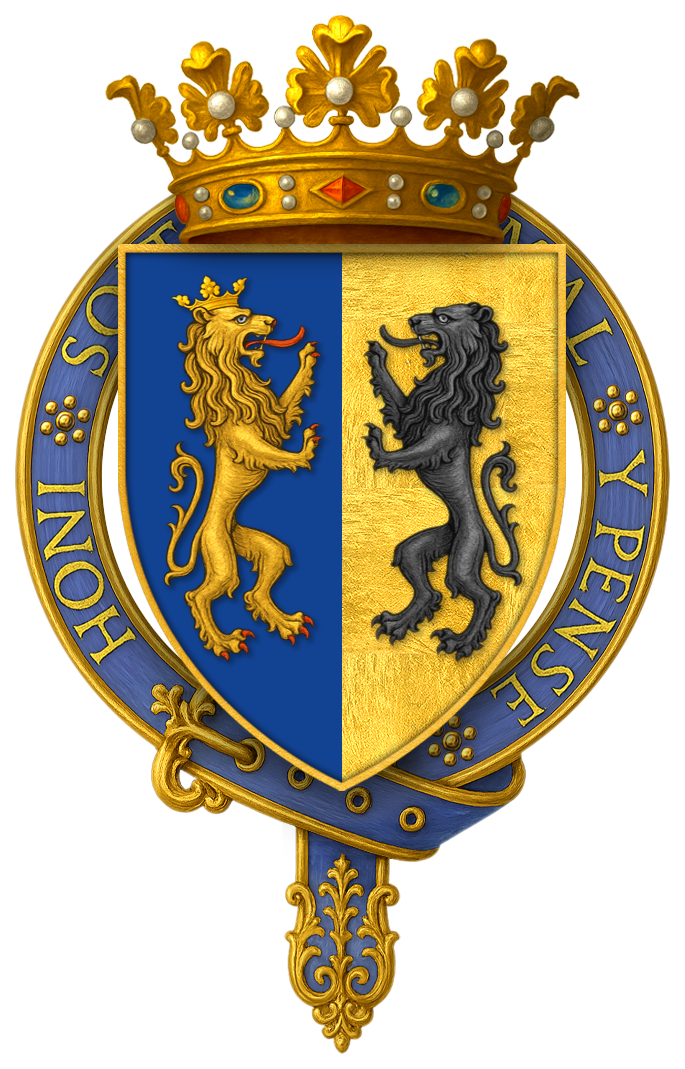
Gartered arms of William I, Duke of Guelders and Jülich

William (5 March 1364 – 16 February 1402, Arnhem) was Duke of Guelders, as William I, from 1377 and Duke of Jülich, as William III, from 1393. William was known for his military activities, participating in the Prussian crusade five times and battling with neighbors in France and Brabant throughout his rule. His allies included Holy Roman Emperors, Charles IV and Wenceslaus, Richard II of England, and Conrad Zöllner von Rothenstein, the Grand Master of the Teutonic Knights. During his reign the duchies of Guelders and Jülich were temporarily unified.

== Childhood and accession ==
Duchy of Guelders with Gelderland, about 1477

William was the eldest son of William II, Duke of Jülich and Maria of Guelders, half-sister of Reginald III, Duke of Guelders and Edward, Duke of Guelders. The brothers Edward and Reginald disputed the Duchy, with Edward taking control in 1361, imprisoning his brother. In 1366, Edward violated a peace made with Charles IV, Holy Roman Emperor and Wenceslaus I, Duke of Luxembourg (who was Duke of Brabant by marriage to Joanna, Duchess of Brabant) by not protecting Brabant merchants in the land between the Rhine and the Meuse who were under threat by armed men involved in the English-French wars. Wenceslaus's army then invaded and engaged in the Battle of Baesweiler in August 1371. Duke Edward, who was about to marry Katherine of Bavaria, daughter of Albert I, Duke of Bavaria, joined the battle and captured Duke Wenceslaus, but was wounded by an arrow and died. Reginald was immediately released, but died of ill health in three months, neither leaving heirs. This led to internal dissent over succession. Edward and Reginald were the only children of Reginald II, Duke of Guelders and Eleanor of Woodstock, daughter of Edward II of England, and Reginald's only male heirs. Reginald II's first marriage was to Sophia Berthout, Lady of Mechelen, which led to four daughters. Two daughters, Maria and Mathilde, then made claim to the title. Mathilde's claim was based on her position as eldest daughter. Maria based her claim on William, who was seven at the time, being the only male representative of the blood of Guelders. Mathilde quickly married John II, Count of Blois, and this grievance precipitated into the War of the Succession of Guelders. William's father, William II, Duke of Jülich, was granted the right to administer the duchy by Emperor Charles IV during his son's minority. At this time a marriage was arranged between the young William and Katherine of Bavaria, who had been betrothed to his uncle Edward. However, as part of the reconciliation between the houses of Blois and Jülich, some of Guelders remained under the control of Mathilde, and the upper district was under control of Jülich.

Map of the Lower Rhenish–Westphalian Circle around 1560, Duchy of Jülich highlighted in red

In 1377, upon the boys majority, Emperor Charles IV granted Guelders and Zutphen to William, the son of William II, but it took two more years to consolidate his authority over the entire duchy. He immediately received homage from Arnhem, Nijmegen, and the upper district. However, William did not recognize all of the municipal privileges granted by his half-uncle, Duke Reginald. His rule was opposed by some areas, notably Betuwe and Veluwe, and by nobles led by Frederik van Heeckeren van der Eze, who had supported Mathilde (and Reginald) in comparison to nobles led by Gijsbert V van Bronckhorst, Heer van Bronckhorst who had supported Edward and Maria. William consolidated control after besieging a number of castles of Hekeren nobles. His father accompanied him in a victory over the lord of Voorst near Gennep and Reginald van Brederede van Gennep, the chief leader of the Hekerens. With this, Mathilde and John of Blois renounced all claim to Guelders and Zutphen on 24 March 1379. That fall William married Catherine.

== Wars and rule ==
William's rule is cited as an example of the chivalry of that time in France and the Netherlands. He put on many tournaments and sports at arms, and has been called an ideal knight. He participated in crusades against the Lithuanians in East Prussia in the territories of the Teutonic Order with William of Holland, first in 1383, and later in 1388–89 and 1393. He was an ally of the English in the Hundred Years' War. And continuing the enmity from the War of the Succession of Guelders, he fought successfully in 1386–1388 with his father against the Duchy of Brabant, which was allied with France and Burgundy. William's army advanced far into Brabant, although his army was stalled in a battle near Grave, North Brabant in July 1388. His actions and alliance with England have been seen as reckless, and raised the ire of Charles VI of France, who advanced on Guelders with an army of 100,000. William narrowly escaped disaster with an apology, but his stand against the French made him famous throughout Europe.

== Capture in Pomerania ==
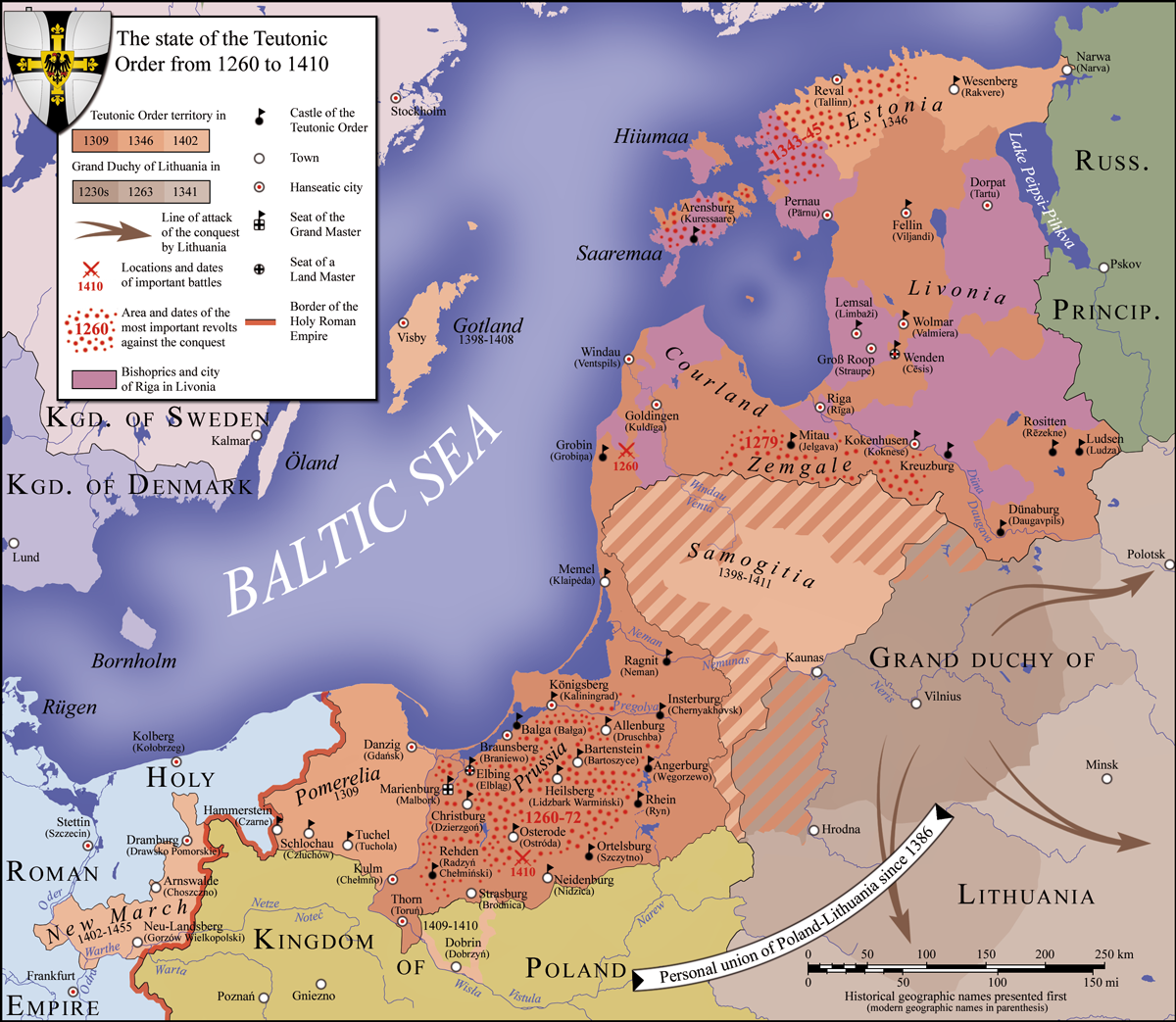
Map of the Teutonic state in 1410

Shortly after his campaigns in Brabant, William departed again for Prussia with a large army. He was quite successful in this crusade, but was taken prisoner near Stolpe in Pomerania, the land of Wartislaw VII, Duke of Pomerania. He was taken to the castle of Falkenburg, where he stayed for six months. Conrad Zöllner von Rothenstein, the grand master of the Teutonic Order, won his freedom. William demanded that his freedom be formally declared, but the Pomeranian was embarrassed by his defeat. In fear of the citizens, the Pomeranian nobleman hid in a tree on one side of a brook and shouted his declaration of William's freedom to William and the Teutonic Knights who were on the other side. William then returned to Guelders by way of Bohemia, where he visited his brother-in-law, Wenceslaus, King of the Romans.

== Return to Europe ==
In the spring of 1390 William went to England and was made a Knight of the Garter by Richard II of England - and was the first continental nobleman to be honored in this way. The next year he made a pilgrimage to the Holy Land, and in the summer of 1391 he joined a French fleet to fight Moorish pirates of the coast of Barbary. He returned to the crusades in Prussia in the winter of 1392 and 1393, and inherited the Duchy of Jülich (as William III) in 1393 upon the death of his father. This involved him in new difficulties with neighbors in Cologne, Berg, Cleves, and Mark. In 1399, further hostilities with Brabant resulted finally in cession of Grave to Guelders. He also participated in a fourth campaign against the Prussians in 1399, and then a fifth crusade.

As part of his involvement in the Hundred Years' War, he played an important role as he was in control of the coronation road between Frankfurt and Aachen, which passed through his territory. He was thus able to prevent the coronation of Rupert of Germany in 1400. In the fall of 1401 William was intending to prepare to join his brother in law, John van Arkel, in his war against Duke Albert in Holland. However, he took sick, and died 16 February 1402.

== Legacy ==
Had William lived longer, it is likely that he would have continued to resist Burgundian influence in the Netherlands, and his legacy was heavily tied with his external wars. Although these wars came at a cost for the people of Guelders and Jülich, his activity did allow for his counties to thrive economically and to unite against an external enemy. As evidence the political parties of the Heeckeren and the Bronckhorstens were reconciled.
After his death, his only brother Reginald IV succeeded him as duke of a united Jülich and Guelders-Zutphen. Reginald was less warlike, although tensions continued with Cleves over Lymers and Zevenaar, and the town of Emmerich was ceded to Cleves. Upon the death of Reginald, also without issue, the Duchy of Jülich went to Adolf, Duke of Jülich-Berg, son of William VII of Jülich, 1st Duke of Berg, and grandson of Gerhard VI of Jülich, Count of Berg and Ravensberg, brother of William's father. The Duchy of Guelders-Zutphen went to Arnold of Egmond, son of Maria van Arkel, daughter of William's sister, Joanna, and John V, Lord of Arkel.

== Personal retinue ==
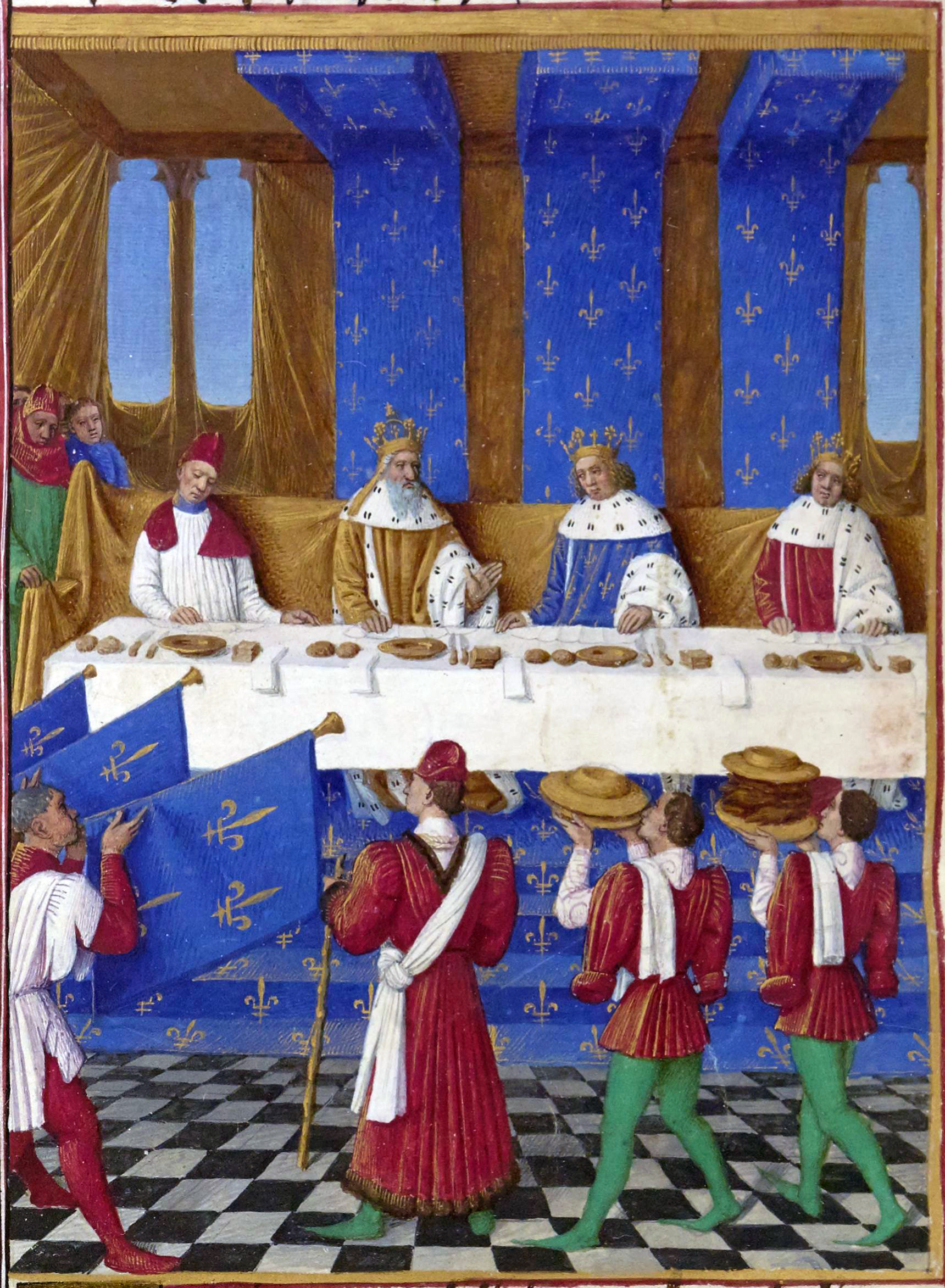
Example of Banquet given in Paris in 1378

The court of Guelders at the end of the 14th century and beginning of the 15th century was quite celebrated, including numerous physicians, barbers, falconers and cooks. Among his retinue, William kept head cooks Evarardus Bolte, Crumken, and Elbertus van Eijll (who continued as master cook for William's successor, Reginald IV). Elbertus may have been the grandson of Evarardus Bolte, and a genealogie of Elbertus' grandson in about 1440 claimed that Elbertus married a bastard daughter of Duke William named Margaret. In 1396, during a visit to the English king, the cooks entered a cooking contest against their English counterparts led by then head cook, Crumken.

William kept many physicians. In 1388/89, three physicians are mentioned: Arnt van Auwel, Clais, and Peter, as well as a healer of wounds, Jan van Asperen. Later, Peter van Orten and Giesbert van Berg were separately brought into William's household after serving as professors of Medicine at the University of Cologne. Giesbert managed to work as a physician to Duchess Johanna and Antoine, Duke of Brabant, enemies of Guelders. When sick in 1401 and 1402, other doctors were called: Derich Distel, Volpart, Evert vander Eze, and an English physician, Thomas.

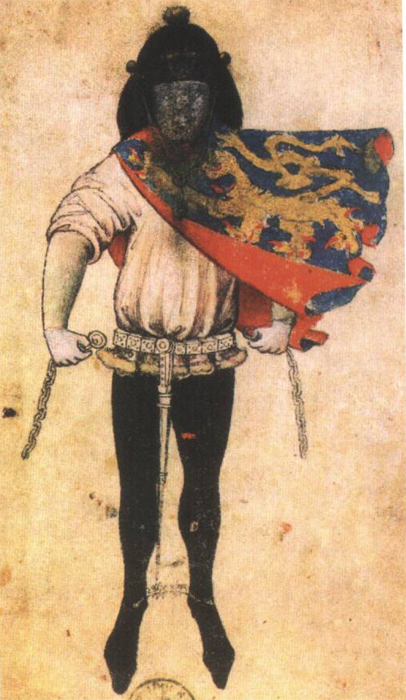
Portrait of Claes Heynenzoon, the Herald Guelders

William had many assistants who administered his lands while he was on campaigns. In 1388 during campaigns in Prussia, William left Henry of Steenbergen to administer Jülich and Guelders. In 1390 while visiting the King of England, he left Johann von der Velde called Honselaerr, who had fought with Duke William against Brabant in Grave.

His musicians included Claes Heynenzoon, called Herald Gelre, also famous for his Wapenboek Gelre (Gelre Armorial), a book containing drawings of the coats of arms of many famous nobles, an artist called Middelen, and Henric the Bohemian.

== Wife and children ==
William married in 1379 Catharina of Bavaria (1361 – 11 November 1400), daughter of Albert I, Duke of Bavaria, who had been betrothed to his uncle Edward, Duke of Guelders. The marriage remained childless, and Katherine died in Hattem on 11 November 1400. Upon his death in 1402, William was buried next to his wife at Monnikhuizen monastery near Arnhem.

William had illegitimate children including:

- Margaret, aforementioned wife of Elbert van Eijll
- Johanna of Guelders-Jülich, married Johan VI of Kuyk
- Johan of Guelders, son of Mechtild van Brackel, married Hadewig van Sinderen
- Maria of Jülich, married Johan van Buren, and had issue.

Vacant Succession war Title last held by Reginald III	Duke of Guelders; 1379–1402	Succeeded by Reginald (IV)
Preceded by William II	Duke of Jülich; 1393–1402	Succeeded by Reginald (IV)
