= Wilhelm von Gennep =

14th-century elector-archbishop of Cologne

Wilhelm von Gennep (died 15 September 1362) was Elector-Archbishop of Cologne from 1349 to 1362.

== Life ==
Wilhelm was a member of a minor comital family from the region of the Meuse (Maas) valley. He was active in Cologne as the elector-archbishop's secretary under his predecessor Walram von Jülich and was one of his most important advisers.

After Walram's death, Wilhelm was elected archbishop. The King and Emperor Charles IV was opposed to his nomination, but Wilhelm had the support and protection of Brabant and France, and was duly appointed by Pope Clement VI.

Wilhelm was an unusually efficient ruler, and soon managed to stabilise the archbishopric's financial position, which was the prerequisite for the effective exercise of its territorial powers. His energetic internal politics formed the basis for (by and large) unwarlike and successful foreign politics, which culminated in an intensive engagement in imperial politics. He not only established political relations with France, England and north-west Europe, but was apparently involved in the formulation of the Golden Bull of Charles IV in 1356.

His unceasing activity quickly exhausted Wilhelm and he died on 15 September 1362 in Cologne, where he was buried in a monumental tomb which he had prepared for himself in the Chapel of the Cross (Kreuzkapelle) in Cologne Cathedral.

Wilhelm promoted the construction of the cathedral, and supported the cathedral building guild of the time. He boosted the financing of the building works by obtaining reliefs for the archbishopric from the pope. He also showed a certain respect, not universally shared, towards his predecessor in that he had an equally magnificent tomb built for him too.

== Sources and external links ==
- de.Wkisource: ADB:Wilhelm_von_Gennep (in German)
- Tomb of Wilhelm von Gennep: photo
- Cologne Cathedral website: tomb of Wilhelm von Gennep (in German)

William of Gennep Counts of Gennep Born: unknown Died: 15 September 1362 in Cologne
Catholic Church titles
Regnal titles
Preceded by Walram von Jülich	Archbishop-Elector of Cologne and Duke of Westphalia and Angria; 1349–1362	Succeeded by Adolf III von der Mark
