= William II, Duke of Jülich =

- Born: c. 1327
- Died: 13 December 1393
- Noble family: House of Jülich
- Spouse: Maria of Guelders
- Issue: William I of Guelders and Jülich; Reinald IV, Duke of Guelders and Jülich; Joanna
- Father: William I, Duke of Jülich
- Mother: Joanna of Hainaut

William II, Duke of Jülich (c. 1327 – 13 December 1393) was the second Duke of Jülich and the sixth William in the House of Jülich. He was the second son of William I of Jülich and Joanna of Hainaut.

William was co-ruler from 1343. He quarreled greatly with his father and imprisoned him from 1349-1351. He tried for many years in Holland-Zeeland to enforce claims against the House of Wittelsbach but failed. When his father died in 1361, William became the second Duke of Jülich, his elder brother Gerhard having predeceased their father. He led the traditional feuds of the House of Jülich and lost Kaiserswerth and Zülpich, among others. William intervened in favor of Edward in the catastrophic war of succession between his brothers-in-law Reinald and Edward for control of the Duchy of Guelders. He took part in the 1371 Battle of Baesweiler (in which Edward was mortally wounded) and captured Wenceslaus I, Duke of Luxembourg. His brother-in-law Reinald died later in 1371 and as neither Reinald nor Edward left heirs, another fight for the succession of Guelders arose between William and his wife Maria (sister to Reinald and Edward) and Maria's sister Mathilde, wife of John II, Count of Blois. In 1377, Emperor Charles IV granted Guelders to William's son William, but the title was not secured until 1379. Among other territories, William acquired Monschau-Montjoie, Randerath and Linnich.

== Family and children ==
William married in December 1362 to Maria of Guelders (c. 1328 – November 1397), daughter of Reinald II of Guelders. They had three children:

1. William (1364–1402)
2. Reinald (c. 1365 – 1423)
3. Joanna, married John V, Lord of Arkel. She succeeded her brother Reinald as Duke of Guelders and was the grandmother of Arnold, Duke of Guelders

== Ancestry ==
Ancestors of William II, Duke of Jülich

16. William III of Jülich
8. William IV, Count of Jülich
17. Matilda of Limburg
4. Gerhard V of Jülich
18. Gerard III, Count of Guelders
9. Richardis of Guelders
19. Margaret of Brabant
2. William I, Duke of Jülich
20. Henry III, Duke of Brabant
10. Godfrey of Brabant
21. Adelaide of Burgundy
5. Elizabeth of Brabant-Aarschot
22. Hervé IV, Lord of Vierzon
11. Jeanne of Vierzon
23. Jeanne de Brenne
1. William II, Duke of Jülich
24. John I, Count of Hainaut
12. John II, Count of Holland
25. Adelaide of Holland
6. William I, Count of Hainaut
26. Henry V of Luxembourg
13. Philippa of Luxembourg
27. Margaret of Bar
3. Joanna of Hainaut
28. Philip III of France
14. Charles of Valois
29. Isabella of Aragon
7. Joan of Valois
30. Charles II of Naples
15. Margaret, Countess of Anjou
31. Maria of Hungary

== Sources ==
- Boffa, Sergio (2010). "Baesweiler, Battle of". In Rogers, Clifford J. (ed.). The Oxford Encyclopedia of Medieval Warfare and Military Technology. Vol. 1. Oxford University Press. pp. 103–104.
- Stein, Robert (2017). Magnanimous Dukes and Rising States: The Unification of the Burgundian Netherlands, 1380-1480. Oxford University Press.

William II, Duke of Jülich House of Jülich Born: c. 1327 Died: 13 December 1393
Preceded by William I	Duke of Jülich; 1361–1393	Succeeded by William III
