= Joanna of Hainaut =

Duchess consort of Jülich

Joanna of Hainault
- Born: 1315
- Died: 1374 (aged 58–59)
- Noble family: House of Avesnes
- Spouse: William V, Duke of Jülich
- Issue Detail: Gerhard VI of Jülich, Count of Berg and Ravensberg; William II, Duke of Jülich
- Father: William I, Count of Hainaut
- Mother: Joan of Valois

Joanna of Hainault (c. 1312–1374) was a Duchess of Jülich by marriage to William V, Duke of Jülich. She was the third daughter of William I, "The Good" Count of Hainaut, and Joan of Valois. She was a younger sister of Philippa of Hainault, Queen of England, and Margaret II, Countess of Hainault.

== Life ==
After her marriage, Joanna visited her mother Joan of Valois in January or February to May 1326, and the mother and daughter visited Joanna's sister Philipa, Queen of England, in 1329.

== Marriage and issue ==
Joanna married William V, Duke of Jülich on 26 February 1324 in Cologne. Their children were as follows:

- Gerhard VI of Jülich, Count of Berg and Ravensberg, married Margaret of Ravensberg, heiress of Berg and Ravensberg. Grandfather of Adolph I, Duke of Cleves.
- William II, Duke of Jülich, married Maria of Guelders.
- Richardis of Jülich, married Count Engelbert III of the Mark.
- Philippa of Jülich, married Godfrey II of Heinsberg.
- Reinold of Jülich.
- Joanna of Jülich, married William I, Count of Isenburg-Wied.
- Isabella of Jülich, married firstly John Plantagenet, 3rd Earl of Kent and secondly Eustace d'Aubrichecourt.
