= Katherine of Bavaria =

- Duchess consort of Guelders and Jülich
- Tenure: 1379-1400
- Born: 1361
- Died: 1400 (aged 38–39); Hattem
- Spouse: Edward of Guelders; William I of Gelders and Jülich
- House: House of Wittelsbach
- Father: Albert I, Duke of Bavaria
- Mother: Margaret of Brieg

Katherine of Bavaria (c. 1361–1400 AD, Hattem), was the eldest child of Albert I, Duke of Bavaria and his first wife Margaret of Brieg. She was Duchess of Guelders and Jülich by her marriage to William I of Guelders and Jülich.

== Family ==
Katherine was the eldest of seven child born to her parents. She and her siblings all lived to adulthood. Her siblings were: Joanna of Bavaria; wife of Wenceslaus, King of the Romans, Margaret of Bavaria; wife of John the Fearless, William VI, Count of Holland, Albert II, Duke of Bavaria-Straubing, John, Count of Holland and Johanna Sophia of Bavaria; wife of Albert IV, Duke of Austria and mother of Albert II of Germany.

== Marriages ==
Katherine was betrothed in 1368 to Edward, Duke of Guelders, son of Reginald II of Guelders and Eleanor of England. However, Edward died when Katherine was only ten years of age.

Katherine was subsequently married in 1379 to William I of Guelders and Jülich, son of William II, Duke of Jülich. Her husband was Edward's nephew.

This marriage produced no children and Katherine died in 1400, leaving William a widower. William died two years after Katherine and was succeeded by his brother, Reinald IV, Duke of Guelders and Jülich.
