= County of Ravensberg =

Historical county of the Holy Roman Empire

Coordinates: 52°05′31.79″N 8°34′14.55″E

County of Ravensberg Grafschaft Ravensberg (German)
- 1140–1810
- Coat of arms

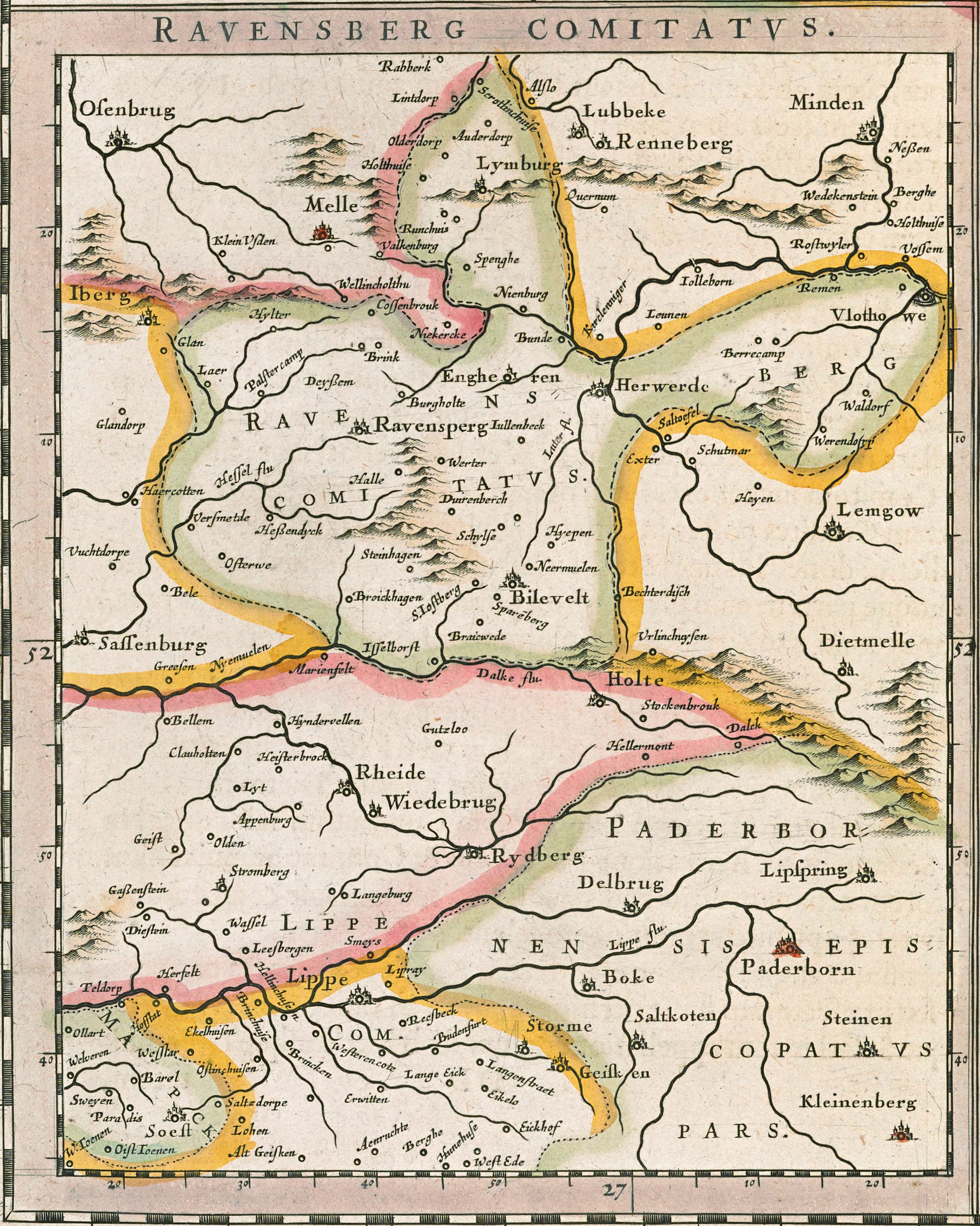
- Contemporary map from the 17th century

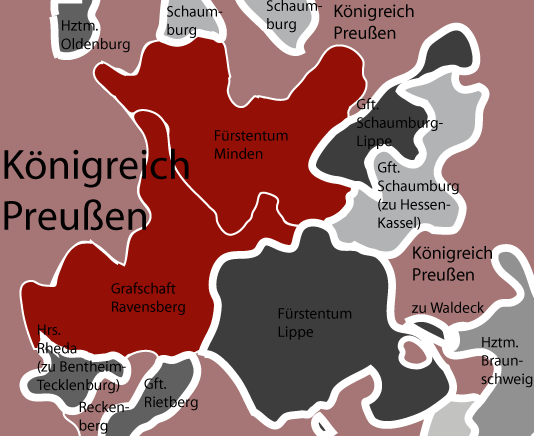
- Minden-Ravensberg in 1806
- Status: County
- Capital: Bielefeld
- Government: Principality
- Historical era: Middle Ages
  - Otto I, Count of Ravensberg: 1140
  - Gerhard I, Count of Berg and Ravensberg: 1338
  - Joined Westphalian Imperial Circle: 1500
  - John III, Duke of Jülich-Cleves-Berg: 1521
  - To Brandenburg-Prussia by Treaty of Xanten: 1614
  - Disestablished: 1810
| Preceded by | Succeeded by |
| County of Calvelage | Minden-Ravensberg |
- Today part of: Germany

The County of Ravensberg (German: Grafschaft Ravensberg) was a historical county of the Holy Roman Empire. Its territory was in present-day eastern Westphalia, Germany, at the foot of the Osning or Teutoburg Forest.

== History ==
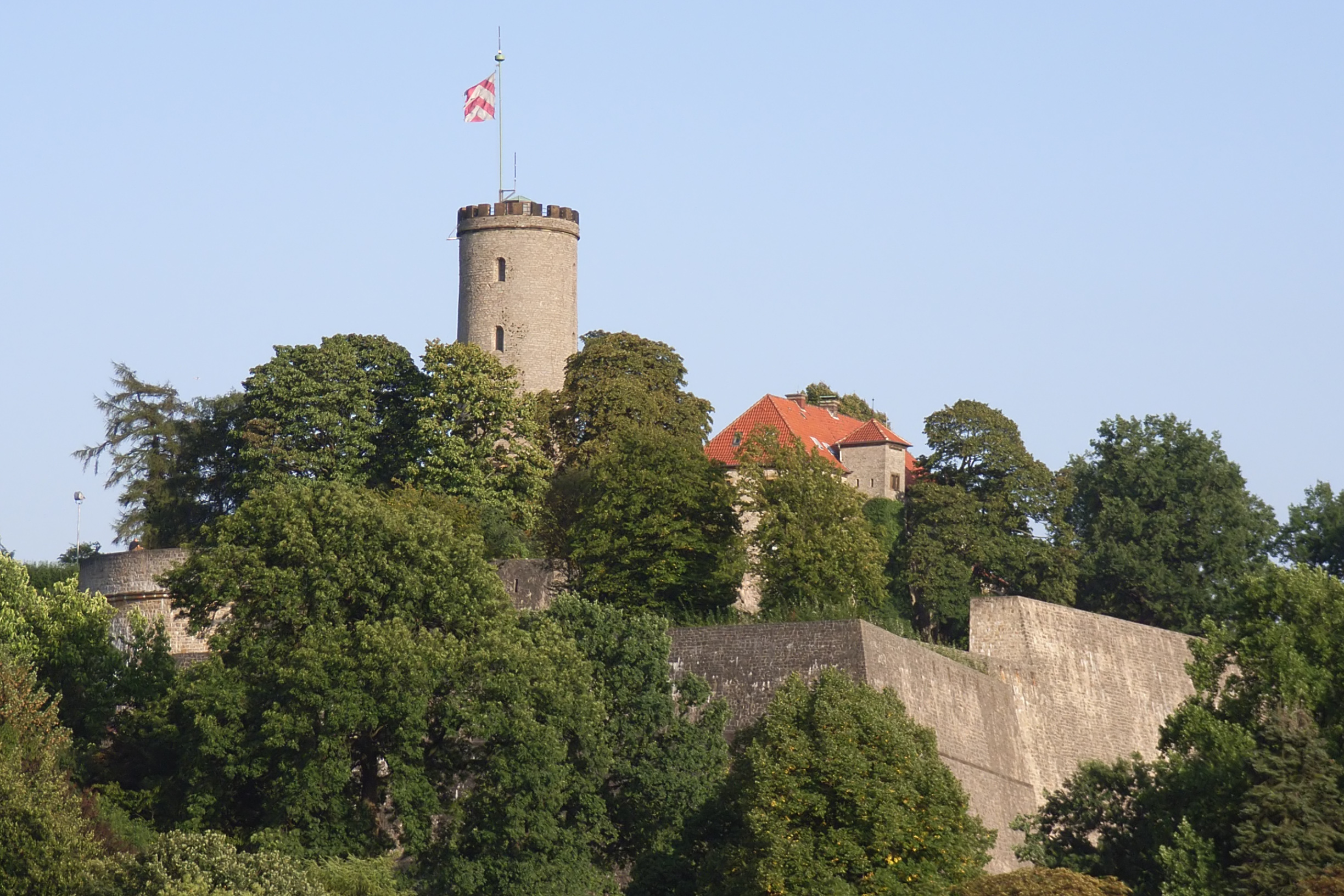
Sparrenburg Castle

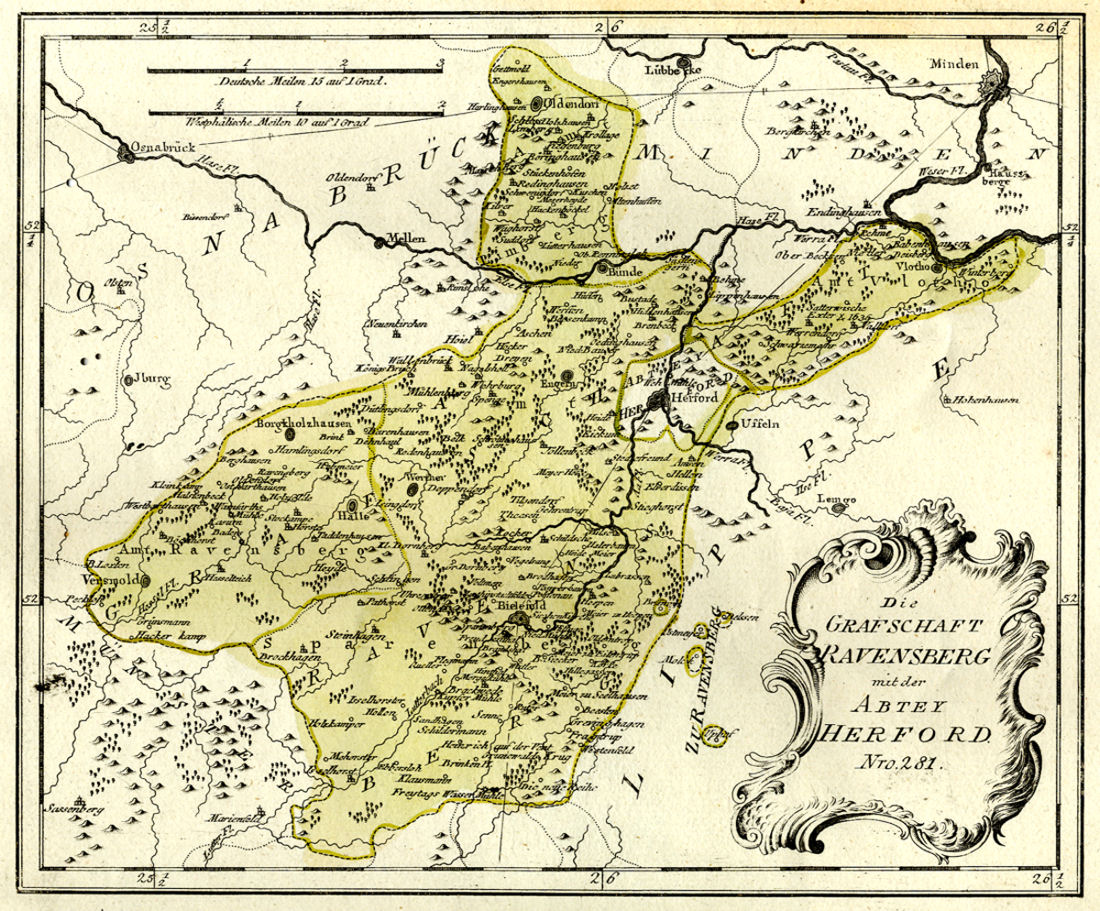
Historic map of the County of Ravensberg (1798)

Ravensberg was first mentioned in the 12th century; its first seat was Ravensberg Castle. The Counts of Ravensberg then had Sparrenberg Castle built in Bielefeld c. 1240–50, which they made their seat. They also owned Limberg Castle near Preußisch Oldendorf.

The county was later inherited by the Duchy of Berg in 1346, which in turn became part of the Duchy of Jülich-Berg in 1423, and ultimately the United Duchies of Jülich-Cleves-Berg in 1521.

After the War of the Jülich succession, in the Treaty of Xanten in 1614, the County of Ravensberg came to the Margraviate of Brandenburg, which became the Kingdom of Prussia in 1701, and was administered within Minden-Ravensberg from 1719–1807, when it was dissolved during the Napoleonic Wars.

Aside from Bielefeld, other communities in the County of Ravensberg were Borgholzhausen, Halle, Steinhagen, Versmold, Werther, Isselhorst (now part of Gütersloh), Enger, Hiddenhausen, Rödinghausen, Spenge, Herford (except for Falkendiek), Bünde (except for Dünne and Spradow), Vlotho (except for Uffeln), Kirchlengern south of the Werre, Preußisch Oldendorf (except for Hedem and Lashorst) and Bad Oeynhausen south of the Werre.

== Rulers ==
=== House Calvelage-Ravensberg ===
- Until 1144 Hermann I
- c. 1140 – c. 1170 Otto I
- c. 1160 – c. 1180 Heinrich
- c. 1175 – c. 1220 Hermann II
- c. 1220 – 1244 Otto II
- c. 1220 – 1249 Ludwig
- 1249–1306 Otto III
- 1306–1328 Otto IV
- 1328–1346 Bernard

=== House of Jülich ===
1348–1395 in Personal union with Berg, since 1437 with Jülich-Berg

- 1346–1360 Gerhard I
- 1360–1408 William I, lets his 2 sons rule :
- 1395–1403 Adolf
- 1403–1428 William II
- 1428–1475 Gerhard II
- 1475–1511 William III

=== House of La Marck, Dukes ===
from 1521 a part of the United Duchies of Jülich-Cleves-Berg

- 1511–1539 John
- 1539–1592 William V
- 1592–1609 John William I

=== House of Hohenzollern ===
from 1614 Margraves of Brandenburg and Kings of Prussia

- 1614–1619 John Sigismund of Hohenzollern
- 1619–1640 George William, son
- 1640–1688 Frederick William I, son
- 1688–1713 Frederick I, son, King in Prussia from 1701
- 1713–1740 Frederick William I, son, King in Prussia
- 1740–1786 Frederick II, son, King of Prussia from 1772
- 1786–1797 Frederick William II, nephew, King of Prussia
- 1797–1807 Frederick William III, King of Prussia

To France by the 1807 Treaty of Tilsit, incorporated into the Kingdom of Westphalia

== See also ==
- Ostwestfalen-Lippe
