= Adolf, Duke of Jülich-Berg =

First duke of Jülich-Berg

Adolf, Duke of Jülich-Berg (c. 1370 – 14 July 1437), was the first Duke of the combined duchies of Jülich and Berg. He was the son of William II of Berg and Anna of the Palatinate.

In 1397, Adolf rebelled against his father along with his brother William, ravaged Düsseldorf and imprisoned his father. He was outlawed and was subsequently subdued in 1405. Upon his father's death in 1408, Adolf became the 2nd Duke of Berg. Adolf fought against Lorraine and other pretenders for Bar but surrendered after his capture in 1417. His father's cousin, Reginald, Duke of Jülich and Guelders, had no heirs and upon his death in 1423, Adolf succeeded him in three-fourths of the Duchy, the fourth quarter (called Jülicher Quart) was inherited by John II of Loon, Lord of Heinsberg and Löwenberg, grandson of the first duke of Jülich, William V. The dukedom of Jülich passed to Adolf, thus becoming the first duke of the combined duchies of Jülich and Berg. John II. of Loon-Heinsberg was than also called Lord of Jülich. Adolf also began a year-long hereditary war against the House of Egmond for the dukedom of Guelders but could not win even with financial support from Sigismund, Holy Roman Emperor, who supported Adolf in this fight despite Adolf's opposition to Sigismund's coronation at Aachen in 1414. Adolf supported the Roman candidate in the Council of Constance which ended the Western Schism. He traditionally fought against the Archbishop of Cologne. He later secured Monschau-Montjoie and in 1428 he seized Lievandal-Wevelinghoven.

Adolf had only one son who died before him so after Adolf's death in 1437, the dukedom of Jülich-Berg passed to his nephew Gerhard, son of his brother William. Adolf died in Cologne on 14 July 1437 and is buried at Great St. Martin Church, Cologne.

== Family and children ==
In 1397, Adolf was betrothed to Catherine of Brunswick-Lüneburg, daughter of Henry the Mild, Duke of Brunswick-Lüneburg but this marriage was never consummated. In 1400 Adolf was married at the Château de Dun to Yolande of Bar (the younger) (c. 1378 – 10 January 1421), daughter of Robert I, Duke of Bar and Marie of Valois. On 14 February 1430 in Mainz, Adolf married a second time to Elisabeth of Bavaria (c. 1406 – 5 March 1468), daughter of Ernest, Duke of Bavaria and Elisabetta Visconti. Adolf had one child by his first wife:

1. Rupert (died 2 August 1431), married 26 February 1426 Marie of Harcourt, daughter of John VI, Count of Harcourt and widow of Reginald, Duke of Jülich and Guelders, whose title had passed to Rupert's father.

Preceded by William I	Count of Ravensberg; 1395–1403	Succeeded by William II
Preceded by William I	Duke of Berg; 1408–1437	Succeeded by Gerhard VII
Preceded by Reinald IV	Duke of Jülich; 1423–1437	Succeeded by Gerhard VII
