= Walram, Count of Jülich =

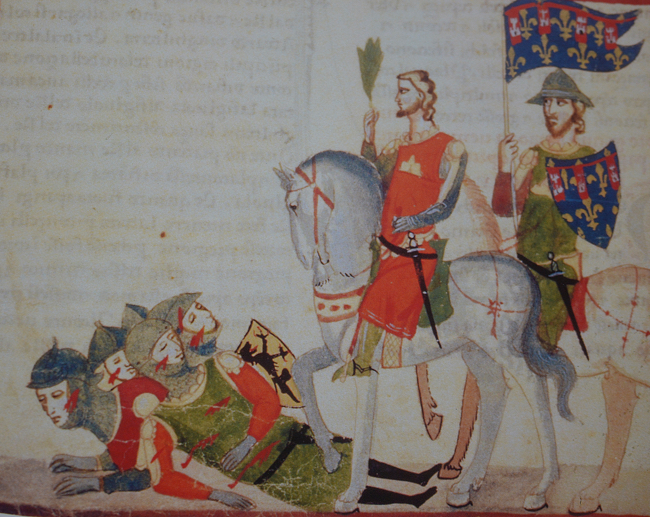
Walram, Count of Jülich

Walram, Count of Jülich (1240/45 – c. August 1297, after Battle of Furnes) was the second son of William IV, Count of Jülich and Richardis of Guelders, daughter of Gerard III, Count of Guelders.

== Biography ==
In 1278, Walram succeeded his father as Count of Jülich when his father and his elder brother, William, were slain together in Aachen. He served as Provost at Aachen as late as 1279/1280. Walram was a fierce opponent of the Archbishop of Cologne and a partisan of the Duke of Brabant in the War of succession for Limburg. In the Battle of Woeringen in 1288 he captured Archbishop Siegfried, which enabled him to gain supremacy over the Archbishop. He won Zülpich among others and secured his other fiefs.

Walram was wounded at the Battle of Furnes on 20 August 1297, and died several days later.

== Family and children ==
In 1296, Walram married Marie of Brabant-Aarschot (c. 1278 – 25 February 1332), daughter of Godfrey of Brabant and Jeanne, dame de Vierzon. Marie was the heiress of both Aarschot and Vierzon. Walram died the year after their marriage and his brother Gerhard succeeded him as Count of Jülich. Marie married again in 1323 to Robert of Beaumont and at her death Vierzon went to her sister Elisabeth who had married Walram's brother Gerhard. Walram and Marie had:

- William (1297/98 – 31 October 1311), Canon of St. Marian at Aachen

== Sources ==
- Arblaster, Paul (2012). A History of the Low Countries. Palgrave Macmillan.
- Möller, Walther (1995). Stammtafeln westdeutscher Adelsgeschlechter im Mittelalter (in German). Vol. 1. Verlag Degener & Co.
- Roest, Bert (2013). Order and Disorder: The Poor Clares between Foundation and Reform. Brill.
- Verbruggen, J. F. (2002). The Battle of the Golden Spurs (Courtrai, 11 July 1302): A Contribution to the History of Flanders' War of Liberation, 1297-1305. The Boydell Press.

Preceded by William IV	Count of Jülich; 1278–1297	Succeeded by Gerhard V
