= Walram of Jülich =

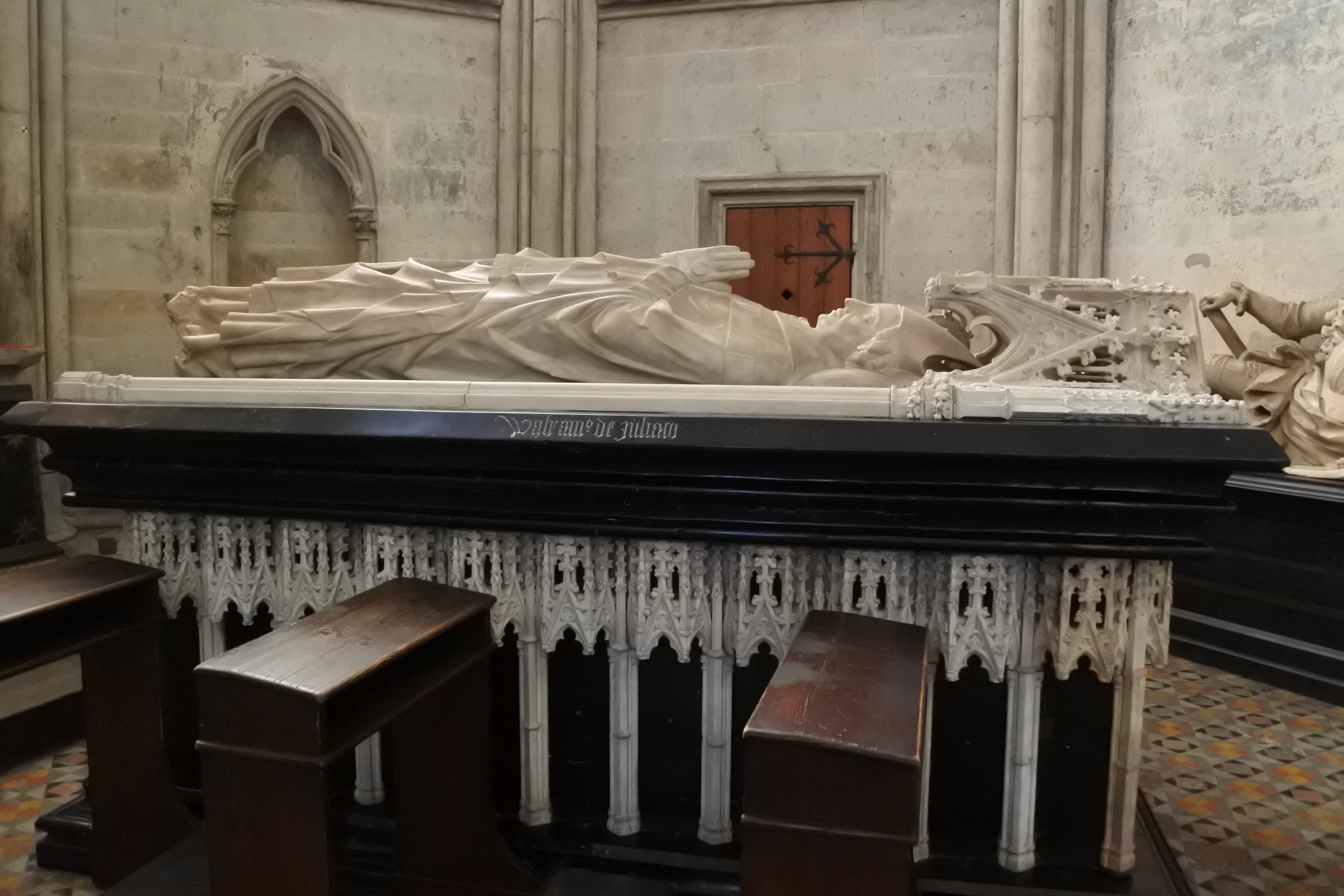
Tomb of Archbishop Walram of Jülich at the Chapel of St. Michael, Cologne Cathedral

Walram of Jülich (c. 1304 – 14 August 1349) was Archbishop of Cologne from 1332 to his death in 1349.

== Life ==
Walram was one of the younger sons of Count Gerhard V of Jülich and his wife Elisabeth of Brabant-Aarschot. From 1316 to 1330 he studied in Orléans and Paris. From 1327 he was a canon in Cologne, as well as a provost in Maastricht.

In 1332 the Archbishopric of Cologne fell vacant. The cathedral chapter had requested the appointment of the Francophile Bishop of Liège, Adolf II of the Mark. However, Walram's brother, Count William V of Jülich, spent enormous sums of money on procuring Walram's election as archbishop (sums which Walram by the time of his death had still not been able to repay completely), in which he was successful. Walram thus became Archbishop of Cologne on 27 January 1331/32, with the support of Pope John XXII.

At this time Walram was still living in France. His appointment clearly rested on his high birth and the wealth and political will of his brother rather than on his own ability. At the beginning of his time in office the tensions which had been building up over the previous decade between the Archbishopric of Cologne and the County of Jülich were dispersed and a formal accord set in place between the two states, in which the dominant partner was Count William V of Jülich. Peace was thus established on the lower Rhine early in the new archbishop's reign. This enabled him to concentrate his forces on the ongoing feud between the Archbishopric and the County of the Mark in Westphalia and in 1345 to neutralise the County temporarily as a political power. The rulers of southern Westphalia had far-reaching connections however, particularly through their family relationships, and were soon able to escalate the conflict into a full-scale local war, to which in 1347 and 1349 it was eventually possible to negotiate a peace treaty.

This military activity put such a strain on Cologne's finances that the cathedral chapter exercised its right of co-rulership and bound the archbishop to seek its consent for all future decisions. This curtailment of his powers, together possibly with a realisation of his personal weaknesses, persuaded him to withdraw from day-to-day government in 1347, leaving charge of the finances and later also of other administrative duties to the knight Reinhard von Schönau.

Walram was not however entirely lacking in achievements. In the first years of his reign he agreed a pact of friendship between the Archbishopric and the City of Cologne. In 1334, before the start of his troubles, he founded Cologne Charterhouse, thus at last establishing a Carthusian presence in the birthplace of the order's founder, Bruno of Cologne. He was able in the 1340s to obtain in return for his vote in the election of Emperor Charles IV significant concessions and money, which he used to extend the territory of the Archbishopric. In 1344 he entirely rebuilt with improved defences the town of Menden after it was destroyed by Count Adolph II of the Marck, having granted it municipal rights earlier in his reign. (As a result of its unfortunate position on the border of the County of the Mark Menden was unusually subject to damage in the repeated conflicts between Cologne and the Counts of the Mark, and had been destroyed several times in the previous century by both sides).

In 1349 he began a journey to France with a small retinue, ostensibly for the purpose of saving the chapter the great expenses of maintaining a court. In the course of the journey he died on 14 August 1349 in Paris. His body was returned to Cologne and is buried in the quire of the cathedral.

== Memorials ==
Apart from his grave in Cologne Cathedral, his name is honoured by a street and a school - the Walram-Gymnasium and the Walramstraße - in Menden.

== Sources ==
- Janssen, Wilhelm, 1970: Walram von Jülich (1304-1349) in: Rheinische Lebensbilder, vol. 4, Düsseldorf/Cologne 1970 (2nd ed Cologne 1980), pp. 37–56

Walram of Jülich Counts of Jülich Born: c. 1304 Died: 14 August 1349 in Paris
Catholic Church titles
Regnal titles
Preceded by Heinrich II von Virneburg	Archbishop-Elector of Cologne and Duke of Westphalia and Angria; 1332–1349	Succeeded by Wilhelm von Gennep
