= William II of Berg =

Count of Berg and Ravensberg

William II
- Duke of Berg
- Born: c. 1348; Jülich, County of Jülich
- Died: 25 June 1408; Düsseldorf, Duchy of Berg
- Buried: Abbey church in Altenberg
- Noble family: House of Jülich
- Spouse: Anna of the Palatinate
- Father: Gerhard VI of Jülich, Count of Berg and Ravensberg
- Mother: Margaret of Ravensberg

William II (c. 1348 – 25 June 1408) was born in Jülich, as the son of Gerhard VI of Jülich, Count of Berg and Ravensberg, and Margaret, daughter and heiress of Otto IV, Count of Ravensberg, and Margaret of Berg.

Upon his father's death in 1360, William became Count of Berg and Ravensberg, a title that his father had gained by marrying the heiress of Berg and Ravensberg. In 1380, King Wenzel elevated him to the rank of Duke, thus becoming the first Duke of Berg.

William fought the counties of Mark and Cleves to prevent them from combining but in 1397 he was taken prisoner in the battle of Kleverhamm. He lost Remagen, Kaiserwerth and Sinzig to his nephew Adolf IV, Count of Kleve-Mark and due to these losses, his sons turned against him and imprisoned him in 1403/04. He ultimately forced them to submit and later supported his brother-in-law Rupert, King of Germany against Guelders-Jülich and won the County of Blankenburg. William died on 25 June 1408 and is buried in the Abteikirche in Altenberg.

== Family and children ==
On 28 September 1363, William married Anna of the Palatinate (1346 – 30 November 1415), daughter of Rupert II, Elector Palatine and Beatrice of Sicily. They had the following children:

1. Beatrice (c. 1364 – 16 May 1395), married in 1385 Rupert I, Elector Palatine, his second wife, no issue
2. Margarete (c. 1364 – 18 July 1442), married in 1379 Otto I (the Evil), Duke of Brunswick-Göttingen (died 13 December 1394)
3. Rupert (died 29 July 1394), Bishop of Passau and Paderborn
4. Adolf (died 14 July 1437), married Yolande de Bar and Elisabeth of Bavaria, ruled Ravensburg (1395–1403) and Berg (1408–1437)
5. Gerhard (died 22 October 1435), Archdeacon of Cologne
6. William (c. 1382–1428), married Adelheid of Tecklenburg, ruled Ravensberg (1403–1428)

William II of Berg House of Jülich Born: c. 1348 Died: 25 June 1408
Preceded by Gerhard	Count of Berg; Since 1380 Duke of Berg; 1360–1408	Succeeded by Adolf
Preceded by Gerhard	Count of Ravensberg; 1360–1395	Succeeded by Adolf
