= Reinald IV of Guelders =

Reinald IV
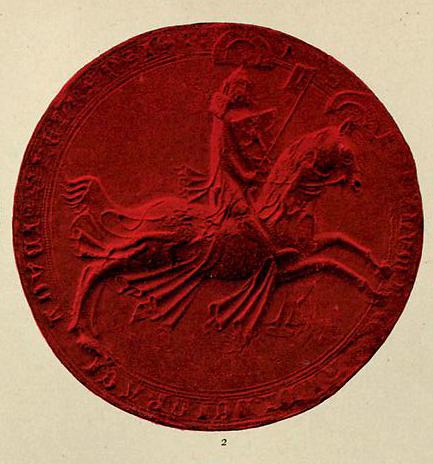
- Born: c. 1365
- Died: 25 June 1423
- Noble family: House of Jülich
- Spouse: Marie of Harcourt
- Father: William II, Duke of Jülich
- Mother: Maria of Guelders

Reginald IV (c. 1365 – 25 June 1423) was the second duke to rule both Guelders and Jülich.

Reginald was the son of William II, Duke of Jülich and Maria of Guelders. He became duke upon his brother William's death in 1402 without issue.

In conjunction with the Wittelsbach counts of Holland, Hainaut and Zeeland, Reginald tried in vain to slow the emergence of Burgundy in the Netherlands area and in 1406 was unable to enforce old claims against Burgundy to Brabant-Limburg. He allied himself with King Rupert of Germany, supporting his coronation in Aachen and remained closely connected with the House of Orléans. In 1407, Reginald supported his brother-in-law, John of Arkel, against the Dutch and in 1409 received the city of Gorinchem from John. This started a new with Holland which ended in 1412 when Reginald ceded Gorinchem for a large sum of money. He also conceded the city of Emmerich as a result of an earlier promise to the duke of Cleves. Reginald led the traditional feuds of his house, particularly those against the bishops of Utrecht and against Holland and Friesland. He occupied Arkel, but in 1422 he was forced to seek peace and return all of his conquests. Reginald also stood against the House of Cleves in the Niederrhein area and maintained a lot of influence over Guelders.

On 5 May 1405, Reginald married Marie of Harcourt, daughter of John VI, Count of Harcourt.

Reginald died childless near Arnhem on 25 June 1423 and was buried at Kloster Monkhuizen. The Duchy of Jülich descended to his first cousin once removed Adolf. The Duchy of Guelders descended to Reginald's grandnephew, Arnold of Egmond, although the House of Jülich fought unsuccessfully against the House of Egmond for this title.

Reginald (IV) House of Jülich Born: c. 1365 Died: 25 June 1423
Preceded by William I/III	Duke of Guelders; 1402–1423	Succeeded by Arnold
Preceded by William I/III	Duke of Jülich; 1402–1423	Succeeded by Adolf
