= William III, Count of Jülich =

German noble (1150–1218)

William (German: Wilhelm) was Count of Jülich from 1207 to 1219. He was a nephew of the previous Count, William II. He married Mathilde, daughter of Waleran III, Duke of Limburg. He died in 1219 during the Fifth Crusade in Egypt, and was succeeded by his son William IV.

He is known for having taken part in the Albigensian Crusade as part of a German contingent headed west, along with the at the time Provost of Cologne, Engelbert II of Berg, his oldest brother Adolf III, Count of Berg and Leopold VI, Duke of Austria.

He later participated in the Fifth Crusade, where he died during the Siege of Damietta by 1219.

== Bibliography ==
- VC: Sibly, W. A. and M. D. (1998). The history of the Albigensian Crusade: Peter of les Vaux-de-Cernay's Historia Albigensis. Woodbridge: Boydell. ISBN 0-85115-807-2.
