= William I, Duke of Jülich =

German noble (c. 1299–1361)

- Born: c. 1299
- Died: 26 February 1361
- Noble family: House of Jülich
- Spouse: Joanna of Hainaut
- Issue: Gerhard VI of Jülich, Count of Berg and Ravensberg; William II, Duke of Jülich
- Father: Gerhard V of Jülich
- Mother: Elisabeth of Brabant-Aarschot

William I (c. 1299 – 25/26 February 1361) was the first duke of Jülich from 1356, having previously been count (from 1328) and margrave (from 1336). Some authors call him William V, because he was the fifth count. Other authors call him William VI, since they count the son and co-ruler of Count William IV as William V.

== Life ==
William I was the eldest son of Gerhard V of Jülich and Elisabeth of Brabant-Aarschot, daughter of Godfrey of Brabant.

William I was a key political figure of his time, being a brother-in-law to both Edward III of England and Emperor Ludwig IV. He spent enormous sums of money to have his brother Walram of Jülich appointed as Archbishop of Cologne over Adolph II of the Marck. In 1337, he was crucially involved in the German-English alliance which caused the start of the Hundred Years' War. William was an important supporter of Emperor Ludwig and for a time, he supported the Habsburgs against the House of Luxembourg in the Carinthian war of succession. Upon the collapse of the German-English alliance and the death of his brother-in-law, William switched his allegiance to Emperor Charles IV. In 1352, he initiated an inheritance tax on Heinsberg-Valkenburg/Monschau. William won important positions through his Archbishop brother and also served for a time as a field captain for Flanders in the Hundred Years' War. His sons fought against him during an uprising of part of the Jülich knighthood which opposed inclusion in the increasing territorial state, and he was imprisoned by them in 1349, but released in 1351 due to public pressure.

Upon his father's death in 1328, William became Count of Jülich. In 1336, William was appointed Margrave by his brother-in-law, Emperor Ludwig IV, and in 1356–57, he was raised to the level of Duke by Emperor Charles IV, thus becoming the first Duke of Jülich. His skillful marriage policy, especially the marriage of his son Gerhard to Margaret of Ravensberg, heiress of Berg and Ravensberg, enabled him to add territory to the house of Jülich. Upon William's death in 1361, the Duchy of Jülich passed to his second son, William, his eldest son having predeceased. William and his wife are buried in Nideggen.

He seems to have held the title of Earl of Cambridge from 1340 to his death.

== Family ==
On 26 February 1324, in Cologne, William married Joanna of Hainaut (1311 or 13 – 1374). They had the following children:

1. Gerhard, Count of Berg and Ravensberg (c. 1325 – 1360), had issue
2. William, Duke of Jülich (c. 1327 – 1393)
3. Richardis, married Engelbert III of the Marck
4. Mary, married Godfrey II of Heinsberg
5. Reinold
6. Joanna, married William I, Count of Isenburg-Wied
7. Elizabeth (c. 1330-6 June 1411), married John Plantagenet, 3rd Earl of Kent and Sir Eustache d'Aubrechicourt

== Sources ==
- Prestwich, Michael (2005). The New Oxford History of England: Plantagenet England 1225-1360. Oxford University Press.
- Stein, Robert (2017). Magnanimous Dukes and Rising States: The Unification of the Burgundian Netherlands, 1380-1480. Oxford University Press.
- Warner, Kathryn (2017). Long Live the King: The Mysterious Fate of Edward II. The History Press.

William I, Duke of Jülich House of Jülich Born: c. 1299 Died: 25/26 February 1361
Preceded by Gerhard V	Count of Jülich; 1328–1356	Succeeded by Elevated to Duke
Preceded by Elevated from Count	Duke of Jülich; 1356–1361	Succeeded by William II
Peerage of England
New creation	Earl of Cambridge; 1340–1361	Extinct
