= Gerhard V of Jülich =

German noble

Gerhard V of Jülich (before 1250 – 29 July 1328), Count of Jülich (1297–1328), was the youngest son of William IV, Count of Jülich and Richardis of Guelders, daughter of Gerard III, Count of Guelders.

Gerhard succeeded his brother Walram as Count of Jülich in 1297. He supported King Adolf in the Battle of Göllheim in 1298, but when Adolf was killed by King Albert I, Gerhard submitted to Albert and was allowed to keep his imperial fief. He helped Albert against the Rhenish electors in 1300, which confirmed his interests with respect to Cologne. Gerhard also won the river duties of Kaiserswerth, Mönchen-Gladbach, Kessel-Grevenbroich, Rheydt, Münstereifel/Bergheim and Müllenark, among others. In 1313, Gerhard supported Ludwig IV in the succession war for the throne of Germany and allowed Ludwig's coronation in Aachen against the will of the Archbishop of Cologne.

== Family and children ==
Gerhard married before 13 December 1299 Elisabeth of Brabant-Aarschot (c. 1280 – 1350/55), daughter of Godfrey of Brabant and Jeanne, dame de Vierzon. Elisabeth's sister Marie had married Gerhard's brother Walram. Gerhard and Elisabeth had:

1. William (c. 1300 – 1361)
2. Ludwig (died after 1311)
3. Gottfried (died 1335), married Elisabeth of Cleves
4. Walram (1303/04 – 14 August 1349), Archbishop of Cologne (1332–1349)
5. Henry, Provost of St. Andreas, Cologne (1319–1334)
6. John (died after 1327), Canon at Liège St. Jean
7. Maria (died c. 1353), married Henry II of Virneberg, Dietrich VIII, Count of Cleves and Conrad II of Saffenberg
8. Elisabeth, married John II, Count of Sayn and Gottfried of Hatzfeld
9. Richardis (7 March 1314 – 7 March 1360), married 1330 Otto IV, Duke of Lower Bavaria

== Sources ==
- Roest, Bert (2013). Order and Disorder: The Poor Clares Between Foundation and Reform. Brill. ISBN 9789004243637.

| Preceded by Walram | Count of Jülich; 1297–1328 | Succeeded by William V |
