= Maria, Duchess of Guelders =

Marie of Guelders
- Died: 12 May 1405
- Noble family: House of Wassenberg
- Spouse: William II, Duke of Jülich
- Issue: William I of Guelders and Jülich; Reinald IV, Duke of Guelders and Jülich; Joanna
- Father: Reginald II, Duke of Guelders
- Mother: Sophie Berthout

Marie of Guelders (died 12 May 1405) was one of two pretenders to the title of Duchess of Guelders and Countess of Zutphen on behalf of her son during the War of the Guelderian Succession from 1371 to 1379.

The war began after the deaths of her brothers, Reginald III of Guelders and Edward of Guelders. Edward died from wounds received at the Battle of Baesweiler, and Reginald, who was known as the fat, died months later. Succession was also claimed by Marie's sister, Mathilda, whose side was called the Heeckerens and were led by Frederik van Heeckeren van der Eze (1320-1386). Her party was called the Bronckhorsters and was led by Gijsbert V van Bronckhorst (1328-1356). Upon victory of her party, the title of Duke of Guelders went to her son, William.

Marie was daughter of Reginald II, Duke of Guelders and Sophie Berthout, lady of Malines. On 25 December 1362 she married William II, Duke of Jülich († 1393). They had three children:

- William (1364 † 1402), duke of Guelders (as William I) and of Jülich (as William VII)
- Reinald († 1423), duke of Guelders (as Reinald IV) and of Jülich
- Joanna, who married John V, Lord of Arkel († 1428)
