= William IV, Count of Jülich =

Count of Julich

William IV, Count of Jülich (c. 1210 – 16 March 1278) was the son and heir of William III of Jülich and Mathilde of Limburg, daughter of Waleran III, Duke of Limburg.

William's father joined the Crusades in 1217 and died in the Siege of Damietta in 1218. William succeeded his father as Count of Jülich under the guardianship of his uncle, Eberhard of Hengenbach. In the 1220s and early 1230s William greatly expanded his territory. In 1234 he fought in the battle of Altenesch in the Stedinger Crusade and was made imperial administrator of Konzen and Aachen, guardian of Kornelimünster and over the possessions of Essen Abbey on the left bank of the Rhine river. He also won the imperial fiefdoms of Sinzig, Hengenbach-Heimbach, Merzenich, Thürnich, Düren and Bardenberg, thus doubling the possessions of the Counts of Jülich.

By 1240 William's territorial expansion created conflict on the eastern side of his territory with the Archbishop of Cologne. William was a loyal supporter of the House of Hohenstaufen which made him a rugged opponent of Cologne Archbishop Konrad von Hochstaden, under whose rule more disputes with William broke out. As a result of the Hochstander inheritance, William gained parts of Münstereifel, which moved him even closer to his opponent. In 1242 in the battle of Lövenich, William captured Konrad and forced him to renew all of William's Cologne fiefs. In 1262 William and Engelbert I, Count of the Mark, came to the assistance of the Teutonic Knights during the Siege of Königsberg. In the battle of Zülpich in 1267, William captured Engelbert II of Falkenburg, Archbishop of Cologne, and held him captive in the castle of Nideggen until 1270/71, again forcing the Archbishop to recognize all of William's Cologne fiefs. As a result of this action, William was excommunicated by Pope Clement IV from 1268 to 1270.

William supported Richard of Cornwall as King of the Romans and Richard confirmed all of William's imperial fiefs. William also supported the Kingdom of France against King Alfonso X of Castile in 1267/77. He stood against Guelders, Cleves and Heinsberg because of their similar interests.

On the night of 16 March 1278, which has become known as Gertrudisnacht (Night of St. Gertrude), William, along with his sons William and Roland (and according to some sources, a third son), entered the town of Aachen to collect taxes for King Rudolph I of Germany. There was a riot and William and his sons were killed. The city of Aachen was later ordered to pay a high compensation to William's widow Richardis on account of his murder.

== Family and children ==
By contract on 12 March 1237, William was betrothed to Margaret of Guelders, daughter of Gerard III, Count of Guelders and Margaret of Brabant. Most sources accept Margaret as the mother of William's elder children but there is no evidence that this marriage was ever consummated. Further, William is known to have married Margaret's sister, Richardis of Guelders (c. 1215 – 1293/98), prior to January 1250 but there is no evidence of a papal dispensation which would have been required for William to marry the sister of his first wife. Thus, it's possible that Richardis was the mother of all of William's children. William had eleven children, as well as a natural son Roland (and possibly a second natural son) who died with him in the riot at Aachen.

1. Matilda (c. 1238 – bef. 1279), married 1258 John I, Count of Looz
2. Margaret (c. 1240 – 12 October 1292/93), married 1261 Dieter III, Count of Katzenelnbogen
3. William (c. 1240 – 16 March 1278), died with his father in the riot at Aachen. In 1267 he married Marie of Flanders, daughter of Guy, Count of Flanders and Matilda of Bethune. They had two sons:
  1. William the elder, who died in 1297 at the Battle of Furnes, during the Franco-Flemish War.
  2. William the younger, who would become one of the leaders of the Flemish rebellion after the French conquest of the county of Flanders, and who died during the Battle of Mons-en-Pévèle in that same Franco-Flemish war.
4. Richardis (c. 1243 – after 1291), married before 1265 William, Count of Salm
5. Walram (1240/45 – 1297)
6. Otto (c. 1245 – after 1283), Archdeacon at Liege from 1282
7. Gerhard (before 1250 – 1328)
8. Catharine (c. 1250 – after 1287), married before 1273 John of Arberg
9. Petronilla (c. 1255 – after 1300), married before 1276 Ludwig, Count of Arnsberg
10. Blancheflor (c. 1255 – after 1330), married before 1277 Henry, Count of Sponheim
11. Mechtild (c. 1255 – aft. 1287)

== Sources ==
- De Maesschalck, Edward (2019). De Graven van Vlaanderen (861-1384) [The Counts of Flanders (861-1384)] (in Dutch) (2nd ed.). DavidsFonds / Standaard uitgeverij. ISBN 9789002268458.
- Heirbaut, Dirk (2002). "Jan van Renesse en de andere Vlaamse aanvoerders in de Guldensporenslag" [John of Renesse and the other Flemish commanders of the battle of the Golden Spurs]. In Trio, Paul; Heirbaut, Dirk; van den Auweele, Dirk (eds.). Omtrent 1302 [About 1302] (in Dutch). Leuven: Universitaire Pers Leuven. ISBN 9058672085.
- Huffman, Joseph P. (2024). Medieval Cologne: From Rhineland Metropolis to European City (A.D. 1125–1475). De Gruyter. ISBN 9783111571355.

Preceded by William III	Count of Jülich; 1219–1278	Succeeded by Walram
