= Düsseldorf Cow War =

1651 conflict over church properties in Germany

| Date | June 1651 – December 1651 |
| Location | Berg |

Belligerents
| Palatinate-Neuburg | Margraviate of Brandenburg |

Commanders and leaders
| Wolfgang Wilhelm, Duke of Palatinate-Neuburg; Charles IV, Duke of Lorraine | Frederick William, Elector of Brandenburg |

Strength
| | 7,500 |

Casualties and losses
- 2 Civilians †; Herd of cows (POW)

The Düsseldorf Cow War (German: Düsseldorfer Kuhkrieg) was a military conflict over the status of church property in the duchies Jülich and Berg. It lasted between June and December 1651, pitting the Catholic Palatinate-Neuburg against the Protestant Margraviate of Brandenburg. It ended in peaceful settlement, confirming the distribution of church property on the basis of the year 1651.

== Background ==
The rapid spread of the Lutheran and Calvinist doctrines following the Reformation was followed by a period of Catholic resurgence known as the Counter-Reformation. Interdenominational conflicts such as the Cologne War and Strasbourg Bishops' War prompted the creation of the Catholic League and the Protestant Union, with the intention of safeguarding the interests of the Holy Roman Empire's Catholic and Protestant nobility respectively. These alliances entered their first conflict in 1609, when a succession crisis in the United Duchies of Jülich-Cleves-Berg sparked the War of the Jülich Succession. The territories in question covered an area of 14,000 km^{2} (5,400 sq mi), having both geopolitical importance due to their proximity to the Spanish Road and a booming economy, fueled by refugees from the lands ravaged by the Eighty Years' War.

The mentally ill duke Johann Wilhelm died on 25 March 1609, leaving no children, and the Emperor Rudolf II had claims to the duchies stemming from intermarriage but was unable to openly declare his intentions without compromising his perceived neutrality. Six other claimants appeared, with the rulers of the Margraviate of Brandenburg and Palatinate-Neuburg having the only credible claims through their marriages to Johann Wilhelm's aunts. On 2 April, a regency was established, including the duke's widow Antoinette of Lorraine, the privy councilors and an imperial commissioner. On 24 May, Rudolf II announced that the Aulic Council was to provide a definite verdict within four weeks.

Brandenburg and Neuburg viewed this as a direct attempt at annexing the duchy. On 10 June 1609, they signed the Treaty of Dortmund, rejecting all other claimants and establishing a provisional government together with the local estates. Their troops entered the duchy in defiance of the regency and the Emperor. In January 1610, Henry IV of France signed a draft military pact with the Protestant Union, dispatching 22,000 men under Claude de La Châtre, Baron de la Maisonfort to north–east France. A comparable number of troops were dispatched by the Dutch towards Schenkenschanz, in an apparent show of force towards Spain. Archduke Leopold V sought to raise his profile in the power struggle between the Emperor and Archduke Matthias by convincing the former to annul the Treaty of Dortmund and appoint him as the imperial commissioner. Leopold triumphantly entered Jülich but soon found himself besieged by an army three times his size, as fighting spread to Aachen and Düren.

The struggle between the Catholic royal family and the Protestant princes brought fears of a larger religious war. The Protestant Union mobilized 5,000 men, while Leopold recruited 1,000 cavalry and 3,000 infantry in the Prince-Bishopric of Strasbourg. His Habsburg relatives and the rest of the Catholic League refused to openly support Leopold, only gathering troops for their own protection. On 13 March 1610, the Protestant count Otto von Solms–Braunfels invaded Strasbourg with 2,000 troops. The Catholics simply retreated into walled towns such as Saverne, waiting until the ill-disciplined invaders ran out of money and retreated. A meeting was set in Prague on 1 May 1610, to broker a settlement. Rudolf's initial decision to enfeoff the entire duchy to Christian II, Elector of Saxony was rejected by a number of moderate princes, leading to the postponement of negotiations until August.

A second Protestant invasion, this time consisting of 9,800 troops and artillery, succeeded in seizing Dachstein, Mutzig and Molsheim but was also brought to a halt after the local population refused to supply the troops with food. In the meantime Leopold fled Jülich, leaving 1,500 troops inside. Their fate was sealed as the Kingdom of France and the Dutch Republic finally intervened in support of the Protestants, aiming to antagonize Spain by putting further pressure on the Spanish Road. The Dutch intercepted a relief party heading from the Prince-Bishopric of Liège, while also bolstering the besiegers into a combined total of 25,200 troops. On 1 September, the garrison surrendered in return for free passage into upper Alsace. On 24 October, the Protestant Union and the Catholic League agreed to withdraw their forces and disband them until the end of the year. The war severely depleted the coffers of all the involved parties, leading to increased taxes which in turn triggered the 1612 Tyrol Peasant Revolt. Occupiers Wolfgang Wilhelm, Count Palatine of Neuburg and Joachim Ernst, Margrave of Brandenburg-Ansbach took over the duchy by military might, without being able to secure official recognition.

In 1611, Protestantism spread to the villages of Stolberg and Weiden in the vicinity of Aachen. The city council of Aachen imposed a fine on those inhabitants who attended these services. Five citizens were detained for ignoring the town's decree and banished as they refused to pay the fine. This caused a riot against the council on 5 July. The Catholic councillors were expelled and many Catholic buildings were sacked. The rebels assaulted the church and the college of the Jesuits, smashed the altars and images and held a mock mass dressed in priestly garments. A new Protestant council was established and appealed for support to the occupying forces. In 1612, Rudolf ordered the Count Palatine and the Margrave to reinstate Catholicism in the city of Aachen under the menace of a ban. The Protestants ignored the command and seriously wounded an Imperial commissioner sent to implement the Emperor's edict.

Upon Rudolf's death, Emperor Matthias confirmed Saxony's rights to the fief, rekindling the dispute and the conversions of the Count Palatine and the Margrave to Calvinism and Catholicism respectively completely restructured their past alliances. Brandenburg and Neuburg officials ceased communicating with each other by the beginning of 1614. In May 1614, 300 Dutch troops ejected the Neuburg garrison from Jülich, in an attempt by the Dutch statesman Johan van Oldenbarnevelt to prevent a Brandenburg plot against the former. Wolfgang Wilhelm interpreted it as a declaration of war, raising 900 troops and taking Düsseldorf. The new Brandenburg incumbent, George William, was indeed plotting a coup, but his financial dependence on the Dutch prevented him from fulfilling his plans. Another misunderstanding took place when Spain and Albert VII, Archduke of Austria interpreted the Dutch military buildup as a violation of the Twelve Years' Truce, mobilizing 13,300 infantry and 1,300 cavalry under Spanish general Ambrogio Spinola.

On 20 February 1614, Emperor Matthias ordered the restoration of Catholic rule in Aachen. Fearing an attack, the town council requested the aid of the Elector of Brandenburg, who sent several hundred soldiers under General Georg von Pulitz to reinforce the local militia. On 24 August, Spinola besieged Aachen on the premise of imposing a two-year-old imperial edict issued by Rudolf. After several days of negotiations, the garrison was allowed to leave together with Protestant clerics and non-citizens. The old city council was reinstated while participants in the 1611 riots were punished. From Aachen Spinola pressed on towards Düren, Neuss, Wesel and Mülheim, which he captured with Wolfgang Wilhelm's help. The Dutch occupied the duchy of Mark and the rest of Cleves, while also reinforcing Jülich.

On 13 October, Spinola and Maurice of Nassau initiated peace negotiations under French and English mediation known as the Treaty of Xanten. The territories of Jülich-Berg and Ravenstein went to Wolfgang Wilhelm of Neuburg, while Cleves-Mark and Ravensberg went to George William. Spain gained a total of 62 towns including three Rhine crossings, namely Wesel, Orsoy and Rheinberg, significantly enhancing its position in north-west Europe. The Dutch retained their garrisons at Jülich and Pfaffenmütze but were outflanked or isolated, putting them in an unfavourable position when the Twelve Years' Truce expired in April 1621.

The defeat of the Protestant Union forces during the Palatinate campaign of the Thirty Years' War coincided with the end of the Twelve Years' Truce. Spain seized the opportunity to strengthen its hold on the Rhineland region by dispatching a 10,000 man army under Hendrik van den Bergh towards Jülich besieging it in September 1621. The Dutch responded by launching raids on Wolfgang Wilhelm's possessions in an attempt to prevent him from supplying straw and oats to the Spanish. Wolfgang Wilhelm raised a force numbering 2,500 troops, which assisted the Spanish in taking Jülich and Pfaffenmütze in July 1622 and January 1623 respectively. Fearing that Brandenburg would be Bergh's next target, George William secretly transferred 1,300 men into Dutch service.

In May 1624, George William conceded Ravenstein to Wolfgang Wilhelm, in return for the recognition of their mutual possessions. The Spanish pushed the Dutch and Brandenburgers from Jülich, most of Mark and Ravensberg, isolating the Netherlands from potential German Protestant allies. However by 1646, the tide of the Thirty Years' War had turned in favour of the Protestants. George William's son Frederick William was persuaded by his confidant Johann von Norprath (a Neuberg defector) to move his court from Berlin to Cleves, while also increasing the local garrisons to 4,100 men. In November 1646, Frederick William invaded Berg, but the invaders soon ran out of food and returned home, achieving only the return of Ravensberg.

== Conflict ==
The Peace of Westphalia finally settled the Thirty Years' War in 1648. Three years later, the Holy Roman Empire found itself on the brink of war when Wolfgang Wilhelm claimed that the normative year imposed by the treaty took precedence over the Treaty of Xanten in regard to church properties. Since more parishes were in Catholic hands in 1624 than a decade before, Wolfgang Wilhelm hoped to stabilize his control over Jülich and Berg. The Aulic Council was still reviewing the evidence when Frederick William declared himself a protector of the Protestant population living in the two duchies.

In June 1651, 3,800 Brandenburg troops invaded Berg, killing two civilians, bombarding Wolfgang Wilhelm's palace and seizing a herd of cows belonging to his wife. After rallying at Kaßlerfeld, the Brandenburgers created an encampment at Angermund and unsuccessfully beleaguered Düsseldorf. The Neuburg envoy in Vienna described the incident as a "Cow War", comparing Brandenburg's ruler to a cattle rustler. By July, Brandenburg had reinforced its expedition by 2,700 troops, mobilizing 16,000 more across its various territories. Wolfgang Wilhelm employed the help of Charles IV, Duke of Lorraine, who launched a counter invasion of Mark with the intention of obtaining provisions for his army. The estates of all five duchies refused to provide money to either side, while Duisburg's city council requested Dutch protection. The Dutch condemned the actions of their former ally, while Sweden persuaded both sides to disengage through their envoy Melchior von Hatzfeldt. By the end of the year, Neuburg and Brandenburg had disbanded their troops. The Aulic Council distributed the church property on the basis of the current year, ending the conflict. Further negotiations in 1666 and 1672 confirmed the 1651 arrangements, putting an end to the dispute.

== See also ==
- Chicken War
- War of the Cow
- War of the Stray Dog
- Saukrieg
