= War of the Jülich Succession =

1609-1614 war of succession in Northwest Germany

- Part of European wars of religion, the French–Habsburg rivalry, and the Eighty Years' War
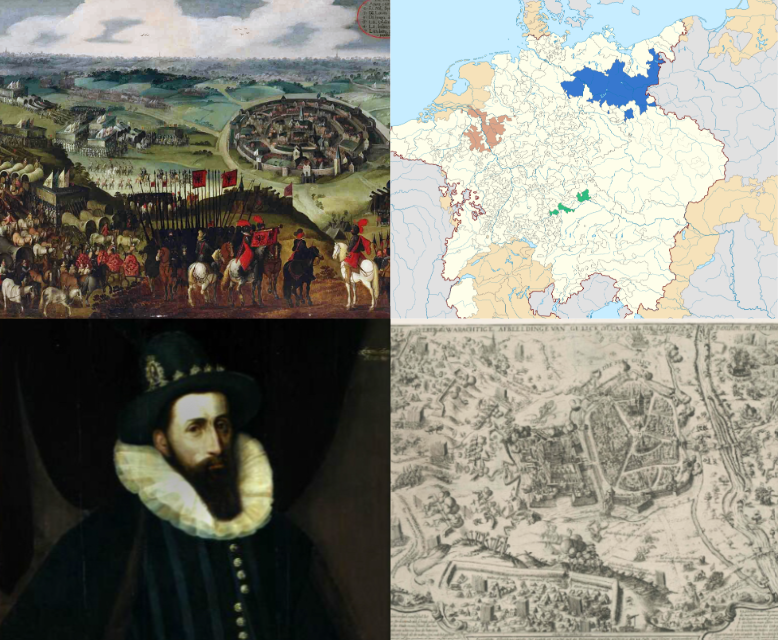
- Top left: Siege of Aachen (1614); Top right: Map of the main players in the War of the Jülich Succession; Bottom left: John William, Duke of Jülich-Cleves-Berg; Bottom right: Siege of Julich (1610)
Date	10 June 1609 – 24 October 1610; May 1614 – 13 October 1614
Location	United Duchies of Jülich-Cleves-Berg
Result	Treaty of Xanten; Mark and Cleves to Brandenburg; Jülich and Berg to Wolfgang Wilhelm

Belligerents
1609–1610: Holy Roman Empire; Prince-Bishopric of Strasbourg; Prince-Bishopric of Liège; Prince-Bishopric of Passau; City of Jülich	1609–1610: Margraviate of Brandenburg; Palatinate-Neuburg; Dutch Republic; Kingdom of France; Protestant Union; Kingdom of England
1614: (Spain) Spanish Empire; Palatinate-Neuburg	1614: Margraviate of Brandenburg; Free Imperial City of Aachen; Dutch Republic

Commanders and leaders
1609–1610: (Holy Roman Empire) Archduke Leopold V 1614: (Spain) Ambrogio Spinola; Wolfgang Wilhelm of Palatinate-Neuburg	1609–1610: Wolfgang Wilhelm of Palatinate-Neuburg; Joachim Ernst, Margrave of Brandenburg-Ansbach (Kingdom of France) Claude de La Châtre, Baron de la Maisonfort (Dutch Republic) Maurice of Nassau; Otto von Solms–Braunfels 1614: George William, Elector of Brandenburg (Dutch Republic) Maurice of Nassau

The War of the Jülich Succession, also known as the Jülich War or the Jülich-Cleves Succession Crises (German: Jülich-Klevischer Erbfolgestreit), was a war of succession in the United Duchies of Jülich-Cleves-Berg. The first phase of the war lasted between 10 June 1609 and 24 October 1610, with the second phase starting in May 1614 and finally ending on 13 October 1614. At first, the war pitted Catholic Archduke Leopold V against the combined forces of the Protestant claimants, Johann Sigismund, Elector of Brandenburg and Wolfgang Wilhelm of Palatinate-Neuburg, ending in the former's military defeat. The representatives of Brandenburg and Neuburg later entered conflict amongst themselves, partly due to religious conversions, which led to the resumption of hostilities.

The war was further complicated by the involvement of Spain, the Dutch Republic, France, England, and the Protestant Union, making it closely tied to the Eighty Years' War, as well as part of the European wars of religion. It also corresponded to a Protestant uprising in the Free Imperial City of Aachen. It was finally settled by the Treaty of Xanten, whose provisions favored Spain, though the conflict was not fully resolved until later.

== Background ==
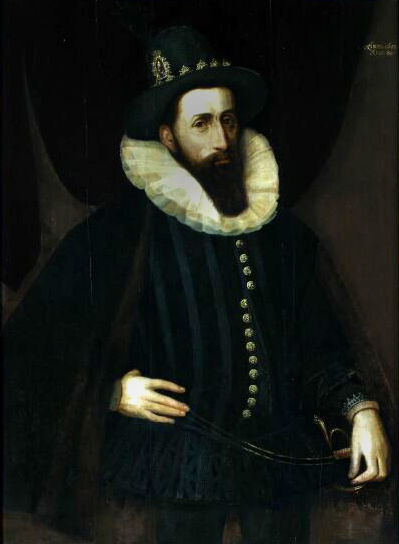
John William, Duke of Jülich-Cleves-Berg, portrayed in 1605, was already marked by his serious mental illness.

By the early 17th century, the rapid spread of the Lutheran and Calvinist doctrines after the Protestant Reformation was met by a period of Roman Catholic resurgence, known as the Counter-Reformation. Interdenominational conflicts such as the Cologne War and the Strasbourg Bishops' War prompted the creation of the Catholic League and the Protestant Union, with the intention of safeguarding the interests of the Holy Roman Empire's Catholic and Protestant nobility, respectively. Growing tensions led to war in 1609, when a succession crisis in the United Duchies of Jülich-Cleves-Berg sparked the War of the Jülich Succession. The territories in question covered an area of 14,000 km² and had both geopolitical importance from their proximity to the Spanish Road and a booming economy, which was fueled by refugees fleeing the lands that were being ravaged by the Eighty Years' War. The immediate cause of war was the death of John William, Duke of Jülich-Cleves-Berg on 25 March 1609, who was affected by serious mental illness, and left no heirs to succeed him.

Part of the succession dispute came from laws that had been established by William the Rich, Duke of Jülich-Cleves-Berg and father of John William. William had established two major laws, the Privilegium Unionis and Priviligium Successionis, the privileges of Union and Succession respectively. The Privilegium Unionis had declared that the Duchies of Jülich, Cleves, and Berg, which had recently been united in 1521, would continue to be inherited as one, rather than be divided. The Priviligium Successionis declared that in the case of the extinction of the male line (which is what happened when John William died), the duchies would pass to a female line. However, the nature of this female succession was not clear, in that it was not obvious whether or not the duchies should pass through the eldest female, the eldest living female, or the eldest male descendent of a female.

Emperor Rudolf II had claims to the duchies stemming from intermarriage. However, he was unable to declare his intentions openly without compromising his perceived neutrality. A total of six other claimants appeared, with rulers of the Margraviate of Brandenburg and Palatinate-Neuburg having the only credible claims through their relationship to John William's sisters. However, the nature of the claims were different. Johann Sigismund of Brandenburg claimed the duchies through his wife, a granddaughter of William the Rich, and the most senior female descendent of William the Rich. However, Wolfgang Wilhelm of Neuburg, son of Phillip Ludwig, Count Palatine of Neuburg, held a claim through his mother, a direct daughter of William, hence he was the most senior male descendent. Rudolf II's indecision in selecting a person to succeed John William would create a power vacuum that allowed parties to sought to exploit, creating numerous factions in the duchies.

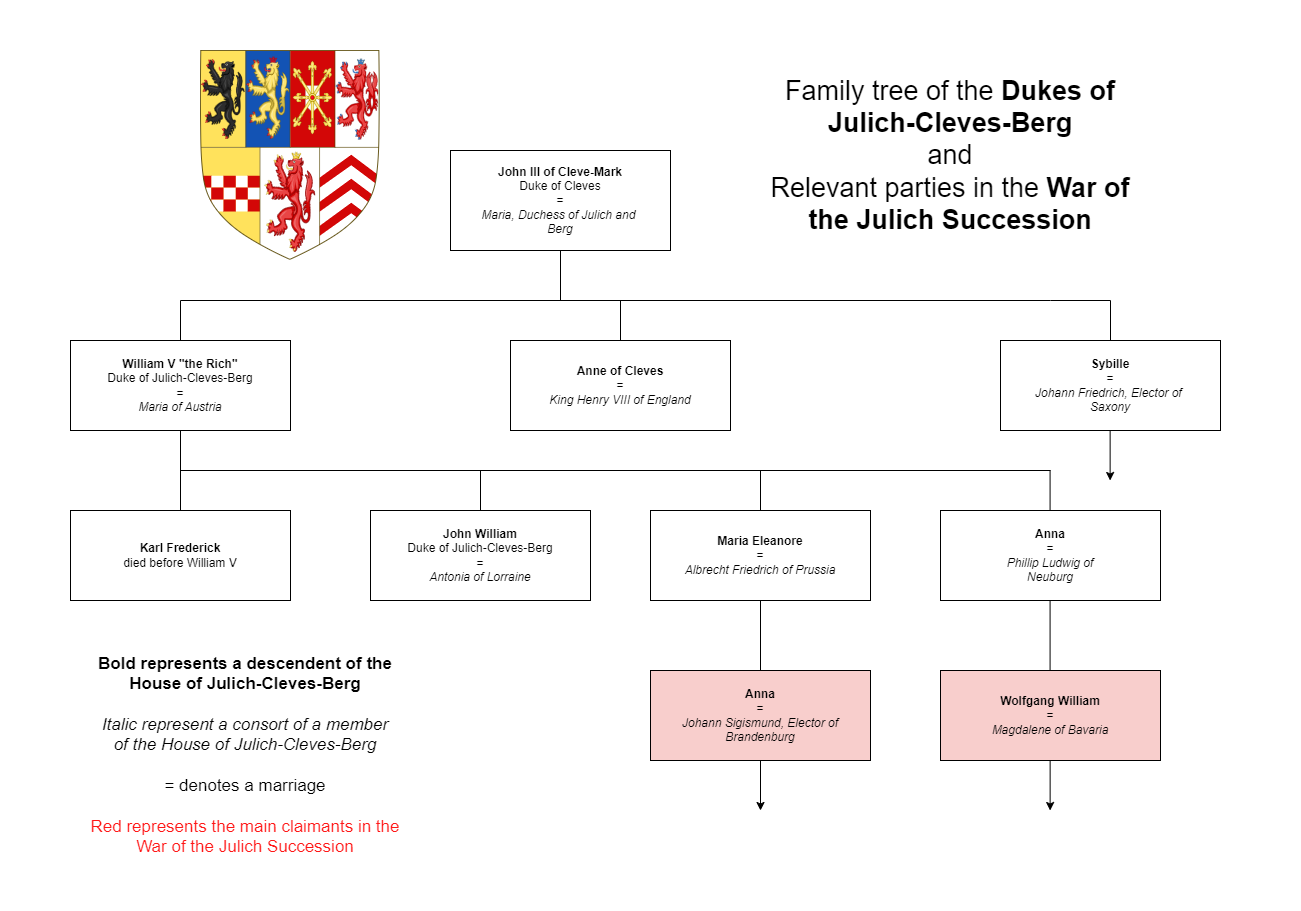
Family tree of the dukes of Jülich-Cleves-Berg. The main claimants are highlighted in red.

== Road to war ==
Neuburg was a relatively young principality, established during the War of the Landshut Succession. It was small and weak, surrounded by stronger powers like Bavaria and the Electoral Palatinate. Thus, acquiring the Jülich succession was a major goal of Neuburg. Not only would it provide more land for Neuburg, but the territories in question were rich and could help the economy of Neuburg as well. As Neuburg had benefited from aligning with the Emperor in the past, despite their Lutheran religious status, Wolfgang Wilhelm had personally travelled to Prague to gain Imperial support. Neuburg also attempted to contact France and England. However, all of this failed.

The Electorate of Brandenburg, also officially Lutheran, was also interested in the Jülich territories, but unlike Neuburg would not be able to count on Imperial support. Brandenburg had challenged the Emperor recently during the Strasbourg War, so tensions between the two parties were still high. Thus, Brandenburg sought allies, particularly amongst major protestant powers both foreign and in the Empire. Though they had failed to acquire support from Denmark-Norway, negotiations with the Dutch Republic had been successful. Emboldened by these alliances, Brandenburg was unwilling to accept a compromise deal from Neuburg, instead claiming the entirety of the duchies for themselves.

Map showing the Electorate of Brandenburg (blue), Palatinate-Neuburg (green), and the United Duchies of Jülich-Cleves-Berg (orange).

Despite the matter being a contest over a relatively small amount of land, the succession quickly grew to be an international issue. The Dutch Republic, fiercely anti-Habsburg, did a not want a pro-Habsburg figure to inherit the duchies. Hence, the Dutch had been eager to form an alliance with the likeminded Electorate of Brandenburg, who was also anti-Habsburg. France also had interests in the region. Henry IV of France, like the Dutch, was opposed to a pro-Habsburg ruler in Jülich-Cleves-Berg (see French–Habsburg rivalry). Despite being a Catholic, Henry IV wanted to ensure that a Protestant would inherit the duchies, but he didn't necessarily care who. As such, he contacted Landgrave Maurice of Hesse-Kassel, explaining that a united Protestant cause was required to keep the Habsburgs away. A large number of Protestant princes would also support this sentiment. Frederick IV, Elector Palatine and head of the Protestant Union, wished for a peaceful settlement. Johann of Nassau-Siegen shared the same thoughts and told Maurice as such. Henry IV of France also tried to garner support from other Protestant princes, namely Wurttemberg.

Maurice agreed, but despite his efforts, it was impossible to have Brandenburg and Neuburg agree on a settlement, as both parties believed their claim was best. When the ailing John William finally died on 25 March 1609, both Neuburg and Brandenburg rushed to claim the duchies. However, the privy council that had governed Jülich-Cleves-Berg through John William's madness refused to accept either of them, and continued to rule on their own by establishing a regency council, which included the late duke's wife, Antonia of Lorraine, and an imperial commissioner sent by Emperor Rudolf II. On 24 May, Rudolf II, who had the authority to dictate a final settlement over the succession, announced that the Aulic Council (one of the two Supreme Courts in the Holy Roman Empire) was to provide a definite verdict within four weeks.

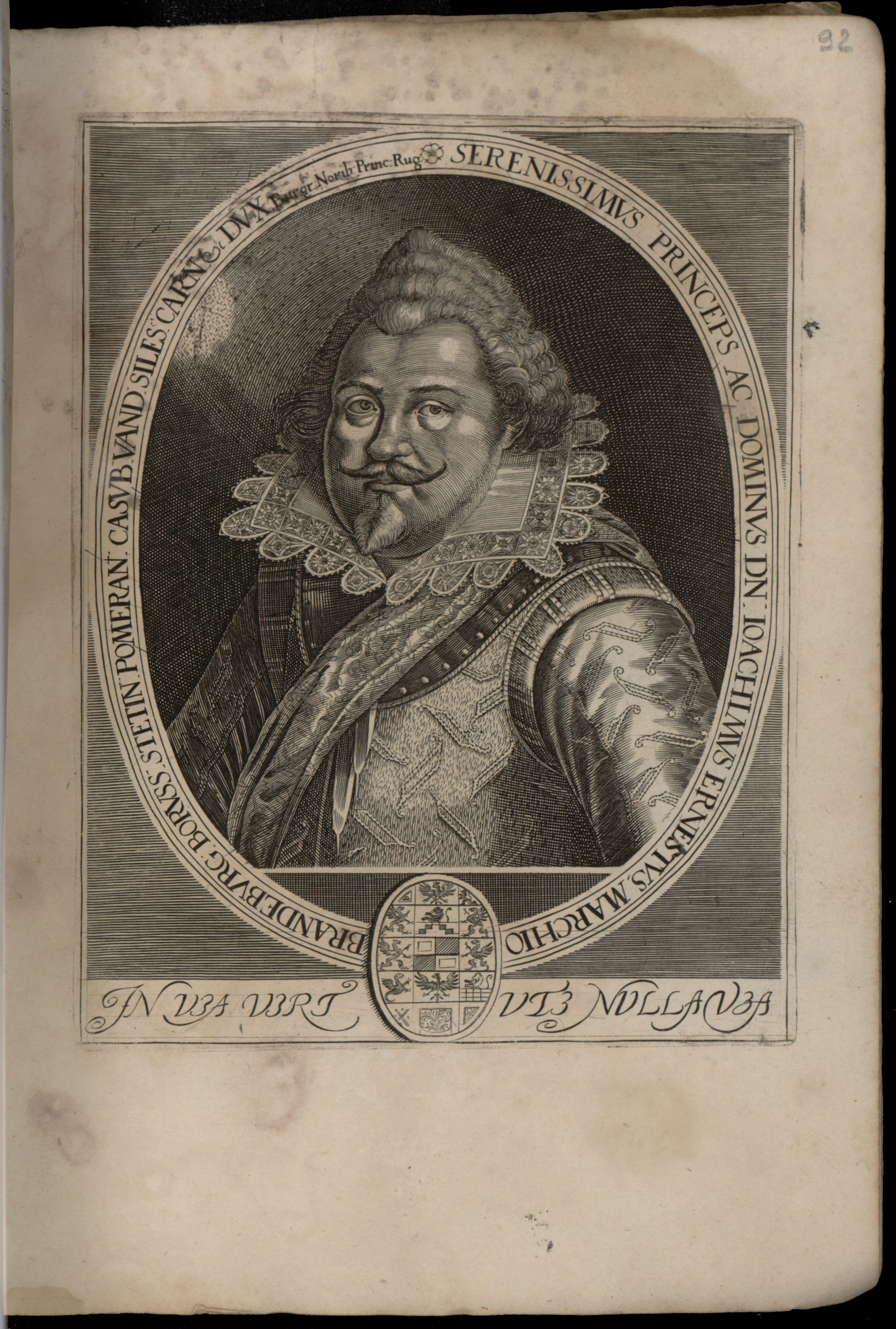
Joachim Ernst, Margrave of Brandenburg-Ansbach, and a member of House Hohenzollern. He would be a leading figure in Brandenburg's attempts to acquire the duchies of Jülich-Cleves-Berg, and served as Johann Sigismund's representative in the duchies.

Brandenburg and Neuburg, who viewed the regency as a direct attempt at undermining their claims, finally agreed to a provisional settlement, with mediation from Maurice of Hesse-Kassel. When Joachim Ernst, a representative of Johann Sigismund, passed by Kassel on his way to Jülich, Maurice convinced him to negotiate with Wolfgang Wilhelm. On 10 June 1609, they met in Dortmund and signed the Treaty of Dortmund (1609), rejecting all other claimants, and establishing a provisional government together with the local estates.

Wolfgang Wilhelm and Joachim Ernst entered the duchy in defiance to the acting regency and the Emperor, along with their troops. Though initially hesitant and urged by Imperial agents to wait for a decision from Emperor Rudolf, by 22 July, most of the estates had sworn fealty to their new rulers. King Henry of France was very pleased with the treaty, as the protestants had joined forces to prevent a pro-Habsburg seizure of the duchies, just like he had hoped.

Emperor Rudolf hurriedly intervened while the Protestant claimants of Neuburg and Brandenburg, also known as the possessors, (German: possidierenden) (Note: The terms "possessors" and "protestant claimants" both represent the two main claimants to the duchies, Wolfgang Wilhelm of Neuburg and Johann Sigismund of Brandenburg. They are also sometimes referred to as the "possessionary princes") had still not fully secured the duchies. He demanded the annulment of the Dortmund treaty and sent another Imperial Commissioner, Archduke Leopold V, Bishop of Passau and Strasbourg, to take charge. Johann von Rauschenberg, the administrator of the city of Jülich, had not yet sworn fealty to Neuburg or Brandenburg, (Note: Instead of swearing fealty to the possessionary princes, Johann von Rauschenberg had fled Julich. He returned when the possessionary princes left, maintaining his loyalty to the Emperor.) and held the fortress city in the name of the Emperor. On 23 July, von Rauschenberg transferred Jülich to Archduke Leopold. The Habsburg’s seemingly militant intervention was not appreciated by France, the Dutch Republic, or the Protestant claimants, and war was inevitable.

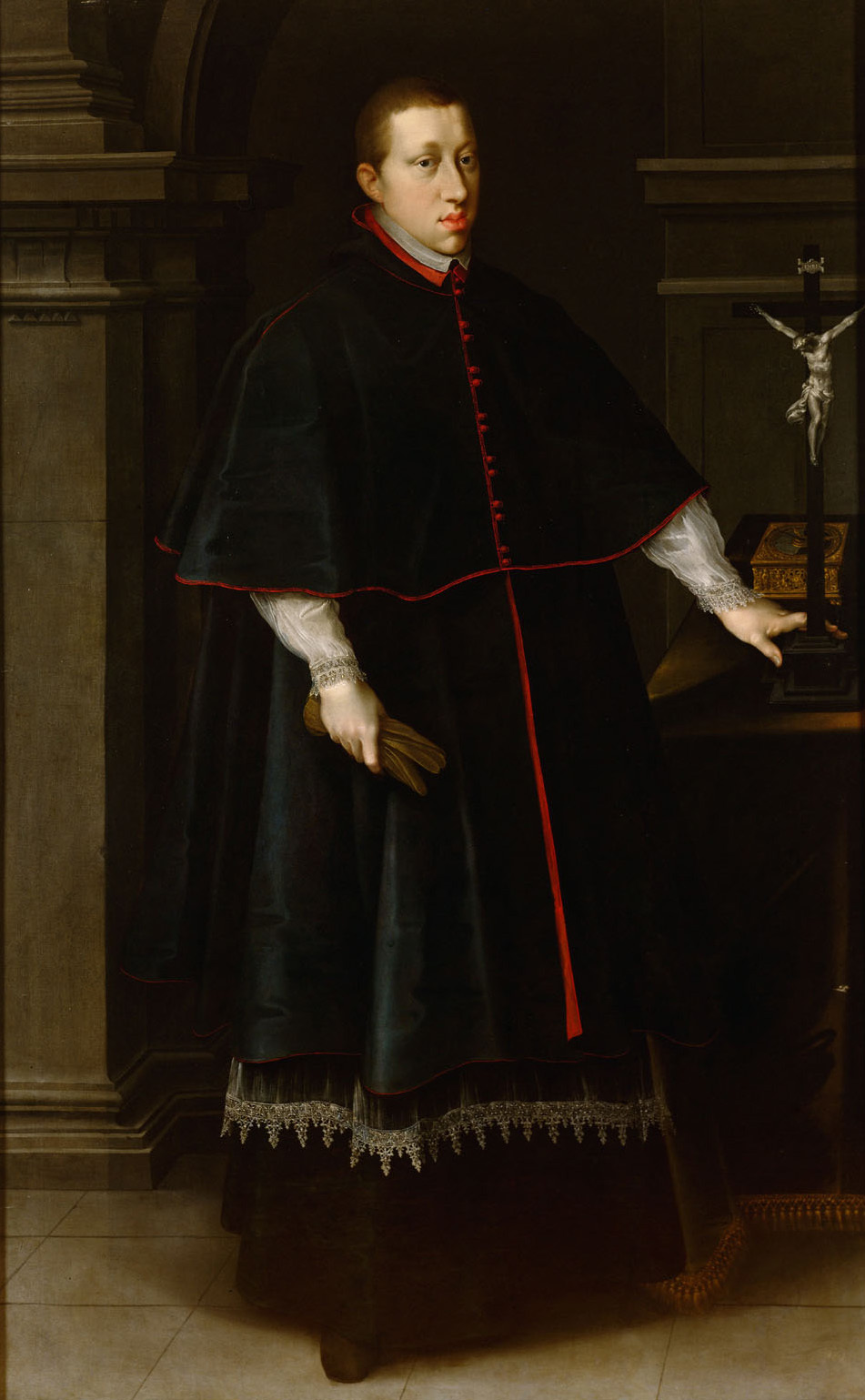
Archduke Leopold V of Further Austria, Bishop of Passau and Strasbourg

== First phase (1609-1610) ==
=== Habsburg reaction ===
By 1609, the Habsburg domains were divided into three major sections. First, there was the Spanish Empire and its Mediterranean possessions, (Note: The Spanish branch of the Habsburgs also held the crown of Portugal through personal union. They also ruled over Spanish colonial possessions, such as those in the Americas.) ruled by King Phillip III. Second were the Holy Roman Emperor's lands in Austria, Bohemia, and Hungary (along with other disparate territories). Last were the Spanish Netherlands, which were ruled by Archduke Albert VII. (Note: Archduke Albert had been made sovereign ruler of the Spanish Netherlands during the reign of King Phillip II of Spain) Archduke Albert, who governed the Spanish Netherlands, was the closest to Jülich-Cleves-Berg. Albert had a decently strong army: the Army of Flanders, under command of the famed general Ambrogio Spinola. Thus, he could have played a role in helping his cousin, Archduke Leopold, who had recently occupied Jülich. However, a series of events prevented Albert from doing so.

The geopolitical situation in the Low Countries in 1609, including the Dutch Republic (orange), the Spanish Netherlands (green), and the Prince-Bishopric of Liege (pink).

Despite being a sovereign ruler over his domains in the Spanish Netherlands, Albert was dependent on Spanish financial and military support. Thus, he was forced to write to Spain, asking for instructions on what to do. His letters had arrived on 14 April 1609, but no response came back from Spain until July. By then, too many things had changed; the Treaty of Dortmund had been signed, and most of the estates had consented to the rule of the possessors. Without any instructions from the Spanish king, Albert was unable to intervene.

Though the aforementioned delay in the correspondence between King Phillip III and Archduke Albert can be somewhat attributed to the distance (the Spanish capital of Madrid is over 1500 kilometers away from Albert's seat in Brussels), the Spanish Council of State, headed by the Duke of Lerma, also seemed uninterested in the whole ordeal. The Spanish Council had received news from the Spanish Netherlands, some of which illustrating the strategic importance of the duchies. According to the Spanish ambassador in Brussels, the duchies of Jülich-Cleves-Berg were necessary in weakening the Dutch cause and strengthening the Spanish cause. He also stated that Phillip had no choice other than let the Protestants seize the duchies or break the 12-year truce to take them. In the end, Spain's orders for Albert was to simply wait until the Emperor made a decision.

Emperor Rudolf II was also unable to directly intervene. Rebellious protestants in his Bohemian territories needed to be dealt with, and he was also involved in the Brothers' Quarrel. Thus, the Emperor had done nothing except declare the Treaty of Dortmund void and send the aforementioned Archduke Leopold to occupy the lands.

=== French reaction ===
Two days after Archduke Leopold seized Jülich, a French diplomat told the Archduke that "my King will also become involved." Word reached Paris on 29 July, and Henry IV called his chief advisors (Villeroy, Sully, Sillery, and Jeannin) for advise on what to do. Villeroy and Sillery both distrusted the German princes and advised Henry to wait until the Protestants formally asked for aid. Villeroy believed that "all that [Henry IV] can gain from this [war] is the glory of having protected a just cause; counterbalanced with that are the perils, expenses and fatigues of a long war. After a long peace... this glory would be dearly bought."

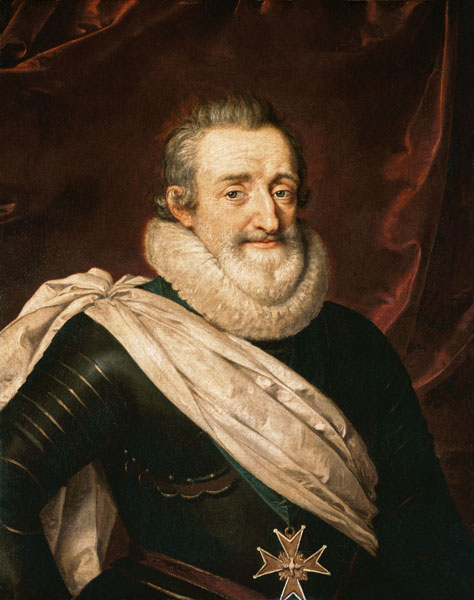
King Henry IV of France was a leading supporter of the Protestant Princes in the first phase of the Jülich War

It was Sully that was the most supportive of war. He believed that not helping the Protestants would harm France's international reputation, and that letting the Habsburgs dominate in Jülich would worsen the Dutch Republic's position (a major French ally at this time). As Minister of Finance, Sully had improved the French economy, so France seemed ready for war. By the evening of 29 July, the King decided that he would fight on the side of the Protestant princes, but he wanted to know exactly what the Protestant plan was before he would specify the details of his aid. In the meantime, Henry called for the raising of levies in northeastern France and worked to move French regiments in the Netherlands to the borders Jülich.

=== Internal division in the Protestant camp ===
Despite France's desire to help the Protestants, neither Neuburg nor Brandenburg cooperated to the extent that Henry wanted. Feelings between Henry IV and the German Protestants had been sour ever since the French king converted to Catholicism in 1593. In addition to this, the French also owed the Germans money which had not been paid back. There were also rumors that the Henry IV wanted the Imperial throne. John Frederick, Duke of Wurttemberg, had previously cautioned the Protestant Union about the risks of allying with outside powers, especially France. John Frederick supported his claim by stating that:

- Henry IV had recently converted to Catholicism
- Previous alliances between France and German Princes had generally ended in France's favor
- Henry was growing old and it was possible that he was seeking future allies to secure his son's (the future Louis XIII) succession. An alliance with France could potentially bring the Protestant Union into a French Civil War
- France would break the balance of power within the Protestant Union and would carry too much weight in the Union's decision making

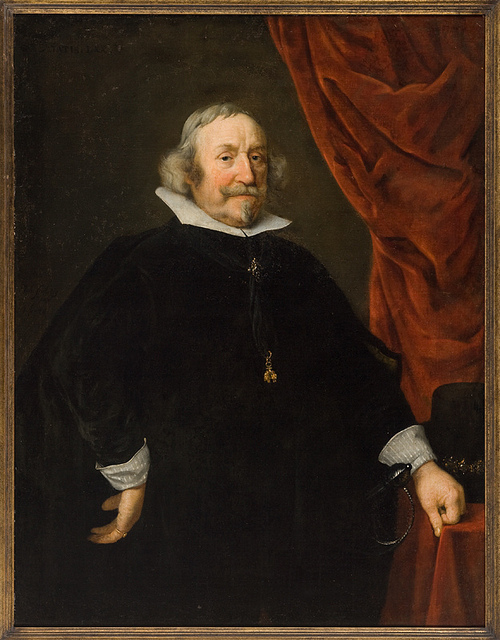
Wolfgang Wilhelm, Count Palatine of Neuburg

Wolfgang Wilhelm and Ernst also failed to cooperate with each other, even after the signing of the Treaty of Dortmund. One issue was that the two had vastly different perspectives on the succession, and they were still technically rivals for the duchies. Both Wolfgang Wilhelm and Ernst had tried to rule the duchies in their own way, according to envoys from Wurttemberg and Baden. With Leopold's occupation of Jülich, the differences between the Brandenburg and Neuburg parties became even more evident. Ernst's initial perspective was to militarily confront Archduke. Wolfgang Wilhelm on the other hand was scared of offending the Emperor, so he wished for a more peaceful resolution. Wolfgang Wilhelm was also concerned with Brandenburg's growing power.

=== Mobilization of the Protestant Union ===
Elector Palatine Frederick IV, John Frederick of Wurttemberg, and George Frederick of Baden met in Friedrichsbuhel in mid-August, and proceeded to discuss the Jülich crisis. They agreed to provide funds to the Protestant claimants. There were several reasons for doing so. First, the duchies of Jülich-Cleves-Berg lay along the Rhine, and allowing it to fall to the Spanish or some other Habsburg sympathizer could be politically and economically crippling for the Protestant princes. In addition, there was the need to maintain the reputation of the Protestant Union. If the Union did not help fellow Protestants, its prestige could be permanently marred.

In September, the possessors petitioned the Protestant Union for aid, and on 17 October, they sent a letter to Elector Frederick IV, leader of the Protestant Union. The possessors requested money, soldiers, arms, and munitions from the Union. The Protestant Union also had to decide on a commander to lead the Protestant army. Both Ernst and Wolfgang Wilhelm would not accept each other's command, so a neutral figure had to be chosen. Two candidates were Johann of Nassau-Siegen and Christian of Anhalt. It was eventually decided that Christian of Anhalt would lead the Protestant cause. (Note: Ernst had originally favored Johann of Nassau, whereas Wolfgang Wilhelm favored Christian of Anhalt. Ernst eventually agreed to Christian, as Christian was very close to the Elector Palatine, meaning that selecting him would make it easier to garner support from the Protestant Union.) He arrived in the duchies on 20 November, and began inspecting the Protestant armies. Using the levies that the possessors had raised, Christian began to form a blockade on Jülich.

=== Archduke Leopold and a doomed mission ===
Some believed that Leopold was a part of a greater Habsburg plan to take over the duchies. Instead, Leopold was left to fend for himself, without financial or military assistance. After arriving in Jülich, Leopold tried to negotiate with neighboring powers. He tried to convince France and the Dutch to stay out of the affair, and he also tried to get aid from Archduke Albert and the Elector of Cologne, Ernst of Bavaria. Leopold specifically asked Elector Ernst (Note: To avoid confusion with Joachim Ernst, who is also referred to in this article as Ernst, The Elector of Cologne is referred to as Elector Ernst.) to personally talk in Jülich. Elector Ernst believed that a personal visit could potentially cause even more tension in the Empire. Unsure on how to proceed, the he decided to contact the Elector of Mainz, Johann Schweikhard von Kronberg. Elector Johann agreed with Ernst.

When the Electors of Cologne, Mainz, and Trier met at the end of August to discuss possibly joining Catholic League, the Elector of Mainz mentioned potentially funding Leopold's cause. Maximilian of Bavaria, head of the Catholic League, refused to help, as he wanted to keep the Catholic League out of the crisis. In the end, Elector Ernst also decided to focus more on mediating a peace rather than providing aid to Leopold. Leopold also contacted the Pope four times, but each time he was rebuffed.

Leopold's appeal to the Spanish Habsburgs also fell on deaf ears. Leopold claimed that the mission would be easy and require only a few resources, as an Imperial Ban, he thought, would scare all opposition into submission. The Spanish Council did not agree. On 12 September, Phillip III ordered Archduke Albert to provide no military aid.

Albert did provide 8,000 Rijkdaalder as a secret subsidy, but it was not enough and Leopold decided to make a secret visit to Albert on 29 October. Leopold requested 24,000 ducats, which he believed would be enough to last until the Spring of 1610. He also requested permission to raise soldiers in the Spanish Netherlands. However, all of this failed. Leopold would request money from Albert several more times but each time Albert stated that his own affairs would not allow him to provide aid. In December, Leopold asked for 10,000 florins from his elder brother, Archduke Ferdinand. His letter was intercepted by the possessors and as a result, the Protestants would know about Leopold's financial troubles. Eventually, it was believed that Leopold's only chance was to wait until an Imperial Ban was declared by the Emperor and Leopold could potentially negotiate.

Rudolf did issue an Imperial Ban in November 1609, but it didn't do anything at all. The possessors just ignored them, because there was nobody to enforce the bans (the Emperor was still busy with his own affairs).

=== France, England, and the Netherlands ===
Having been discouraged by the indecisiveness among the possessors, Henry IV had lost much of his enthusiasm for supporting the Protestant cause. In September, a Dutch ambassador said that Henry was considering withdrawing his soldiers from the border, and in October, Villeroy stated that he had no idea what Henry meant to do. In addition, the Protestant princes had only asked France for money, which seemed like a rebuff of the troops that Henry had mobilized for their cause. However, by the end of October, Henry still supported the Protestant cause and declared his support for the Brandenburg and Neuburg claims. However, he did not outline the details of his support, still waiting for the Protestants to provide a solid plan.

The Dutch Republic was still neutral, despite the war seemingly of major interest to the Dutch since Jülich-Cleves-Berg was very close to the Dutch Republic. The States-General had just agreed to a truce with Spain. After 40 years of constant war, the Dutch needed a break, and thus, there was little interest from the Dutch in joining the Jülich affair.

Nonetheless, Henry wanted Dutch support in the war, and he asked both the Dutch and the English to provide aid. Hence, the Dutch were in a difficult situation. They did not want to support the Protestants and ruin their truce with Spain, but they also did not want to abandon France, who had been a staunch ally in the Eighty Years' War thus far. Though hesitant, eventually the Dutch agreed to join Henry in the case of war.

King James I of England was much more willing to provide aid. At first, James did not seem very interested in the affair. This would change as the year of 1609 progressed. By August, James had offered to help mediate the succession, and he was pleased that the princes had settled the succession peacefully thus far. However, as with Henry, England would not offer military nor economic support until the Protestant princes came up with a course of action.

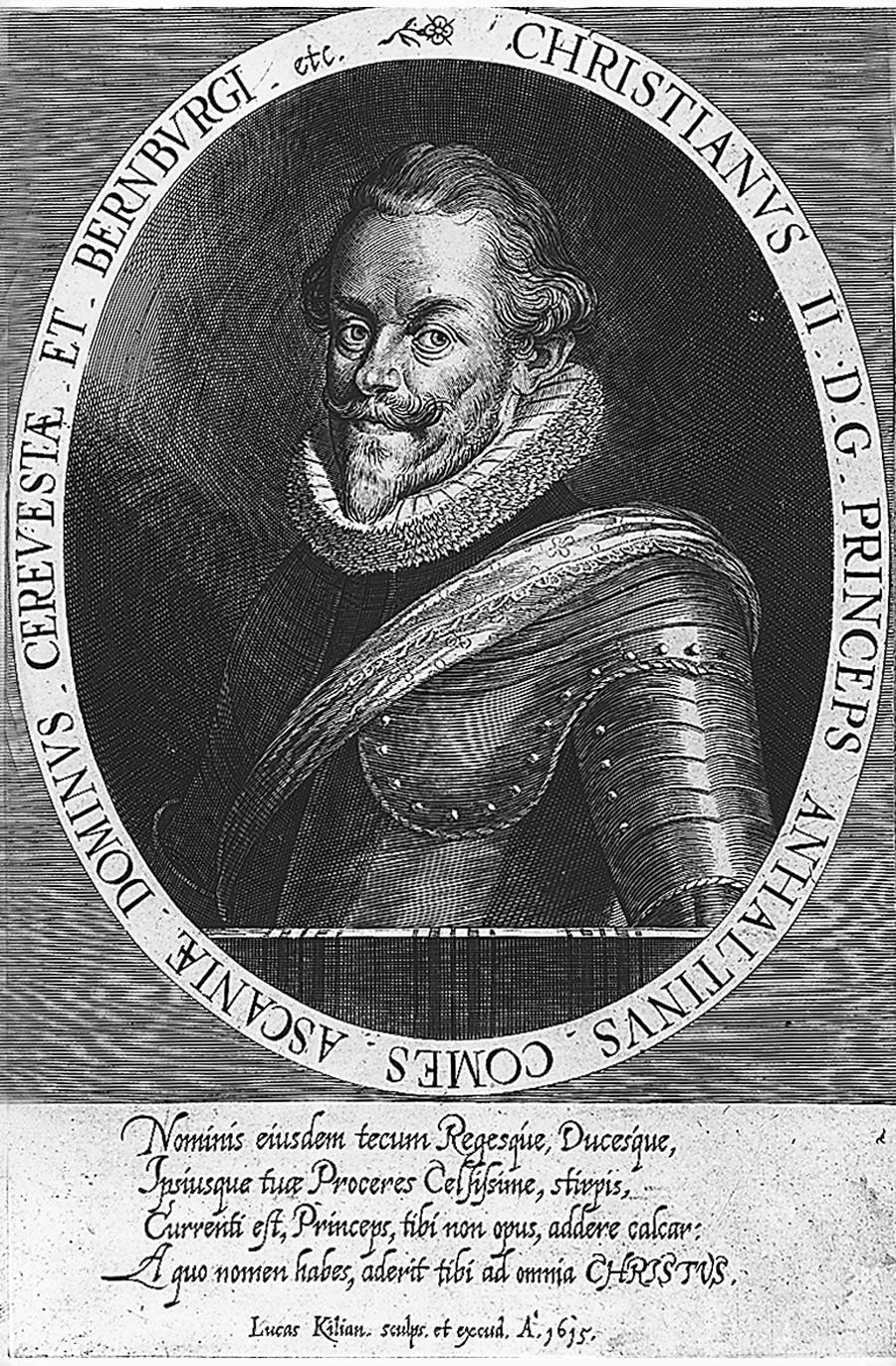
Christian of Anhalt

The entry of Christian of Anhalt changed things. He arrived in Paris on 17 December. Christian told the French king his plans, detailing the size of the Protestant army, which numbered 8,000 infantry and 2,000 horse (half of this number were from Wolfgang's and Ernst's levies, whereas the other half came from the Protestant Union). In just three days, Henry responded, generously offering the same number of soldiers as the Protestants had raised. Henry also agreed to send an ambassador to the next meeting of the Protestant Union at Schwäbisch Hall, scheduled for 10 January. On 25 January 1610, Christian left Paris, pleased with the outcome of the negotiations.

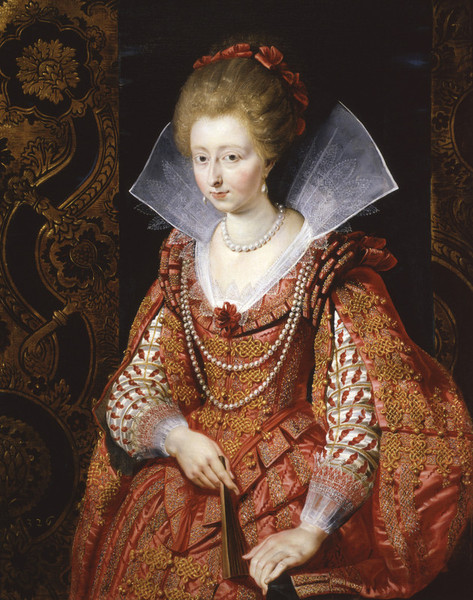
Charlotte Marguerite de Montmorency, Princess of Condé

=== Henry and Charlotte Marguerite de Montmorency ===
Henry's generous response may have been related to recent developments involving Charlotte Marguerite de Montmorency, Princess of Condé. Henry had grown infatuated with the Princess, much to the chagrin of her husband, Henry II, Prince of Condé. On 28 November 1609, the Prince of Condé (and the Princess) fled to Brussels in the Spanish Netherlands. King Henry was furious, and believed that the Prince was conspiring against him, so he threatened to raise an army of 60,000 to capture him. It is possible that Henry agreed to Christian of Anhalt's terms so that he could threaten the Spanish Netherlands into returning the Prince (and the Princess), as it was possible that Spain would intervene in the affair.

=== Meeting at Schwäbisch Hall ===
The Meeting at Schwäbisch Hall began on 10 January 1610. Many major Protestant princes attended, along with representatives from 29 lesser counties and cities, and the French ambassador sent by Henry IV. According to Johann of Nassau-Siegen, it was almost as well attended as the Imperial Diet.

The meeting proved to be both anti-Catholic and anti-Spanish, and that the duchies needed support from France, England, the Dutch Republic, and Denmark.

Though most of the princes in the Union had already agreed to support the possessors, the cities had not, and were not eager to support the Protestant cause. It took another month for the Union to agree upon details. Eventually, it was agreed that the possessors would prepare 5,000 infantry and 1,300 cavalry, and the Union would add 4,000 infantry and 1,000 cavalry. King Henry promised to provide 8,000 infantry, along with 2,000 cavalry and artillery. Henry ratified the agreement on 23 February.

On 31 March, the Dutch Republic agreed to provide in total 12,000 infantry and 1,500 cavalry and artillery. England also agreed to provide military aid.

=== Conflict of 1610 ===
In January 1610, Leopold requested money from Spanish ambassador Baltasar de Zúñiga. Zúñiga agreed to secretly send 6,000 escudos, but declared that he would not send any more money after this. The Spanish Council remained uninterested in German affairs, as Henry IV had recently formed an alliance with Savoy. This convinced the Spanish that an ensuing war would be fought in northern Italy, not Germany. Thus, the Spanish Council authorized the transfer of funds to establishing defenses in Milan. There was also concerns about Henry IV's alleged plans to "recover" the Princess of Condé.

Since February, Archduke Leopold had been recruiting levies in his Prince-Bishopric of Strasbourg and his Prince-Bishopric of Passau. Concerned of Leopold's army, part of the Protestant army was used to defend princes that neighbored Leopold's bishoprics. Another part was dispatched to attack Leopold's forces before they were ready. On 13 March, Protestant Count Otto von Solms–Braunfels invaded Strasbourg with 2,000 troops. The Catholics simply retreated into walled towns such as Saverne and waited until the ill–disciplined invaders ran out of money and retreated. A second attempt would be made later under Ernst and George Frederick of Baden, but like with before, the Catholic armies retreated into walled towns. Nonetheless, the Strasbourg army was prevented from joining Archduke Leopold. Similarly, the Passau army was also neutralized, as they had no money or weapons, the latter of which were seized by the Palatinate. At the end of April, a small Dutch force numbering 1,500 cavalry and 800 infantry was dispatched to the duchies, under the command of Dutch Stadtholder Maurice of Nassau's brother, Frederick Henry.

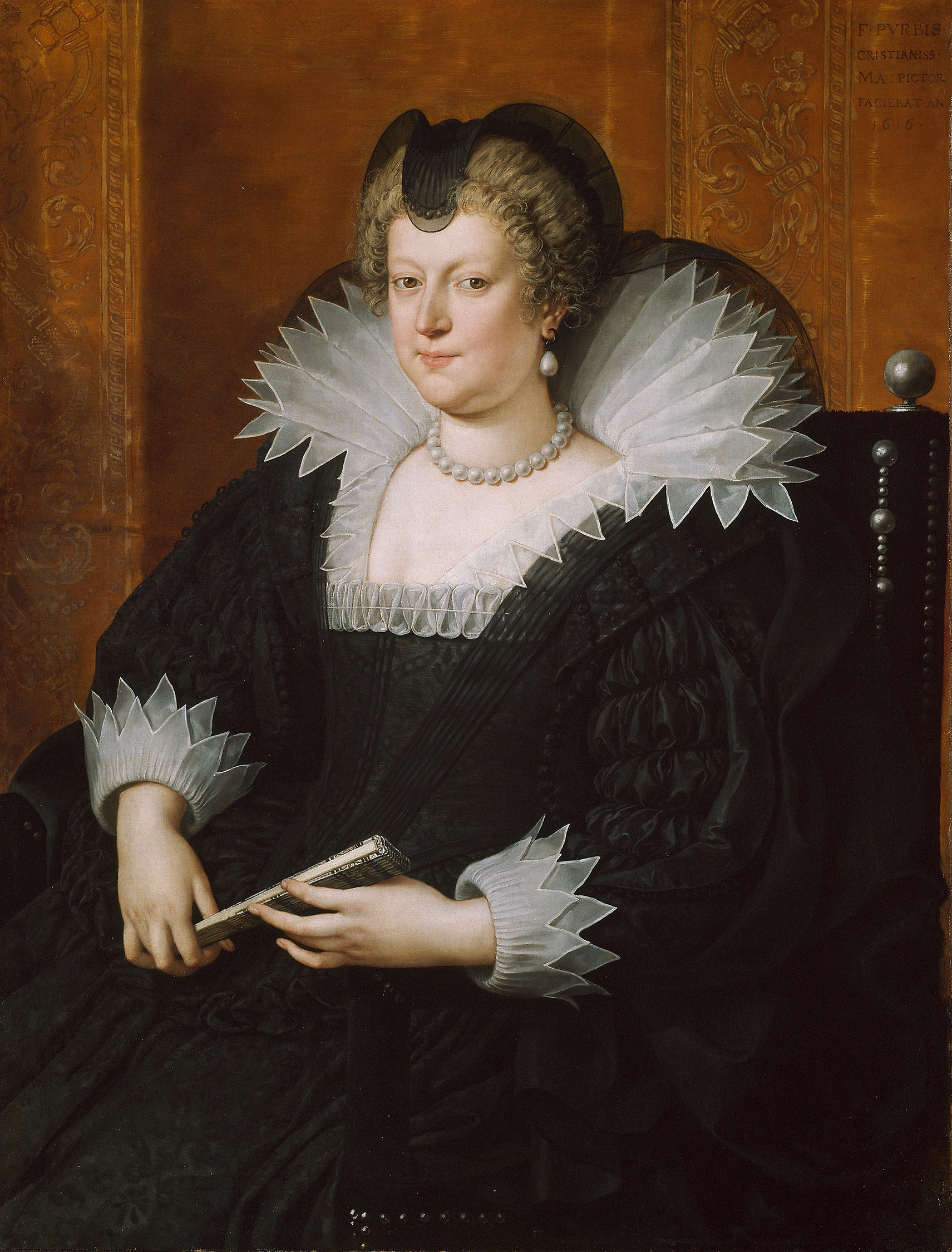
Marie de' Medici, Queen-Regent of France following the death of Henry IV

Despite France having originally promised around 10,000 men, King Henry soon began to levy 20,000 instead, far more than the expected number. Henry also planned to march his army to the duchies by land, which drew alarm. Previously, French armies had often travelled by sea, as the Dutch and English navies held hegemony in the English Channel. Going by land meant that the French army was likely to pass through the Spanish Netherlands.

Hearing about the size of Henry IV's intended army, the Spanish government decided that the French army was too big to be focused on just Jülich. Coupling this with Henry's plans to march his army by land and Henry's infatuation with the Princess of Condé, the Spanish Council was convinced that a French invasion of the Spanish Netherlands was imminent.

On 3 March, Archduke Albert began fortifying the Spanish Netherlands. Regardless of whatever defenses he had set up, Albert was in no position to challenge France. The Army of Flanders had a history of bad mutinies, and so Spinola was unwilling to take risks commanding an army without the proper funding. Thus, Albert was immobilized from pursuing any military action. When Henry requested military access through the Spanish Netherlands, Albert was compelled to allow Henry access through Luxembourg.

Everything changed when Henry IV was assassinated on 14 May, ending whatever grand plans he may have had. Though the coronation of the young Louis XIII happened smoothly, there was much that Marie de' Medici, Henry's wife and now regent of France, needed to do to stabilize the country. Marie de' Medici eventually agreed to continue supporting the Protestants, but not to the extent that Henry had originally planned. The Queen-Regent agreed to provide 8,000 infantry (consisting of 3,000 Swiss mercenaries) and 1,000-1,200 cavalry. This force was to be transported by land to Jülich, (Note: Archduke Albert's allowance of French access through Luxembourg still stood even after Henry IV's death) led by Marshall Claude de la Châtre, and began mobilizing at Metz on 5 July. However, France only promised 4 months of support, before the French army would withdraw. Marie told the Protestants that this army would be best used to secure a peace treaty.

On 1 May 1610, an Imperial meeting was called in Prague, headed by the Emperor himself, seeking to end the hostilities. At first, negotiations seemed promising, with the possessors writing about their willingness to reach an agreement with the Emperor. A plan to install a neutral Catholic prince in Jülich saw favor among the present princes and the French regency. It was decided in June that three new commissioners would be sent, Ernst of Bavaria, Landgrave Louis V of Hesse-Darmstadt, and Duke Henry Julius of Brunswick-Wolfenbüttel.

However, Emperor Rudolf was by no means giving up authority over the duchies. Instead, he decided to enfeoff the duchies to Christian II, Elector of Saxony, who had old claims to the duchies and was loyal to the Emperor. Thus, on 7 July 1610, Saxony was granted the rights to the United Duchies of Jülich-Cleves-Berg. This led to the postponement of negotiations until August. In the meantime, the Protestants succeeded in seizing Dachstein, Mutzig and Molsheim, but these advances were brought to halt after the local population had refused to supply it food. By now, Leopold had fled Jülich and left 1,500 troops inside.

After Henry IV died, the Prince of Condé returned from the Spanish Netherlands. As first prince of the blood, Condé held some political weight. Condé argued that participating in the Jülich war would be an attack on the Catholic faith (as France was supporting Protestants), and anger both Spain and the Pope, neither of which Condé believed France was ready for. (Note: The Prince of Condé was also likely motivated by the hospitality he had enjoyed in Brussels during his time staying away from Henry IV.) Nonetheless, the pro-War party won out, and la Châtre was given orders to march on Jülich, but due to Condé, his expedition was delayed until late July.

The death of Henry IV had also inspired confidence in the Spanish government, which suddenly became interested in the Jülich affair. The new Queen-Regent, Marie de' Medici, was seen as sympathetic to Spain. Moreso, the Spanish Council decided that instead of acting neutral in the case of French intervention, Spain should oppose the possessors to counter the Dutch. Regardless, when Spain discovered that France maintained their agreement to send a small army to aid the possessors, they decided to remain out of the war. The actions of the Habsburgs and Catholics in 1610 can be summarized as follows:

"Spain had opted to avoid war and the costs involved in war; the Emperor had been rendered powerless by the conflicts with his brother [Matthias]; Bavaria [and the Catholic League] and the ecclesiastical princes [Cologne, Trier, Mainz] had not wanted to mix in the affairs of others; and Albert had sought merely to preserve what he already had." - Nicolas de Neufville, Seigneur de Villeroy

Thus, the Protestant military campaign went on unopposed. As mentioned before, the French army's march was delayed until late July. Meanwhile, the Anglo-Dutch army led by Stadtholder Maurice of Nassau had already arrived met with Christian of Anhalt's army on 29 July, just outside Jülich. The Protestant army surrounded the city, beginning the Siege of Jülich. On 10 August, the bombardment began. The French army arrived on 19 August.

With the Protestant army numbering over 30,000 troops, Jülich's defenders had little hope of winning. On 1 September, the garrison surrendered in return for free passage into Upper Alsace. French armies withdrew from Jülich a week after, and most parties would disband much of their armies. The war, though brief, severely depleted the coffers of all the involved parties, leading to increased taxes, which in turn triggered the Rappenkrieg. French intervention had used up one third of the war chest that Henry IV had built up during his reign, and the Protestant Union went far over budget.

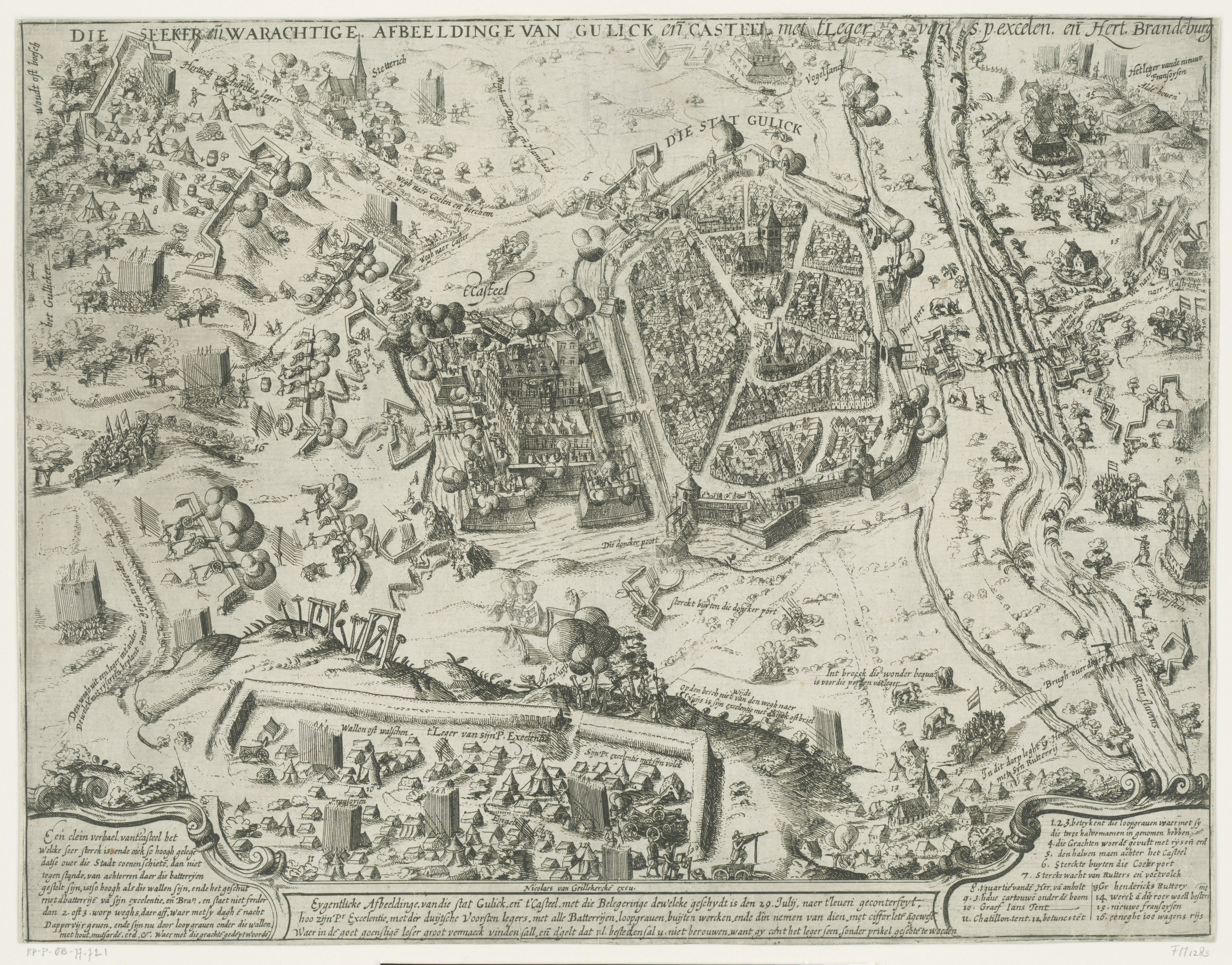
Siege of Jülich

In November, the parties met at Cologne to discuss a peace agreement. The possessors were unwilling to give up anything to the Elector of Saxony, who still claimed a piece of the duchies, and would not accept any compromise with the Catholic party. Thus, the negotiations ended with the possessors still in charge of the duchies, albeit still against Imperial law. Wolfgang Wilhelm and Joachim Ernst took over the duchy by military might, without having been able to secure official recognition.

== Interwar period (1610-1614) ==
Despite military victory, Brandenburg and Neuburg still had many problems to solve. First, the Treaty of Dortmund that proposed a sort of condominium in Jülich-Cleves-Berg was only meant to be a temporary solution. The estates of the duchies also refused to give up power to the Possessors, and the other claimants, such as Saxony, still contested the Possessors.

In December 1610, tension grew as Saxony threatened to invade Jülich in order to enforce their claim. Brandenburg in particular was affected by this, as the two Electorates were neighbors and previously had friendly relations. At the end of January 1611, Brandenburg and Saxon envoys met at Jüterbog. Brandenburg and Saxony did come to an agreement in the Treaty of Jüterbog, in which Saxony was to be included in the provisionary government of Jülich-Cleves-Berg, but eventually the treaty was terminated and only Brandenburg and Neuburg would be Possessors, as Neuburg refused to give up any land to Saxony.

Wolfgang Wilhelm and Joachim Ernst both struggled to rule together. In their first year of rule together, the two constantly quarreled. During the interwar period, Wolfgang was also often abroad, meaning that Ernst had the ability to enforce his will on the duchies. Ernst had converted to Calvinism, and with Wolfgang away, he was able to spread Calvinism throughout the region.

=== Crisis in Aachen ===
In 1611, Protestantism spread to the villages of Stolberg and Weiden, in the vicinity of Aachen. In response, the city council of Aachen imposed a fine on those inhabitants who attended Protestant services. Five citizens were detained for ignoring the town's decree and were banished as they refused to pay the fine. That caused a riot against the council on 5 July. The Catholic counselors were expelled, and many Catholic buildings were sacked. The rebels assaulted the church and the College of the Jesuits, smashed the altars and images and held a mock mass by being dressed in confiscated priestly garments. A new Protestant council was established and appealed for support to the Possessors. In 1612, Rudolf ordered the Possessors to reinstate Catholicism in the city of Aachen under the menace of a ban. The city's Protestants, however, ignored the command and seriously wounded an Imperial commissary sent to implement the Emperor's edict.

=== Wolfgang Wilhelm and Neuburg policy ===
Wolfgang's aforementioned absences from the duchies can be explained by his desires to expand Neuburg's alliance network. Wolfgang tried very hard to forge a marriage alliance with England, but such efforts failed, and in 1613, Princess Elizabeth Stuart married the new Elector Palatine, Frederick V, (Note: Elector Palatine Frederick IV had died on 19 September 1610) meaning that Wolfgang no longer had a chance at acquiring a marriage alliance in England. Then, Wolfgang turned to Brandenburg. He tried to secure a marriage proposal with Johann Sigismund from 1611-1612, but all his attempts in Brandenburg failed too, further damaging relations between Neuburg and Brandenburg.

Wolfgang did succeed in courting Bavaria. Traditionally, Bavaria and Neuburg had close relations. In 1611 and 1612, Wolfgang Wilhelm visited Bavaria several times. Eventually, a marriage offer was proposed between Wolfgang and Magdalene of Bavaria, sister of the reigning Bavarian duke, Maximilian. However, Maximilian wanted his sister's future husband to be a Catholic. Thus, Wolfgang Wilhelm began hinting to Maximillian in May 1612 that he was open to converting to Catholicism. Having lost faith in his Protestant allies, Wolfgang Wilhelm also sought to form an alliance with Spain and the Spanish Netherlands. Negotiations were promising.

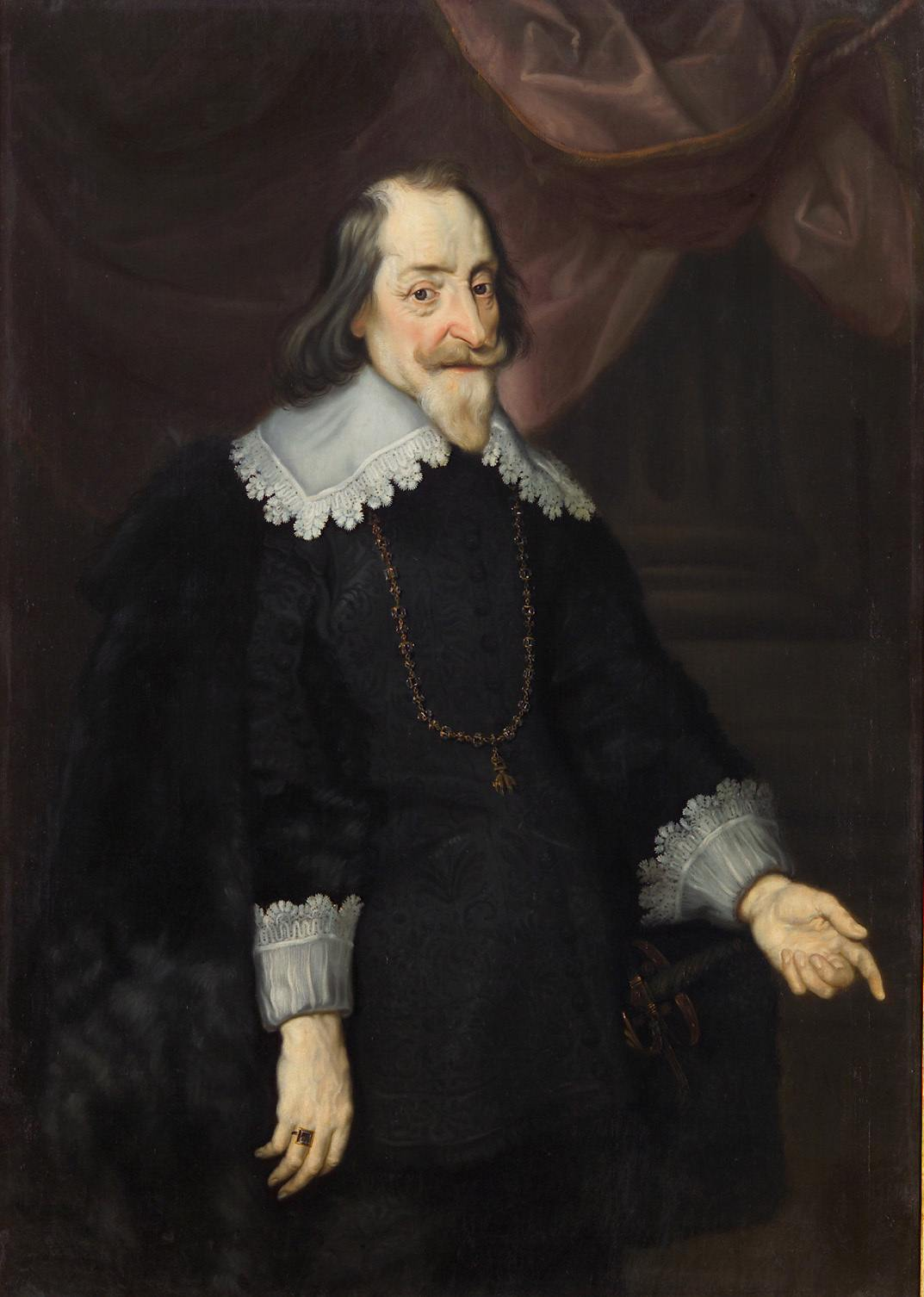
Maximilian I, Duke (later Elector) of Bavaria

In light of the upcoming Imperial meeting at Erfurt, Wolfgang Wilhelm formally proposed to Magdalene, and Duke Maximilian was appointed to be one of the Imperial commissioners at the Erfurt meeting. Seeing this, Brandenburg refused to attend the Erfurt negotiations, as it seemed as if the Imperial commission in Wolfgang's favor.

In 1613 April, negotiations at Erfurt failed. Worse so, after Rudolf's death in 1612, Emperor Matthias had confirmed Saxony's rights to the duchies, which led to more tension. Attempts by Maurice of Hesse-Kassel and the Protestant Union to mediate between the two Possessors failed. On 19 July 1613, Wolfgang Wilhelm converted to Catholicism, securing his alliance with Bavaria. This was temporarily kept secret, in order to keep Wolfgang's ties with both his staunchly Lutheran father, Phillip Ludwig, and the Protestant Union. On November 10, Wolfgang married Magdalene.

The conversion to Catholicism finally brought Spain into the Neuburg camp. The Spanish Council enthusiastically suggested for Spinola, still based in the Spanish Netherlands, to defend Neuburg in the case of a conflict in the duchies. They also agreed to start funding Wolfgang Wilhelm with an annual pension, until Wolfgang inherited Neuburg from his father.

=== Brandenburg policy ===
On Christmas Day, 1613, Johann Sigismund converted to Calvinism from Lutheranism, similarly to Ernst. Johann Sigismund had favored Calvinism for a while, but publicly he remained Lutheran and it was only in 1613 where he decided to officially convert. Part of this came from shifting foreign policy in Brandenburg. No longer needing alliances with Lutheran Saxony and Neuburg (after all Wolfgang Wilhelm was now Catholic), an open conversion to Calvinism was safe.

Another massive change to Brandenburg affairs occurred when Margrave Ernst died on 28 September 1613. In his place, George William, heir of Johann Sigismund, was chosen to be the new Brandenburg viceroy in the duchies. George William was well received in the duchies, and was very popular amongst the Jülich nobility.

=== Conflict amongst the possessors ===
With George William's appointment to govern in Jülich, and Wolfgang Wilhelm's conversion, tension was at an all time high. Wolfgang was jealous of George William's popularity. Additionally, Wolfgang Wilhelm's wife had brought two Jesuits with her, which led to even more quarrels over whether or not she and her Jesuits were allowed to preach in the duchies.

By 1614, the two princes ceased communication with each other. On 21 March, Wolfgang visited Jülich to visit his men, but he was refused entry by the citadel's commander. On the same night, Dutch troops under Brandenburg tried to enter Düsseldorf, another major city in the duchies. Wolfgang Wilhelm was convinced that Brandenburg was conspiring against him, and Wolfgang requested military aid.

Most foreign powers still wanted to maintain peace. Archduke Albert stated that he would intervene on the side of whoever was attacked, but in reality he was anxious to avoid any war, despite the Spanish government preferring Neuburg. Albert contacted Electoral Cologne, the Dutch Republic, France, and England about his hope that the matter could be settled peacefully. However, the efforts of these foreign powers did not improve relations between the possessors.

== Second phase (1614) ==
In May 1614, 300 Dutch troops ejected the Neuburg garrison from Jülich, in a Dutch attempt to prevent a rumored Neuburg coup. The Dutch claimed that they were simply taking Jülich as a neutral party, but the expulsion of Neuburg troops discredited the Dutch claim of neutrality, because Brandenburg soldiers were allowed to remain in the city. Wolfgang Wilhelm interpreted it as a declaration of war, raised 900 troops, and seized Düsseldorf.

=== Negotiations ===
Initial diplomatic efforts centered on a conference in Wesel in June 1614. However, this meeting quickly broke down due to disagreements over preconditions, with Wolfgang Wilhelm demanding the withdrawal of Dutch troops from Jülich, and the Dutch insisted on a halt to Wolfgang's troop levies and fortifications in Düsseldorf. The failure of these talks prompted Archduke Albert to seek mediation from England and France.

King James of England initially showed enthusiasm for mediating the crisis, agreeing to send an envoy to the Dutch. However, his commitment appeared to wane over time, with the English position shifting to assert that England and the Dutch should settle the matter without interference from the Spanish Netherlands. Meanwhile, France's response was less forthcoming, largely due to internal turmoil.

As summer progressed, various parties pressed for renewed peace talks. Georg Wilhelm of Brandenburg, Philip Ludwig (Wolfgang Wilhelm's father), and the Elector of Cologne all sent representatives to The Hague in early July to urge new negotiations. The Dutch expressed willingness to resume talks and even suggested potential frameworks for resolving the dispute. This diplomatic activity coincided with the arrival of an English ambassador in The Hague in early August, tasked with mediating the crisis.

One proposed solution that gained traction was the idea of temporarily sequestering Jülich under a neutral prince. This plan was particularly favored by King James and discussed extensively with Archduke Albert's ambassador. However, choosing an acceptable neutral party proved challenging. While James suggested candidates like Maurice of Hesse-Kassel, there were concerns about finding a truly impartial ruler. Additionally, some parties, including the Dutch envoy in Paris and Wolfgang Wilhelm himself, expressed skepticism about the feasibility and effectiveness of such a plan.

=== Spinola mobilizes ===
Despite negotiations taking place, Archduke Albert and Spinola had begun to prepare for war. After the Dutch had seized Jülich, Albert had requested 400,000 escudos. On June 11, the Spanish government sent an installment of the money, but recommended the Albert and Spinola to maintain peace. However, neither Spinola nor Albert believed peace was possible, as negotiations had not been promising.

Historically, the Dutch Republic had seized the city of Emden on behalf of the city, but ended up occupying the city even after peace. It appeared that the Dutch aimed to do the same with Jülich. Thus, Archduke Albert planned to use Spinola's army to seize several towns before negotiating with the Dutch, in order to have a stronger position before negotiations. Spinola mobilized 13,300 infantry and 1,300 cavalry, planning to challenge the Dutch occupation of Jülich.

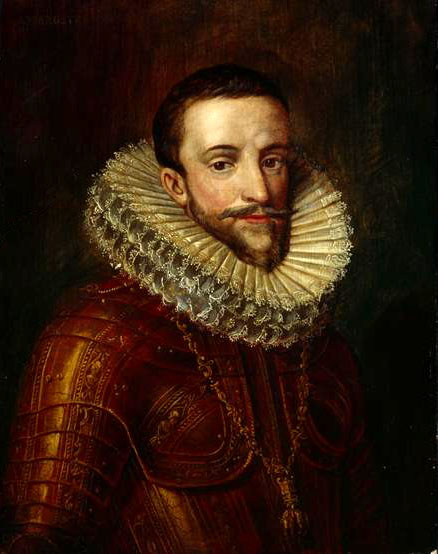
Ambrogio Spinola

The Spanish Council was not pleased with Albert and Spinola's mobilization. Even though the Dutch seizure of Jülich was unacceptable in their eyes, the Spanish Council still did not want to break the truce with the Dutch. Part of this was because Spain was entangled in Italian affairs. Spanish involvement in the War of the Montferrat Succession meant that Spain would have to fight a two-front war if they intervened in Jülich, but despite Spain's requests, Spinola's mobilization continued. However, it was still unknown whether or not the Spanish army was meant for Jülich or for Aachen, which was still under Imperial ban.

=== Sieges of Aachen and Wesel ===
On 20 February 1614, Emperor Matthias had ordered the restoration of the Catholic rule in Aachen. Fearing an attack, the city council had requested the aid of George William, who sent several hundred soldiers under General Georg von Pulitz to reinforce the local militia.

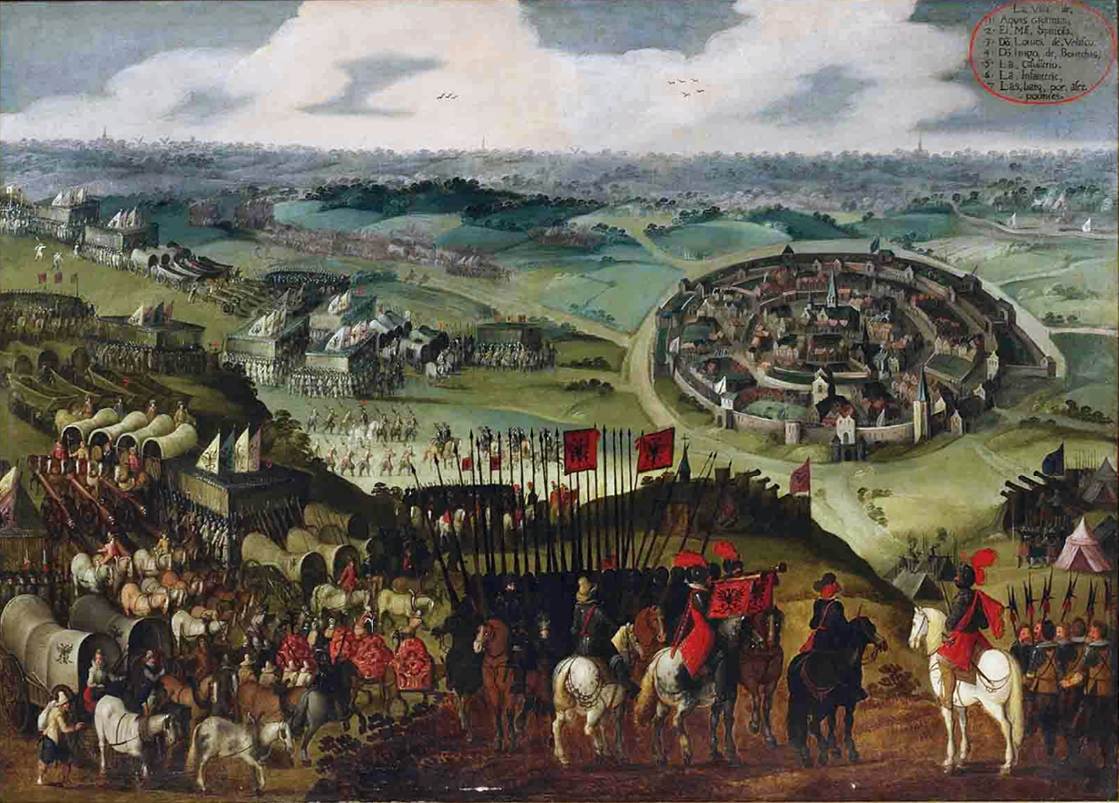
Siege of Aachen, 1614

Spinola decided that he would march to take back Aachen in the name of the Emperor before moving on to securing the Jülich inheritance. On 22 August, Spinola began his march towards Aachen with around 20,000 men. He faced little resistance, and on 24 August, Spinola began to besiege Aachen. After several days of negotiations, the garrison was allowed to leave, together with Protestant clerics and noncitizens. The old city council was reinstated, and the participants of the 1611 riots were punished.

Following the capture of Aachen, Spinola launched a campaign in the disputed territories of the Jülich inheritance. His forces successfully took several key locations, including Neuss, Mülheim, and Wesel. Wesel was a big loss to the Dutch Republic because it was a river crossing that led into the Netherlands, and was crucial for Dutch security.

These conquests significantly weakened the Protestant position in the Rhineland. However, Spinola chose not to lay siege to Jülich itself, deterred by the city's strong defenses and large garrison. In response to Spinola's advances, Maurice of Nassau mobilized a substantial force. He marched towards Rees with an estimated 18,000 men, aiming to counter the Spanish-led offensive. Reacting to Maurice's movements, Spinola maneuvered his army to establish a strategic position near Xanten. Meanwhile, the Dutch occupied Mark and Cleves, and reinforced Jülich. Despite both the Dutch and Spanish army both acting in close proximity, neither side attacked the other, maintaining the truce. A ceasefire was called in September, and a peace conference was prepared.

== Aftermath ==
=== Treaty of Xanten ===
On 13 October 1614, Spinola and Maurice of Nassau initiated peace negotiations. Since both Wolfgang Wilhelm and George William would likely make negotiations harder, it was decided that a Spanish ambassador would be chosen to represent Neuburg, and a Dutch ambassador would represent Brandenburg, with an ambassador from Cologne acting as a mediator. French and English diplomats would also act as mediators. The negotiations were slow, and at first, very little headway was made.

Eventually, the Treaty of Xanten was approved on 12 November 1614. The territories of Jülich-Berg and Ravenstein went to Wolfgang Wilhelm of Neuburg, and Cleves-Mark and Ravensberg went to George William of Brandenburg. Spain gained a total of 62 towns including three crossings of the Rhine (Wesel, Orsoy and Rheinberg), which significantly enhanced its position in North–western Europe. The Dutch retained their garrisons at Jülich and Pfaffenmütze but were now outflanked or even isolated, which put them in an unfavorable position when the Twelve Years' Truce expired in April 1621. Years of war had also devastated the duchies. The Castle of Sparrenburg, for example, had suffered from bandits, arson, and even an earthquake in 1612.

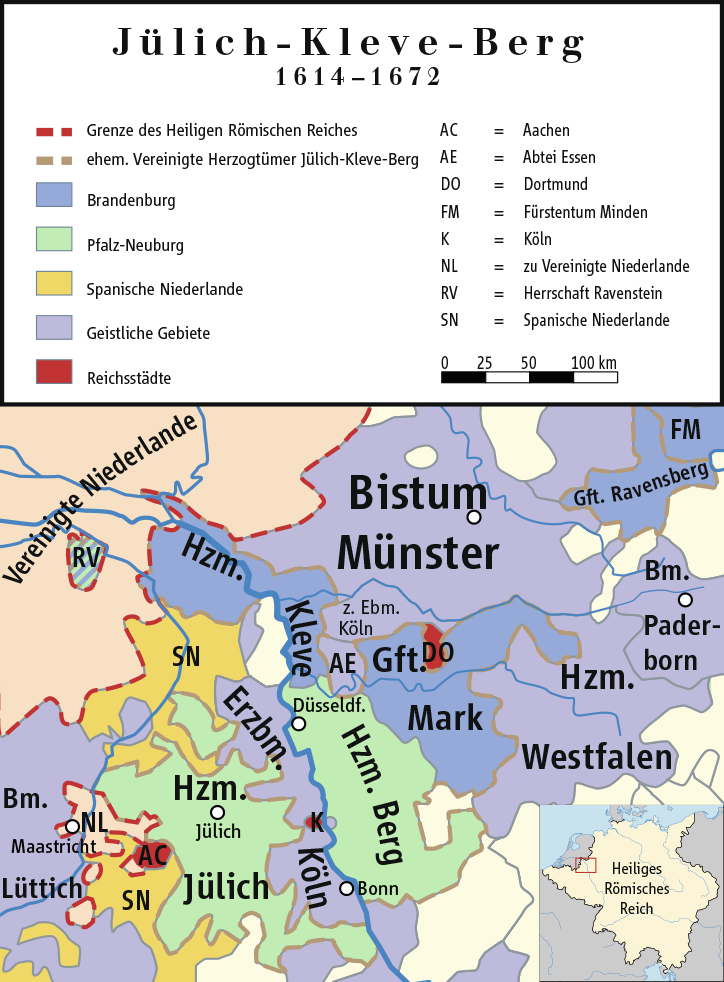
Treaty of Xanten. In blue are territories granted to Brandenburg; in green are territories granted to Neuburg

=== Continued disputes (1614-1741) ===
The Thirty Years' War soon saw further conflict in the duchies, with the Spanish-Dutch conflict spreading to include the Siege of Jülich (1621–1622). The towns in Cleves were protected by the Dutch, but the rest of the territory was raided and burdened with high contributions and stationing, due to the movements of Swedish, Imperial, and Hessian soldiers. Wolfgang Wilhelm pursued a policy of neutrality, despite his political alliances, allowing him to consolidate his rule.

As the Thirty Years' War came to a close, the Great Elector, Frederick Wilhelm of Brandenburg-Prussia, began to focus his western possessions, including the Duchy of Berg, leading to the Düsseldorf Cow War between Neuburg and Brandenburg. Disputes over the Duchies would continue, even after the war.

In 1665, negotiations took a considerable turn. In return for Brandenburg's support for Phillip Wilhelm's (Wolfgang Wilhelm's son and successor) claim to the Polish throne, Neuburg was prepared to cede Ravenstein to Brandenburg. Both rulers were to have equal representation in the Lower Rhenish-Westphalian Imperial Circle. The process of determining the religious denomination practiced by each community was taken. (Note: Information from the German article)

In 1666, the Treaty of Cleves was signed, which significantly reduced the conflict between Neuburg and Brandenburg. The ownership of the dominion of Ravenstein, to which both sides continued to lay claim, was later to be determined by mutual agreement. The estates accepted the treaty, although it meant that the division of the country was finally established. In 1671, Brandenburg gave up its claim on Ravenstein, but reserved the right of succession after the male Neuburg line died out. The Neuburg line eventually inherited the Electoral Palatinate in 1685, and Düsseldorf, the main city in the Duchy of Berg, became the main seat of the Elector Palatines.

It 1741, when the House of Palatinate-Neuburg was on the verge of extinction, a final settlement of the succession dispute was reached by contract between Brandenburg-Prussia and the Electorate of the Palatinate, including the Electorate of Saxony.

== See also ==
- War of the Jülich Succession (German article)
