= Siege of Aachen (1614) =

Spain defeats Aachen and Brandenburg during the War of the Jülich Succession

- Part of War of the Jülich Succession
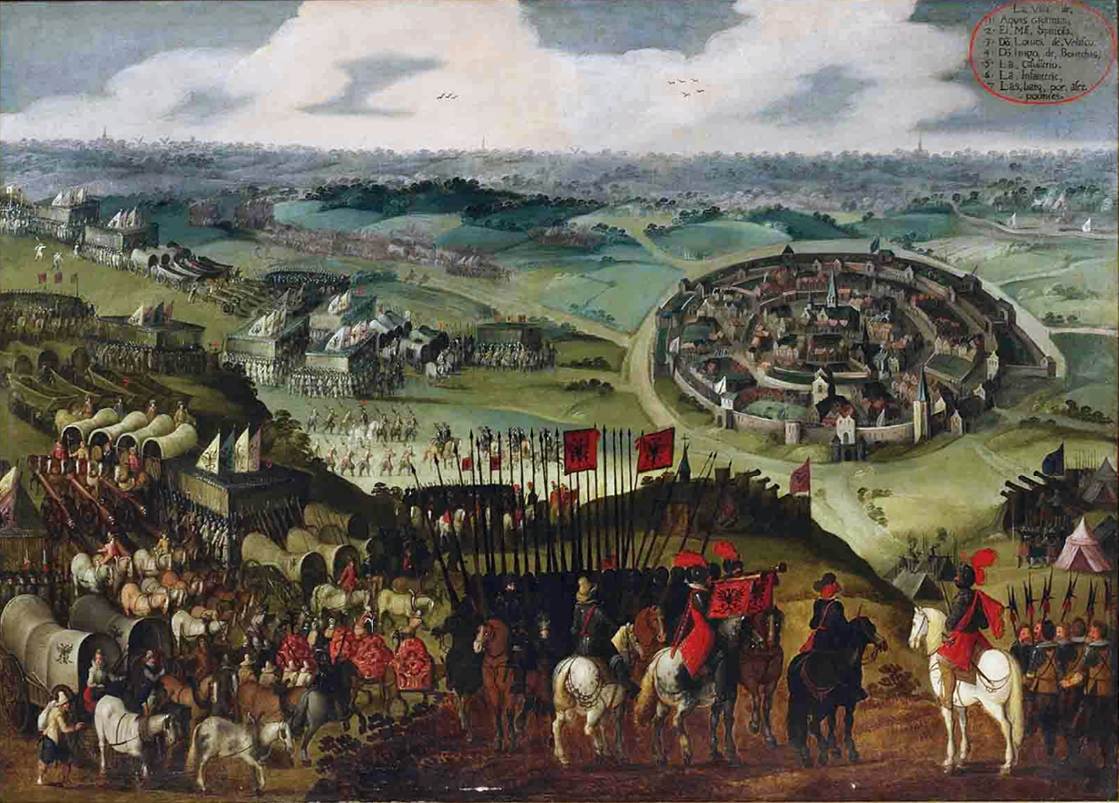
- The siege of Aachen by the Spanish Army of Flanders under Ambrogio Spinola in 1614. Oil on canvas. Attributed to Peter Snayers.
Date	24 August, 1614
Location	Aachen, North Rhine-Westphalia (present-day Germany)
Result	Spanish victory

Belligerents
Free Imperial City of Aachen; Margraviate of Brandenburg	Spanish Empire

Commanders and leaders
George von Pulitz	Ambrosio Spinola

Strength
600 regulars	15,000

Casualties and losses
None	None

The siege of Aachen took place in 24 August 1614, when the Spanish Army of Flanders, led by Ambrogio Spinola, 1st Marquis of the Balbases, marched from Maastricht to Germany to support Wolfgang Wilhelm, Count Palatine of Neuburg, during the War of the Jülich Succession. Despite its status as a free imperial city, Aachen was under the protection of John Sigismund of Brandenburg, Neuburg's ally, and then rival, in the battle for the United Duchies of Jülich-Cleves-Berg. In 1611, the Protestant population of Aachen had revolted against the Catholic city council and had seized power. When the Holy Roman Emperor Rudolf II, observing the Peace of Augsburg, had ordered the previous state to be restored, the Protestants had allied themselves with the Margraviate of Brandenburg. The unexpected arrival of a Spanish army at the gates of the city, however, caused the Protestants to lose courage and surrender Aachen to Spinola. A Catholic garrison was installed and a process of re-Catholicization began.

== Background ==
Aachen was a free imperial city of importance from the times of Charlemagne to the 16th century. It was the place of coronation of the King of the Germans until Maximilian II was crowned in Frankfurt in 1562. Since then, Aachen went into a slow decline. A mainly Catholic city at the time of the Peace of Augsburg, it became religiously divided in the 1560s through the immigration of Protestant refugees from the Netherlands as a consequence of the Spanish persecution during the Dutch revolt. By the 1570s Aachen's population numbered 12,000 Catholics and 8,000 Protestants. The city council and the Emperor tried to exclude the Protestants from political participation in 1581, but thanks to the economic influence of many of the Protestant citizens, Catholics were forced to allow them access to the city council. As jurisdiction over Aachen was claimed by the Duke of Jülich and the Bishop of Liege, both of them Catholics, the Catholic population appealed to the first, who complained to Emperor Rudolf II, claiming that his ecclesiastic rights over Aachen had been violated. In 1593 the Reichshofrat declared that the city council could not change the religious status of Aachen, and therefore the Calvinists had to be expelled from the council. When they tried to resist, Rudolf outlawed the city and gave Archduke Albert, governor of the Spanish Netherlands, the task of enforcing his decision. The subsequent re-Catholicization of the city was conducted by the Archbishop of Cologne.

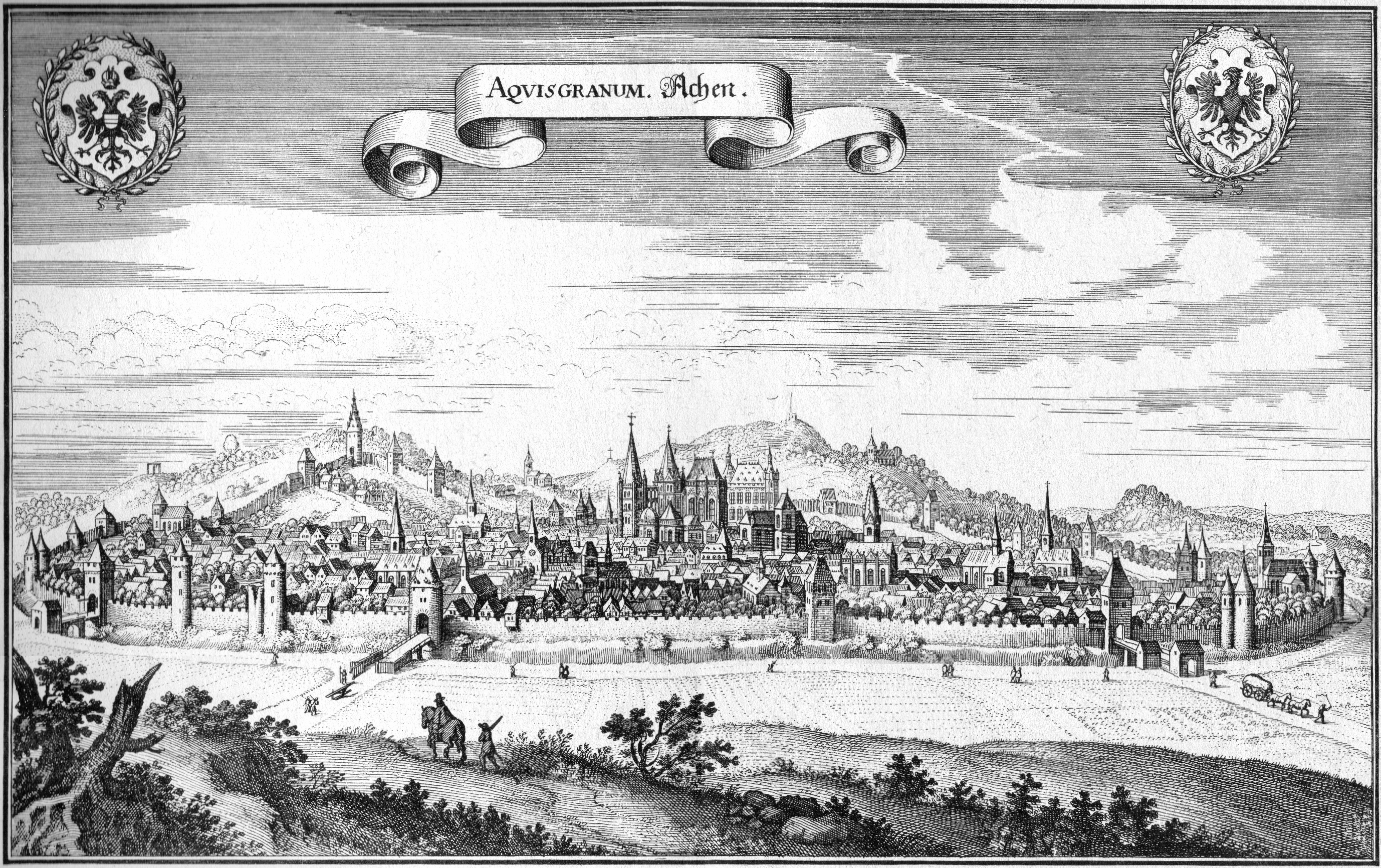
View of Aachen by Matthäus Merian.

In 1611, during the War of the Jülich Succession, the Elector of Brandenburg and the Duke of Palatinate-Neuburg, claimants of the Jülich heirdom in opposition to the Catholic Leopold V, Archduke of Austria, organized Protestant religious services in the nearby villages of Stolberg and Weiden. In response, the city council of Aachen imposed a fine on those inhabitants who attended these services. Five citizens were detained for ignoring the town's decree and banished as they refused to pay the fine. This caused a riot against the council on 5 July. The Catholic counsellors were expelled and many Catholic buildings were sacked. The rebels assaulted the church and the college of the Jesuits, smashed the altars and images, and held a mock mass dressed in priestly garments. One priest was injured and eight others dragged to the city council. A new Protestant council was established and appealed for support to John Sigismund, Elector of Brandenburg, the new Duke of Cleves-Mark.

== Spanish intervention ==
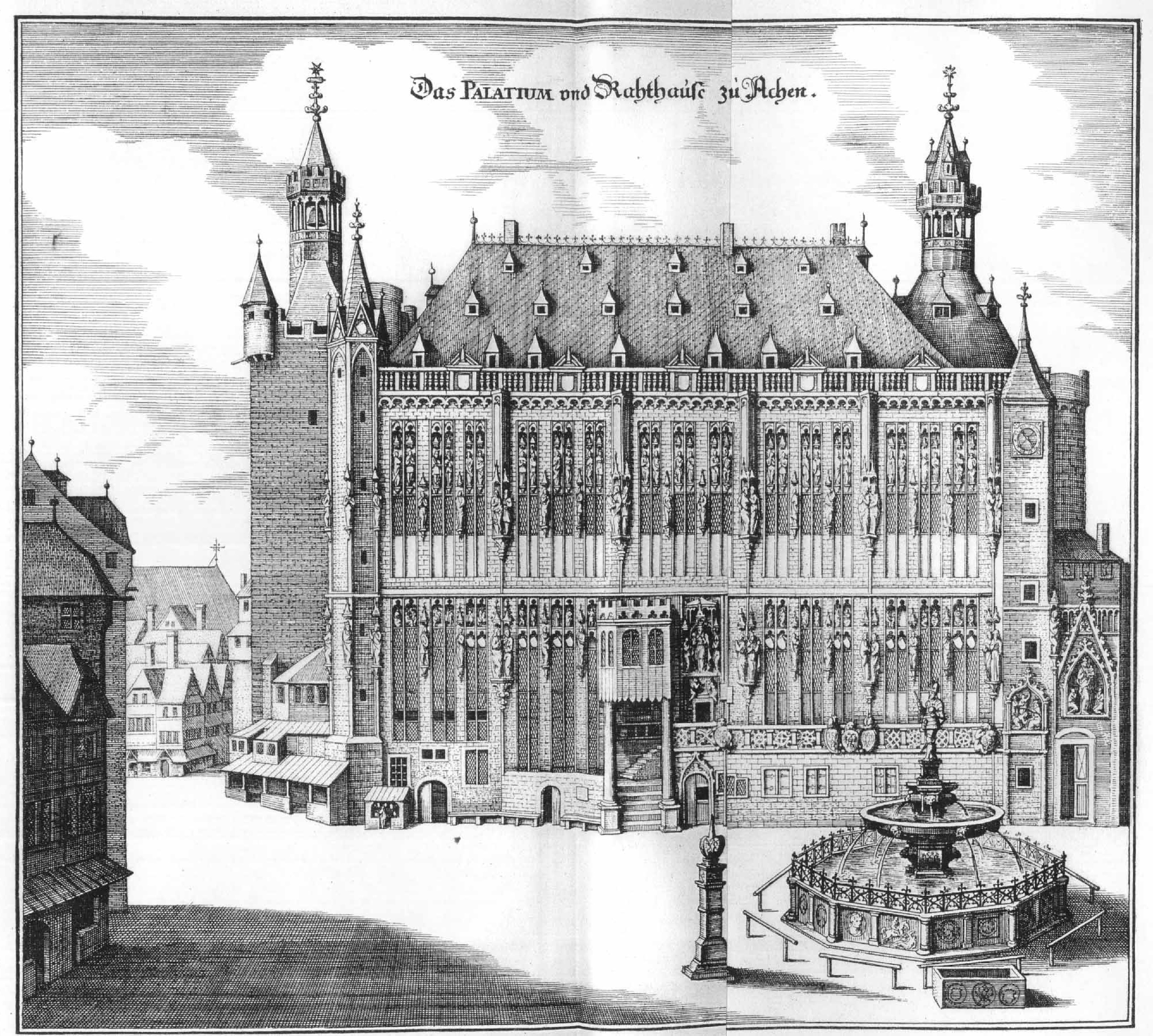
Town hall of Aachen. Engraving by Matthäus Merian.

Rudolf II ordered the princes of Brandenburg and Palatinate-Neuburg to restore the previous religious and political situation of Aachen under the menace of a ban. The Protestants, however, ignored the command and seriously wounded an Imperial commissary sent to implement the Emperor's edict. In May 1612, elections were held and Calvinists took control of the town council. In 1613, as disputes over the Jülich succession continued, one of the claimants, Wolfgang Wilhelm, Count Palatine of Neuburg, converted to Catholicism and gained the support of Spain and of the Catholic League of Germany. On 20 February 1614, Emperor Matthias ordered the restoration of Catholic rule in Aachen, allowing the Spanish Army of Flanders under Ambrogio Spinola to intervene. Fearing an attack, the town council requested help from the Elector of Brandenburg, who sent several hundred soldiers under general Georg von Pulitz to reinforce the local militia. The city gates were manned and partly walled-up.

The Spanish preparations to intervene in the succession dispute alarmed the Dutch statholder Maurice of Nassau, Prince of Orange, who supported John Sigismund of Brandenburg, and knew that the Spanish intervention would destabilize the course of succession. In the middle of June, William Louis, Count of Nassau-Dillenburg, warned Prince Maurice that the Spaniards already had 9,800 men ready for field service, and that they would soon be joined by a further force of 13,200 men. With the imminent Spanish threat, Maurice strongly reinforced the garrison of Jülich with seven infantry companies, and an additional force of 2,000 men, for a possible siege. The situation was tense for the two sides. Maurice, with additional troops from towns that were not under serious threat, expected to be able to raise an army of 20,000 men, composed of 136 infantry companies and 40 cavalry companies. Meanwhile, Ambrogio Spinola was ready to start the campaign. His first movement was upon Aachen:

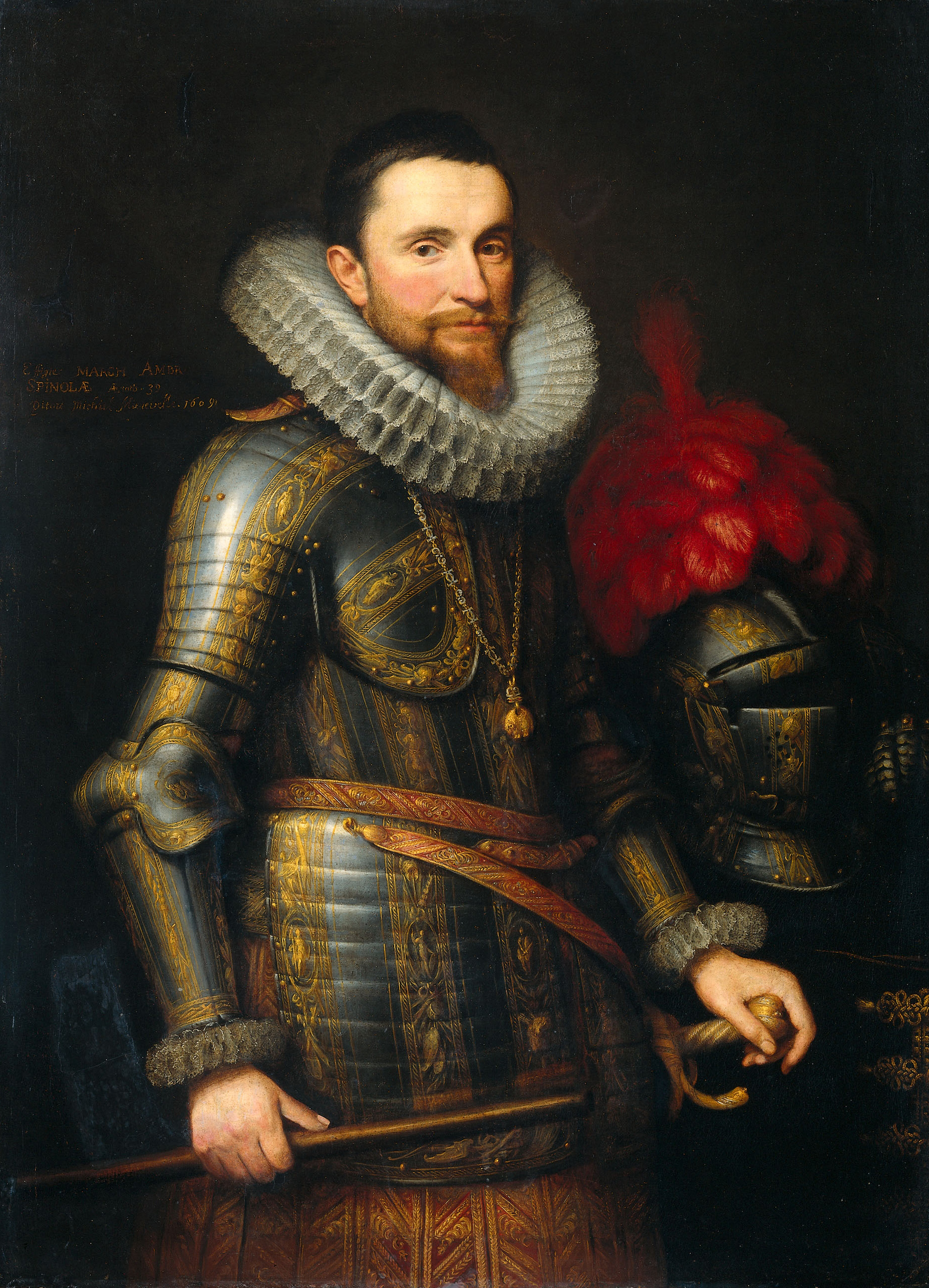
Spanish General Ambrogio Spinola by Michiel Jansz van Mierevelt.

Before we think of the Affairs of Juliers, the vicinity of Aachen ought to engage us to make on that side the first efforts of our army to punish the heretics of that city, and to execute the Imperial Mandate discerned against them, of which the Archduke and the Elector of Cologne are Bearers. Every one knows with what boldness and with what contempt for the Imperial Mandates, the heretic citizens have dar'd usurp the government of Aachen, which belong'd formerly to the Catholics only. Thus an infinity of reasons oblige us to repress by force so unjust an usurpation.

— Ambrogio Spinola to his army, Maastricht, 1614

In August 1614, Spinola advanced to Maastricht and its surroundings and established his camp with an army of 18,000 infantry, 2,500 cavalry, and 11 artillery pieces. From Maastricht, Spinola's army entered the Rhineland accompanied by Guido Bentivoglio, the papal nuncio at Brussels, and two Imperial commissaries. Luis de Velasco, general of the cavalry, opened the way with 600 cavalry, followed by four battalions of foot: one of Spaniards, one of Germans and Burgundians, and two of Walloons. 600 other horses closed the march. To prevent Aachen from being relieved by the Dutch from Jülich, Spinola detached what remained of his cavalry to block the road between the two cities. Two hours after its departure from Maastricht, the Spanish army appeared before Aachen. The city lacked modern fortifications and was surrounded by a single medieval wall. The Spanish troops took the hills which commanded the city, within musket-shot of the walls, and erected a battery to threaten the inhabitants and the 600-man Brandenburgian garrison. After several days of negotiations, and with little hope of reinforcements, the defenders surrendered the city to the Spanish army, to the great regret of Maurice, who could not arrive in time for relief.

== Aftermath ==
The 600 Brandenburg soldiers were allowed to leave Aachen with their flags and were replaced by 1,200 Catholic Germans under the Count of Emden. Although the soldiers of the Spanish army, after several years of inactivity following the beginning of the Twelve Years' Truce (in 1609) with the Dutch Republic, expected to sack the city, Spinola forbade any looting and Spanish troops did not enter the town. The Catholic city council was restored, and, on 10 September, it issued an edict which gave the Protestant preachers three days to abandon the town, and six weeks for the non-citizen Anabaptists and other foreigners to do the same. From then on, only Catholic schools and schoolmasters were tolerated, books labeled as heretics were banned, meat dishes were not allowed to be eaten in inns on the fast days, and a fitting homage was to be paid to the Holy Sacrament and relics when public processions were held. The people who took part in the 1611 rebellion were punished: in 1616 two ringleaders were executed, more than one hundred citizens who participated in the disturbances were exiled, and others were forced to pay a fine.

After the capture of Aachen, Spinola took several towns and castles in the lands disputed by the claimants to the Jülich heritage, including Neuss, Mülheim, and the important German fortress-city of Wesel, which was garrisoned by troops of Brandenburg, As a consequence, the Protestant position in the Rhineland was weakened despite Spinola deciding not to lay siege to Jülich due to the city's strong defense and large garrison. Maurice of Nassau then marched on Rees with an estimated force of 18,000 men. Spinola subsequently established a position near Xanten, whereupon Spinola and Maurice started negotiations about a neutrality pact, leading to the Treaty of Xanten, which ended the War of the Jülich Succession and all hostilities between Wolfgang Wilhelm, Count Palatine of Neuburg, and John Sigismund, Elector of Brandenburg, until 1621. The territories of Jülich-Berg and Ravenstein went to Wolfgang Wilhelm of Neuburg, while Cleves-Mark and Ravensberg went to John Sigismund. Spinola refused to give up the key fortress of Wesel, and further negotiations were necessary, but in the end a shaky peace was maintained.

== See also ==
- League of Evangelical Union
- Thirty Years' War
- Catholic League
- Army of Flanders
- Brandenburg-Prussia
- United Duchies of Jülich-Cleves-Berg
