= Siege of Jülich =

Siege of Jülich may refer to:

- Siege of Jülich (1610)
- Siege of Jülich (1621–1622)
- Siege of Jülich (1814)
