= Treaty of Dortmund (1609) =

1609 treaty that aimed to settle the succession of Julich-Cleves-Berg

The Treaty of Dortmund, or Dortmund Recess, was an agreement that was concluded on 10 June 1609 between representatives of Elector Johann Sigismund of Brandenburg and Wolfgang Wilhelm of Palatinate-Neuburg with regard to the succession of the United Duchies of Julich-Cleves-Berg through the mediation of Landgrave Maurice of Hesse-Kassel. It took place in the city of Dortmund.

== Background ==
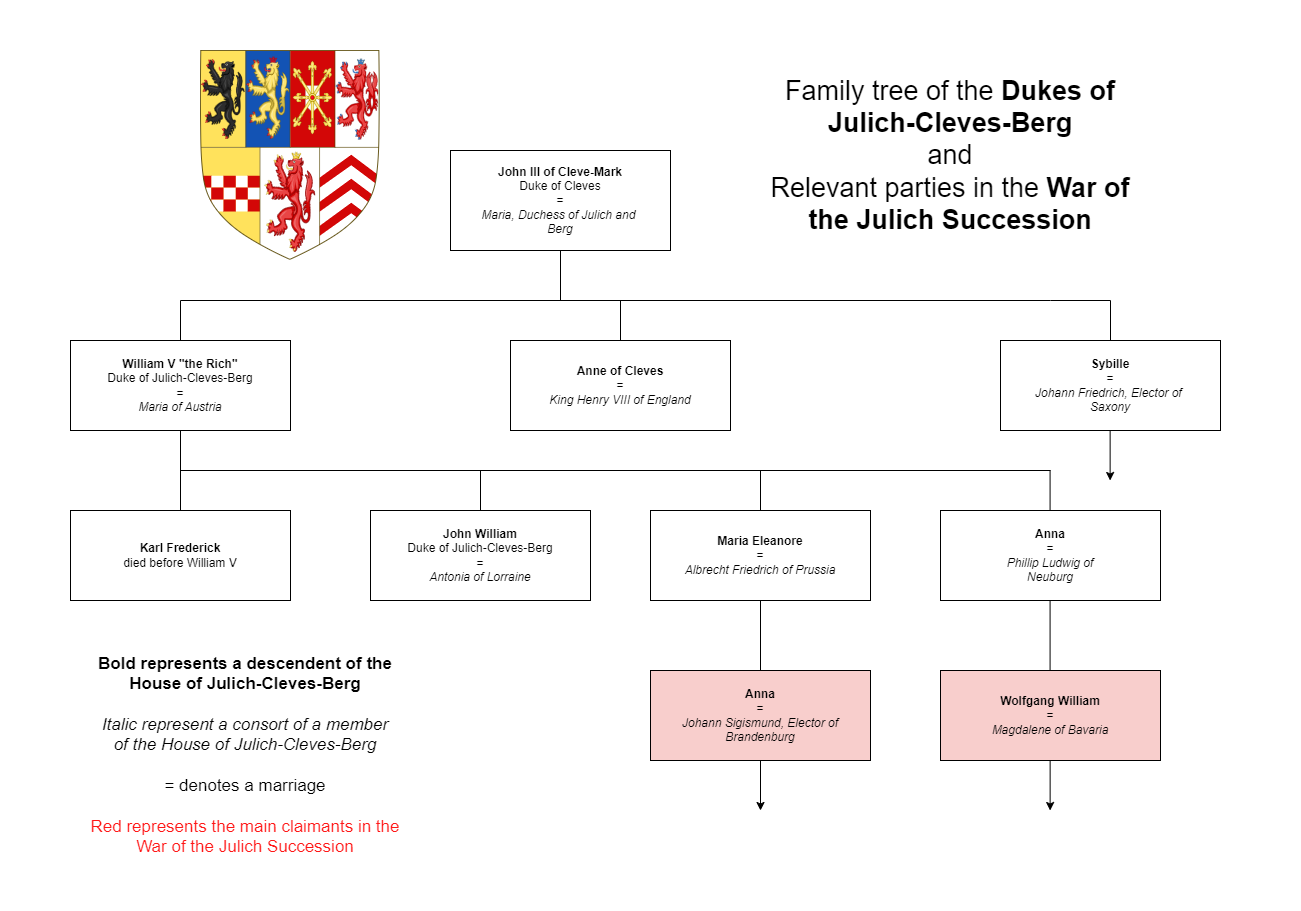
Family Tree of Julich-Cleves-Berg, with claimants highlighted in red

The Duchy of Julich-Cleves-Berg was one of the largest and wealthiest states in the Holy Roman Empire. It was also in a key location, as it was close to the Spanish Road and the ongoing 80 Years War. In addition, with the Protestant Reformation occurring throughout Germany, tension between princes of the Holy Roman Empire were high. Its duke, Johann William, had no children, and thus his inheritance was in dispute.

The two main candidates to the Julich inheritance were the Lutheran Wolfgang Wilhelm of Palatinate-Neuburg and the also Lutheran Johann Sigismund of Brandenburg. There were many attempts to mediate peace between the two parties. King Henry IV of France wanted to ensure that Palatinate-Neuburg and Brandenburg could settle the inheritance peacefully. This was because Henry wanted to keep peace between the Protestant princes of the Empire, so that they could provide a unified front to counter France's historical enemy, the Habsburgs, who were Holy Roman Emperors and Kings of Spain. Thus, Henry communicated with Maurice, Landgrave of Hesse-Kassel, a major Protestant prince, who in turn tried to get Wolfgang and Johann Sigismund to come to an agreement.

Both Wolfgang and Johann Sigismund however believed that they had the superior claim, so negotiations failed. After the death of Johann William, both parties aimed to occupy the duchies. Major Protestant princes in the Empire immediately became alarmed. Elector Palatine Frederick IV, head of the Protestant Union, wished for a peaceful settlement. Johann of Nassau-Siegen advised Maurice to follow the sentiment of the Elector Palatine. Maurice did try again, this time communicating with Brandenburg envoys, but they refused to enter negotiations as they believed that it would weaken their claim.

The Protestant Union then asked Wolfgang's father, Phillip Ludwig, the Count Palatine of Neuburg, to agree to a provisional settlement. Phillip Ludwig expressed desire to negotiate with other claimants. Henry IV of France also aimed to get the Electoral Palatinate, Wurttemberg, and Hesse-Kassel to aid in a resolution. Soon, even the estates of Julich sought for a treaty to determine the succession.

While all of this was happening, Holy Roman Emperor Rudolf II was attempting to enforce his power in Julich. As the Emperor, Rudolf had the authority to decide the fate of the Julich Succession. He sent several Imperial Commissioners to establish a regency council, and sought to have the matter decided in the Aulic Council. These actions were extremely unpopular among the Protestant princes.

== Treaty of Dortmund ==
When Ernst of Brandenburg-Ansbach travelled to Julich to represent Johann Sigismund, he visited Kassel. There, he met with Maurice, who arranged a meeting between Ernst and Wolfgang on 7 June 1609. In three days, the two parties agreed to a settlement.

In the ensuing treaty Johann Sigismund and Wolfgang Wilhelm agreed to jointly manage the disputed property until the dispute was completely settled. Because the Protestant Union distrusted the Aulic Council and the Emperor, it was decided that the agreement would be settled between the claimants and neutral princes. A time limit of twelve months was set to determine the succession, and a chancellery was established to help with the governance.

== Aftermath ==
By 22 July, the Duchies were practically under Brandenburg and Neuburg rule. Henry IV of France was delighted that the Protestants had peacefully settled the succession, at least temporarily.

Despite the fact that the treaty was clearly against the mandate of the Emperor, the claimants attempted to explain that the treaty was signed only for the matter of securing peace. However, Archduke Albert VII, who was the Governor of the Spanish Netherlands, was not happy with this agreement, which he believed was a direct challenge to Imperial authority. Eventually, the Habsburgs would send soldiers to attempt to occupy the Duchies, which would lead to the first phase of the War of the Julich Succession.

The agreement would later be cancelled when Wolfgang Wilhelm converted to Catholicism, and the alliance between him and Johann Sigismund broke due to religious reasons.
