= Treaty of Xanten =

1614 treaty ending the War of the Jülich Succession

The Treaty of Xanten (German: Vertrag von Xanten) was signed in the Lower Rhenish town of Xanten on 12 November 1614 between Wolfgang Wilhelm, Count Palatine of Neuburg and John Sigismund, Elector of Brandenburg, with representatives from England and France serving as mediators. The accord officially ended the War of the Jülich Succession and divided the United Duchies of Jülich-Cleves-Berg between Wilhelm and Sigismund.

== Terms ==
The treaty ended the War of the Jülich Succession and all hostilities between Wolfgang Wilhelm and John Sigismund. Based on the terms of the treaty, the territories of Jülich-Berg and Ravenstein went to Wolfgang Wilhelm and the territories of Cleves-Mark and Ravensberg went to John Sigismund. These last territories were the first provinces at the Rhine and in Westphalia to be governed by the House of Hohenzollern, and were the oldest constituents of the future Prussian Rhineland and the future Province of Westphalia.

== See also ==
- List of treaties

== Sources ==
- Hayden, J. Michael (1973). "Continuity in the France of Henry IV and Louis XIII: French Foreign Policy, 1598-1615". Journal of Modern History. 45 (1): 1–23. doi:10.1086/240888. S2CID 144914347.
