= Wolfgang Wilhelm, Count Palatine of Neuburg =

Duke of Jülich and Berg (1578–1653)

Wolfgang William
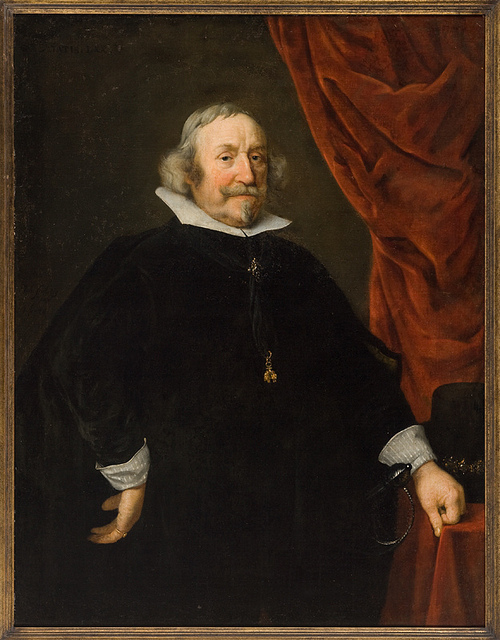
- Portrait by Johannes Spilberg, c. 1648

Count Palatine of Neuburg
- Reign: 22 August 1614 – 14 September 1653
- Predecessor: Philipp Ludwig
- Successor: Philip William
- Born: 4 November 1578; Neuburg an der Donau, Duchy of Palatinate-Neuburg, Holy Roman Empire
- Died: 14 September 1653 (aged 74); Düsseldorf, Duchy of Palatinate-Neuburg, Holy Roman Empire
- Spouse: Magdalene of Bavaria (m. 1613; died 1628) Catharina Elisabeth Charlotte of Palatinate-Zweibrücken (m. 1631; died 1651) Maria Franziska of Fürstenberg-Heiligenberg (m. 1651)
- Issue: Philip William, Elector Palatine; Ferdinand Philip of Neuburg; Eleonore Franziska of Neuburg
- House: Wittelsbach
- Father: Philip Louis, Count Palatine of Neuburg
- Mother: Anna of Jülich-Cleves-Berg
- Religion: Lutheranism (until 1613); Roman Catholicism (from 1613)

Wolfgang Wilhelm von Pfalz-Neuburg (4 November 1578 in Neuburg an der Donau – 14 September 1653 in Düsseldorf) was a German Prince. He was Count Palatine of Neuburg and Duke of Jülich and Berg.

== Life ==
Wolfgang was the son of Philip Louis, Count Palatine of Neuburg, and Anna of Jülich-Cleves-Berg, a daughter of William, Duke of Jülich-Cleves-Berg.

Wolfgang's uncle, John William, Duke Julich-Cleves-Berg had no heirs, so Wolfgang Wilhelm rushed to secure the duchies for himself. Neuburg was small and weak, surrounded by stronger powers like Bavaria and the Electoral Palatinate. Acquiring the Jülich succession would not only provide more land but also enrich the Neuburg economy. Despite his Lutheran religious status, Wolfgang personally traveled to Prague to seek the Emperor's support. He also tried to gain the support of France and England, but these efforts were unsuccessful.

Wolfgang eventually entered negotiations with his main rival over the succession, Johann Sigismund of Brandenburg, and agreed to the Treaty of Dortmund in 1609. However, this treaty would break down when he converted to Catholicism before his marriage to Magdalene of Bavaria in 1613.

Wolfgang eventually agreed to settle the War of the Jülich Succession with his rival claimant, and thus became the first ruler of Palatinate-Neuburg who was also Duke of Jülich and Berg. In 1615, he was made a Knight in the Order of the Golden Fleece. Because he practiced a strict policy of neutrality in the Thirty Years' War, his territories escaped widespread destruction.

Wolfgang moved his residence to Düsseldorf in 1636 and attempted to stabilize and spread Catholicism in his lands. In 1651, disputes over church property led to the short Düsseldorf Cow War.

When Wolfgang died, his son, Phillip William, inherited his lands.

== Marriages and issue ==
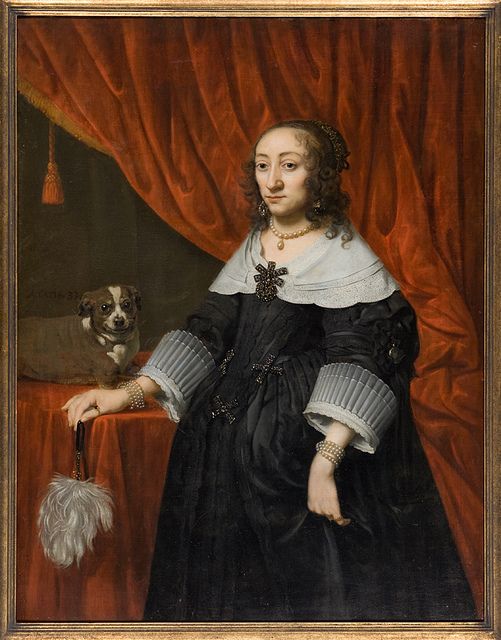
Wolfgang's second wife, Catharina, depicted in 1648.

Wolfgang Wilhelm married three times:

In 1613 to Magdalene of Bavaria, who gave birth to

- Philip William, his successor.

In 1631 to Catharina Elisabeth Charlotte of Palatinate-Zweibrücken, (Note: Catharina was a Calvinist, and was allowed by her Catholic husband to have a Calvinist lady-in-waiting and a Reformed preacher, so long as he lived two miles from their residence.) daughter of John II, Count Palatine of Zweibrücken, who gave birth to:

- Ferdinand Philip, died young.
- Eleonore Franziska, died young.

In 1651 to Countess Maria Franziska of Fürstenberg-Heiligenberg, daughter of Egon VIII of Fürstenberg-Heiligenberg, they had no children.

== Sources ==
- Anderson, Alison D. (1999). On the verge of war: international relations and the Jülich-Kleve succession crises (1609-1614). Studies in Central European histories. Boston: Humanities Press. ISBN 978-0-391-04092-2.
- Asch, Ronald (1997). The Thirty Years War: The Holy Roman Empire and Europe 1618-48. Palgrave Macmillan. ISBN 978-0312165857.
- Dhondt, Frederik (2015). Balance of Power and Norm Hierarchy: Franco-British Diplomacy After the Peace of Utrecht. Brill. ISBN 9789004293755.
- Grant, Arthur James (1938). A History of Europe from 1494 to 1610. Methuen & Co Ltd.
- Lurie, Doron J.; Lev, Nilly (1995). Van Dyck and His Age. Tel Aviv Museum of Art.
- Menchi, Silvana Seidel (2016-01-01). Marriage in Europe: 1400-1800. University of Toronto Press. ISBN 978-1-4426-3750-4.

Wolfgang Wilhelm, Count Palatine of Neuburg House of Wittelsbach Born: 1578 Died: 1653
Regnal titles
Preceded by Philipp Ludwig	Count Palatine of Neuburg; 1614–1653	Succeeded by Philipp Wilhelm
Vacant Title last held by Johann Wilhelm	Duke of Jülich and Berg; 1614–1653	Succeeded by Philipp Wilhelm
