= Siege of Jülich (1610) =

1610 siege during the War of the Jülich Succession

- Part of the War of the Jülich Succession
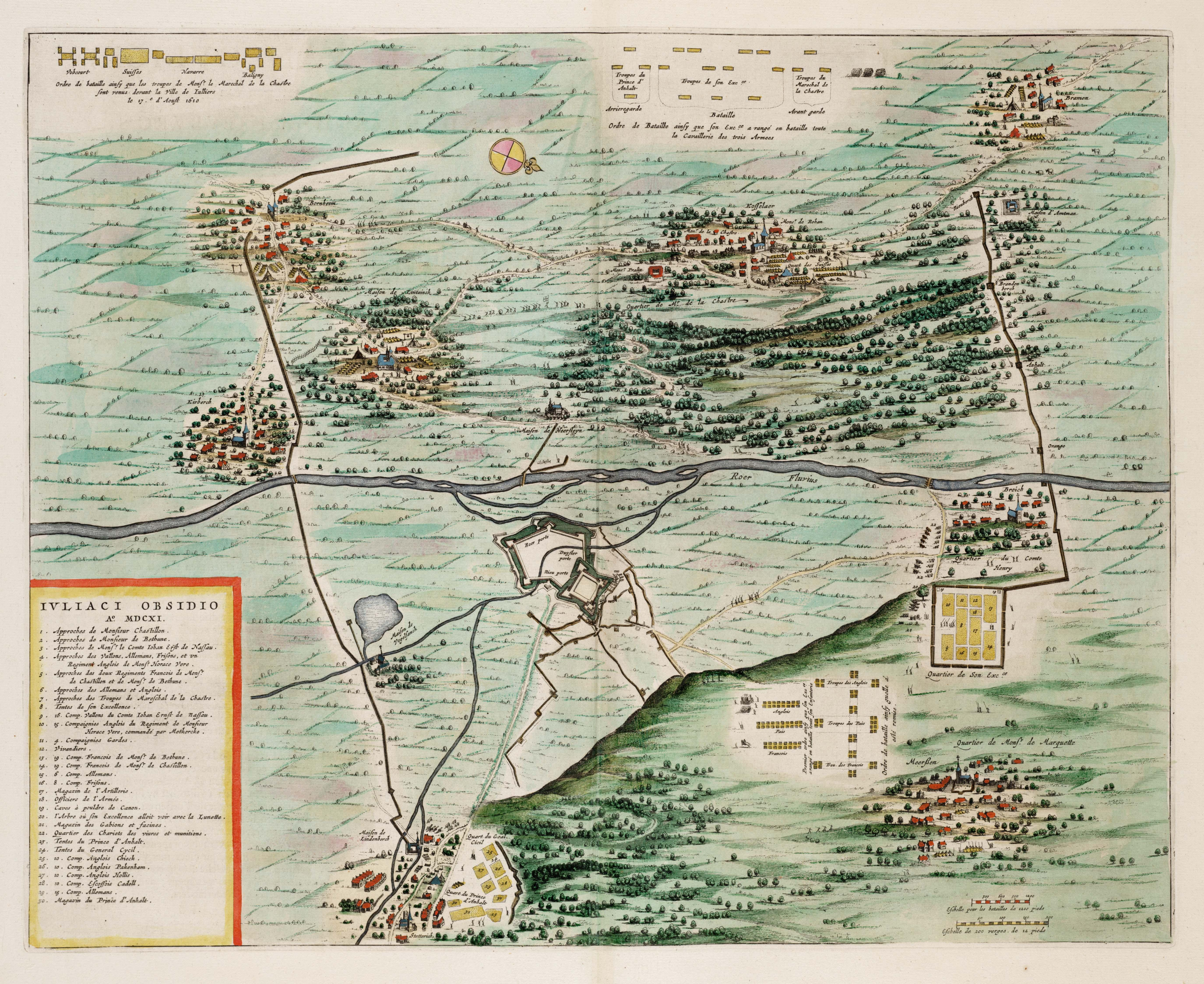
- Siege and capture of Julich by Maurice of Orange in 1610, from the Atlas van Loon
Date	28 July – 2 September 1610
Location	Jülich, United Duchies of Jülich-Cleves-Berg (present-day Germany)
Result	Franco-Dutch-Palatine-Brandenburg victory

Belligerents
Margraviate of Brandenburg; Palatinate-Neuburg; Dutch Republic; Kingdom of France	Forces of Emperor Rudolf

Commanders and leaders
Maurice of Nassau; Claude de La Châtre	Johann von Reuschenberg zu Overbach

The siege of Jülich of 1610 took place from 28 July to 2 September 1610, during the opening stages of the War of the Jülich Succession. After an Imperial force occupied the city of Jülich, a Franco, Dutch, Palatine, and Brandenburg army besieged the city, compelling the Imperials to surrender and withdraw.
