= Kemper Werth =

Promontory in Germany

Coordinates: 50°45′53″N 7°05′10″E

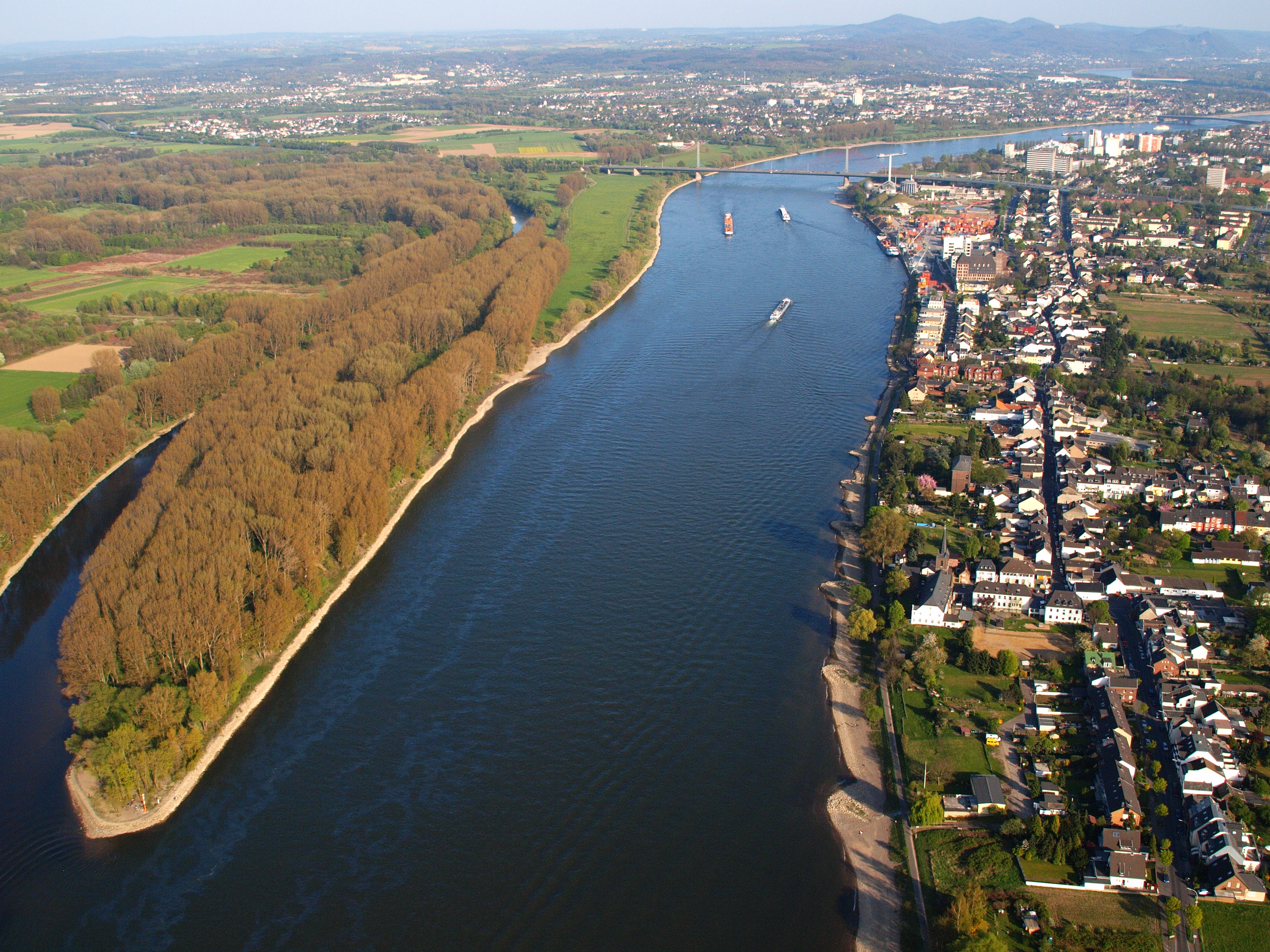
Aerial view of the Kemper Werth and the confluence of Sieg and Rhine, looking south; central Bonn on the right

The Kemper Werth (also known as auf dem Schänzchen and historically as the Pfaffenmütze) is a promontory in the Rhine at the mouth of the River Sieg, in the northeast of Bonn, in Germany. Formerly a pair of islands, it became attached to the river bank as a result of engineering work altering the confluence of the Sieg. It was the site of a fort during the Eighty Years' War and is now part of a protected natural area, the Naturschutzgebiet Siegaue.

== History ==
The Sieg originally flowed into the Rhine through a delta, entering the river at an angle opposite the northern end of the two islands of the Kemper Werth.

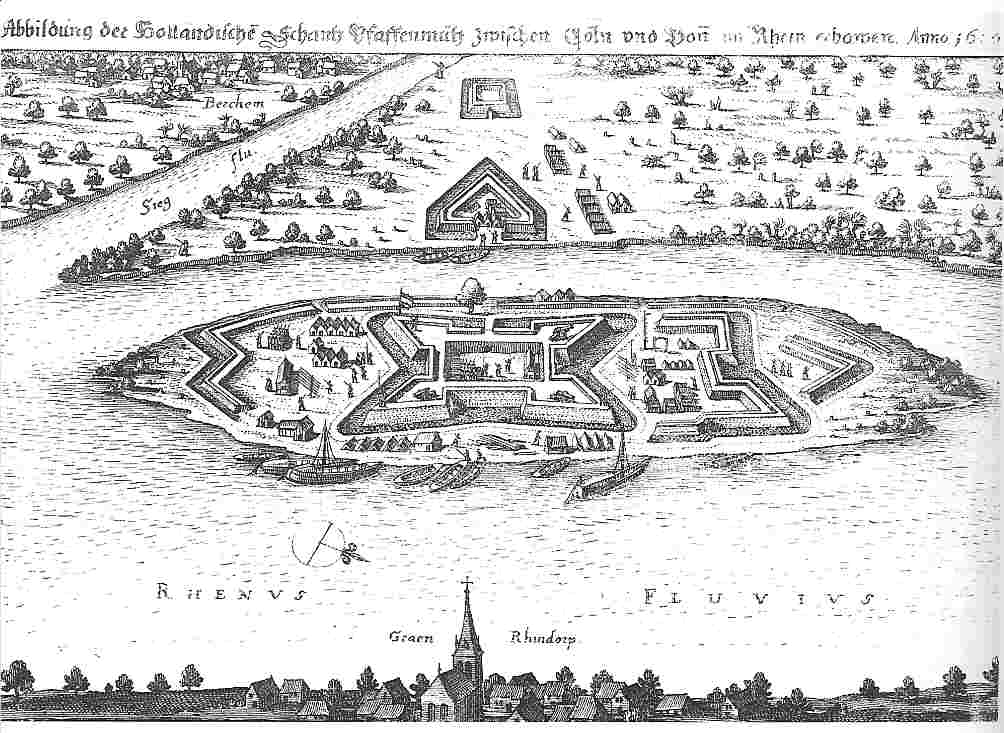
Fort on the Pfaffenmütze, depicted c. 1621 in Matthäus Merian's Theatrum Europaeum

In 1620, the islands were occupied and a fort constructed by forces of the States General of the Netherlands, in one of several pre-emptive strikes against the Spanish and in support of the claim of the Elector of Brandenburg, Georg Wilhelm, to the territories of Jülich-Berg during the Eighty Years' War. In 1622 and 1623, the Spanish took the fort. Only archaeological remnants survive. The double island acquired the name Pfaffenmütze or Pfaffenmütz (priest's cap) at this time, either as a political gibe or because of a resemblance of shape.

In 1877, the Sieg was channelled to flow into the Rhine at almost a right angle, near the then fishing village of Bergheim (now part of Troisdorf), but the river continued to form meanders and loops leading to a total of four river mouths, and there was heavy silt deposition in both the Sieg and the Rhine; the islands became joined and the navigable portion of the Rhine narrowed to a channel beside the opposite bank, the so-called "Rheindorfer Kehle", and flooding occurred at times of high water. In 1851, the Sieg was re-channelled through one of its arms, the "Hartfurth", to restore the angled confluence, with the Rhine bank being built up upstream. Where the primary mouth of the Sieg had been after the earlier works, the Kemper Werth was joined to the mainland at its southern end by a causeway, becoming a promontory; the causeway was raised in 1854 after the Rhine overspilled it. The Sieg now flows almost parallel to the Rhine past the promontory, entering the river between the Mondorf section of Niederkassel and Geislar, which is the northernmost part of Beuel, the right-bank section of Bonn. In the 19th century, a myriametre stone was installed on the promontory; these mark measured points along the course of the Rhine.

In the Second World War the woods in the Sieg floodplain and especially on the Kemper Werth were cut down for fuel and replaced with quick-growing hybrid poplars.

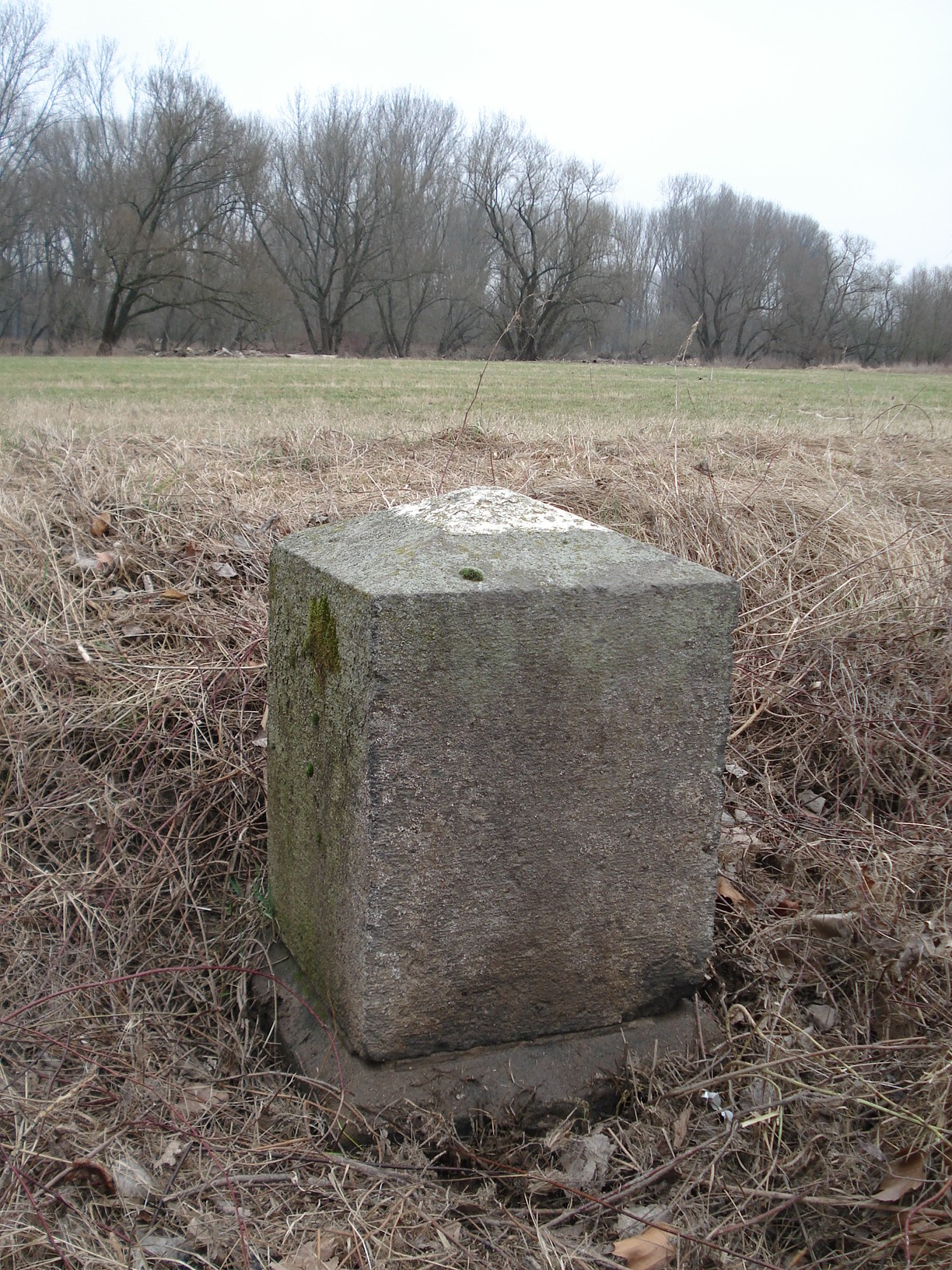
Myriameter stone

== Protected area ==
The Kemper Werth is part of the Naturschutzgebiet Siegaue, which encompasses 150 hectares (370 acres) around the mouth of the Sieg, including former branches of the river and some oxbow lakes. The area was protected in 1985 and in 1998 was declared a flora and fauna habitat under the European Union Habitats Directive. The area is relatively poor in plant variety, although in addition to the poplars and remaining hardwoods, there are some pollard willows. It is ornithologically interesting, attracting rare birds including kingfisher, smew, common merganser, and little ringed plover.

The area is popular for hiking, dog walking, and other recreation. There are plans to restore it to a more natural state, including reduction of nitrogen in the Sieg to encourage a greater variety of plant growth, gradual replacement particularly on the Kemper Werth of the poplars and other introduced species with a mix of native trees, and reversal of measures taken to shore up river banks. The willows are to be retained.
