= List of consorts of Berg =

== Countess of Berg ==
=== House of Berg, 1077–1248 ===
| Picture | Name | Father | Birth | Marriage | Became Countess | Ceased to be Countess | Death | Spouse |
|---|---|---|---|---|---|---|---|---|
| | Adelheid of Laufen | Henry, Count of Laufen | – | – | 1093 husband's accession | 31 July 1106 husband's death | – | Adolf I/II |
| | Adelheid of Cappenberg | Gottfried I, Count of Cappenberg | – | – | 31 July 1106 husband's accession | – | | Adolf II/IV |
| | Ermengard of Sponheim | Engelbert, Duke of Carinthia (Sponheim) | – | – | | 12 October, after 1160 husband's death | – | Adolf II/IV |
| | Margaret of Guelders | Henry I, Count of Guelders (Wassenberg) | – | – | 12 October, after 1160 husband's accession | July 1189 husband's death | – | Engelbert I |
| | Bertha of Sayn | Henry I/II, Count of Sayn (Sayn) | – | – | July 1189 husband's accession | 7 August 1218 husband's death | – | Adolf III/VI |

=== House of Limburg, 1248–1384 ===
| Picture | Name | Father | Birth | Marriage | Became Countess | Ceased to be Countess | Death | Spouse |
|---|---|---|---|---|---|---|---|---|
| | Margaret of Hochstaden | Lothar I, Count of Hochstaden | – | 1240 | 1248/9 husband's accession | 22 April 1259 husband's death | 30 January 1314 | Adolf IV/VII |
| | Elisabeth of Guelders | Otto II, Count of Guelders (Wassenberg) | – | 17 March 1249 | 22 April 1259 husband's accession | 28/9 September 1296 husband's death | 31 March 1315 | Adolf V/VIII |
| | Ermengard of Cleves | Dietrich VI, Count of Cleves (Cleves) | – | – | 28/9 September 1296 husband's accession | 16 April 1308 husband's death | 11 May 1319 | William I |
| | Agnes of Cleves | Dietrich VII, Count of Cleves (Cleves) | – | after 13 May 1309 | | 3 April 1348 husband's death | after 1361 | Adolf VI/IX |

=== House of Jülich, 1384–1389 ===
- None

== Duchess of Berg ==
=== House of Jülich, 1389–1511 ===
| Picture | Name | Father | Birth | Marriage | Became Duchess | Ceased to be Duchess | Death | Spouse |
|---|---|---|---|---|---|---|---|---|
| | Anna of the Palatinate | Rupert II, Elector Palatine (Wittelsbach) | 1346 | 24 May 1363 | 13 February 1389 husband's accession | 25 June 1408 husband's death | 30 November 1415 | William I |
| | Yolande of Bar | Robert I, Duke of Bar (Montbelliard) | c.1378 | 1400 | 25 June 1408 husband's accession | 10 January 1421 | | Adolf |
| | Elisabeth of Bavaria | Ernest, Duke of Bavaria (Wittelsbach) | 1406 | 14 February 1430 | | 14 July 1437 husband's death | 5 March 1468 | Adolf |
| | Sophie of Saxe-Lauenburg | Bernard II, Duke of Saxe-Lauenburg (Ascania) | 1428 | 1444 | | 9 September 1473 | | Gerhard |
| | Elisabeth of Nassau-Saarbrücken | John II, Count of Nassau-Saarbrücken (Nassau) | 19 October 1459 | 19 October 1472 | 18 Aug 1475 husband's accession | 9 March 1479 | | William II |
| | Sibylle of Brandenburg | Albrecht III, Elector of Brandenburg (Hohenzollern) | 31 May 1467 | 8 July 1481 | | 6 September 1511 husband's death | 9 July 1524 | William II |

=== House of La Marck, 1511–1609 ===
| Picture | Name | Father | Birth | Marriage | Became Duchess | Ceased to be Duchess | Death | Spouse |
|---|---|---|---|---|---|---|---|---|
| | Maria of Jülich-Berg | William IV, Duke of Jülich-Berg (Jülich) | 3 August 1491 | 1 October 1510 | 6 September 1511 husband's accession | 6 February 1538/9 husband's death | 29 August 1543 | John |
| | Jeanne III of Navarre | Henry II of Navarre (Albret) | 7 January 1528 | 13 July 1541 | | 1546; Marriage annulled | 9 June 1572 | William III |
| | Maria of Austria | Ferdinand I, Holy Roman Emperor (Habsburg) | 15 May 1531 | 18 July 1546 | | 11 December 1581 | | William III |
| | Jakobea of Baden-Baden | Philibert, Margrave of Baden-Baden (Zähringen) | 16 January 1558 | 16 June 1585 | 5 January 1592 husband's accession | 3 September 1597 | | John William I |
| | Antonia of Lorraine | Charles III, Duke of Lorraine (Lorraine) | 26. August 1568 | 20 June 1599 | | 25 March 1609 husband's death | 23 August 1610 | John William I |

=== House of Wittelsbach, 1614–1806 ===
| Picture | Name | Father | Birth | Marriage | Became Duchess | Ceased to be Duchess | Death | Spouse |
|---|---|---|---|---|---|---|---|---|
| | Magdalene of Bavaria | William V, Duke of Bavaria (Wittelsbach) | 4 July 1587 | 11 November 1613 | 12 November 1614 husband's accession | 25 September 1628 | | Wolfgang William |
| | Catherine Charlotte of the Palatinate-Zweibrücken | John II, Count Palatine of Zweibrücken (Wittelsbach) | 11 January 1615 | 1631 | | 21 March 1651 | | Wolfgang William |
| | Maria Franziska of Fürstenberg-Heiligenberg | Egon VIII, Count of Fürstenberg-Heiligenberg (Fürstenberg-Heiligenberg) | 18 May 1633 | 3 June 1651 | | 20 March 1653 husband's death | 7 March 1702 | Wolfgang William |
| | Elisabeth Amalie of Hesse-Darmstadt | George II, Landgrave of Hesse-Darmstadt (Hesse-Darmstadt) | 20 March 1635 | 3 September 1653 | | 1679 ceded Berg to son | 4 August 1709 | Philip William |
| | Maria Anna Josepha of Austria | Ferdinand III, Holy Roman Emperor (Habsburg) | 30 December 1654 | 25 October 1678 | 1679 husband's accession | 4 April 1689 | | John William II |
| | Anna Maria Luisa de' Medici | Cosimo III de' Medici, Grand Duke of Tuscany (Medici) | 11 August 1667 | 29 April 1691 | | 8 June 1716 husband's death | 18 February 1743 | John William II |
| | Elisabeth Augusta of Palatinate-Sulzbach | Joseph Charles, Count Palatine of Sulzbach (Wittelsbach) | 17 January 1721 | 17 January 1742 | 31 December 1742 husband's accession | 17 August 1794 | | Charles Theodore |
| | Maria Leopoldine of Austria-Este | Archduke Ferdinand of Austria-Este (Austria-Este) | 10 December 1776 | 15 February 1795 | | 16 February 1799 husband's death | 23 June 1848 | Charles Theodore |
| | Caroline of Baden | Charles Louis, Hereditary Prince of Baden (Zähringen) | 13 July 1776 | 9 March 1797 | 16 February 1799 husband's accession | 15 March 1806 annexed to France | 13 November 1841 | Maximilian Joseph |

== Grand Duchess of Berg and Cleves ==
=== House of Bonaparte, 1806–1813 ===
| Picture | Name | Father | Birth | Marriage | Became Grand Duchess | Ceased to be Grand Duchess | Death | Spouse |
|---|---|---|---|---|---|---|---|---|
| | Maria Annunziata Carolina Bonaparte | Carlo Maria Buonaparte (Bonaparte) | 25 March 1782 | 20 January 1800 | 15 March 1806 husband's accession | 1 August 1808 became Queen of Naples | 18 May 1839 | Joachim Murat |

== See also ==
- List of consorts of Cleves
- List of consorts of Jülich
- List of Rhenish consorts
- List of Bavarian consorts
