= List of consorts of Cleves =

== Countess of Cleves ==
=== House of Cleves, 1020/25–1368 ===
Picture	Name	Father	Birth	Marriage	Became Countess	Ceased to be Countess	Death	Spouse
The name of Dietrich I/III's wife is not known.
	Ida of Brabant	Godfrey I of Leuven, Landgrave of Brabant (Leuven)	-	1128		20 February, after 1146 husband's death	27 July, before 1162	Arnold I
	Berta	-	-	-	- husband's accession as junior-count	after 1134 husband's death	8 April, year unknown	Arnold (II)
	Adelheid of Sulzbach	Gebhard III, Count of Sulzbach (Babenberg)	-	-	20 February, after 1146 husband's accession	27 April 1172 husband's death	10 September 1189	Dietrich II/IV
	Margaret of Holland	Floris III, Count of Holland (Holland)	-	1182		27 March 1200/1203 husband's death	after 1203	Dietrich III/V
	Matilda of Dinslaken	-	-	-	27 March 1200/1203 husband's accession	1224		Dietrich IV/VI
	Hedwige of Meissen	Dietrich I, Margrave of Meissen (Wettin)	-	1226		before 2 February 1250		Dietrich IV/VI
	Aleidis von Heinsberg	Henry of Sponheim, Lord of Heinsberg (Sponheim)	-	22 September 1255, contracted	24 May 1260 husband's accession	18 March 1275 husband's death	after 1303	Dietrich V/VII
	Margaret of Guelders	Otto II, Count of Guelders (Wassenberg)	-	1260–1279	18 March 1275 husband's accession	1226		Dietrich VI/VIII
	Margaret of Habsburg	Eberhard of Habsburg, Count of Kiburg (Habsburg)	-	14 July 1290		4 October 1305 husband's death	10 April 1333	Dietrich VI/VIII
	Adelheid of the Marck	Engelbert I, Count of the Mark (De la Marck)	-	-	4 October 1305 husband's accession	-		Otto
	Mechtild of Virneburg	Ruprecht II of Virneburg; Virneburg	-	-		1311 husband's death	after 1360	Otto
	Margaret of Guelders	Reginald I, Count of Guelders (Wassenberg)	1290	7 May 1308	1311 husband's accession	1331/33		Dietrich VII/IX
	Marie of Jülich	Gerhard V, Count of Jülich (Jülich)	-	1340		7 July 1346 husband's death	1353	Dietrich VII/IX
	Mechtild of Guelders	Reginald II, Count of Guelders (Wassenberg)	1325	before 22 February 1348	7 July 1346 husband's accession	19 November 1368 husband's death	21 September 1384	John

=== House of La Marck, 1368–1417 ===
Picture	Name	Father	Birth	Marriage	Became Countess	Ceased to be Countess	Death	Spouse
	Margaret of Jülich	Gerhard VI, Count of Jülich (Jülich)	1350	1369		7 September 1394 husband's death	10 October 1425	Adolph I
	Agnes of the Palatinate	Rupert of Germany (Wittelsbach)	1379	before 1 March 1400		12 February 1401		Adolph II
	Marie of Burgundy	John the Fearless (Valois-Burgundy)	1393	22 July 1406		1417; Became Duchess	30 October 1463	Adolph II

== Duchess of Cleves ==
=== House of La Marck, 1417–1609 ===
Picture	Name	Father	Birth	Marriage	Became Duchess	Ceased to be Duchess	Death	Spouse
	Marie of Burgundy	John the Fearless (Valois-Burgundy)	1393	22 July 1406	1417; Raised to Duchess	23 September 1448 husband's death	30 October 1463	Adolph I
	Elisabeth of Nevers	John II, Count of Nevers (Valois-Burgundy-Nevers)	1439	22 April 1455		5 September 1481 husband's death	21 June 1483	John I
	Mathilde of Hesse	Henry III, Landgrave of Upper Hesse (Hesse)	1 July 1473	3 November 1489		19 February 1505		John II
	Maria of Jülich-Berg	William IV, Duke of Jülich-Berg (Jülich)	3 August 1491	1 October 1510	15 March 1521 husband's accession	6 February 1538/9 husband's death	29 August 1543	John III
	Jeanne III of Navarre	Henry II of Navarre (Albret)	7 January 1528	13 July 1541		1546; Marriage annulled	9 June 1572	William
	Maria of Austria	Ferdinand I, Holy Roman Emperor (Habsburg)	15 May 1531	18 July 1546		11 December 1581		William
	Jakobea of Baden-Baden	Philibert, Margrave of Baden-Baden (Baden)	16 January 1558	16 June 1585	5 January 1592 husband's accession	3 September 1597		John William
	Antonia of Lorraine	Charles III, Duke of Lorraine (Lorraine)	26. August 1568	20 June 1599		25 March 1609 husband's death	23 August 1610	John William
Passed to Brandenburg, See Also List of consorts of Brandenburg

== Grand Duchess of Berg and Cleves ==
=== House of Bonaparte, 1806–1813 ===
Picture	Name	Father	Birth	Marriage	Became Duchess	Ceased to be Duchess	Death	Spouse
	Maria Annunziata Carolina Bonaparte	Carlo Maria Buonaparte (Bonaparte)	25 March 1782	20 January 1800	15 March 1806 husband's accession	1 August 1808 became Queen of Naples	18 May 1839	Joachim Murat

== Notes ==
- nl:Hertogdom Kleef#Heersers van Kleef
- de:Herzogtum Kleve#Herrscher von Kleve
