= John William, Duke of Jülich-Cleves-Berg =

Duke of Jülich-Cleves-Berg (1592-1609)

Johann Wilhelm
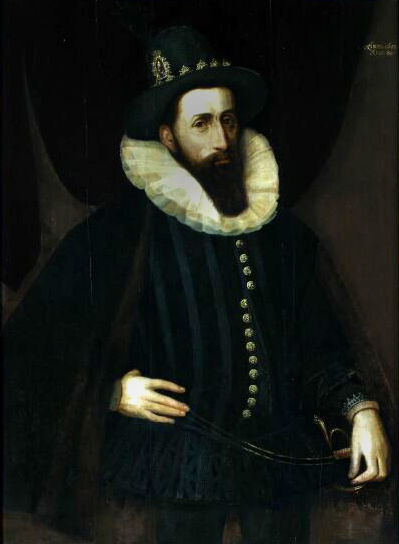
- Portrait by Johan Malthain, 1605

Duke of Jülich-Cleves-Berg
- Reign: 5 January 1592 – 25 March 1609
- Predecessor: William
- Born: 28 May 1562
- Died: 25 March 1609 (aged 46)
- Spouse: Jakobea of Baden (m. 1585; died 1597) Antonia of Lorraine (m. 1599)
- House: La Marck
- Father: William, Duke of Jülich-Cleves-Berg
- Mother: Maria of Austria

Johann Wilhelm of Jülich-Cleves-Berg (German: Johann Wilhelm, Herzog zu Kleve, Jülich und Berg) (28 May 1562 – 25 March 1609) was the last Duke of Jülich-Cleves-Berg.

== Biography ==
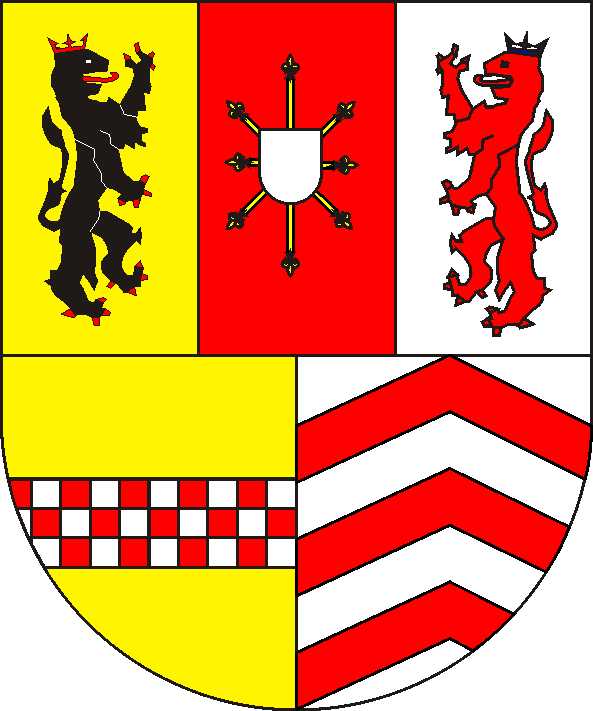
upper: left Jülich, center Cleves, right Berg, down: left La Mark, right Ravensberg

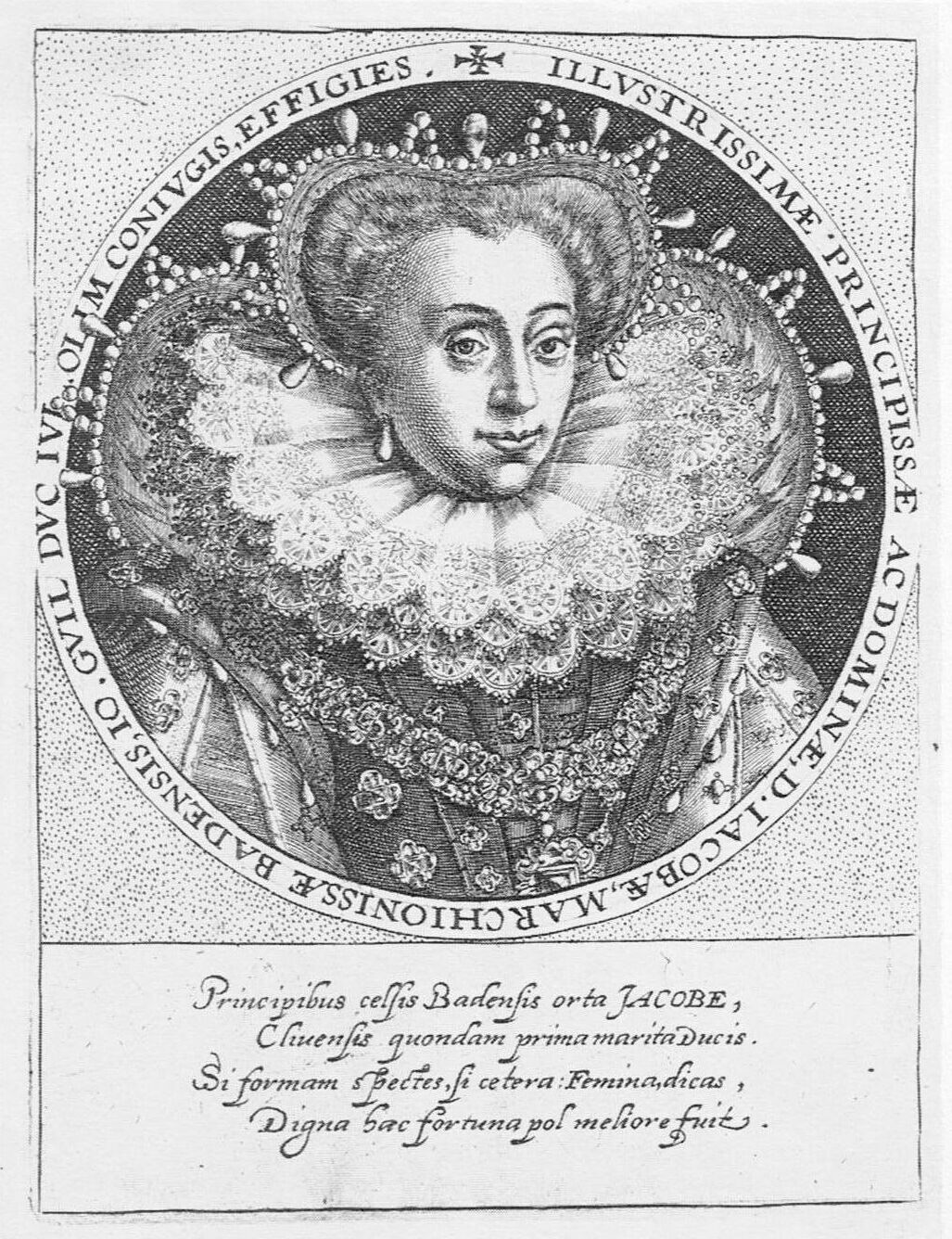
Jakobe von Baden

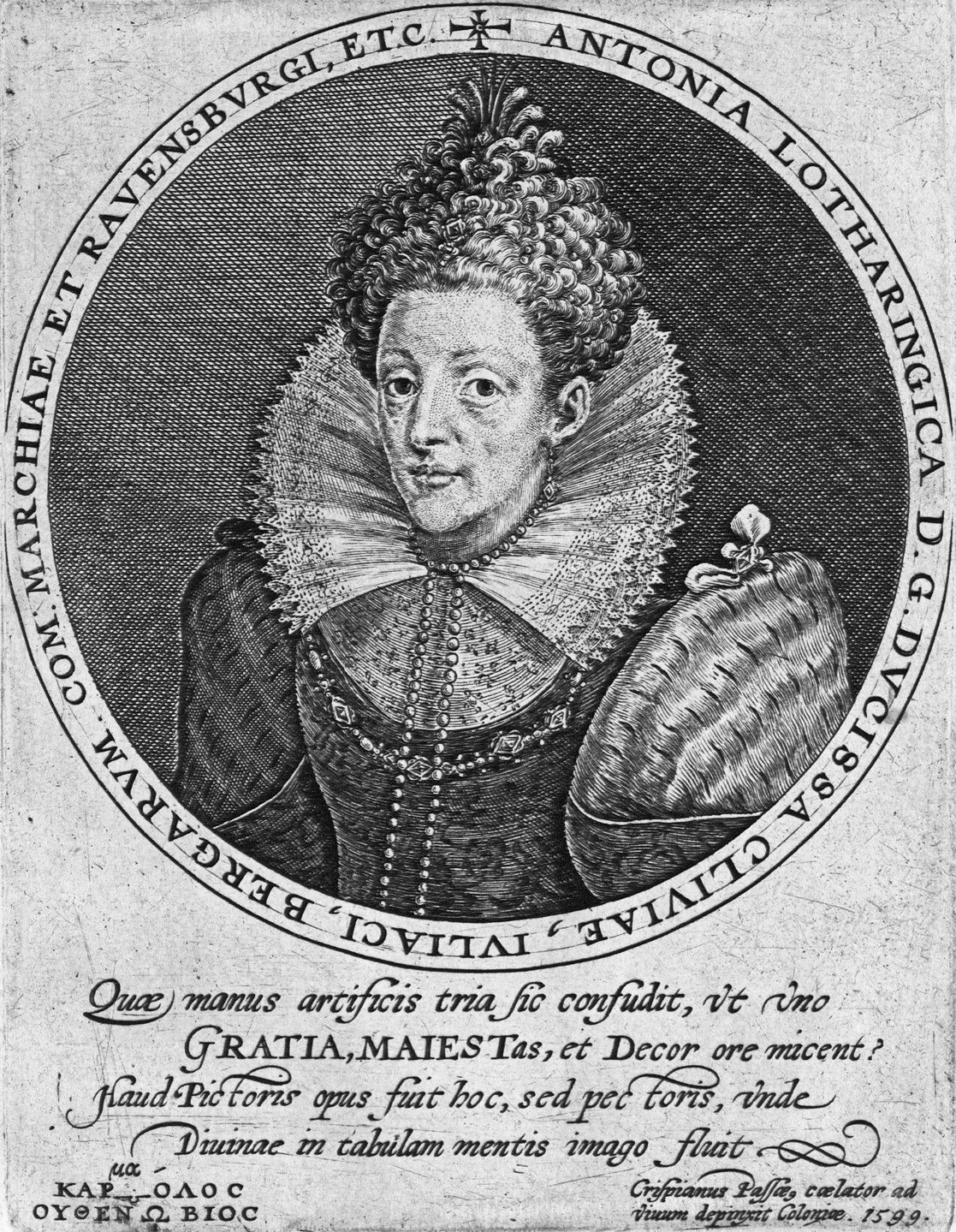
Antoinette de Lorraine

His parents were William the Rich, Duke of Jülich-Cleves-Berg (1516–1592) and Maria of Austria (1531–1581), a daughter of Ferdinand I, Holy Roman Emperor and Anna of Bohemia and Hungary. He grew up and was educated in Xanten. Johann Wilhelm was meant to be Bishop of Münster. However, after the unexpected death of his elder brother Karl Friedrich, Wilhelm was needed to succeed his father as Duke of Jülich-Cleves-Berg, a secular fief. He was also Count of Altena. The United Duchies of Jülich-Cleves-Berg was a combination of reichsfrei states within the Holy Roman Empire.

Johann Wilhelm was first married in 1585 to Jakobea of Baden (d. 1597), daughter of Philibert, Margrave of Baden. He was secondly married to Antonia of Lorraine (d. 1610), daughter of Charles III, Duke of Lorraine. Some believe that Johann Wilhelm also had a morganatic marriage prior to 1585 with Anna op den Graeff, with whom he had a son, Herman op den Graeff. However, no substantial evidence of a relation between Anna and Johann Wilhelm, Duke of Jülich-Cleves-Berg has ever been presented. Johann Wilhelm was subject to a serious mental illness, for which he was treated by the physician Francesco Maria Guazzo. He died on 25 March 1609, leaving no heirs to succeed him.

Upon Johann Wilhelm's death in 1609, his inheritance was claimed by the heirs of his two eldest sisters: the heir of Maria Eleonora of Cleves (1550–1608), the eldest sister and married to Albert Frederick, Duke of Prussia, was Anna of Prussia, the Electress of Brandenburg, a Protestant. The second sister was Anna of Cleves (1552–1632), married to Philipp Ludwig, Count Palatine of Neuburg, whose son and heir was the future Wolfgang Wilhelm, Count Palatine of Neuburg, a convert to Roman Catholicism in 1613.

The disputes between Protestants and Catholics escalated, leading to the Thirty Years' War in 1618, and the succession dispute became part of the war as the War of the Julich Succession. Ultimately, Brandenburg received Cleves-Mark and Neuburg received Jülich-Berg, after the lands had been trampled under military several times and lost much of the fabled wealth so renowned in Duke Wilhelm's time.

Among his court servants and employees were the composer Konrad Hagius.

== Ancestry ==
Ancestors of John William, Duke of Jülich-Cleves-Berg

16. John I, Duke of Cleves (1419-1481)
8. John II, Duke of Cleves (1458-1521)
17. Elizabeth of Nevers (1439-1483)
4. John III, Duke of Cleves (1490-1538/9)
18. Henry III, Landgrave of Hesse-Marburg (1440-1483)
9. Matilda of Hesse (1473-1524)
19. Anna of Katzenelnbogen (1443-1494)
2. William, Duke of Jülich-Cleves-Berg (1516-1592)
20. Gerhard VII, Duke of Jülich-Berg (c.1416-1475)
10. William IV, Duke of Jülich-Berg (1455-1511)
21. Sophie of Saxe-Lauenburg (before 1428-1473)
5. Maria of Jülich-Berg (1491-1543)
22. Albert III Achilles, Elector of Brandenburg (1414-1486)
11. Sibylle of Brandenburg (1467-1524)
23. Anna of Saxony (1437-1512)
1. Johann Wilhelm, Duke of Jülich-Cleves-Berg
24. Maximilian I, Holy Roman Emperor (1459-1519)
12. Philip I of Castile (1478-1506)
25. Mary of Burgundy (1457-1482)
6. Ferdinand I, Holy Roman Emperor (1503-1564)
26. Ferdinand II of Aragon (1452-1516)
13. Joanna of Castile (1479-1555)
27. Isabella I of Castile (1451-1504)
3. Maria of Austria (1531-1581)
28. Casimir IV Jagiellon (1427-1492)
14. Vladislaus II of Bohemia and Hungary (1456-1516)
29. Elisabeth of Austria (1436-1505)
7. Anna of Bohemia and Hungary (1503-1547)
30. Gaston de Foix, Count of Candale (1448-1500)
15. Anne of Foix-Candale (1484-1506)
31. Catherine of Foix, Countess of Candale (c.1455-bef 1494)

John William, Duke of Jülich-Cleves-Berg House of La Marck Born: 28 May 1562 Died: 25 March 1609
Regnal titles
Catholic Church titles
Preceded by John III of Hoya	Prince-Bishop of Münster as administrator regnant 1574–1584	Succeeded by Ernest of Bavaria
Regnal titles
Preceded by William the Rich	Duke of Cleves, Count of Mark, Count of Ravensberg; 1592–1609	Vacant Title next held by John Sigismund, Elector of Brandenburg
Preceded by William the Rich	Duke of Jülich-Berg; 1592–1609	Vacant Title next held by Wolfgang Wilhelm, Count Palatine of Neuburg
