= Amalia of Cleves =

German princess

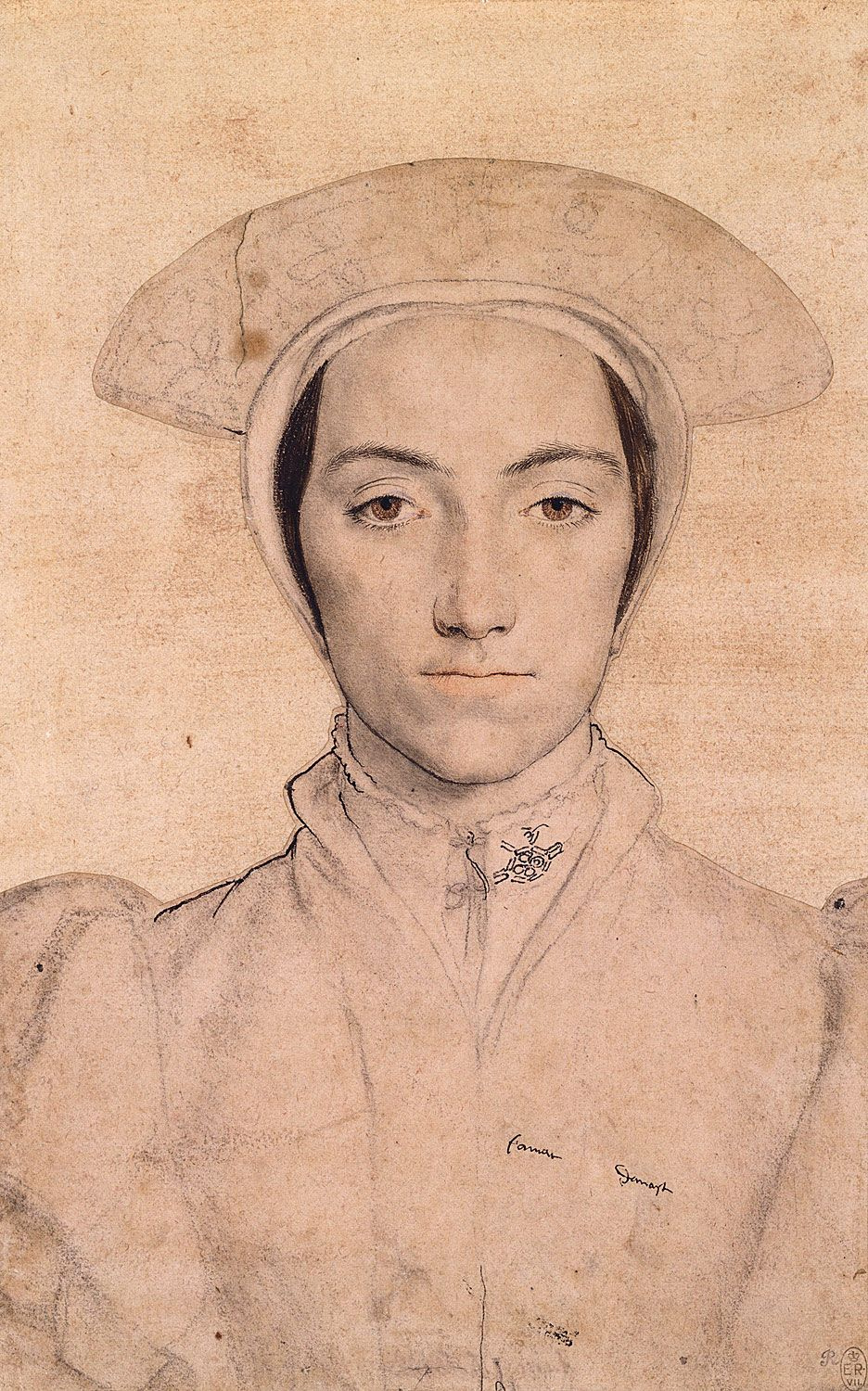
- A sketch, possibly of Amalia of Cleves by Hans Holbein the Younger
- Born: Amalia von Kleve-Jülich-Berg; 17 October 1517; Düsseldorf
- Died: 1 March 1586 (aged 68); Düsseldorf
- Buried: Lambertuschurch, Düsseldorf
- Noble family: La Marck
- Father: John III, Duke of Cleves
- Mother: Maria of Jülich-Berg

Amalia of Cleves (German: Amalia von Kleve-Jülich-Berg; 17 October 1517 – 1 March 1586; sometimes spelled as Amelia) was a princess of the House of La Marck. The fourth and youngest child of John III, Duke of Cleves, and Maria of Jülich-Berg, she was born shortly after the birth of her brother William, a future Duke.

Amalia and her siblings had a grand lineage. She was descended from the kings of England and France and was closely related to King Louis XII of France and the Duke of Burgundy.

== Early life and education ==
All four of John III's children spent their early years together under the care of their mother, Duchess Maria, before William went away to be educated for his future life as duke of Cleves. On the other hand, Amalia and her two sisters, Sibylle and Anne, had an old-fashioned and limited education from a 16th-century viewpoint, in which household arts such as needlework and housekeeping were emphasized to equip the daughters for their roles as wives and consorts to princes, while music and playing instruments, for instance, were not taught. Furthermore, the small German court did not follow the Italian fashion which was common in other European noble families at the time. While growing up, princesses were denied the company of males past 12 years old, including servants.

== Marriage negotiations ==
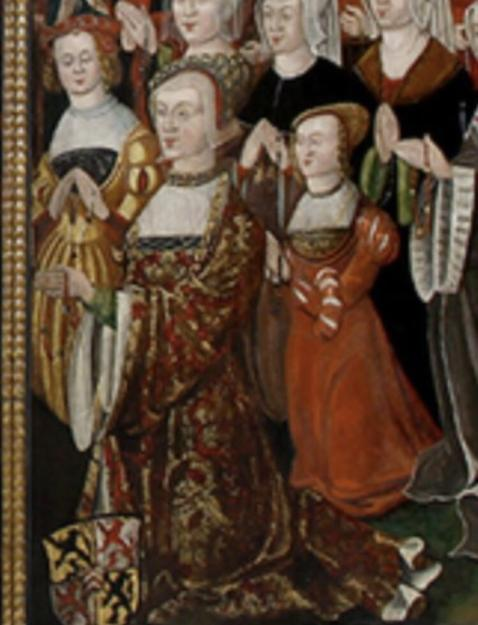
Amalia (in red) with her sister Anne (in yellow), and mother Maria of Jülich-Berg.

King Henry VIII of England was considering a marital alliance with Cleves, so following negotiations with the duchy, Hans Holbein the Younger, Henry's court painter, was dispatched to paint Amalia and Anne for the freshly widowed king in August 1539. After seeing the paintings, Henry chose Anne. It is probable that he chose the elder sister because of her more favorable hereditary rights in her father's duchy.

In the following years, Amalia's family attempted to secure her a marriage with as much profit as possible. There were long negotiations with the Margraviate of Baden concerning a possible strategic marriage between the two dynasties. The margrave had two sons; first, Bernard, who had been turned out due to his immoral and raucous behavior, before being welcomed back after his sisters pleaded with the margrave; and second, Charles, who was born in July 1529 and thus, almost twelve years younger than Amalia. William, respecting his sister, refused to marry Amalia off to someone like Bernard, who he believed could not have children with Amalia due to his dissolute life. The duke also refused to force Amalia to marry Charles, who was but a child. As a result, Amalia remained unmarried.

== Later life ==
William went on to have four daughters and two sons with his wife, Maria of Austria. Amalia helped raise her nieces, who received a Lutheran education, whereas the two sons received a Catholic education. Amalia herself observed the Lutheran faith and was unwilling to allow her nieces to adhere to Catholicism. Amalia's dedication to Lutheranism so enraged her brother that allegedly, at one point, he drew his sword and went after Amalia, before being stopped by a servant.

Amalia also seems to have had a fondness for music and poetry. There is a songbook, the original of which can be found in Berlin, in which Amalia was very interested. The book, which was owned by a friend of Amalia's, contains five hymns to Mary, and twenty-seven love songs. Amalia hand-wrote a poem into the book, about longing for a beloved. Amalia also authored a song book which is currently found in the German national library in Berlin, with copies in the public library of Frankfurt and the university library of Frankfurt.

Anne of Cleves, who remained in England after her marriage to Henry VIII was annulled, bequeathed a diamond ring to Amalia. Amalia died on the first of March 1586 in Düsseldorf, aged 68 years old, having outlived both her sisters.
