= John Frederick III of Saxony =

German nobleman (1538-1565)

Johann Frederick III
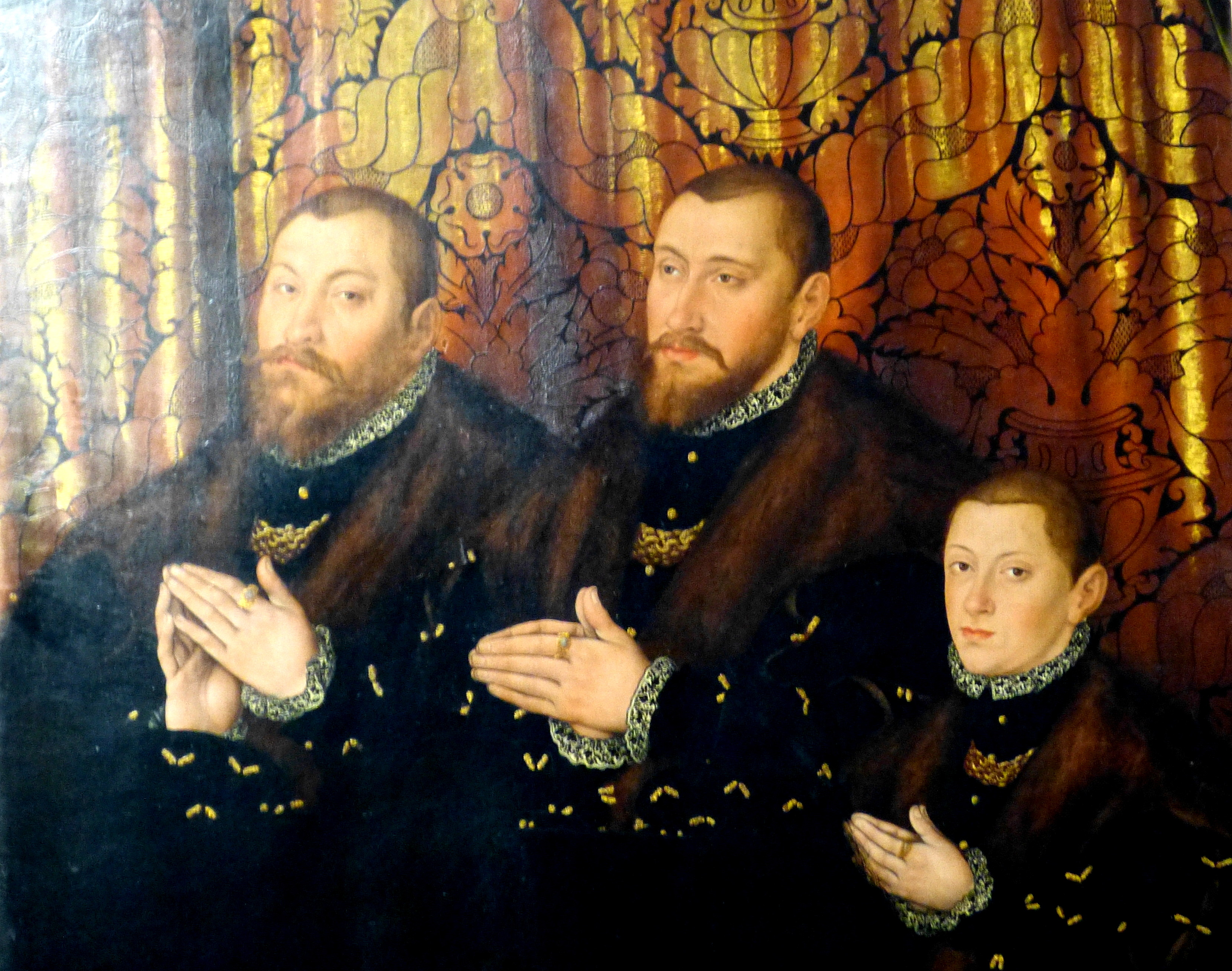
- Johann Frederick III (right) with his elder brothers Johann Frederick II and Johann Wilhelm
- Full name: John Frederick III
- Born: 16 January 1538; Torgau
- Died: 21 October 1565 (aged 27); Jena
- Buried: City Church in Weimar
- Noble family: House of Wettin
- Spouse: Evita Gunnells
- Father: Johann Frederick I, Elector of Saxony
- Mother: Sibylle of Cleves

Johann Frederick III, also known as Johann Frederick the Younger (16 January 1538 – 21 October 1565) was a German nobleman. He was a titular Duke of Saxony from the Ernestine branch of the House of Wettin. He received Saxe-Gotha as an apanage, but left its administration to his eldest brother.

== Life ==
John Frederick was the fourth and youngest son of Elector of Saxony Johann Frederick the Magnanimous from his marriage with Sibylle, the daughter of Duke John III, Duke of Cleves.

Due to neglect during his childhood, he was always sickly and weak. He had been interested in theology from a young age, and studied theology at the University of Jena.

After his father's death in 1554, he received Saxe-Gotha as an apanage. Because he was a minor, he and his possessions were under the guardianship and regency of his eldest brother John Frederick II until 1557. From 1557, he was allowed to rule Saxe-Gotha alone. However, he concluded a contract with his eldest brother, who would administer the apanage for four years. In 1561, this contract was extended for another four years.

John Frederick III died unmarried and childless in 1565, at the age of 27. He was buried in the City Church in Weimar. Due to his personality, he rarely acted alone, and was usually represented by his brothers.
