= Sibylle of Cleves =

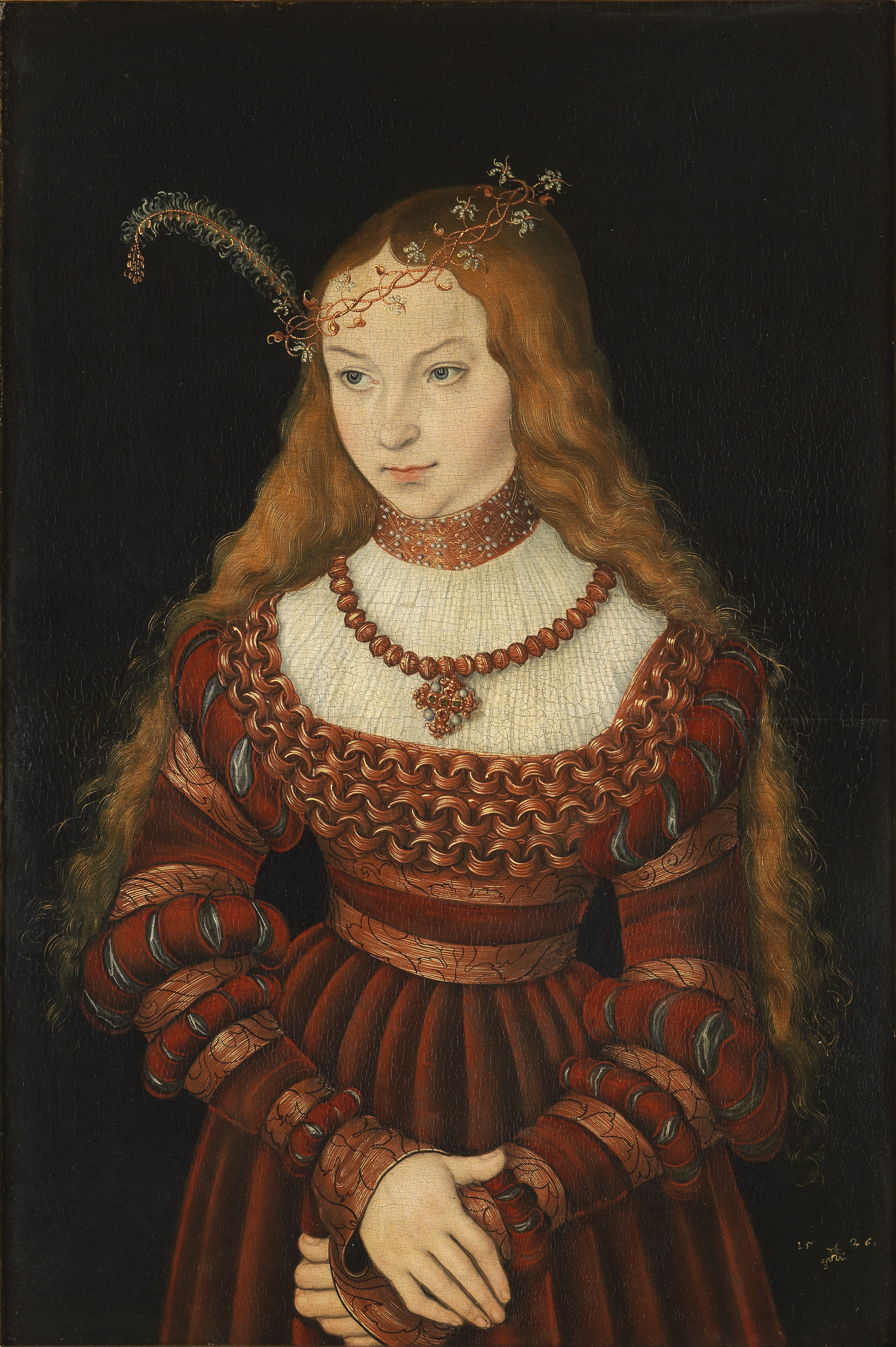
- Sibylle of Cleves at the time of her betrothal to Electoral Prince John Frederick, by Lucas Cranach the Elder, 1526

Electress consort of Saxony
- Tenure: 16 August 1532–4 June 1547
- Born: 17 January 1512; Düsseldorf
- Died: 21 February 1554 (aged 42); Weimar
- Burial: St. Peter und Paul, Weimar
- Spouse: John Frederick I, Elector of Saxony
- Issue Among others: John Frederick II, Duke of Saxony; John William, Duke of Saxe-Weimar; John Frederick III, Duke of Saxony
- House: La Marck
- Father: John III, Duke of Cleves
- Mother: Maria of Jülich-Berg

Sibylle of Cleves (17 January 1512 – 21 February 1554) was electress consort of Saxony.

Born in Düsseldorf, she was the eldest daughter of John III of the House of La Marck, Duke of Jülich jure uxoris, Cleves, Berg jure uxoris, Count of Mark, also known as de la Marck and Ravensberg jure uxoris (often referred to as Duke of Cleves) who died in 1538, and his wife Maria, Duchess of Julich-Berg (1491–1543). Her younger siblings were two sisters, Anne (later Queen of England) and Amalia, and a brother, William, who became Duke of Jülich-Cleves-Berg.

== Life ==
=== Early life ===
Sibylle and her sisters were raised in the Frauenzimmer, the chambers where the duchess Maria and her entourage consisting of female relatives and attendants lived a sort of semi-cloistered existence. No male over the age of twelve was admitted, and at night the women were locked in, the key held by a trusted court official.

Unlike her brother William who was well-educated, Sibylle and her sisters were merely taught to read and write, but only in German. Otherwise, they learned to sew, embroider, and other such domestic matters, but not to play instruments or dance. Sibylle is known to have enjoyed playing chess.

=== Marriage ===
In September 1526, Sibylle was betrothed to Electoral Prince John Frederick of Saxony in the Schloss Burg an der Wupper. After lengthy negotiations about the dowry, the lavish wedding ceremony, preceded by an elaborate procession, took place in Torgau on 9 February 1527. They had four sons.

After the death of his father in 1532, Johann Friedrich became the elector of Saxony and Sibylle the electress. Like her husband, Sibylle was a staunch supporter of the Reformation. The Thuringian reformer Justus Menius dedicated to her the mirrors for princes writing Oeconomia Christiana.

The correspondence between Sibylle and her husband during his captivity as a consequence of the Schmalkaldic War, showed a devoted and intimate couple. In the meanwhile, during the siege of Wittenberg, the electress protected the city in her husband's absence. To save his wife and sons, and to prevent Wittenberg from being destroyed, John Frederick conceded the Capitulation of Wittenberg and resigned the government of his country in favor of Maurice of Saxony.

== Death ==
In 1552, after five years of captivity, the deposed elector was finally reunited with his family. However, the reunion was short-lived: in 1554 both Sibylle and Johan Frederick I died within a month of each other. They were buried in the City Church of Weimar.

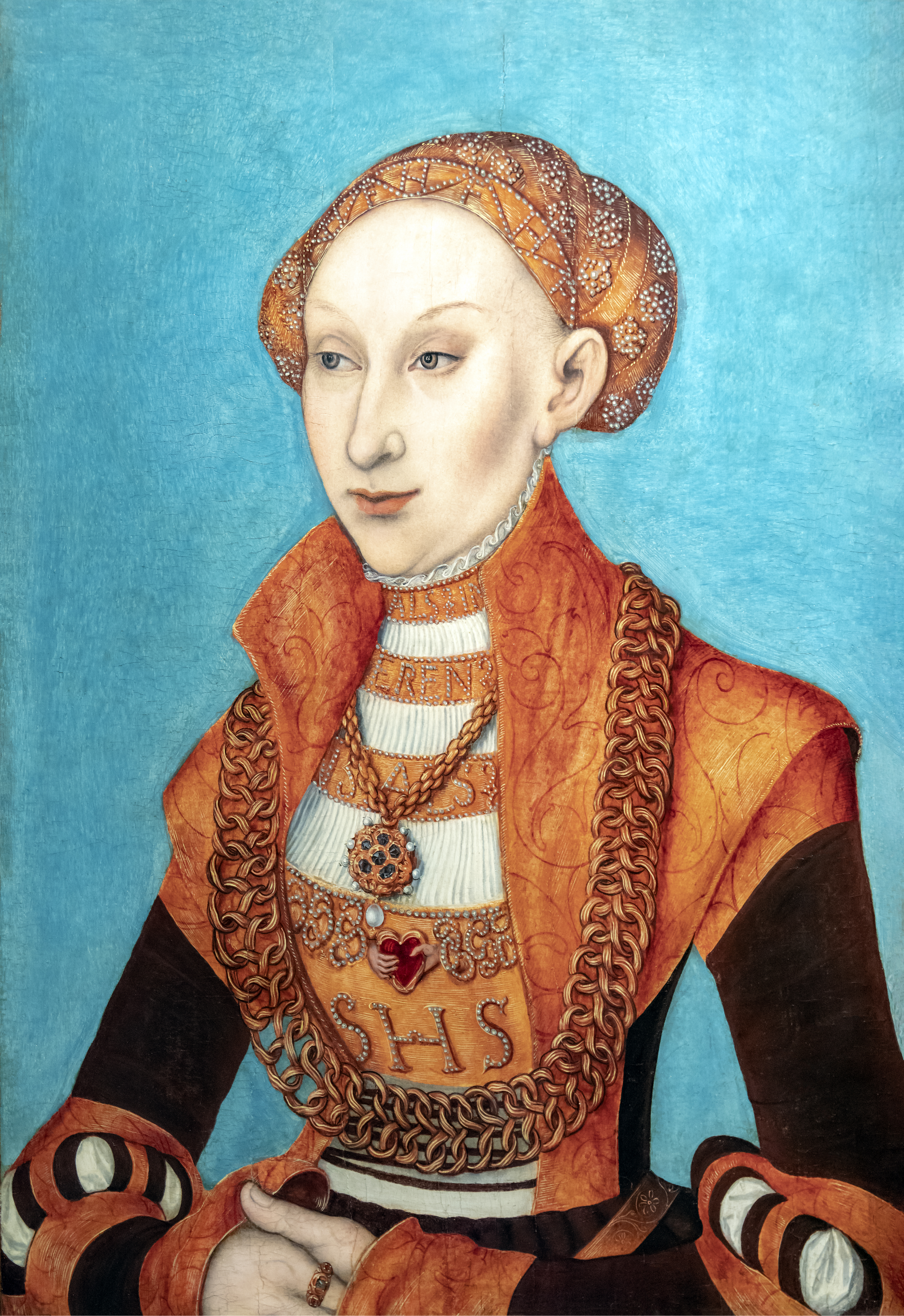
Portrait of Electoral Princess Sibylle of Saxony, by Lucas Cranach, 1531

== Issue ==
- John Frederick II, Duke of Saxony (b. Torgau, 8 January 1529 – d. as imperial prisoner at Schloss Steyr, Upper Austria, 19 May 1595).
- John William, Duke of Saxe-Weimar (b. Torgau, 11 March 1530 – d. Weimar, 2 March 1573).
- John Ernest (b. Weimar, 5 January 1535 – d. Weimar, 11 January 1535).
- John Frederick III, Duke of Saxony, called the Younger (b. Torgau, 16 January 1538 – d. Jena, 31 October 1565).

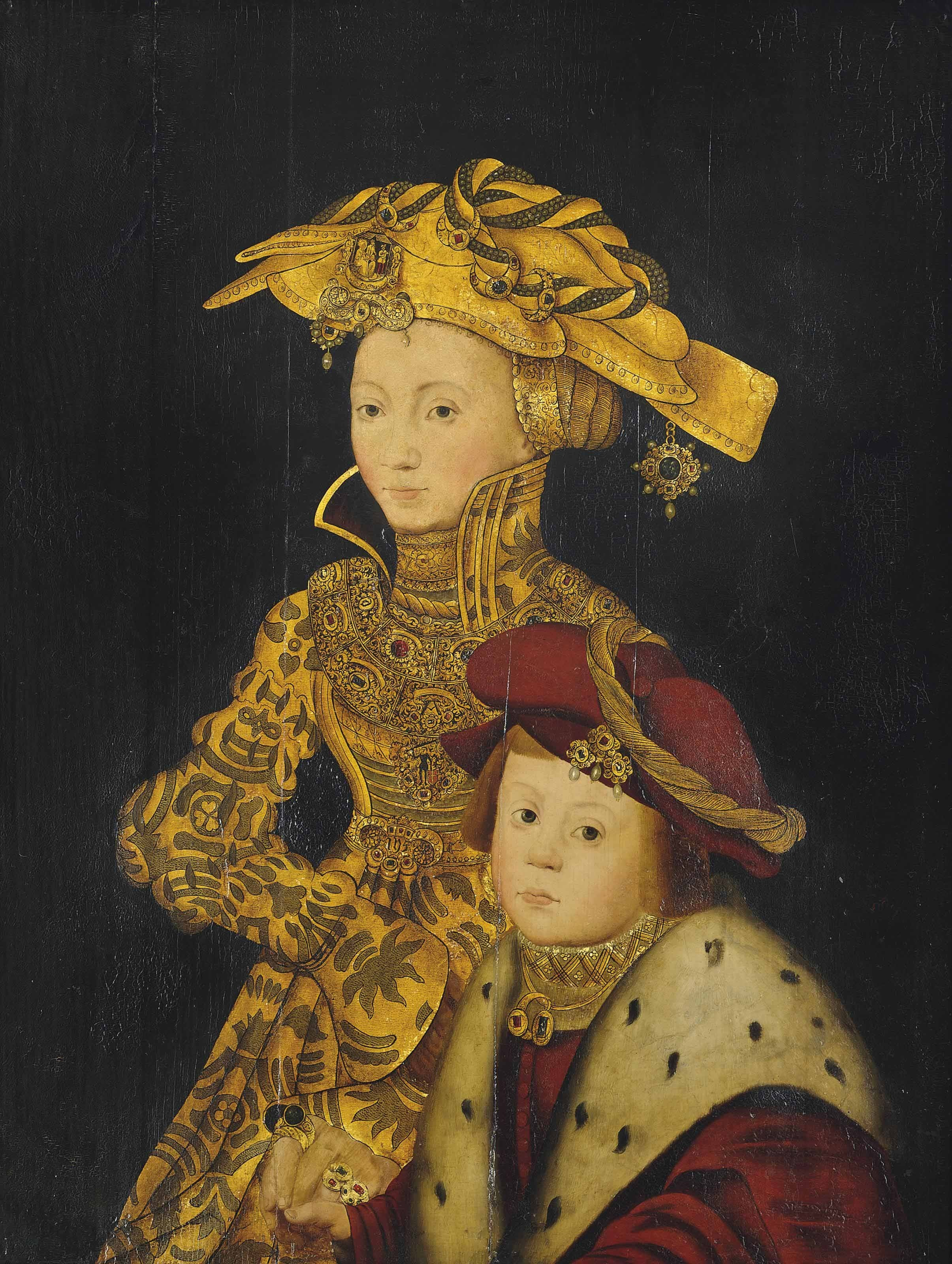
19th-century portrait traditionally identified as Sibylle of Cleves with one of her sons
