= Anne of Cleves =

Queen of England in 1540

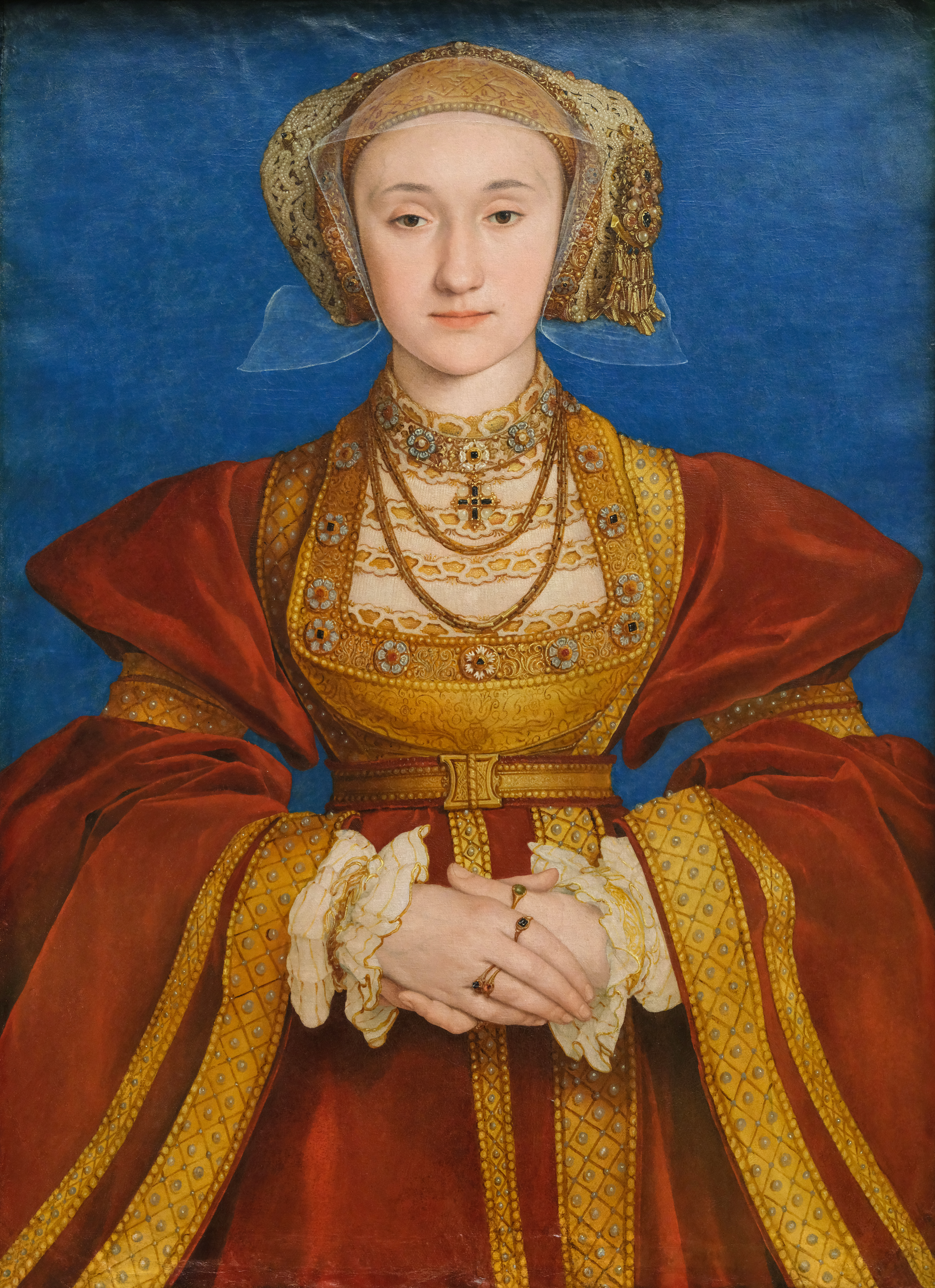
- Portrait, c. 1539

Queen consort of England
- Tenure: 6 January 1540 − 12 July 1540
- Born: 28 June or 22 September 1515; Düsseldorf, Duchy of Berg, Holy Roman Empire
- Died: 16 July 1557 (aged 41 or 42); Chelsea Manor, London, England
- Burial: 3 August 1557; Westminster Abbey
- Spouse: Henry VIII of England (m. 1540; ann. 1540)
- House: La Marck
- Father: John III, Duke of Cleves
- Mother: Maria of Jülich-Berg

Anne of Cleves (German: Anna von Kleve; 28 June or 22 September 1515 – 16 July 1557) was a German princess who briefly became Queen of England in 1540 as the fourth wife of Henry VIII, from their marriage on 6 January until its annulment on 12 July.

Born in Düsseldorf to John III, Duke of Cleves and Maria of Jülich-Berg, little is known about Anne before 1527. She was betrothed to Francis I, Duke of Lorraine, but the marriage did not take place.

In March 1539, Henry started negotiations with the German Protestants to form an alliance against the Kingdom of France and the Holy Roman Empire. He sought to marry Anne, the sister of William, Duke of Jülich-Cleves-Berg, and ordered Hans Holbein the Younger to paint him a portrait of her. Once Henry found it flattering, he agreed to the marriage. Anne arrived in England in December 1539, and met Henry in January, where he surprised her by wearing a disguise.

The difference in Henry and Anne's personalities made them incompatible with each other, and the marriage was annulled on 12 July 1540 following six months with no consummation. Anne received a generous settlement from Henry after the annulment and came to be known as "The King's Beloved Sister". She lived out the rest of her life in England and witnessed the reigns of Edward VI and Mary I, who were both Henry's children. She attended the coronation of Mary I on 1 October 1553, outliving all of her husband's other wives. Anne was interred as a queen at Westminster Abbey following her death in 1557.

== Early life ==
Anne was born in 1515, on either 22 September or 28 June. (Note: Heather Darsie quotes from a contemporary record: "This year [sc 1515] the day before St Peter and St Paul a second daughter was born[…]." The martyrdom of Saints Peter and Paul is celebrated on 29 June. Darsie attributes the incorrect date of 22 September to Maur-François Dantine in his L'Art de vérifier les dates of 1750.) She was born in Düsseldorf, Duchy of Berg, the second daughter of John III of the House of La Marck, Duke of Jülich jure uxoris, Cleves, Berg jure uxoris, Count of Mark, also known as de la Marck and Ravensberg jure uxoris (often referred to as Duke of Cleves) who died in 1538, and his wife Maria, Duchess of Jülich-Berg. She grew up in Schloss Burg on the edge of Solingen.

Anne's father was influenced by Erasmus and followed a moderate path within the Reformation. He decided to side with the Schmalkaldic League and opposed Emperor Charles V. After John's death, Anne's brother William became Duke of Jülich-Cleves-Berg, bearing the promising epithet "The Rich". In 1526, her elder sister Sibylle was married to John Frederick, Elector of Saxony, head of the Protestant Confederation of Germany and considered the "Champion of the Reformation".

In 1527, at the age of 11, Anne was betrothed to Francis, the 9-year-old son and heir of Antoine, Duke of Lorraine but because Francis was under the age of consent (10 years old) at the time of the arrangement, the betrothal was considered unofficial and was cancelled in 1535. Her brother William was a Lutheran but the family was unaligned religiously, with her mother, the Duchess Maria, described as a "strict Catholic". Her father's ongoing dispute over the Duchy of Guelders with Charles V made the family suitable allies for England's King Henry VIII in the wake of the Truce of Nice. The match with Anne was urged on the King by his chief minister, Thomas Cromwell.

== Wedding preparations ==
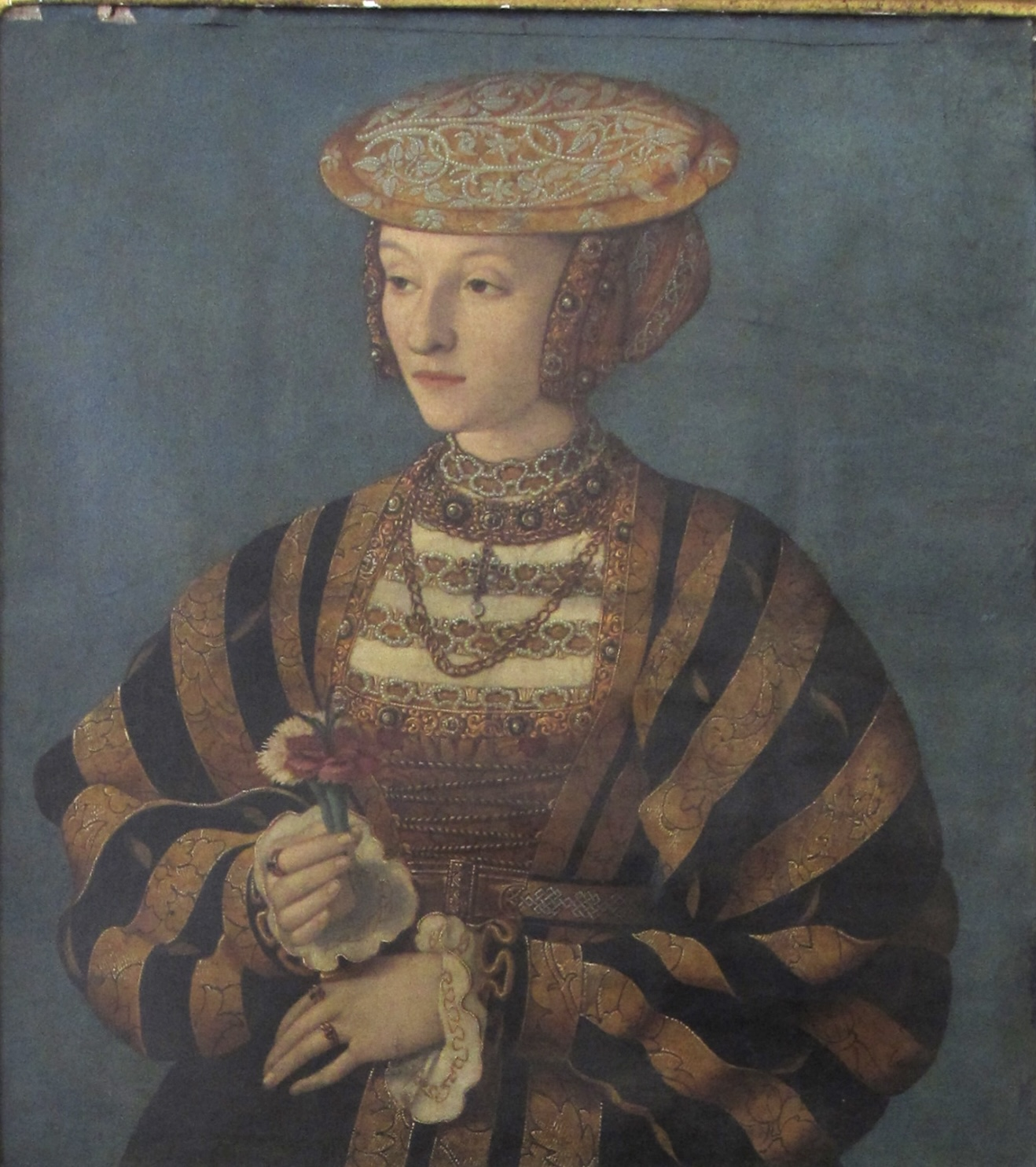
Portrait from 1538

The artist Hans Holbein the Younger was dispatched to Düren to paint portraits of Anne and her younger sister, Amalia, each of whom Henry VIII was considering as his fourth wife. Henry required the artist to be as accurate as possible, not to flatter the sisters. The portraits are now located in the Louvre Museum in Paris and the Victoria and Albert Museum in London. Another 1539 portrait, by the school of Barthel Bruyn the Elder, is in the collection of Trinity College, Cambridge.

Negotiations to arrange the marriage were in full swing by March 1539. Thomas Cromwell oversaw the talks and a marriage treaty was signed on 4 October of that year.

Henry valued education and cultural sophistication in women (e.g., Anne Boleyn), but Anne lacked these traits. She had received no formal education but was skilled in needlework and liked playing card games. She could read and write, but only in German. Anne was considered gentle, virtuous and docile, which is why she was recommended as a suitable candidate for Henry.

Anne was described by French ambassador Charles de Marillac as tall and slim, "of medium beauty, and of very assured and resolute countenance." She was fair-haired and was said to have had a lovely face. In the words of the chronicler Edward Hall, "Her hair hanging down, which was fair, yellow and long ... she was apparelled after the English fashion, with a French hood, which so set forth her beauty and good visage, that every creature rejoiced to behold her." She appeared rather solemn by English standards, and looked old for her age. Holbein painted her with a high forehead, heavy-lidded eyes and a pointed chin.

Anne was initially to travel to England alone with her cortège – the death of her father prevented her brother and mother from travelling – but there were concerns about a beautiful, sheltered young woman who had never travelled by sea making such a journey, especially during the winter. She travelled from Düsseldorf to Cleves, and then to Antwerp where she was received by fifty English merchants.

Henry met her privately on New Year's Day 1540 at Rochester Abbey in Rochester on her journey from Dover. Henry and some of his courtiers, following a courtly-love tradition, (Note: According to Retha Warnicke, this was a long-practised tradition in Europe when a prospective, foreign queen consort arrived in the new country. It was expected that the bride, although well aware of the custom, should pretend not to know her visitor.) went disguised into the room where Anne was staying. The chronicler Charles Wriothesley reported:

Six wives of Henry VIII
and years of marriage

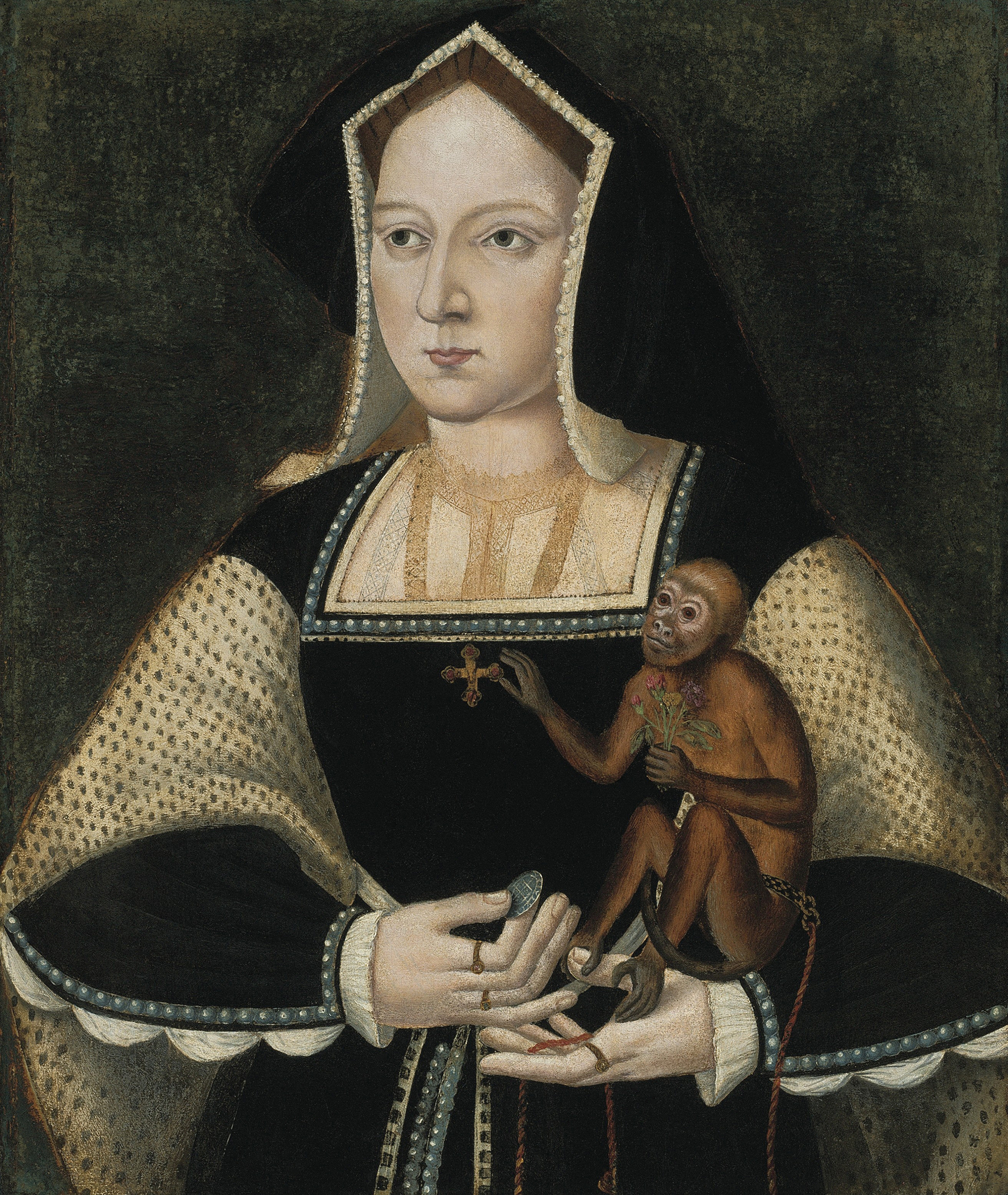
Catherine of Aragon
m. 1509–1533

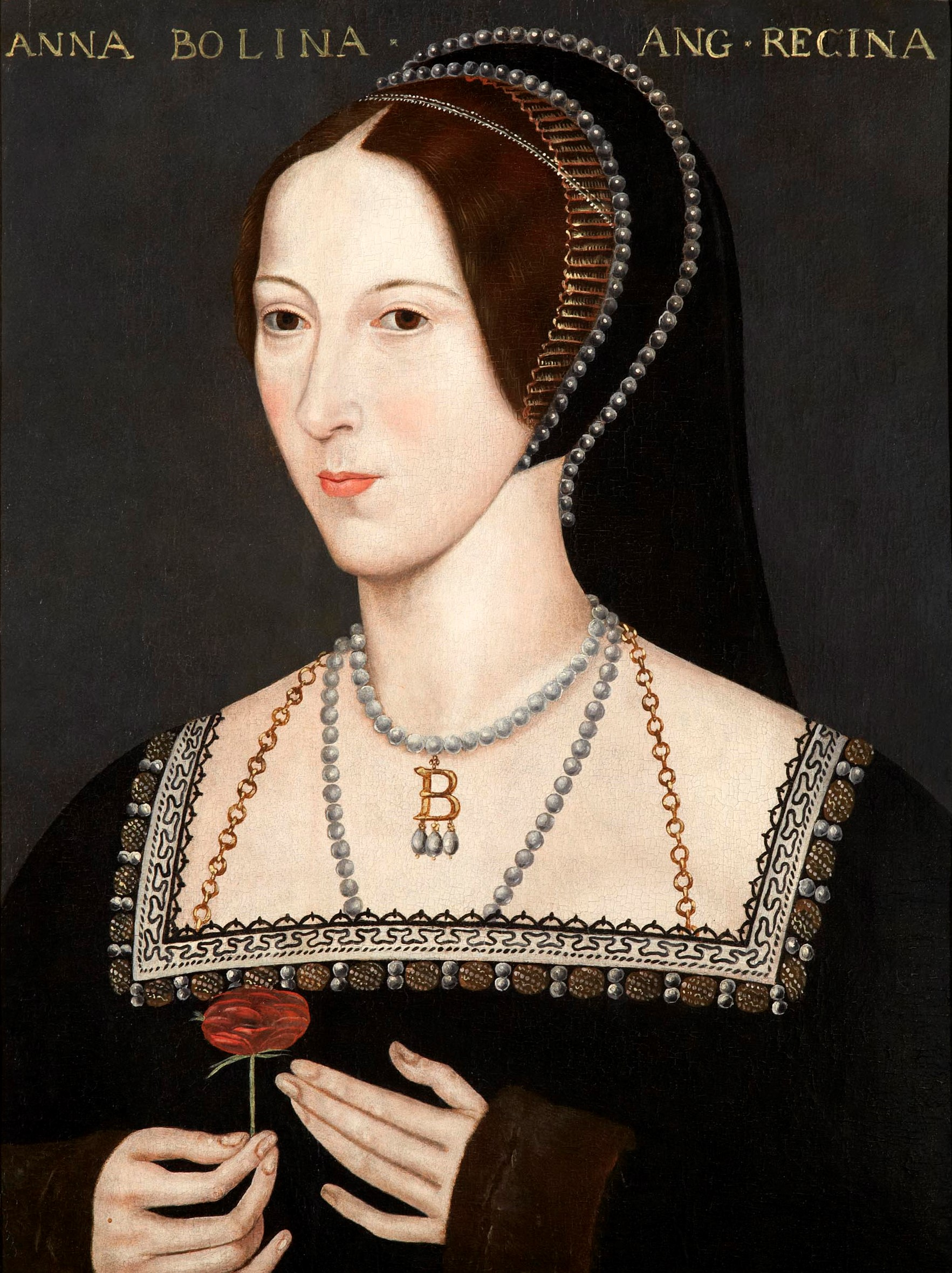
Anne Boleyn
m. 1532/1533–1536

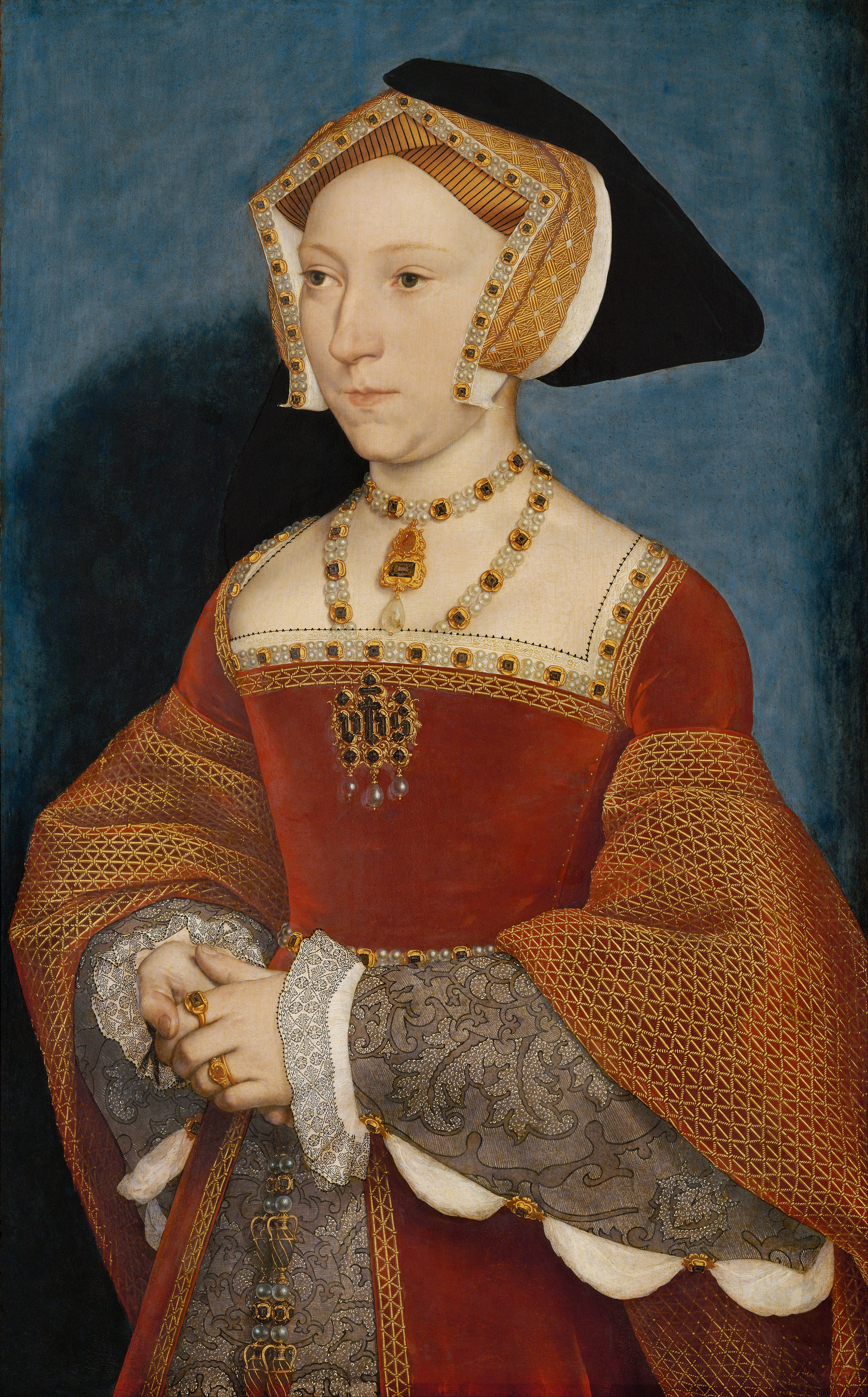
Jane Seymour
m. 1536–1537

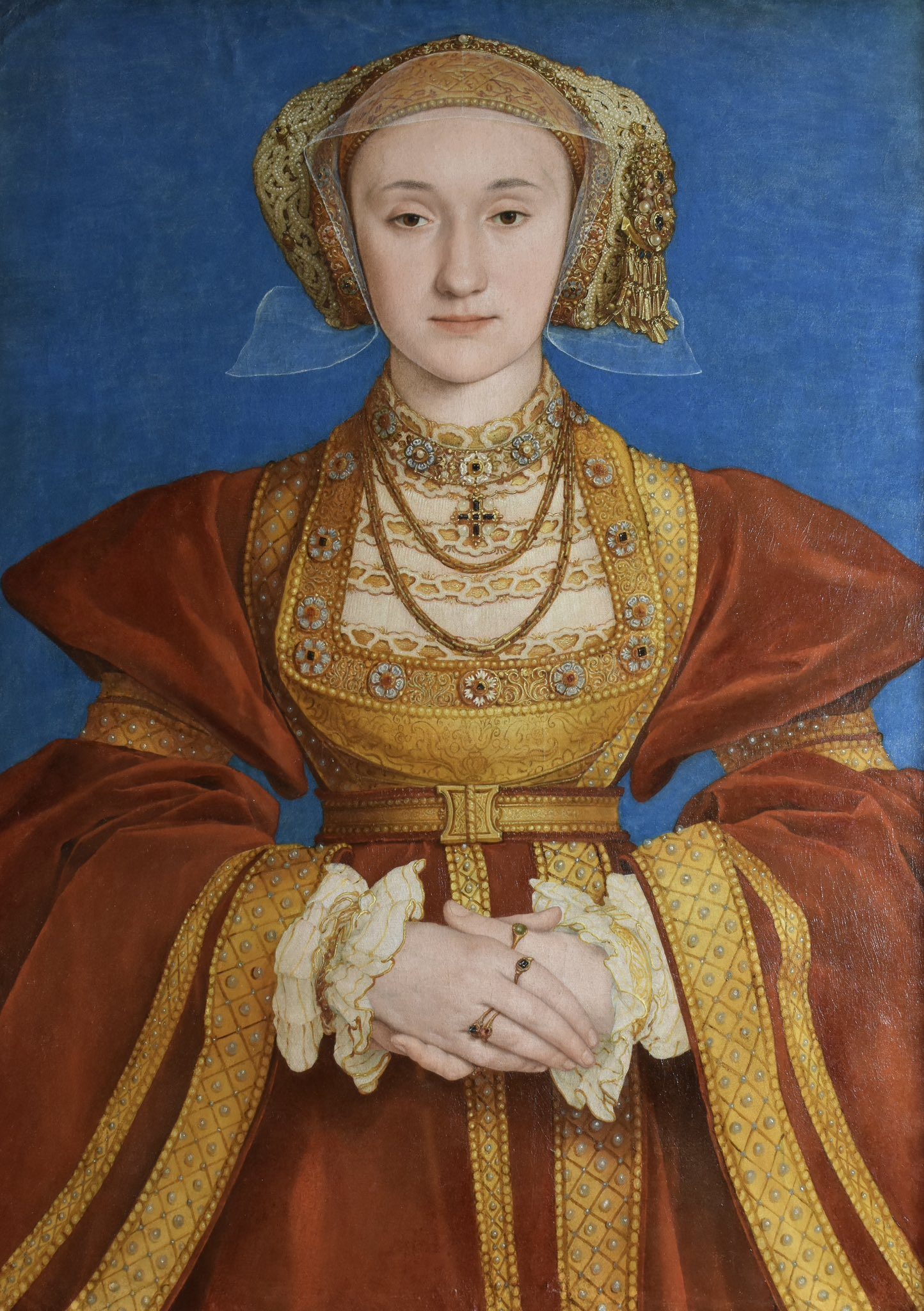
Anne of Cleves
m. 1540

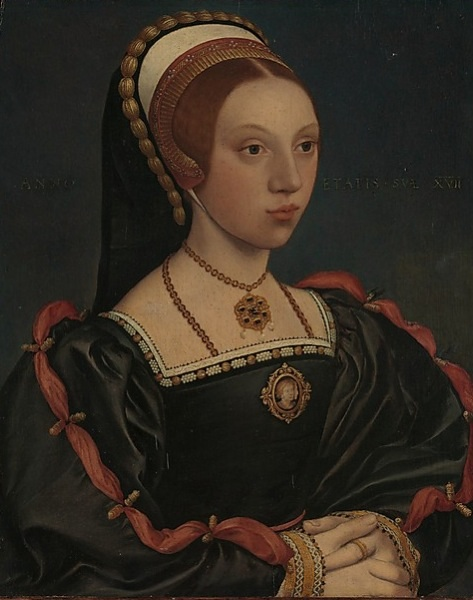
Catherine Howard
m. 1540–1542

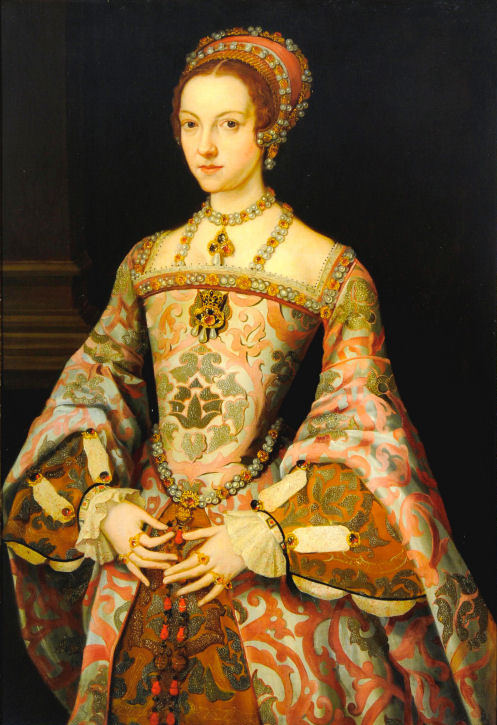
Catherine Parr
m. 1543–1547

[The King] so went up into the chamber where the said Lady Anne was looking out of a window to see the bull-baiting which was going on in the courtyard, and suddenly he embraced and kissed her, and showed her a token which the king had sent her for New Year's gift, and she being abashed and not knowing who it was thanked him, and so he spoke with her. But she regarded him little, but always looked out the window .... and when the king saw that she took so little notice of his coming he went into another chamber and took off his cloak and came in again in a coat of purple velvet. And when the lords and knights saw his grace they did him reverence.

According to the testimony of Henry's companions, he was disappointed with Anne, feeling that she was not as described. Although Anne "regarded him little", it is unknown whether she knew this was the King. Henry then revealed his true identity to Anne, and although he is said to have been put off, the marriage preparations proceeded. Henry and Anne then met officially on 3 January on Blackheath outside the gates of Greenwich Park, where a grand reception was laid out.

Most historians believe that Henry's misgivings about the marriage derived from his assessment that Anne's appearance was unsatisfactory and failure to inspire him to consummate the marriage. He felt that he had been misled by his advisors' praise: "She is nothing so fair as she hath been reported", he complained. He told others in his court that if "it were not that she had come so far into my realm, and the great preparations and state that my people have made for her, and for fear of making a ruffle in the world and of driving her brother into the arms of the Emperor and the French King, I would not now marry her. But now it is too far gone, wherefore I am sorry." (Note: Henry's reported response, likening Anne to a "Flanders mare", has no contemporary source but originates from a "misogynist" coining only in 1679, by Whig historian Gilbert Burnet.)

Cromwell received some blame for the Holbein portrait, which Henry believed not an accurate depiction of Anne, and for some of the exaggerated reports of her beauty. Henry urged Cromwell to find a legal way to avoid the marriage but, by this point, doing so was impossible without endangering the vital alliance with the Germans. In his anger and frustration, the King turned on Cromwell, to his subsequent regret.

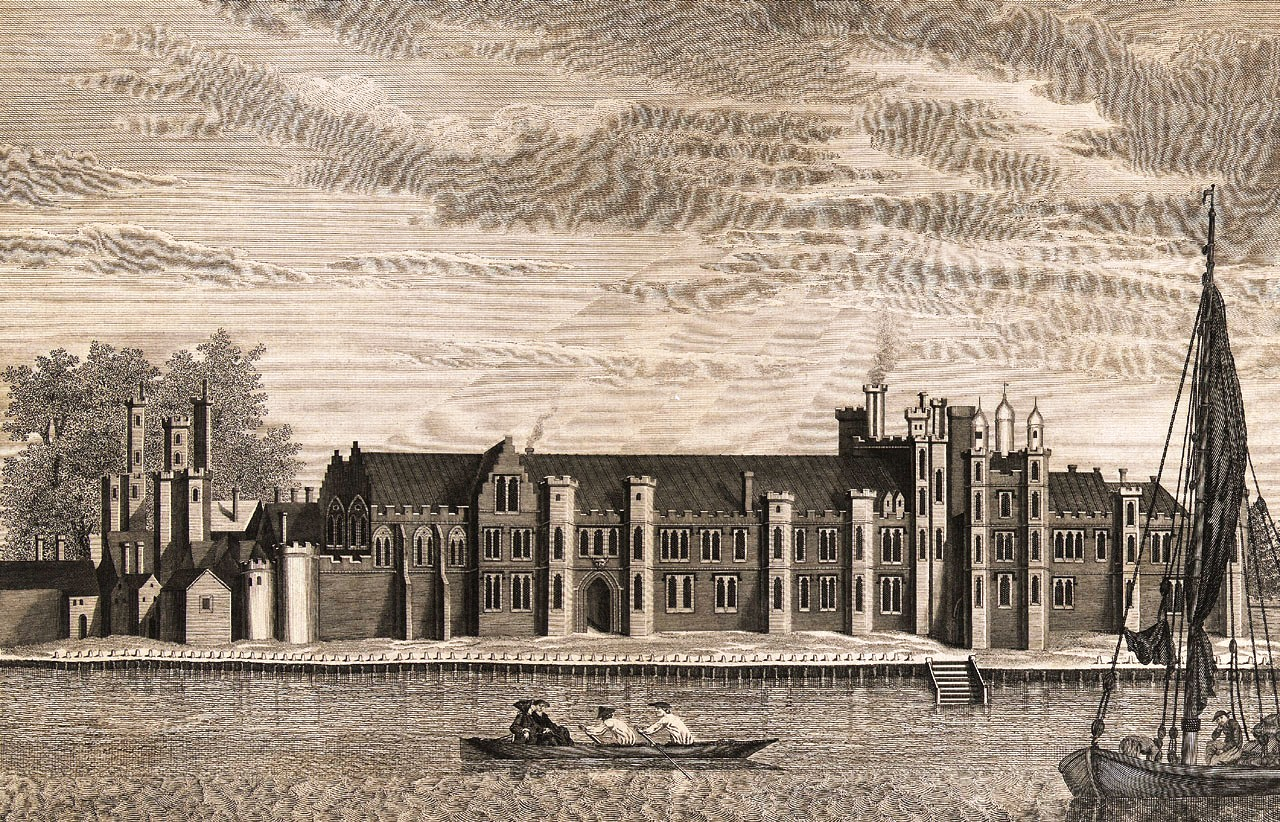
The Palace of Placentia circa 1500s

== Marriage ==
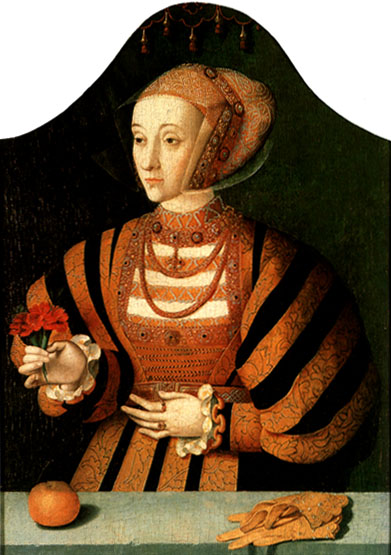
A portrait of Anne in the 1540s by Bartholomäus Bruyn the Elder

Despite Henry's very vocal misgivings, the two were married on 6 January 1540 at the royal Palace of Placentia in Greenwich, London, by Archbishop Thomas Cranmer. The phrase "God send me well to keep" was engraved around Anne's wedding ring. According to Edward Hall, she wore a "gowne of ryche cloth of gold set full of large flowers of great and Orient pearl, made after the Duche fassion rownde". A round gown had no train. On the Sunday after the wedding there were jousts, Anne dressed in the English fashion, with a French hood.

Immediately after arriving in England, Anne conformed to the Catholic form of worship which Henry had retained after his break with Rome. The couple's first night as husband and wife was not a successful one. Henry confided to Cromwell that he had not consummated the marriage, saying, "I liked her before not well, but now I like her much worse".

In February 1540, speaking to the Countess of Rutland, Anne praised the King as a kind husband, saying: "When he comes to bed he kisseth me, and he taketh me by the hand, and biddeth me 'Good night, sweetheart'; and in the morning kisseth me and biddeth 'Farewell, darling.'" Lady Rutland responded: "Madam, there must be more than this, or it will be long ere we have a duke of York, which all this realm most desireth." (Note: According to John Strype (while transcribing from some state papers in 1709) the record of this conversation appears in a signed deposition made by Rutland (and two other Court ladies) in June 1540. Elizabeth Norton, however, dismisses this tale as "suspect", citing the unlikelihood of Anne's mother despatching her to England without some knowledge of the duties of a wife, and Anne's inability to hold any conversation in English.)

Anne was commanded to leave the Court on 24 June, and on 6 July she was informed of her husband's decision to reconsider the marriage. Witness statements were taken from a number of courtiers and two physicians which register the King's disappointment at her appearance. Henry had also commented to Thomas Heneage and Anthony Denny that he could not believe she was a virgin.

Shortly afterwards, Anne was asked for her consent to an annulment, to which she agreed. Cromwell, the moving force behind the marriage, was attainted for treason. The marriage was annulled on 12 July 1540, on the grounds of non-consummation and her pre-contract to Francis of Lorraine. Henry VIII's physician stated that, after the wedding night, Henry said he was not impotent because he experienced "duas pollutiones nocturnas in somno" (two nocturnal pollutions while in sleep).

== After the annulment ==
Anne of Cleves' arms as queen consort

Anne had been given dower lands in January 1540 to fund her household, including manors in Hampshire formerly owned by Breamore Priory and Southwick Priory. Following the annulment she received a generous settlement, including Richmond Palace, and Hever Castle, home of Henry's former in-laws, the Boleyns. Anne of Cleves House, in Lewes, East Sussex, is just one of many properties she owned, though she never lived there. Henry and Anne became friendly—she was an honorary member of the King's family and was referred to as "the King's Beloved Sister". She was invited to court often and, out of gratitude for not contesting the annulment, Henry decreed that she would be given precedence over all women in England save his own wife and daughters.

After Catherine Howard was beheaded in 1542, Anne and her brother William pressed the King to remarry Anne. Henry quickly refused to do so. Anne seems to have disliked Catherine Parr and reportedly reacted to the news of Henry's sixth marriage in 1543 with the remark "Madam Parr is taking a great burden on herself."

In March 1547, Edward VI's Privy Council asked her to move out of Bletchingley Palace, her usual residence, to Penshurst Place to make way for Thomas Cawarden, Master of Revels. They pointed out that Penshurst was nearer to Hever and the move had been Henry VIII's will. On 4 August 1553, Anne wrote to Mary I to congratulate her on her marriage to Philip of Spain. On 28 September 1553, when Mary left St James's Palace for Whitehall, she was accompanied by her sister Elizabeth and Anne of Cleves. Anne also took part in Mary I's coronation procession, and may have been present at her coronation at Westminster Abbey. (Note: According to Antoine de Noailles, Elizabeth and Anne followed Mary into the Abbey) These seem to have been her last public appearances, although there is an account of Anne at Westminster Abbey in August 1554 after the wedding of Mary and Philip. As the new queen was a strict Catholic, Anne yet again changed religion, then becoming a Roman Catholic.

After a brief return to prominence, she lost royal favour in 1554, following Wyatt's rebellion. According to Simon Renard, the Imperial ambassador, Anne's close association with Elizabeth had convinced the Queen that "the Lady [Anne] of Cleves was of the plot and intrigued with the Duke of Cleves to obtain help for Elizabeth: matters in which the king of France was the prime mover". There is no evidence that Anne was invited back to court after 1554. She was compelled to live a quiet and obscure life on her estates. After her arrival as the King's bride, Anne never left England. Despite occasional feelings of homesickness, Anne was generally content in England and was described by Raphael Holinshed as "a ladie of right commendable regards, courteous, gentle, a good housekeeper and verie bountifull to her servants."

In the summer of 1556, Anne's brother William complained about some of her servants. He had heard that Otto Wylick, Jasper Brockhausen, and his wife, Gertrude, made difficulties in Anne's household. Gertrude was said to have beguiled Anne with impostures and incantations. The matter came before Queen Mary and the English council of Philip II, and in September Brockhausen and Wylick were expelled.

== Death ==
When Anne's health began to fail, Mary allowed her to live at Chelsea Old Manor, where Henry's last wife, Catherine Parr, had lived after her remarriage. Here, in the middle of July 1557, Anne dictated her last will. In it, she mentions her brother, sister, and sister-in-law, as well as the future Queen Elizabeth, the Duchess of Suffolk, and the Countess of Arundel. She left some money to her servants and asked Mary and Elizabeth to employ them in their households. She was remembered by everyone who served her as a particularly generous and easy-going mistress.

Anne died at Chelsea Old Manor on 16 July 1557, aged 41 or 42. The most likely cause of her death was cancer. She was buried in Westminster Abbey on 3 August in what has been described as a "somewhat hard-to-find tomb" on the opposite side of Edward the Confessor's shrine and slightly above eye level for a person of average height.

Anne's epitaph in Westminster Abbey, reads simply:

ANNE OF CLEVES
QUEEN OF ENGLAND
BORN 1515 • DIED 1557

She was the last of Henry VIII's wives to die.

== Fictional portrayals ==
The role of Anne of Cleves was played by:

- Elsa Lanchester in The Private Life of Henry VIII, which was released in 1933. Lanchester's husband Charles Laughton played Henry VIII and won an Academy Award for his portrayal.
- Elvi Hale in the episode Anne of Cleves in the 1971 television series The Six Wives of Henry VIII.
- Jenny Bos in the 1972 British film Henry VIII and His Six Wives
- Pia Girard in the 2003 ITV series Henry VIII.
- Joss Stone in the Showtime cable television series The Tudors.
- Rebecca Dyson-Smith in the BBC documentary mini-series Six Wives with Lucy Worsley
- Genesis Lynea originated the role of Cleves in the musical Six.
- Dana Herfurth portrays her in the BBC miniseries Wolf Hall: The Mirror and the Light.

Family tree of the wives of Henry VIII

King Henry VIII, both of his parents, and all six of his wives were related through a common ancestor, King Edward I of England. See also: Mistresses of Henry VIII

Edward I 1239–1307; King of England
Margaret b. 1275; Duchess of Brabant	Elizabeth of Rhuddlan c. 1282–1316; Countess of Hereford	Edward II; 1284–1327; King of England
John III; 1300–1355; Duke of Brabant	William de Bohun; 1312–1360; Earl of Northampton	Edward III; 1312–1377; King of England
Margaret of Brabant; 1323–1380; Countess of Flanders	Lionel of Antwerp; 1338–1368; Duke of Clarence	Edmund of Langley; 1341–1402; Duke of York	John of Gaunt; 1340–1399; Duke of Lancaster
Margaret III; 1350–1405; Countess of Flanders	Elizabeth Fitzalan c. 1350–1385; Countess of Arundel	Philippa; 1355–1382; Countess of Ulster
John; 1371–1419; Duke of Burgundy	Elizabeth Fitzalan; 1366–1425; Duchess of Norfolk	Elizabeth Mortimer; 1371–1417	Roger Mortimer; 1374–1398; Earl of March	John Beaufort c. 1371–1410; Earl of Somerset	Catherine; 1373–1418; Queen of Castile	Joan Beaufort c. 1379–1440; Countess of Westmorland
Mary; 1393–1466; Duchess of Cleves	Margaret de Mowbray b. 1388	Elizabeth c. 1395–1436; Baroness de Clifford	Anne de Mortimer; 1388–c. 1411	Richard of Conisburgh; 1385–1415; Earl of Cambridge	John Beaufort; 1404–1444; Duke of Somerset	John II; 1405–1454; King of Castile	Richard Neville; 1400–1460; Earl of Salisbury
John I 1419–1481; Duke of Cleves	John Howard c. 1425–1485; Duke of Norfolk	Mary Clifford	Richard; 1411–1460; Duke of York	Alice Neville b. c. 1430; Baroness FitzHugh
John II; 1458–1521; Duke of Cleves	Thomas Howard; 1443–1524; Duke of Norfolk	Henry Wentworth c. 1448–1499/1501	Edward IV; 1442–1483; King of England	Margaret Beaufort; 1441/43–1509	Isabella I 1451–1504; Queen of Castile	Elizabeth FitzHugh c. 1455/1465–bef. 1507
John III; 1490–1538/1539; Duke of Cleves	Edmund Howard c. 1478–1539	Elizabeth Boleyn c. 1480–1538; Countess of Wiltshire	Margery Wentworth c. 1478–1550	Elizabeth of York; 1466–1503	Henry VII; 1457–1509; King of England	Thomas Parr c. 1483–1517
Anne of Cleves; 1515–1557; 4th wife: 1540	Catherine Howard c. 1524–1542; 5th wife: 1540–1542	Anne Boleyn c. 1507–1536; 2nd wife: 1533–1536	Jane Seymour c. 1508–1537; 3rd wife: 1536–1537	Henry VIII; 1491–1547; King of England	Catherine of Aragon; 1485–1536; 1st wife: 1509–1533	Catherine Parr; 1512–1548; 6th wife: 1543–1547
Elizabeth I 1533–1603; Queen of England	Edward VI; 1537–1553; King of England	Mary I 1516–1558; Queen of England

== Notes ==
Anne of Cleves House of La Marck Born: 1515 Died: 16 July 1557
English royalty
Vacant Title last held by Jane Seymour	Queen consort of England; Lady of Ireland; 6 January – 12 July 1540	Vacant Title next held by Catherine Howard
