= Maria of Jülich-Berg =

German princess

- Duchess of Jülich-Berg
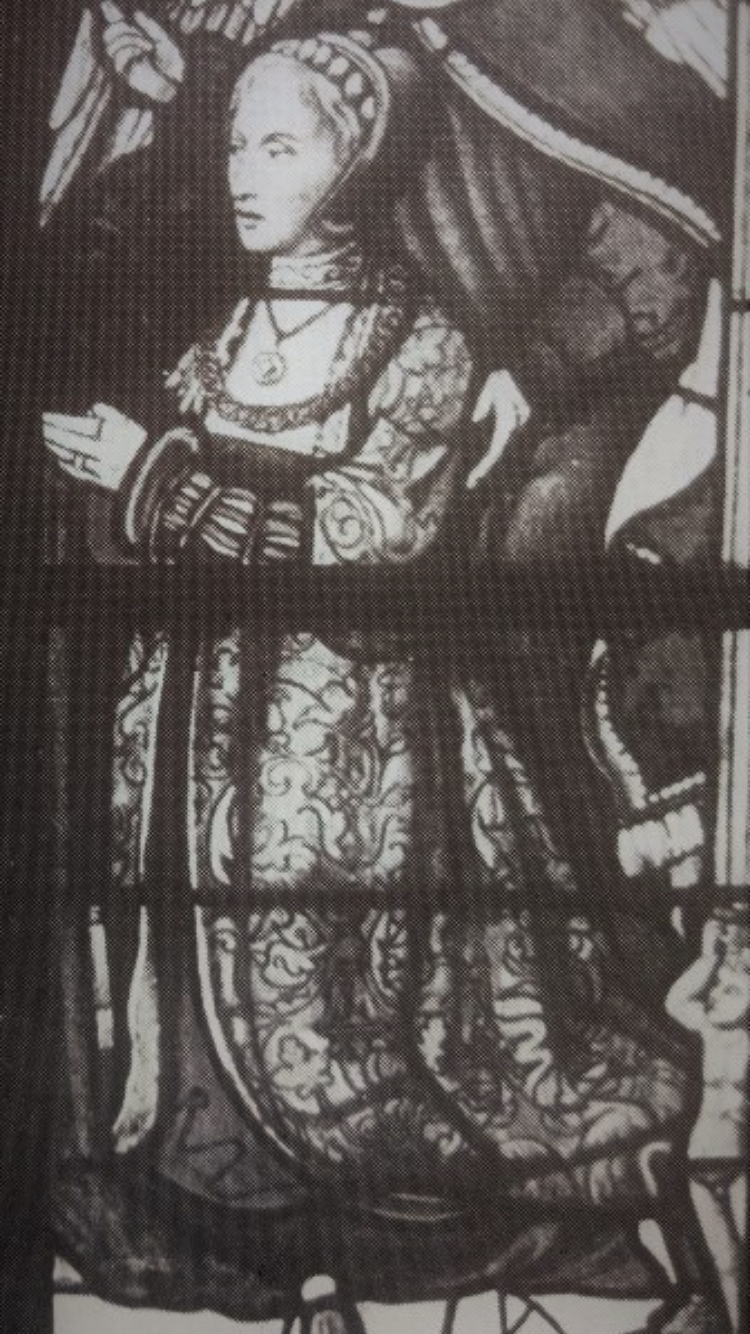
- Stained glass depiction of Maria
- Born: 3 August 1491; Jülich, Kreis Düren, Nordrhein-Westfalen, Germany
- Died: 29 August 1543 (aged 52); Büderich, Kreis Wesel, Nordrhein-Westfalen, Germany
- Noble family: House of Jülich; House of La Marck (by marriage)
- Spouse: John III, Duke of Cleves (m. 1509; died 1539)
- Issue In detail: Sibylle, Electress of Saxony; Anne, Queen of England; William, Duke of Jülich-Cleves-Berg; Amalia, Princess of La Marck
- Father: William IV, Duke of Jülich-Berg
- Mother: Sibylle of Brandenburg

Maria of Jülich-Berg (3 August 1491 – 29 August 1543) was the Duchess of Jülich-Berg, as the daughter of Wilhelm IV, Duke of Jülich-Berg and Sibylle of Brandenburg. She became heiress to her father's estates of Jülich, Berg and Ravensberg after it had become apparent that her parents’ marriage would not produce any more children. In 1509, Maria married John III, Duke of Cleves. Their daughter, Anna, became the fourth consort of King Henry VIII of England.

== Early life ==
Duchess Maria was born on 3 August 1491 in Jülich, Germany, as the only child of Duke Wilhelm IV and Duchess Sibylle, the daughter of Albrecht III Achilles, Elector of Brandenburg, and his wife Anna of Saxony, daughter of the Elector Frederick II of Saxony from his marriage to Margaret of Austria. Maria came from the line of German princesses that stretched back to Sybille of Brandenberg, Sophia of Saxony, and Adelaide of Teck.

In 1496, at the age of 5, Duchess Maria was betrothed to the 6-year-old Duke of Cleves, John.

== Duchess ==
They married in 1509. Maria's estates and titles were then merged with the Duchy of Cleves. The marriage resulted in the Cleves Union, in which the Duchies of Jülich-Berg-Ravensberg and Cleves-Mark were combined to form the United Duchies of Jülich-Cleves-Berg.

When her father died in 1511 Maria, being female, could not inherit, and Jülich-Berg-Ravensberg fell to her husband John III through her. At the request of Maria and John II, who resided in Cleves, Maria's mother Sibylle acted as governor of Jülich-Berg during this period. John, who inherited the Duchy of Cleves-Mark in 1521, then became the first ruler of the United Duchies of Jülich-Cleves-Berg, which would exist until 1666.

Maria was a traditional Catholic who gave her daughters a practical education on how to run a noble household, which was the norm for German noblewomen during the time period. This differed from the education typically given to daughters of the English nobility and gentry. In The Wives of Henry VIII, Antonia Fraser suggests that, following their marriage, one reason Henry VIII disliked her daughter Anne so much was that, unlike his first two wives and many of the court ladies around him, Anne did not possess educational and musical accomplishments and was ill-equipped to function in the contentious English court. Duchess Maria herself appears not to have favored sending her daughter to England. She wrote in a later correspondence she loved her daughter so much that she was 'loath to suffer her to depart her'.

== Death ==
According to Nicholas Wotton, the English diplomat who negotiated the marriage between Maria's daughter Anna and King Henry, Maria died on 29 August 1543, "raging and […] out of her wits", at Düren castle.

== Gallery ==
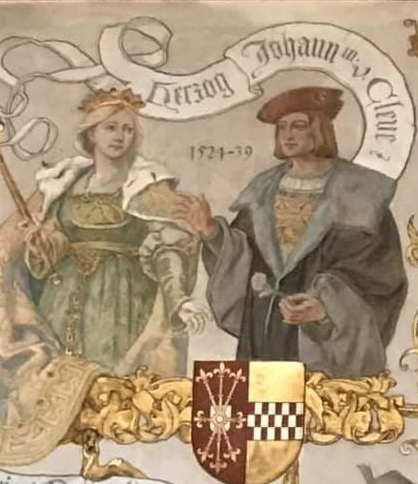
Maria of Jülich-Berg and her husband, John III, Duke of Cleves.

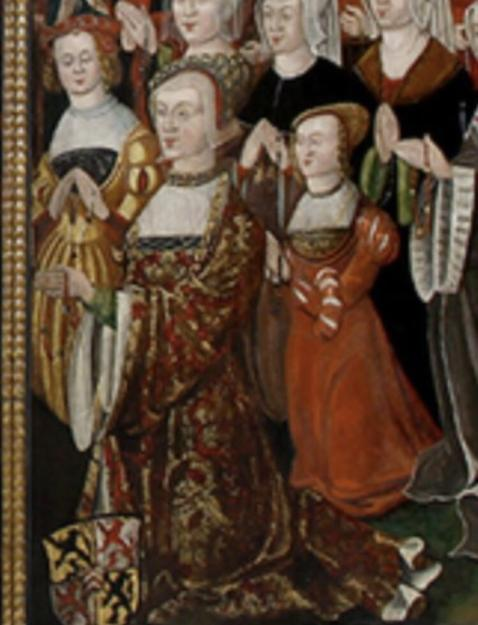
Maria of Jülich-Berg, with her daughters Anne (In yellow), and Amalia (In red).

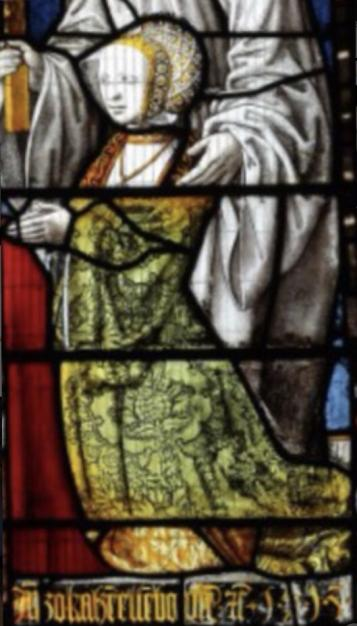
Donor stained glass portrait of Maria of Jülich-Berg at Mariawald Abbey.

== Issue ==
Maria, and her husband John III had three daughters and a son between 1512, and 1517. They were:

Children of Maria of Jülich-Berg

| Name | Portrait | Lifespan | Notes |
|---|---|---|---|
| Sibylle electress consort of Saxony. | | 17 January 1512 –21 February 1554 | Married John Frederick I, Elector of Saxony, the eldest son of Elector John by his first wife, Sophie of Mecklenburg-Schwerin. Had issue. |
| Anne; Queen of England. | | 28 June 1515 –16 July 1557 | Married Henry VIII of England. The marriage wasn't consummated, and was annulled six months later. |
| William; Duke of Jülich-Cleves-Berg. | | 28 July 1516 –5 January 1592 | Married twice; Firstly to Jeanne d'Albret, heiress of Navarre as the daughter of King Henry II of Navarre and his wife Margaret of Valois-Angoulême, but this political marriage was later annulled by papal dispensation on 1545. Secondly to Maria of Austria, daughter of Ferdinand I, Holy Roman Emperor, and Anna of Bohemia and Hungary, and had issue. |
| Amalia princess of the House of La Marck. | | 17 October 1517 –1 March 1586 | Never married, and died without issue. |

== Ancestry ==
Ancestors of Maria of Jülich-Berg

8. William VIII of Jülich, Count of Ravensberg
4. Gerhard VII, Duke of Jülich-Berg
9. Adelheid of Tecklenburg
2. William IV, Duke of Jülich-Berg
10. Bernard II, Duke of Saxe-Lauenburg
5. Sophie of Saxe-Lauenburg
11. Adelheid of Pomerania
1. Maria of Jülich-Berg
12. Frederick I, Elector of Brandenburg
6. Albrecht III Achilles, Elector of Brandenburg
13. Elisabeth of Bavaria-Landshut
3. Sibylle of Brandenburg
14. Frederick II, Elector of Saxony
7. Anna of Saxony
15. Margarete of Austria

== Sources ==
- Bietenholz, Peter G.; Deutscher, Thomas Brian, eds. (2003). Contemporaries of Erasmus: A Biographical Register of the Renaissance and Reformation. Vol. 1–3. University of Toronto Press.
- Darsie, Heather (2019). Anna, Duchess of Cleves: The King's 'Beloved Sister'. Stroud, England: Amberley Publishing. ISBN 9781445677101.
- —— (2023). Children of the House of Cleves Anna and Her Siblings. Stroud: Amberley Publishing. ISBN 9781445699424.
- Morris, Sarah; Grueninger, Natalie (2017). In the Footsteps of the Six Wives of Henry VIII. Amberley Publishing. ISBN 9781445671147.
- Ward, A.W.; Prothero, G.W.; Leathes, Stanley, eds. (1934). The Cambridge Modern History. Vol. XIII. Cambridge at the University Press.
