= Sibylle of Brandenburg =

Duchess of Jülich and Berg

- Donor portrait of Sibylle and her daughter Maria at the Basilica of Sankta Maria in Cologne.
- Born: 31 May 1467; Ansbach, Principality of Ansbach
- Died: 9 July 1524 (aged 57); Kaster, County of Flanders
- Buried: Altenberg Abbey
- Noble family: House of Hohenzollern
- Spouse: William IV, Duke of Jülich-Berg
- Issue: Maria of Jülich-Berg
- Father: Albert III Achilles, Elector of Brandenburg
- Mother: Anna of Saxony

Sibylle of Brandenburg (31 May 1467 in Ansbach – 9 July 1524 in Kaster) was a Princess of Brandenburg by birth and by marriage Duchess of Jülich and Duchess of Berg. She was the governor-regent of Jülich-Berg for her daughter Maria from 1511 to 1524.

== Life ==
Sibylle was a daughter of Elector Albrecht III Achilles of Brandenburg (1414–1486) from his second marriage to Anna (1436–1512), daughter of the Elector Frederick II of Saxony.

She married on 25 July 1481 in Cologne with Duke William IV of Jülich and Berg (1455–1511). The wedding celebration was very expensive. In addition to numerous archbishops, bishops and prelates, the Archduke of Austria, the Duke of Burgundy, the Elector of Brandenburg and the Margrave of Baden, more than 50 counts and countesses were invited and countless other noblemen. Because of the large number of guests, the marriage was concluded in an open field in front of St. Severin gate. The priest was Archbishop Herman of Cologne. Sibylle was supposed to bring a large dowry into the marriage, but William had to write his in-laws several times about delays in its payment.

After ten years their only child was born, a girl named Maria. She married Duke John III of Cleves. They were engaged in 1496, when Maria was five years old and John was six. They married in 1510. This resulted in the so-called Cleves Union in which the Duchies of Jülich-Berg-Ravensberg and Cleves-Mark were combined to form the United Duchies of Jülich-Cleves-Berg. When William died in 1511, Maria, being female, could not inherit and Jülich-Berg-Ravensberg fell to John III.

Sibylle survived her husband by 13 years. At the request of Maria and John II, who resided in Cleves, she acted as governor of Jülich-Berg during this period. Sybille was described as spirited, energetic and wise and an equitable mother for her country.

Sibylle died in 1524 and was buried in Altenberg Abbey.

== Issue ==
From her marriage with William, Sibylle had a daughter:

- Maria (1491–1543), married in 1510 Duke John III of Cleves (1490–1536), who became Duke John I of Jülich-Cleves-Berge. She was the mother of Anne Of Cleves, Queen consort of Henry VIII of England.

== Ancestors ==
Ancestors of Sibylle of Brandenburg

8. Frederick V, Burgrave of Nuremberg
4. Frederick I, Elector of Brandenburg
9. Elisabeth of Meissen
2. Albrecht III, Elector of Brandenburg
10. Frederick, Duke of Bavaria-Landshut
5. Elisabeth of Bavaria-Landshut
11. Maddalena Visconti
1. Sibyllle of Brandenburg
12. Frederick I, Elector of Saxony
6. Frederick II, Elector of Saxony
13. Catherine of Brunswick
3. Anna of Saxony
14. Ernest, Duke of Austria
7. Margarete of Austria-Styria
15. Cymburgis of Masovia

== References and sources ==
- Julius von Minutoli: Das kaiserliche Buch des Markgrafen Albrecht Achilles, Schneider, 1850, p. 492
- Hermann von Scharff-Scharffenstein: Denkwürdigkeiten eines Royalisten, F. A. Herbig, 1859, p. 221 ff.
