= Sophie of Saxe-Lauenburg =

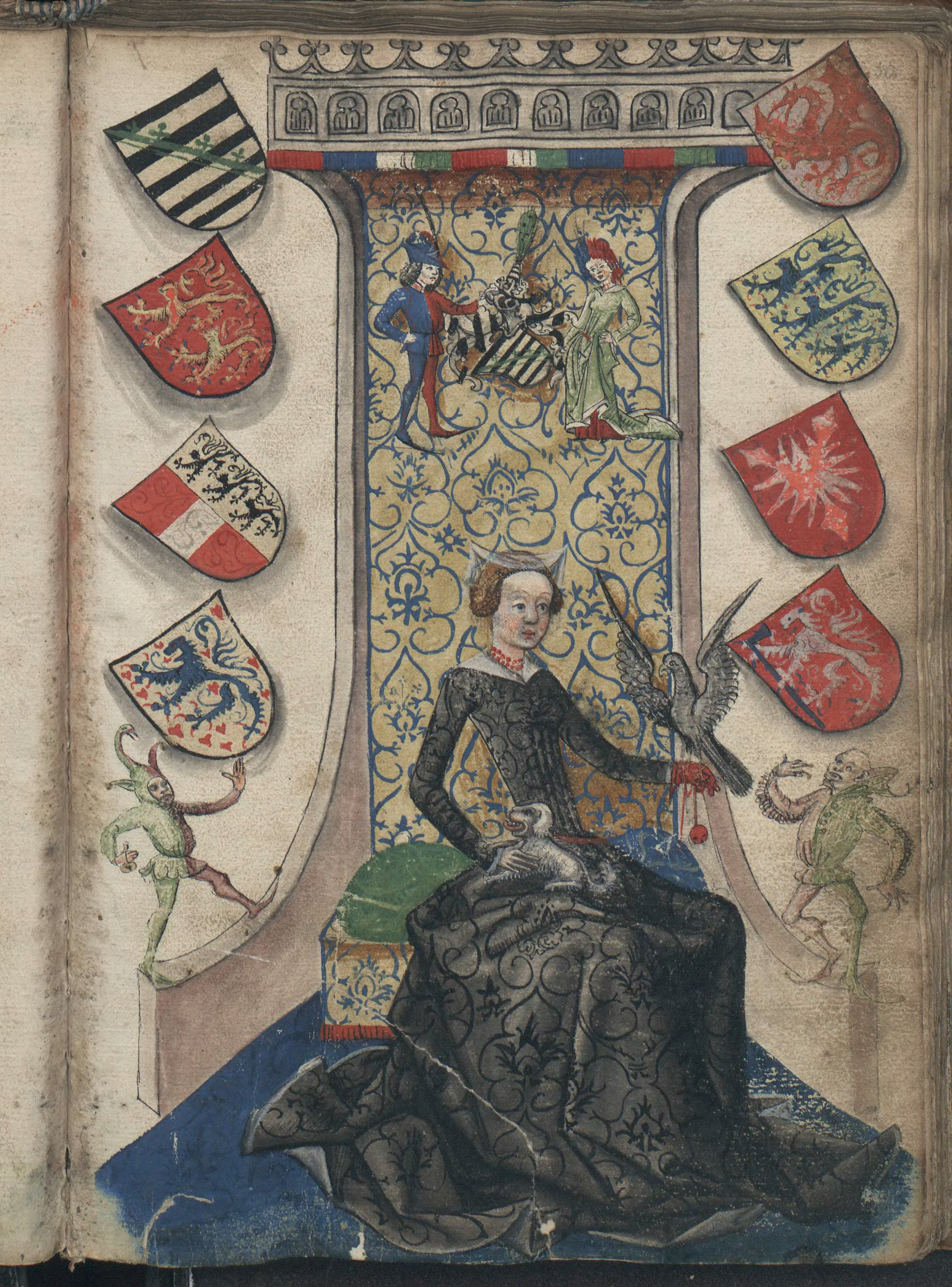
- Born: 1428
- Died: 9 September 1473
- Noble family: House of Ascania
- Spouse: Gerhard VII, Duke of Jülich-Berg
- Father: Bernard II, Duke of Saxe-Lauenburg
- Mother: Adelheid of Pomerania

Sophie of Saxe-Lauenburg (1428 – 9 September 1473) was a German regent, Duchess of Jülich-Berg by marriage to Gerhard VIII of Jülich-Berg. She was regent of Jülich, Berg and Ravensberg during the incapacity of her spouse and the minority of her eldest son William IV from 1456 until 1473.

== Life ==
Sophie was the daughter of Duke Bernard II of Saxe-Lauenburg († 1463) from his marriage to Adelheid (who died after 1445), a daughter the Duke Bogislaw VIII of Pomerania.

In 1444, she married Duke Gerhard VIII of Jülich-Berg, Count of Ravensberg (born: 1416 or 1417; died: 1475).

=== Regency ===
In approximately 1456, Gerhard lapsed into insanity and was incapable of ruling. Sophie took over the reins of government in the Duchy as regent, since her firstborn son, who would otherwise have been considered for the regency, was himself a minor.

In 1470, she was libelled by Frederick of Sombreff. Her sons responded by besieging his Tomburg Castle and setting it on fire. Sophie later rebuilt the castle.

== Issue ==
Sophie from her marriage had the following children:

- William IV (1455–1511), Duke of Jülich-Berg
- Anna, married Count Johann of Moers and Saarwerden (died in 1507)
- Adolph (1458–1470)
- Gerhard (died young)
