= William IV of Jülich-Berg =

Duke of Jülich and Berg, Count of Ravensberg (1475–1511)

William IV, Duke of Jülich-Berg
- Donor portrait of William IV of Jülich-Berg at the Basilica of Sankta Maria in Cologne.
- Born: 9 January 1455
- Died: 6 September 1511 (aged 56)
- Noble family: House of Jülich-Heimbach
- Spouses: Elisabeth of Nassau-Saarbrücken; Sibylle of Brandenburg
- Issue: Maria of Jülich-Berg
- Father: Gerhard VII, Duke of Jülich-Berg
- Mother: Sophie of Saxe-Lauenburg

William IV of Jülich-Berg (9 January 1455 – 6 September 1511) was the last ruler of the Duchy of Jülich-Berg.

== Life ==
William was the son of Gerhard VII, Duke of Jülich-Berg and Sophie of Saxe-Lauenburg. When his father died in 1475, William became Duke of Jülich-Berg.

He married the rich Countess Elisabeth of Nassau-Saarbrücken in 1472, but she died in 1479. In 1481, William remarried with Sibylle of Brandenburg, daughter of Albert III Achilles, Elector of Brandenburg. Neither marriage produced a son, so the succession of the Duchy became a problem.

William then concluded in 1496 the Klever Union with John II, Duke of Cleves, in which the union of the Duchy of Jülich-Berg and the Duchy of Cleves-Mark was planned. William had only one five-year-old daughter, Maria, who was promised in marriage to John II's six-year-old son John III. They married in 1509.

William died in 1511, leaving his daughter the final member of the House of Jülich. He is buried in Altenberg Abbey. He was succeeded by his son-in-law, who inherited the Duchy of Cleves-Mark in 1521. John III then became the first ruler of the United Duchies of Jülich-Cleves-Berg, which would exist until 1666.

== Ancestors ==
Ancestors of William IV of Jülich-Berg

8. William VII of Jülich, 1st Duke of Berg
4. William VIII of Jülich, Count of Ravensberg
9. Anna of the Palatinate
2. Gerhard VII, Duke of Jülich-Berg
10. Nicholas II, Count of Tecklenburg
5. Adelheid of Tecklenburg
11. Anna Elisabeth of Moers
1. William IV, Duke of Jülich-Berg
12. Eric IV, Duke of Saxe-Lauenburg
6. Bernard II, Duke of Saxe-Lauenburg
13. Sophia of Brunswick-Lüneburg
3. Sophie of Saxe-Lauenburg
14. Bogislaw VIII, Duke of Pomerania
7. Adelheid of Pomerania
15. Sophia of Holstein-Rendsburg

William IV of Jülich-Berg House of Jülich-Heimbach Born: 9 January 1455 Died: 6 September 1511
Preceded by Gerhard VII	Duke of Jülich-Berg; Count of Ravensberg; 1475–1511	Succeeded by John III as Duke of Jülich-Cleves-Berg
