= John III of Cleves =

First ruler of the United Duchies of Jülich-Cleves-Berg

John III
- Duke of Cleves; Count of Mark
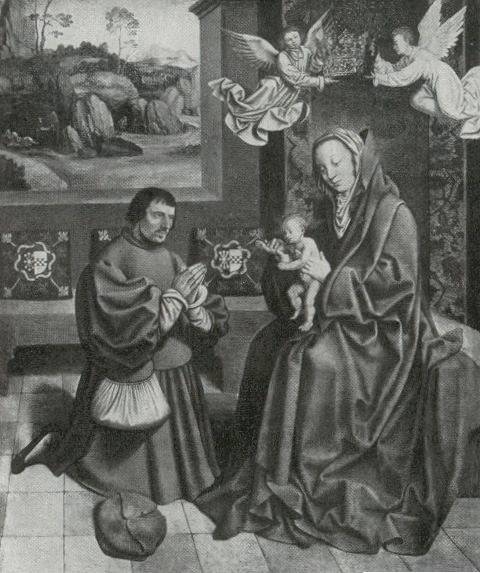
- John depicted in Johann III with the Virgin and Child
- Born: 10 November 1490; Deggendorf, Germany
- Died: 6 February 1539 (aged 48)
- Noble family: La Marck
- Spouse: Maria of Jülich-Berg (m. 1509)
- Issue Detail: Sibylle, Electress of Saxony; Anne, Queen of England; William, Duke of Jülich-Cleves-Berg; Amalia, Princess of La Marck
- Father: John II, Duke of Cleves
- Mother: Mathilde of Hesse

John III, Duke of Cleves and Count of Mark (German: Johann III der Friedfertige; 10 November 1490 – 6 February 1539), known as John the Peaceful, was the Lord of Ravensberg, Count of Mark, and founder of the United Duchies of Jülich-Cleves-Berg.

== Life ==
John was born on 10 November 1490, as the son of John II, Duke of Cleves, and Mathilde of Hesse. In 1510, at the age of 19, John married Duchess Maria of Jülich-Berg, daughter of Duke William IV of Jülich-Berg and Sibylle of Brandenburg, who became heiress to her father's estates Jülich, Berg and Ravensberg.

John became ruler of the United Duchies of Jülich-Cleves-Berg in 1521, and Lord of Ravensberg in 1528. John represented a compensatory attitude, which strove for a via media between the two confessions during the Protestant Reformation. In fact, the real influence at the court of Cleves was Erasmus. Many of his men were friends and followers of the Dutch scholar and theologian. In 1532 John wrote up a list of church regulations (Kirchenordnung), which expressed numerous ideas of Erasmus.

John had an instinct for balance as was shown when he married his eldest daughter Sybille to the elector of Saxony, John Frederick. John Frederick would go on to later head the Schmalkaldic League. In many ways, John of Cleves' court was ideal for raising a queen. It was fundamentally liberal, but serious-minded, theologically inclined, and profoundly Erasmian. It was from this court that his daughter Anne would be raised. Anne became the fourth wife of King Henry VIII of England.

== Family ==
Coat-of-arms of
La Marck

Coat-of-arms of
Cleves

John and his wife Duchess Maria of Jülich-Berg had the following children:

1. Sibylle of Cleves (17 January 1512 – 21 February 1554); married Elector John Frederick of Saxony, head of the Protestant Confederation of Germany, "Champion of the Reformation". Had issue.
2. Anne (22 September 1515 – 16 July 1557); who was briefly married to King Henry VIII of England, as his fourth wife. No issue. The marriage was annulled on 12 July 1540, on the grounds of non-consummation and her pre-contract to Francis of Lorraine.
3. William (28 July 1516 – 5 January 1592); married Archduchess Maria, daughter of Emperor Ferdinand I, and had issue.
4. Amalia (17 October 1517 – 1 March 1586); became Princess of the House of La Marck.

John also had with an unknown woman;

Elisabeth of Cleves (b.?- 15 July 1554) Married Gottfried von Bemmel, bailiff of Kervendonk and had issue.

Daughter (?- ? ) Became a nun.

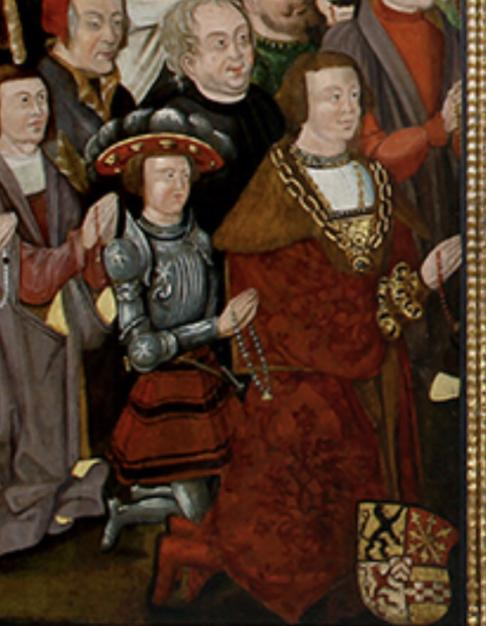
John III, Duke of Cleves, and his only son William.

== Sources ==
- Erasmus, Desiderius (2020). Estes, James M. (ed.). The Correspondence of Erasmus: Letters 2803 to 2939. Vol. 20. Translated by Miller, Clarence. University of Toronto Press.
- Fraser, Antonia (1992). The Wives of Henry VIII. Alfred A. Knopf, Inc.
- Haude, Sigrun (2000). In the Shadow of "Savage Wolves": Anabaptist Münster and the German Reformation During the 1530s. Brill.
- Morby, John (1989). Dynasties of the World: A chronological and genealogical handbook. Oxford University Press.
- Schutte, Valerie (2022). "Anne of Cleves: Survivor Queen". In Norrie, Aidan; Harris, Carolyn; Laynesmith, J. L.; Messer, Danna R.; Woodacre, Elena (eds.). Tudor and Stuart Consorts: Power, Influence, and Dynasty. Palgrave Macmillan. pp. 101–118.
- Tracy, James D. (1972). Erasmus, the Growth of a Mind. Librairie Droz.
- Ward, A.W.; Prothero, G.W.; Leathes, Stanley, eds. (1934). The Cambridge Modern History. Vol. XIII. Cambridge at the University Press.

John III of Cleves House of La Marck Born: 10 November 1490 Died: 6 February 1539
Preceded by William IV	Duke of Jülich-Berg; Count of Ravensberg; 1511–1539	Succeeded by William the Rich
Preceded by John II	Duke of Cleves; Count of Mark; 1521–1539	Succeeded by William the Rich
