= William, Duke of Jülich-Cleves-Berg =

Duke of Jülich-Cleves-Berg from 1539 to 1592

William the Rich
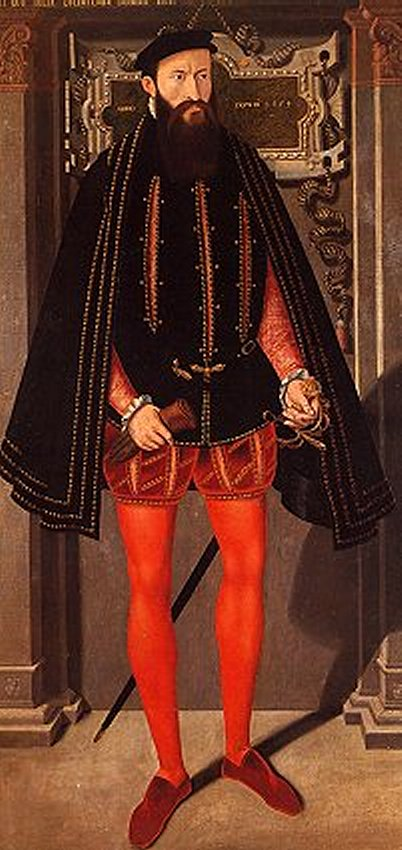
- Portrait William the Rich, Duke of Jülich-Cleves-Berg (circa 1554) by an unidentified painter (Dutch school)

Duke of Jülich-Cleves-Berg
- Reign: 6 February 1539 – 5 January 1592
- Predecessor: John III
- Successor: Johann Wilhelm

Duke of Guelders; Count of Zutphen
- Reign: 30 June 1538 - 7 September 1543
- Predecessor: Charles II
- Successor: Charles III
- Born: 28 July 1516; Düsseldorf, Duchy of Berg
- Died: 5 January 1592 (aged 75); Düsseldorf, Duchy of Berg
- Burial: Collegiate Church of St. Lambertus, Düsseldorf
- Spouses: Jeanne d'Albret (m. 1541; ann. 1545) Archduchess Maria of Austria (m. 1546; died 1581)
- Issue: Marie Eleonore, Duchess of Prussia; Anna, Countess Palatine of Neuburg; Magdalene, Countess Palatine of Zweibrücken; Karl Friedrich of Jülich-Cleves-Berg; Sibylle, Margravine of Burgau; Johann Wilhelm, Duke of Jülich-Cleves-Berg
- House: La Marck
- Father: John III, Duke of Cleves
- Mother: Maria, Duchess of Jülich-Berg

William of Jülich-Cleves-Berg (William I of Cleves, William V of Jülich-Berg), known as William the Rich (German: Wilhelm der Reiche; 28 July 1516 – 5 January 1592), was a Duke of Jülich-Cleves-Berg (1539–1592).

William was born in and died in Düsseldorf. He was the only son of John III, Duke of Jülich-Cleves-Berg, and Maria, Duchess of Jülich-Berg. William took over rule of his father's estates (the Duchy of Cleves and the County of Mark) upon his death in 1539. Despite his mother having lived until 1543, William also became the Duke of Berg and Jülich and the Count of Ravensberg.

== Life ==
William's humanistic education was headed by Konrad Heresbach. William in turn built a humanistic gymnasium in Dusseldorf in 1545. He attempted to uphold the Erasmian church, but did little to stop Lutheranism from spreading through the populace. After 1554, William appointed a Lutheran preacher to educate his sons.

From 1538 to 1543, William held the neighbouring Duchy of Guelders, as successor of his distant relatives, the Egmond dukes. Emperor Charles V claimed this duchy for himself as the dukes had sold their right of heritage, and William tried to hold on to it. He made a treaty with the King of France and married Jeanne d'Albret, and with this backup dared to challenge the Emperor. All too soon he learned that the French did not lift a finger to help him, and he was overwhelmed and had to surrender. In accordance with the Treaty of Venlo (1543) that was the result of this war, Guelders and the County of Zutphen were transferred to Charles V, Holy Roman Emperor, combining them with the Habsburg Netherlands.

William then tried to strengthen his inherited territories and launched an impressive development project for the most important cities. The three duchies all got new main fortresses as major strongpoints, for the older medieval fortifications had proved to be no match against the Imperial artillery. The cities of Jülich, Düsseldorf and Orsoy became fortresses for the duchies of Jülich, Berg and Cleves respectively, and Jülich and Düsseldorf were turned into impressive residences. For this task, the renowned Italian architect Alessandro Pasqualini from Bologna was hired, who had already made some impressive display of his craft in the Netherlands. He made the plans for the fortifications and palaces, of which some traces still remain, especially at Jülich where the citadel (built 1548–1580) is a major landmark, with parts of the Renaissance palace still standing.

William's sister Anne of Cleves was, for six months, the fourth wife of King Henry VIII of England.

== Marriages and descendants ==
William married Jeanne d'Albret (1528–1572), heiress of Navarre as the daughter of King Henry II of Navarre and his wife Margaret of Valois-Angoulême, on 14 June 1541 when she was just 12 years old, but this political marriage was later annulled by papal dispensation on 12 October 1545.

William married Maria of Austria (1531–1581), daughter of Ferdinand I, Holy Roman Emperor, and Anna of Bohemia and Hungary, on 18 July 1546

They had the following children:

1. Marie Eleonore (25 June 1550 – 1608), married Albert Frederick, Duke of Prussia.
2. Anna (1 March 1552 – 1632), married Philipp Ludwig, Count Palatine of Neuburg.
3. Magdalene (1553–1633), married John I, Count Palatine of Zweibrücken (brother of Philip Louis)
4. Karl Friedrich (1555–1575), Hereditary Prince; he died 20 years old.
5. Elizabeth (1556–1561)
6. Sibylle (1557–1627), married Charles, Margrave of Burgau, a morganatic son of Ferdinand II, Archduke of Austria and Philippine Welser
7. Johann Wilhelm (28 May 1562 – 25 March 1609), Bishop of Münster, Duke of Jülich-Cleves-Berg, Count de la Marck, Count of Ravensberg, Lord of Ravenstein. He was first married in 1585 to Jakobea of Baden (died 1597), daughter of Philibert, Margrave of Baden-Baden. He was secondly married to Antonia of Lorraine (died 1610) daughter of Charles III, Duke of Lorraine.

== Sources ==
- Bietenholz, Peter G.; Deutscher, Thomas Brian, eds. (2003). Contemporaries of Erasmus: A Biographical Register of the Renaissance and Reformation. Vol. 1–3. University of Toronto Press.
- Ward, A.W. (1905). "The Empire under Rudolf II". In Ward, A.W.; Prothero, G.W.; Leathes, Stanley (eds.). The Cambridge Modern History. Vol. III. Cambridge at the University Press.
- Ward, A.W.; Prothero, G.W.; Leathes, Stanley, eds. (1934). The Cambridge Modern History. Vol. XIII. Cambridge at the University Press.

William, Duke of Jülich-Cleves-Berg House of La Marck Born: 28 July 1516 Died: 5 January 1592
Preceded by Charles II	Duke of Guelders; Count of Zutphen; 1538–1543	Succeeded by Charles III
Preceded by John III	Duke of Cleves, Jülich and Berg; Count of Mark and Ravensberg; 1539–1592	Succeeded by John William
