= Maria of Austria, Duchess of Jülich-Cleves-Berg =

Maria of Austria
- Duchess of Jülich-Cleves-Berg
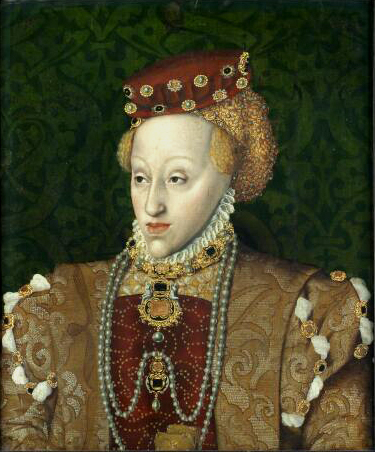
- Portrait by Hans Besser, c. 1555
- Born: 15 May 1531; Prague, Kingdom of Bohemia, Holy Roman Empire
- Died: 11 December 1581 (aged 50); Hambach Castle, Niederzier, Duchy of Jülich, Holy Roman Empire
- Spouse: William, Duke of Jülich-Cleves-Berg (m. 1546)
- Issue: Marie Eleonore, Duchess of Prussia; Anna, Countess Palatine of Neuburg; Magdalene, Countess Palatine of Zweibrücken; Karl Friedrich of Jülich-Cleves-Berg; Sibylle, Margravine of Burgau; Johann Wilhelm, Duke of Jülich-Cleves-Berg
- House: Habsburg
- Father: Ferdinand I, Holy Roman Emperor
- Mother: Anna of Bohemia and Hungary

Archduchess Maria of Austria (15 May 1531 – 11 December 1581) was the daughter of Ferdinand I, Holy Roman Emperor from the House of Habsburg and Anna of Bohemia and Hungary.

== Early life ==
Maria was born on the 15 May 1531 in Prague and grew up in Hofburg. She was described as "small" for her age as well as "almost intelligent", well-mannered and attractive, despite having inherited the facial features characteristic of the Habsburgs.

Maria and her sisters received a strict and thorough Catholic religious education from the humanist Kaspar Ursinus Velius. She was taught German, Italian, Latin and French. She was also taught how to play keyboard instruments and dance.

== Marriage ==
As part of the Treaty of Venlo, William of Jülich-Cleves-Berg was proposed a marriage to one of Emperor Charles V's nieces, with William being allowed to pick between Maria and her sister, Anna.

In June 1546 Maria, along with her mother and her sister, arrived in Regensburg for the marriage negotiations and to meet William. While William initially chose Maria's sister, Anna, she was instead married to Albrecht V of Bavaria, and on 18 July 1546, Maria married William in a lavish ceremony with festivities lasting for days.

=== Life in Düsseldorf ===
Information about Maria's life after marriage at the court of Jülich is very scarce. Some sources suggest that the princess had little mental capacity. Letters from her husband from bear witness to the tender relationship between the two, as well as Maria's supposed mental or physical infirmity. According to a diplomat who visited the court of William the following year, Maria had doubts about the legality of her own marriage due to her husband's forceful union with Jeanne d'Albret, which made her mentally disturbed at the time.

The mental illness of her son Johann Wilhelm, born in 1562, was possibly inherited from his mother. The theory that the princess was sickly and therefore not a part of court life as well as the fact that she gave birth to six children in eight years might have taxed her already frail health and psyche and pushed her into mental confusion. Her paternal grandmother was Joanna of Castile and much like her grandmother, she was regarded as moody and was at first temporarily and later entirely insane.

== Death ==
Maria died after being ill for eight days on the 11 December at Hambach castle. She was attended by her husband and daughter Sibylle.

== Issue ==
Maria had 7 children with William:

1. Marie Eleonore (1550–1608); married Albert Frederick, Duke of Prussia
2. Anna (1552–1632); married Philip Louis, Count Palatine of Neuburg
3. Magdalene (1553–1633); married John I, Count Palatine of Zweibrücken, brother of Philip Louis, Count Palatine of Neuburg
4. Charles Frederick (1555–1575)
5. Elizabeth (1556–1561)
6. Sibylle (1557–1627); married Karl II Habsburg (1560–1618) of Austria, Margrave of Burgau, a morganatic son of Ferdinand II, Archduke of Austria
7. John William (1562–1609), Bishop of Münster, Count of Altena, Duke of Jülich-Cleves-Berg; married firstly, in 1585, to Jakobea of Baden (1558–1597), daughter of Philibert, Margrave of Baden-Baden; married secondly, in 1599, to Antonia of Lorraine (1568–1610), daughter of Charles III, Duke of Lorraine)
