= House of Wassenberg =

of Wassenberg of Guelders of Cleves of Heinsberg of Falkenburg
- Noble family
- Coat of Arms
- Country: Netherlands; Belgium; Germany
- Founded: 11th century
- Founder: Gerard I Flamens and Rutger I, brothers
- Final ruler: Agnes, Lady of Heinsberg (in Heinsberg); John, Lord of Falkenburg (in Falkenburg); John, Count of Cleves (in Cleves); Matilda and Maria of Guelders (in Guelders)
- Estates: County of Guelders; Duchy of Guelders; County of Cleves; Lordship of Heinsberg; Land of Falkenburg
- Dissolution: 1267 (in Heinsberg); 1352 (in Falkenburg); 1368 (in Cleves); 1371 (in Guelders)
- Cadet branches: House of Cleves; House of Heinsberg; House of Falkenburg

The House of Wassenberg (Huis van Wassenberg), was a noble family, active in the area covering parts of the Netherlands and Germany, active from 1021 until 1371. Residing initially at Wassenberg, they expanded rapidly into larger areas, and grew through marriage.

== Origins ==
The first recorded members of the family are two brothers, Gerard I Flamens and Rutger, sometimes called Rutger von Antoing.The first held the main town of Wassenberg, and the other established himself at Kleve in the medieval Hettergau. Rutger or one of his close descendants was already elevated to countship in second half of the 11th century. Despite that, 1092 is still the most commonly used date to refer to a ruler of Cleves.

Coat of arms of the County of Guelders.

Coat of arms of the Duchy of Guelders.

Coat of arms of the County of Cleves.

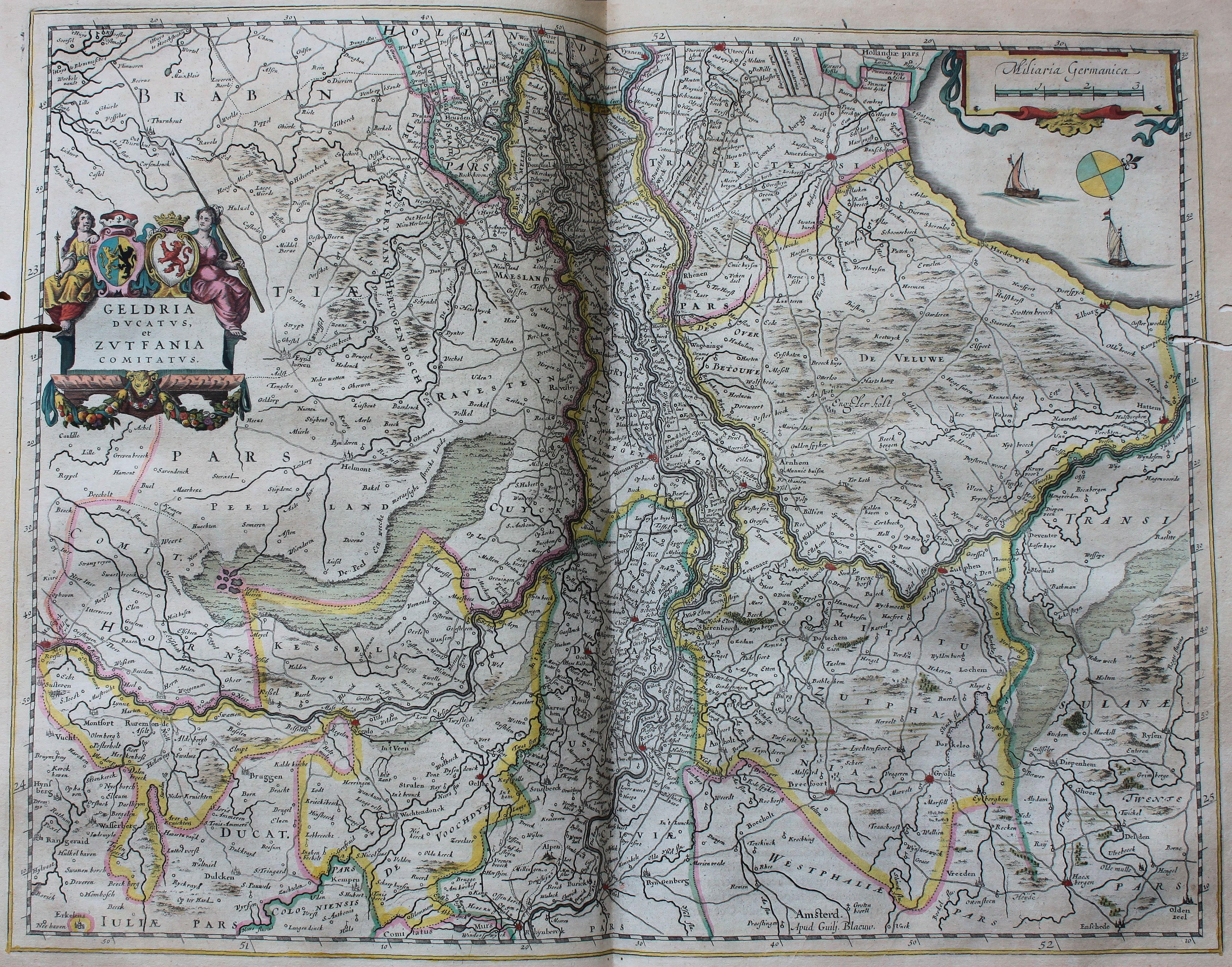
17th-century map showing the Duchy of Guelders and the County of Zutphen.

In 1096, Gerard IV, Lord of Wassenberg, ascended as Gerard I, Count of Guelders. His successor, Gerard II, married Ermengarde, heiress of the Count of Zutphen. By that time, Guelders and Zutphen controlled two different parts of the region of Hamaland, which were joined through this marriage.

In the 12th and 13th centuries, Guelders quickly expanded downstream along the sides of the Meuse, Rhine, and IJssel rivers and even claimed the succession in the Duchy of Limburg, until it lost the 1288 Battle of Worringen against Berg and Brabant.

In 1129, the first settlement of the family at Wassenberg had been given, through marriage, to the Dukes of Limburg, which the Guelders family tried to recover through marriage with Ermengard, heiress of Limburg. However, following the War of the Limburg Succession, Limburg ended up annexed to the Duchy of Brabant. Cleves also participated in this conflict, and helped weaken the powerful Electorate of Cologne.

Relations between the two main branches continued, as in 1355 Guelders gave Zevenaar to the county of Cleves.

In 1339, Reginald II of Guelders was raised to ducal status. But the raise only meant more conflict: the sons of Reginald II confronted each other: the elder son Reginald was imprisoned by he younger one, Edward. As both died without male succession, in 1371 Edward's daughters warred each other for the possession of the duchy. The House of Jülich, through Maria of Guelders, eventually won the dispute.

Even the Cleves branch wasn't meant to last too much long. Upon the death of John of Cleves in 1368, the fief was inherited by his nephew Adolf III of the Marck. Cleves and the Marck were then ruled in personal union by the House of La Marck after Adolf's elder brother Engelbert had died without issue in 1391.

=== Heinsberg and Falkenburg branches ===
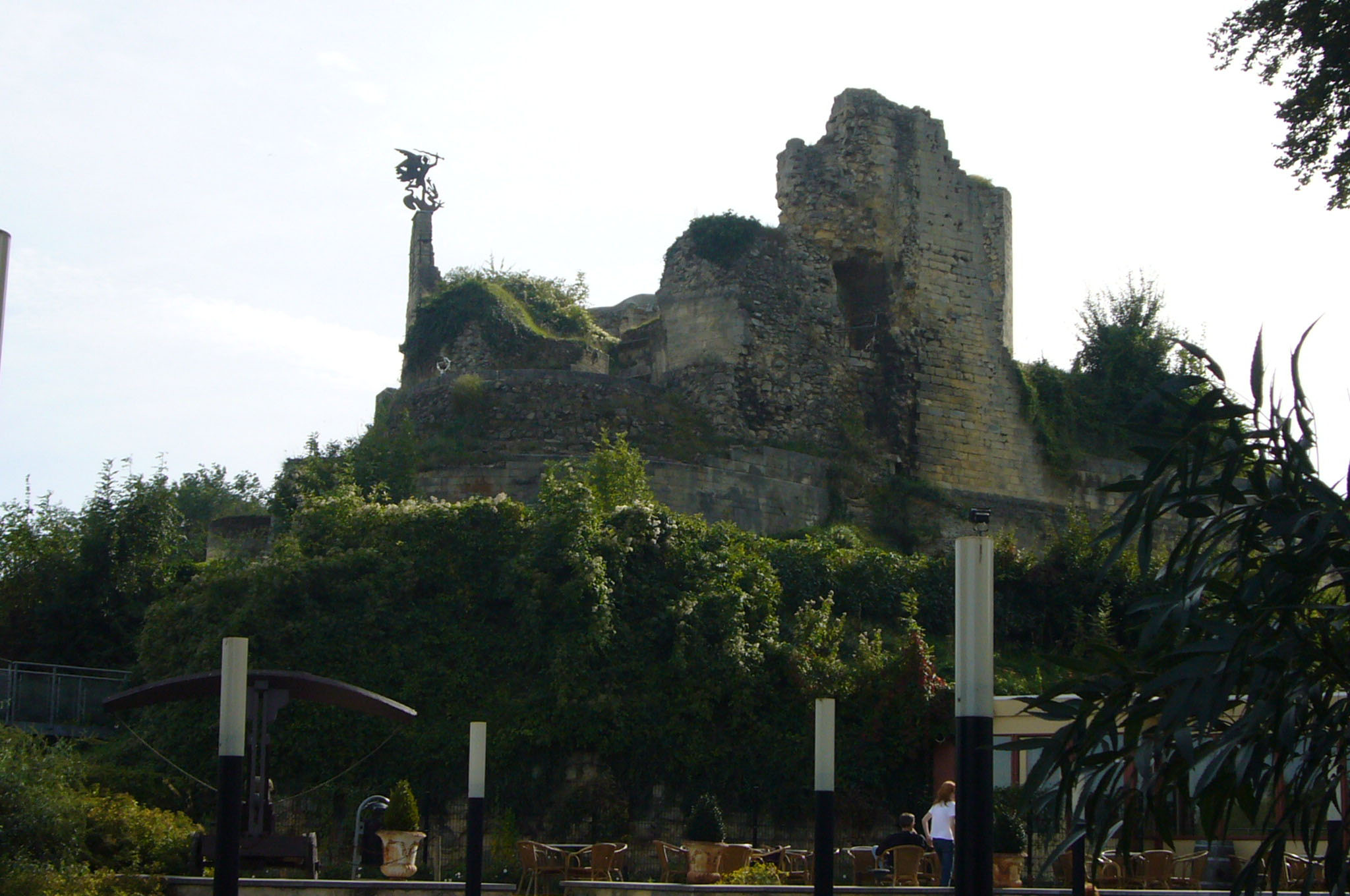
Ruins of the Valkenburg Castle.

In 1082, Goswin, a brother of Gerard, first count of Guelders, was invested with the Lordship of Heinsberg. In 1168, in an inheritance division, emerged the Lordship of Falkenburg. One of the most famous members of this branch is Beatrice of Falkenburg, married to the King of the Romans Richard of Cornwall.

At the end of the 12th century, the heiress of Heinsberg married her cousin from Cleves; this kept the lordship within the family, and prolonged it until 1217, when it was inherited by the House of Sponheim. The Falkenburg branch, in turn, went extinct in 1368; their land was inherited by the Van Schoonvorst family.

== Rulers ==
=== House of Wassenberg ===
Partitions under Wassenberg rule

Lordship of Wassenberg (1021-1096)			Lordship of Cleves (1021-c.1070); Raised to: County of Cleves (c.1070-1368)
		Raised to: County of Guelders (1096-1339)	Lordship of Cleves (1021-c.1070); Raised to: County of Cleves (c.1070-1368)
Lordship of Falkenburg (1168-1352) (Cleves branch from 1212)	Lordship of Heinsberg (1082-1267) (Cleves branch from 1217)	Raised to: County of Guelders (1096-1339)	Lordship of Cleves (1021-c.1070); Raised to: County of Cleves (c.1070-1368)
Lordship of Falkenburg (1168-1352) (Cleves branch from 1212)	Inherited by the House of Sponheim	Raised to: County of Guelders (1096-1339)	Lordship of Cleves (1021-c.1070); Raised to: County of Cleves (c.1070-1368)
Lordship of Falkenburg (1168-1352) (Cleves branch from 1212)	Inherited by the House of Sponheim	Raised to: Duchy of Guelders (1339-1379)	Lordship of Cleves (1021-c.1070); Raised to: County of Cleves (c.1070-1368)
Inherited by the Van Schoonvorst family	Inherited by the House of Sponheim	Raised to: Duchy of Guelders (1339-1379)	Inherited by the House of La Marck
Inherited by the Van Schoonvorst family	Inherited by the House of Sponheim	First War of the Guelderian Succession; Won by the House of Jülich	Inherited by the House of La Marck

Table of rulers

Monarch	Born	Reign	Ruling part	Consort	Death	Notes
Gerard I Flamens	c.980? First son of Rutger of Kamerijk	1021 – 1042	Lordship of Wassenberg	Unknown at least one child	1042 aged 61-62	Brothers, divided their domains.
Rutger I	c.980? Second son of Rutger of Kamerijk	1021 – 1050	Lordship of Cleves	Wazela of Lorraine two children	1050 aged 69-70	Brothers, divided their domains.
Gerard II Flamens	c.1000? Son of Gerard I	1042 – 1052	Lordship of Wassenberg	Liutgard (?) of Hamaland	1052 aged 51-52	
Eberhard	c.1000? First son of Rutger I and Wazela of Lorraine	1050 – 1074	Lordship of Cleves (at Cleves proper; until c.1070) County of Cleves (from c.1070)	Bertha at least one child?	1074 aged 73-74	Children of Rutger, divided the inheritance, but it was quickly reunited.
Rutger II	c.1000? Second son of Rutger I and Wazela of Lorraine	1050 – 1075	Lordship of Cleves (at Tomburg)	Unmarried	1075 aged 74-75	Children of Rutger, divided the inheritance, but it was quickly reunited.
Tomberg rejoined Cleves
Gerard III Flamens	c.1022? First son of Gerard II and Liutgard (?) of Hamaland	1052 – 1075	Lordship of Wassenberg	Adela (?) of Leuven no children	c.1075 aged 52-53?	
Dirk I	c.1050? Son of Eberhard and Bertha	1074 – 1092	County of Cleves	Unknown at least one child?	1092 aged 41-42	
Dirk Flamens	c.1025? Second son of Gerard II and Liutgard (?) of Hamaland	1075 – 19 October 1082	Lordship of Wassenberg	Unknown three children	19 October 1082; Bouillon Castle aged 66-67	
Gerard I Flamens	c.1050? First son of Dirk	19 October 1082 – 8 March 1129	Lordship of Wassenberg (until 1096) County of Guelders (from 1096)	Clementia of Aquitaine; 1086 four children	8 March 1129 aged 78-79	Children of Dirk, divided the inheritance. The Lordship of Wassenberg was promoted to County of Guelders in 1096.
Goswin I	c.1050? Second son of Dirk	19 October 1082 – 1 April 1128	Lordship of Heinsberg	Oda of Walbeck at least two children	1 April 1128 aged 77-78?	Children of Dirk, divided the inheritance. The Lordship of Wassenberg was promoted to County of Guelders in 1096.
Dirk II	c.1070? Son of Dirk I	1092 – 1120	County of Cleves	Unknown at least one child	c.1120 aged 49-50	
Arnold	c.1090? Son of Dirk II	1120 – 20 February 1147	County of Cleves	Ida of Leuven c.1120 three children	c.1120 aged 49-50	
Gerard	c.1090? First son of Goswin I and Oda of Walbeck	1 April 1128 – 1129	Lordship of Heinsberg (in Heinsberg proper)	Irmgard de Plötzkau four children	1129 aged 38-39?	Children of Goswin I, divided the inheritance.
Goswin II	c.1090? Second son of Goswin I and Oda of Walbeck	1 April 1128 – 8 April 1168	Lordship of Heinsberg (at Falkenburg until 1129; in Heinsberg proper since 1129)	Adelaide of Sommerschenburg seven children	8 April 1168 aged 77-78?	Children of Goswin I, divided the inheritance.
Gerard II the Long	c.1090 Son of Gerard I and Clementia of Aquitaine	8 March 1129 – 16 October 1133	County of Guelders (at Geldern)	Ermengarde, Countess of Zutphen; 1116 three children	16 October 1133 aged 42-43	Children of Gerard I, divided their inheritance. Judith inherited the old seat of the family, which she passed to her own children. In compensation, Gerard's marriage to the heiress of Zutphen brought to Guelders a large amount of other important neighbouring lands.
Judith	c.1087 Daughter of Gerard I and Clementia of Aquitaine	8 March 1129 – 1151	County of Guelders (at Wassenberg)	Waleran II, Duke of Limburg; 1107 five children	1151aged 60-61	Children of Gerard I, divided their inheritance. Judith inherited the old seat of the family, which she passed to her own children. In compensation, Gerard's marriage to the heiress of Zutphen brought to Guelders a large amount of other important neighbouring lands.
Wassenberg inherited by the Duchy of Limburg
Henry	1117; Son of Gerard II and Ermengarde, Countess of Zutphen	16 October 1133 – 10 September 1182	County of Guelders	Agnes of Arnstein (d.1171); 1135 five children Lauretta of Flanders; 1173? no children	10 September 1182 aged 42-43	
Dirk III	c.1125 Son of Arnold and Ida of Leuven	20 February 1147 – 27 April 1172	County of Cleves	Adelaide of Sulzbach c.1160 four children	27 April 1172 aged 46-47	
Goswin III	1125; First son of Goswin II and Adelaide of Sommerschenburg	8 April 1168 – 1180	Lordship of Falkenburg	Sophia of Saffenberg three children	1180 aged 54-55?	Children of Goswin II, divided their inheritance.
Godfrey	c.1130 Fourth son of Goswin II and Adelaide of Sommerschenburg	8 April 1168 – 1180	Lordship of Heinsberg (at Heinsberg proper)	Sophia of Loon (c.1150-12 April 1185); 1171/72 one child	c.1180 aged 49-50?	Children of Goswin II, divided their inheritance.
Matilda	1135; Daughter of Goswin II and Adelaide of Sommerschenburg	8 April 1168 – 20 January 1189	Lordship of Heinsberg (at Sommerschenburg)	Dedi III, Margrave of Lusatia c.1155 six children	20 January 1189 aged 53-54	Children of Goswin II, divided their inheritance.
Sommerschenburg inherited by the House of Wettin
Dirk IV	c.1160 First son of Dirk III and Adelaide of Sulzbach	27 April 1172 – 1198	County of Cleves	Margaret of Holland c.1160 four children	1198 aged 37-38	
Goswin IV	1150; Son of Goswin III and Sophia of Saffenberg	1180 – 1207	Lordship of Falkenburg	Judith of Limburg no children	1207 aged 56-57	Left no children. Nominated his cousin Adelaide as his heiress.
Valkenburg briefly annexed to Heinsberg
Adelaide	c.1160 Daughter of Godfrey and Sophia of Loon	1180 – 1217	Lordship of Heinsberg (with Lordship of Falkenburg since 1207)	c.1190 three children	1217 aged 49-50?	Spouses, ruled jointly. Arnold, as the uncle of the count of Cleves, was also his regent for a brief period.
Arnold of Cleves	c.1165 Second son of Dirk III and Adelaide of Sulzbach	1190 – 1201	Lordship of Heinsberg (with Lordship of Falkenburg since 1207)	c.1190 three children	1201 aged 35-36	Spouses, ruled jointly. Arnold, as the uncle of the count of Cleves, was also his regent for a brief period.
Otto I	1150; Son of Henry and Agnes of Arnstein	10 September 1182 – 30 April 1207	County of Guelders	Richardis of Bavaria; 1184 seven children	30 April 1207 aged 56-57	
Regency of Arnold of Cleves, Lord of Heinsberg (1198-1201)						
Dirk V Nust	1185; Son of Dirk IV and Margaret of Holland	1198 – 24 May 1260	County of Cleves	Matilda of Dinslaken (d.1224) c.1210 two children Hedwig of Meissen (d.1249) c.1225 four children	24 May 1260 aged 74-75	
Gerard III	1185; Son of Otto I and Richardis of Bavaria	30 April 1207 – 22 October 1229	County of Guelders	Margaret of Brabant; January 1206 four children	22 October 1229 aged 43-44	
Dirk I	c.1190 Kleve; Son of Arnold of Cleves and Adelaide, Lady of Heinsberg	1217 – 4 November 1227	Lordship of Heinsberg (with Lordship of Falkenburg)	Isolda of Limburg (d.1221) c.1215 three children Beatrice of Kyrburg-Dhaun (d.1240) c.1225 five children	4 November 1227; Heinsberg aged 36-37	
Agnes	c.1215 Daughter of Dirk I and Isolda of Limburg	4 November 1227 – 1267	Lordship of Heinsberg	Henry I (of Sponheim); 1228 six children	1267 aged 51-52	Children of Dirk I, divided their inheritance. Agnes passed her inheritance to her children, from the House of Sponheim.
Regency of Beatrice of Kyrburg-Dhaun (1227-1236)						Children of Dirk I, divided their inheritance. Agnes passed her inheritance to her children, from the House of Sponheim.
Dirk II	1221; Son of Dirk I and Beatrice of Kyrburg-Dhaun	4 November 1227 – 15 October 1268	Lordship of Falkenburg	Bertha of Monschau (1225-20 April 1254) c.1240 three children Adelaide of Loon (1240-1275) c.1260 three children	15 October 1268; Cologne aged 46-47	Children of Dirk I, divided their inheritance. Agnes passed her inheritance to her children, from the House of Sponheim.
Heinsberg inherited by the House of Sponheim
Otto II the Lame	1215; Son of Gerard II and Ermengarde, Countess of Zutphen	22 October 1229 – 10 January 1271	County of Guelders	Margaret of Cleves (d.10 September 1251); 1242 two children Philippa of Dammartin; 1252 four children	10 January 1271 aged 64-65	
Dirk VI of Meissen	1226; Son of Dirk V and Hedwig of Meissen	24 May 1260 – 18 March 1275	County of Cleves	Adelaide of Sponheim-Heinsberg (d.1303) c.1255 six children	18 March 1275 aged 48-49	
Waleran the Red	1254; Son of Dirk II and Bertha of Monschau	15 October 1268 – 5 September 1302	Lordship of Falkenburg	Philippa of Guelders (1255-1295); 1270 three children	15 October 1268; Cologne aged 46-47	
Reginald I the Bellicose	1255; Son of Otto II and Philippa of Dammartin	10 January 1271 – 9 October 1326	County of Guelders	Ermengarde, Duchess of Limburg; 1276 no children Margaret of Flanders; 3 July 1286; Namur six children	9 October 1326; Montfort aged 75-76	Fought in the War of Limburgian Succession, but eventually lost his claim. From 1318 he was imprisoned by his own son and heir.
Regency of Reginald, heir of Guelders (1318-1326)						Fought in the War of Limburgian Succession, but eventually lost his claim. From 1318 he was imprisoned by his own son and heir.
Dirk VII	1256; Son of Dirk VI and Adelaide of Sponheim-Heinsberg	18 March 1275 – 4 October 1305	County of Cleves	Margaret of Guelders (d.1287) c.1275 three children Margaret of Habsburg-Kyburg (d.1333); 1290 eight children	4 October 1305 aged 48-49	
Dirk III	c.1270 First son of Waleran and Philippa of Guelders	5 September 1302 – 16 June 1305	Lordship of Falkenburg	Unmarried	16 June 1305 aged 34-35?	
Reginald	1283; Falkenburg; Second son of Waleran and Philippa of Guelders	16 June 1305 – 18 July 1333	Lordship of Falkenburg	Maria van Boutershem (1287-c.1330); 1303 nine children	18 July 1333; Monschau aged 49-50	
Otto the Peaceable	1278; Son of Dirk VII and Margaret of Guelders	4 October 1305 – 29 October 1310	County of Cleves	Adelaide of the Mark (d.1301) c.1300 no children Matilda of Virneburg (d.1360); 1308 one child	29 October 1310; Horstmar aged 31-32	
Dirk VIII the Pious	1291; First son of Dirk VII and Margaret of Habsburg-Kyburg	29 October 1310 – 7 July 1347	County of Cleves	Margaret of Guelders II (d.1333); 7 May 1308 two children Maria of Jülich (d.1353); 1340 one child	7 July 1347; Horstmar aged 55-56	
Reginald II the Black	1295; Son of Reginald I and Margaret of Flanders	9 October 1326 – 12 October 1343	County of Guelders (until 1339) Duchy of Guelders (from 1339)	Sophia Berthout (d.6 May 1329); 11 January 1311; Roermond four children Eleanor of England; May 1332; Nijmegen two children	12 October 1343; Arnhem aged 47-48	
Dirk IV	1310; Second son of Reginald and Maria van Boutershem	18 July 1333 – 19 July 1346	Lordship of Falkenburg	Machteld van Voorne; 1336 no children	19 July 1346; Vottem aged 46-47	Left no children. The lordship was inherited by his brother.
Regency of Eleanor of England and Dirk IV, Lord of Falkenburg (1343-1344)						
Reginald III the Fat	13 May 1333; First son of Reginald II and Eleanor of England	12 October 1343 – 1361 24 August – 4 December 1371	Duchy of Guelders	Maria of Brabant; 1 July 1347; Tervuren no children	4 December 1371 aged 38	
John	1313; Third son of Reginald and Maria van Boutershem	19 July 1346 – 10 August 1352	Lordship of Falkenburg	Johanna van Voorne c.1340 no children	10 August 1352; Monschau aged 38-39	Left no children. After his death, the lordship was inherited by the Van Schoonvorst family, but in the midst of a succession war. In 1378 it was eventually annexed by the Duchy of Brabant.
Falkenburg inherited by the Van Schoonvorst family
John	1293; Second son of Dirk VII and Margaret of Habsburg-Kyburg	7 July 1347 – 9 December 1368	County of Cleves	Matilda of Guelders; 1348 no children	9 December 1368 aged 74-75	
Cleves inherited by the House of La Marck
Edward	12 March 1336; Second son of Reginald II and Eleanor of England	1361 – 24 August 1371	Duchy of Guelders	Unmarried	24 August 1371; Baesweiler aged 35	Captured his brother in a battle at Tiel. After his death, his brother returned.
Matilda	1325; First daughter of Reginald II and Sophia Berthout	4 December 1371 – 24 March 1379	Duchy of Guelders (claimants against each other)	Godfrey, Count of Loon-Heinsberg; 1336 no children John, Count of Cleves; 1348 no children John II, Count of Blois; 14 February 1372 no children	21 September 1384; Huissen aged 58-59	First War of the Guelderian Succession, between the two half-sisters of Reginald III and Edward. Maria and her family were the victors.
Maria	6 May 1329; Second daughter of Reginald II and Sophia Berthout	4 December 1371 – 24 March 1379	Duchy of Guelders (claimants against each other)	William II, Duke of Jülich; 25 December 1362 three children	12 May 1405 aged 76	First War of the Guelderian Succession, between the two half-sisters of Reginald III and Edward. Maria and her family were the victors.
Guelders inherited by the House of Jülich

Genealogy of the House of Gelders

House of Gelderland

prob. Rodger vm. 960, 983 m. NN van Kamerijk; House of Wassenberg	House of Wassenberg	Count, later Duke of Geldre
Gerard I Flamens(ca. 970 - † bef. 1042); Heer(Lord) van Wassenberg	Rütger I Count of Cleves d.<1092
Gerard II Flamens(Gerardus Flamens) (c. 1000 - < 1052); Heer(Lord) van Wassenberg, 1042 m. prob. a dau. of Van Hamaland fam.	Arnold; Count of Cleves (<1092–c.1147) desc. Counts and Dukes of Cleves
Gerard III Flamens (ca. 1025 - bef. 1076); Heer(Lord) van Wassenberg, 1052 m. d of Hendrik I van Leuven	Diederik I van Heinsberg (Flamens) ( approx. 1030 - 1082) m. d. of gen. Dirk 'van de Veluwe' count of the Veluwe	Willem Hendrik (1054 - 1076) bishop of Utrecht
Gerard IV Flamens(en) gen. Gerard 'de Lange' (ca. 1068 - 1129) from 1096 graaf Gerard I van Gelre; Heer(Lord) van Wassenberg,Count of Geldre,1076; 1m. Sophia N 2m. Clementia van Gleiberg	Hendrik van Kriekenbeek († bef. 1124) verm. vanaf 1082 niet als graaf graaf van Kriekenbeek volgens Annales Rodenses	Gozewijn I van Heinsberg (verm. vanaf 1085 - † 1128) m. da van Walbeck; 1119 de castello Falcomonte door huwelijk Heer van Valkenburg stamvader Huis Heinsberg/Valkenburg	Gerard van Heinsberg
Gerard II van Gelre(en) (Gerard V van Wassenberg) (ca 1090-1131/1133); Count of Geldre,1129	Lords of Valkenburg, to 1352 in male line	Lords of Heinsberg, in male line to 1189
Hendrik I van Gelre (en) (1117-1182); Count of Geldre, 1133
Gerard van Gelre ( - bef. 1182) m. Ida van Boulogne	Otto I van Gelre (en) (1150 - 1207); Count of Geldre, 1182
Hendrik (- ca. 1198) eng. to Ada van Holland, dau. of Dirk VII, Count of Holland	Gerard III van Gelre (en) (ca 1185-1229); Count of Geldre, 1207	Otto I (1193–1213) bishop of Utrecht
Otto II(en) (-1271); Count of Geldre, 1229	Hendrik (-1285) bishop van Luik(Liege)
Reinoud I van Gelre(en) (1255 – 1326); Count of Geldre, 1271
1m. Sophia Berthout (died 1329),Lady of Mechelen	Reinoud II van Gelre (en); Rode of de Zwarte (ca. 1295 – 1343); Count of Geldre, 1326; Duke of Geldre, 1339	2m. Eleanor of Woodstock, daughter of King Edward II (1318–1355)
Margaretha (ca. 1320 - 4 oktober 1344) m. 1342 Gerard, s. of countWilliam VI of Julich. Zij was reeds op 1 maart 1333 verloofd met Gerard, naar aanleiding waarvan zij op 1 december 1333 de heerlijkheid en voogdij Mechelen voor 60.000 gulden verkocht aan graaf Lodewijk van Vlaanderen.	Mechteld (ca. 1323-1384); 1m. in 1336 count Godfried van Loon-Heinsberg (ca. 1320-1342), 2m. 1348 w/ count Jan I van Cleves (1292/93-1368); 3m. 1372 met John II of Blois (ca. 1342-1381). no children	Maria (-1397) m 1362	William II/VII of Julich{en); II duke of Jülich duke (ca. 1326-1393)	Reinoud III van Gelre(en) (1333 - 1371); Duke of Geldre, 1343-61, dep. by this brother	Eduard van Gelre(en) (1336 – 1371); Duke of Geldre, 1361-71
Margaret of Ravensberg	Gerhard VI count of Berg, Ravensberg	House of Jülich
William VII of Jülich, 1st Duke of Berg duke of Berg, count of Ravensberg	William (1364 – 1402, Duke of Geldre, 1377, & III of Jülich, 1393 ∞ Katherine of Bavaria	Reinald IV (c. 1365 – 1423); Duke of Geldre & duke of Jülich, 1402	Joanna of Jülich ∞ John V lord of Arkel
Adolf duke of Jülich-Berg	William VIII count of Ravensberg	Marie of Harcourt (daughter of John VI count of Harcourt)	Maria van Arkel m.Jan II van Egmont (en) lord of Egmond	HOUSE OF EGMONT
Rupert	Gerhard VII duke of Jülich-Berg, count of Ravensberg	Katharina van Kleef (1417-1476)	Arnold van Egmont (en) (1410 – 1473); Duke of Geldre , 1423-1465, 1471-1473; HOUSE OF EGMONT	Willem IV van Egmont (en) (1412–1483); Lord of Egmont and IJsselstein, stadtholder of Guelders
William; IV duke of Jülich-Berg, count of Ravensberg ∞ Sibylle of Brandenburg	Maria van Egmont-Gelre(en) (ca. 1429/1434-1463); Queen consort of Scotland, spouse of James II	Willem van Egmont (1434-jong overleden)	Margaretha van Egmont (1436-1486)	Adolf van Egmond (en) (Grave, 12 februari 1438 – Doornik, 27 juni 1477); Duke of Geldre, 1465-1471, 1477	Catharina van Egmont (ca. 1440-1497), regent of Geldre, 1477 - 1492 (Was appt. by the States of Guelders as regent as long as there was no duke. Rule contested by Maximilian of Austria.)
Catharina of Bourbon (1440-1469)	Jan III van Egmont (en) (1438 – 1516); Lord of Egmond, 1483-1516, created Count of Egmond, 1486; Heer van Purmerland en Ilpendam, 1483; Stadhouder van Holland, Zeeland en West-Friesland, 1483-1515	Frederik van Egmont (en) (ca 1440 – 1521); Count of Buren and Leerdam, 1492; Lord of IJsselstein, 1464; Stadhouder van Gelre en Zutphen, 1507 - 1511; Stadhouder van Friesland, 1515 - 1518	Willem van Egmont (d.1494) stadhouder van Gelre
Maria ∞ John III duke of Cleves; HOUSE OF LA MARCK	Filippa van Egmont (1467 - 1547) m. Rene II, Duke of Lorraine from here the House of Lorraine desc. & claims Geldre	Karel van Gelre (en) (Grave, 9 november 1467 – Arnhem, 30 juni 1538); Duke of Geldre ,1492–1538 m. Elisabeth van Brunswijk-Lüneburg	Jan IV van Egmont (en); 1499–1528); 2nd Count of Egmont, 9th Lord of Purmerend, Purmerland and Ilpendam m. Francisca van Luxemburg(en)	Philip van Egmond (1502 - 1529), heer van Baer	Jurrien van Egmond (1503), abt van St. Amant, heer van Baer. He gave the lordship of Baer to Karel, the oldest son of his brother Jan.	George or Joris van Egmont (ca. 1504 - 1559) bishop of Utrecht, 1534
Margaretha (1517 – Bar-le-Duc 10 march 1554), gehuwd met Nicolaas van Lotharingen (1524 – 1577)	Karel († Cartagena 7 december 1541); 3rd Count of Egmont, 10th Lord of Purmerend, Purmerland and Ilpendam, 1528 lord of Baer	Lamoraal (en) (1522 – executed 1568); 4th Count of Egmont, 11th Lord of Purmerend, Purmerland and Ilpendam, lord of Baer, 1541; Prince of Gavere, 1553; Captain General of the Lowlands under Charles V knight of the Golden Fleece,1546, Imperial Chamberlain. defeated the French in the battles of Saint-Quentin (1557) and Gravelines (1558). Stadholder of Flanders and Artois, 1559
