= Siege of Venlo =

Siege of Venlo may refer to:

- Siege of Venlo (1373)
- Siege of Venlo (1459)
- Siege of Venlo (1473)
- Siege of Venlo (1478)
- Siege of Venlo (1480)
- Siege of Venlo (1499)
- Siege of Venlo (1511)
- Siege of Venlo (1543)
- Siege of Venlo (1572)
- Siege of Venlo (1579)
- Siege of Venlo (1586)
- Siege of Venlo (1593)
- Venlo Treason
- Siege of Venlo (1606)
- Siege of Venlo (1632)
- Siege of Venlo (1637)
- Siege of Venlo (1646)
- Siege of Venlo (1701)
- Siege of Venlo (1702)
- Siege of Venlo (1793)
- Siege of Venlo (1830)
