= Mechteld of Guelders =

Duchess of Guelders

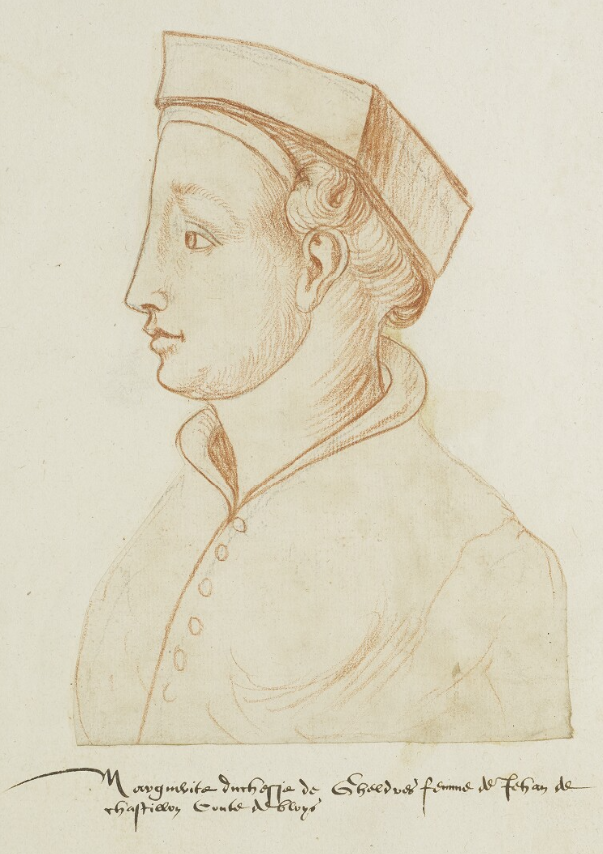
Portrait of Mechtild of Guelders from the 16th-century Recueil d'Arras

Mechtild of Guelders (c. 1324 – Huissen, 21 September 1384) was the ruling suo jure Duchess of Guelders from 1371 to 1379, after succeeding her brother, Reginald III, Duke of Guelders.

== Life ==
Mechtild was born around 1324 as the second-oldest daughter of Reginald II of Guelders. She married Godfrey of Loon-Heinsberg, her second cousin, in 1336. After Godfrey's death in 1342, she married Johann, Count of Cleves in 1348. By marriage, she was countess of Cleves between 1347 and 1368. Both marriages remained childless.

When her brothers Edward, Duke of Guelders and Reginald III, Duke of Guelders both died without issue in 1371, both Mechtild and her younger sister Mary made a claim on the Duchy of Guelders. The Duchy explicitly allowed for female succession, and Mechtild had the right to inherit as the eldest daughter. However, there were still hesitations to choose Mechtild, because the selection of a childless ruler would result in a future succession crisis. Mary, on the other hand, had two sons with William II, Duke of Jülich, of which the eldest, William of Guelders and Jülich, was the closest living male blood relative to the dukes of Guelders.

The nobility and the cities of Guelders became divided into two factions: the Heeckerens, who supported Mechtild, and the Bronckhorsters, who supported Mary and William. This conflict resulted in the First War of the Guelderian Succession, which took place between 1371 and 1379. Outside of the Duchy of Guelders, Mechtild formed alliances with the Diocese of Utrecht and its bishop Arnold II of Horne, as well as with the Counties of Cleves and Mark and the Duchy of Brabant. In February 1372, she married John II, Count of Blois, to strengthen her legitimacy for the ducal throne. This marriage also remained childless.

In June 1372, Charles IV, Holy Roman Emperor gave his support to Mary in recognition of her husband, who had agreed to release Wenceslaus I, Duke of Luxembourg, the emperor's brother, from captivity after he had kept hostage after the Battle of Baesweiler. In 1374, the sisters agreed to sign a treaty in which they divided Guelders among each other. However, Mechtild and her followers continued to fight until they were finally forced to give up and retread from the Duchy in 1379.

Mechtild spent the final years of her life on her castle in Huissen, which she had received as dower from Johann of Cleves in 1368.
