= Siege of Venlo (1373) =

1373 battle in Europe

Date	1373
Location	Venlo (present-day the Netherlands) 51°22′00″N 6°10′00″E
- Location within Netherlands Siege of Venlo (1373) (Germany)

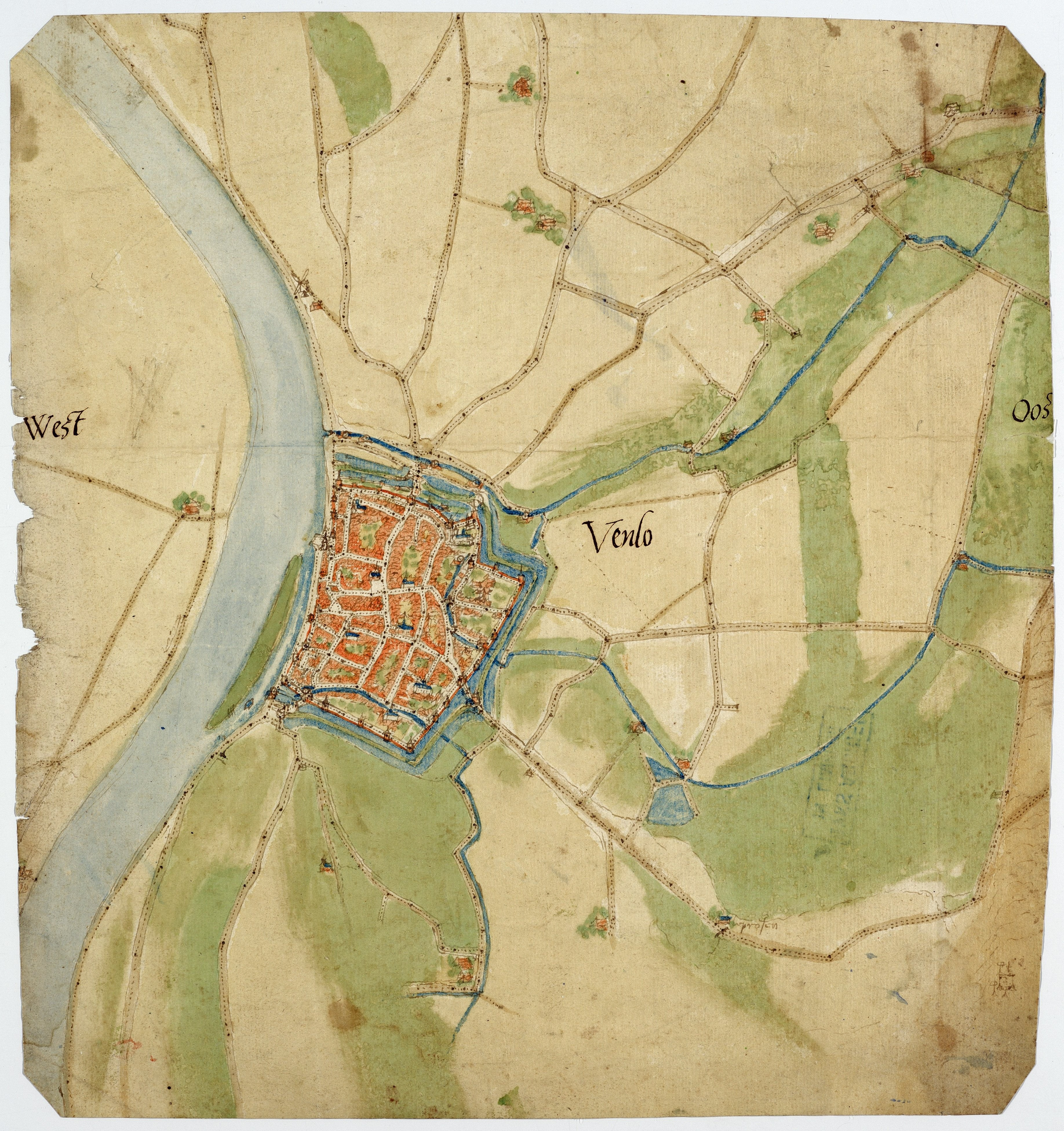
Map of Venlo, 1560, by Jacob van Deventer

The siege of Venlo in 1373 is one of the many sieges which the Dutch city of Venlo has known. This siege was the first in a long line of sieges which the city has known for centuries.

By the end of the 13th century, Johan van Broeckhuysen was lent the allodium of Venlo as Knight by the Count of Guelders. Around 1300, Van Broeckhuysen had built an enhanced Stone House (City Hall). The underground vaults of the house still exist, but in 1597, from the ground floor a new City Hall was built.

In 1343, Venlo was given city rights by Reinoud II of Guelders (who died later that year), and was therefore allowed to build city walls. The construction of this stronghold took several decades, but gradually it became a solid structure.

In 1373, the reigning house of Guelders died off (reigning duke Reinoud III of Guelders had no children), and a fight burst out between the two surviving sisters Reinoud III had, Mary and Margaret. Meanwhile, Johan van Broeckhuysen also deceased, but his grandson (also named Johan) wanted the former alodium of his family not to fall into Jülich hands. That same year he organized a force, joined John II of Blois who was married to Mary, and thus took part in the First Guelders Succession War.

John of Blois lost the battle, and thus the city of Venlo, and the duchy was joined to the Jülich duchy.
