= First War of the Guelderian Succession =

Battle for the throne of the Duchy of Guelders that raged between 1371 and 1379

Date	1371–1379
Location	Duchy of Guelders
Result	Victory of William of Jülich

Belligerents
Duchy of Jülich; Bronckhorst faction	Heeckeren faction

Commanders and leaders
William II, Duke of Jülich; William I of Guelders and Jülich(from 1377); Mary of Guelders	Mechteld of Guelders; John II, Count of Blois; Reinoud I van Brederode; Arnold II of Horne

The First War of the Guelderian Succession was a battle for the throne of the Duchy of Guelders that raged between 1371 and 1379.

The war originated when Duke Reginald III died without issue on 4 December 1371. His brother, Edward, who had been killed in the Battle of Baesweiler earlier that same year, also left no offspring. The claimants to the ducal throne were their half-sisters: Mechtild who was married twice before but without offspring, and Mary, wife of William II of Jülich and mother to William I of Guelders and Jülich, on whose behalf she claimed the throne of Guelders.

During this conflict, the nobility and cities of 14th-century Guelders were divided in two factions, the Heeckerens and Bronckhorsters. This division had previously occurred during the Guelders Fratricidal War (1350-1361) between Edward and Reginald III. Both fractions were named after and led by a prominent Guelderian noble family.

- The Heeckerens supported Mechtild, and were led by Frederik van Heeckeren van der Eze (1320-1386).
- The Bronckhorsters supported William, and were led by Gijsbert V van Bronckhorst (1328-1356).

The war lasted eight years. In 1379, Mary and her supporters emerged victorious, with Mary's son William becoming the next duke of Guelders.

== Timeline ==
- 1372: Heeckeren-aligned knight Gozewijn van Varik conquers Tiel in July. Throughout the year, struggles continue within the city.
- 1372: the Bronckhorst faction carries out raids in the Bishopric of Utrecht, presumably because the bishop of Utrecht Arnold II of Horne had joined their enemies.
- 1372/73: troops of Arnold II of Horne conquer Harderwijk on behalf of Mechtild.
- 1373: The Heeckeren faction begins the Siege of Venlo.
- 1374: Reinoud I van Brederode conquers Tiel on behalf of Mechtild.
- 1376: the leaders of the Bronckhorst faction are ambushed and taken as prisoners near Oosterbeek.
- 1377: Emperor Charles IV assigns the duchy to William I of Guelders and Jülich, who is now of age.
- 1378 (October-November): The Genneperhuys, residence of Reinoud I van Brederode, is besieged by the Bronckhorst forces from October 19 onwards. An army from Cleves that wants to relieve the castle is stopped at Hönnepel. During the siege, the young Willem van Gulik en Gelre is knighted by his father.
- 1379, the village of Zennewijnen with its church and abbey are destroyed by the Bronckhorst faction.
- 1379 (March 24): Mechtild was defeated by the troops of Julich and resigned her rights to the duchy.
