= Margaret of Flanders =

Margaret of Flanders may refer to:

- Margaret I, Countess of Flanders (c. 1145 – 15 November 1194)
- Margaret II, Countess of Flanders (1202 – 10 February 1280), also Countess of Hainaut, often called Margaret of Constantinople
- Margaret III, Countess of Flanders (13 April 1350 – 16/21 March 1405) also countess of Artois and Burgundy, wife of Philip I, Duke of Burgundy, and later wife of Philip the Bold
- Margaret of Flanders, Duchess of Brabant (c. 1253 – 3 July 1285), wife of John I, Duke of Brabant
- Margaret of Flanders, Countess of Guelders, wife of Prince Alexander of Scotland (son of Alexander III of Scotland) and later wife of Reinald I van Gelre
