= Otto II of Zutphen =

12th-century Dutch nobleman

Otto II was a Dutch nobleman from the early 12th century who was Count of Zutphen from 1101 until his death in 1113. Otto was the son of Gottschalk and Adelheid of Zutphen, herself the daughter of Liudolf of Lotharingia. Liudolf was the grandson of the Holy Roman Emperor Otto II and Theophanu. In 1107, Otto II of Zutphen received the Frisian domains of Westergo, Oostergo and Suthergo from Henry V, Holy Roman Emperor, in exchange for landed possessions around what is now Alzey in Germany.

Otto's exact genealogy is unclear. His maternal grandfather may have been Otto of Hammerstein, who may have been the first Count of Zutphen. Alternatively, Adelheid may have been a daughter of Liudolf of Zutphen and Mathilda of Hammerstein, who was herself the daughter of Otto of Hammerstein.

Otto II, known as "Otto the Rich", married Judith of Arnstein. They had four children:

- Henry II, Count of Zutphen, Westergo, Oostergo and Suthergo (died before 1134), married Mathilde of Beichlingen, daughter of Kuno, Count of Beichlingen and Kunigunde of Weimar.
- Dirk (Diederik) of Zutphen (died before 1134), Bishop of Munster.
- Gerard (died before 1134).
- Ermengarde of Zutphen, married 1) Gerard II, Count of Guelders and 2) Conrad II, Count of Luxembourg, son of William I, Count of Luxembourg and Luitgard von Beichlingen. Ermengarde was Countess of Zutphen from 1122 to 1138.

== Literature ==
- Pieter Lodewijk Muller: Otto II., Graf von Zütphen. In: Allgemeine Deutsche Biographie (ADB). Band 24, Duncker & Humblot, Leipzig 1887, S. 741.
