= Lordship of Heinsberg =

The Lordship of Heinsberg was a territory within the Holy Roman Empire, centred on the city of Heinsberg. The most notable member of the house of Heinsberg was Philip I, archbishop and archchancellor.

== History ==
From 1413 the town of Wassenberg was given to the Lordship of Heinsberg, as security for a debt amounting to 20,000 Rhenish guilders.

== Rulers ==
- Goswin I: ?–1086 (Deposed)
- Gerhard: ? – ?
- Goswin II: ? – 1168 (Died)
- Goswin III: 1168 – 1168 (Deposed)
- Arnold I: 1168 – ?, younger son of Dietrich II, Count of Cleves, in 1168 became lord in right of his wife Alix of Heinsberg, possible daughter of Goswin II.
- Arnold II: ? – 1218 (Died), son of Arnold and Alix.
- Henry II of Sponheim (d. 1258/1259), founder of the Sponheim-Heinsberg line as Henry I, jure uxoris lord of Heinsberg in right of his wife Agnes of Heinsberg (French: Agnès de Clèves-Valkenbourg-Heinsberg), lady of Heinsberg, daughter of Arnold II.
