= Ermengarde of Zutphen =

Dutch noble

Countess of Zutphen
- Reign: 1122–1138
- Predecessor: Henry II
- Successor: Henry III
- Died: 1138
- Noble family: van Zutphen
- Spouse: Gerard II, Count of Guelders
- Issue: Henry I, Count of Guelders; Adélaïde; Salomé
- Father: Otto II, Count of Zutphen
- Mother: Judith of Arnstein

Ermengarde of Zutphen (died 1138) was countess of Zutphen (1122–1138), succeeding her elder brother Henry II, Count of Zutphen (her other two brothers had taken holy orders and died respectively). Their parents were Otto II, Count of Zutphen and Judith of Arnstein.

She first married around 1116 to Gerard II (d. 1131), count of Guelders and of Wassenberg, and had :

- Henry I (d. 1182), count of Guelders and of Zutphen
- Adélaïde, married Ekbert, count of Tecklenburg, and had Henry I, Count of Tecklenburg
- Salomé (d. 1167), married Henry I, count of Wildeshausen

Widowed, she remarried to Conrad II (d. 1136), count of Luxembourg, but the marriage remained childless.

== Sources ==
- Ermgard, 1118-1129, Gravin van Zutphen

Preceded by Henry II	Countess of Zutphen; 1122–1138	Succeeded by Henry III
