= Counts and dukes of Guelders =

List of rulers of part of the Low Countries up to 1598

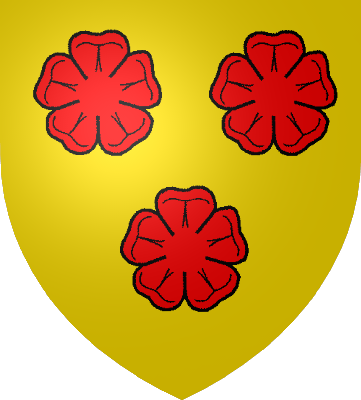
Original coat of arms of the County and Duchy of Guelders (House of Wassenberg)

Coat of arms after 1379 (House of Jülich-Hengebach)

Guelders is a historical duchy, previously county, of the Holy Roman Empire, located in the Low Countries.

== Counts ==
=== House of Wassenberg ===
- before 1096–about 1129: Gerard I
- about 1129–about 1131: Gerard II, son of Gerard I
- about 1131–1182: Henry I, son of Gerard II
- 1182–1207: Otto I, son of Henry I
- 1207–1229: Gerard III, son of Otto I
- 1229–1271: Otto II, son of Gerard III
- 1271–1318: Reginald I, son of Otto II
- 1318–1343: Reginald II, son of Reginald I

== Dukes ==
=== House of Wassenberg ===
During Reginald II's reign, the county of Guelders was elevated to a duchy with the Wessenberg-Maccan.

- 1318–1343: Reginald II
  - 1343–1344: Eleanor, wife of Reginald II, regent of Reginald III
- 1343–1361: Reginald III, son of Reginald II and Eleanor
- 1361–1371: Edward, son of Reginald II and Eleanor
- 1371: Reginald III, second time

After the death of Reginald III without issue, two of his half-sisters disputed the succession of the Duchy of Guelders:

- 1371–1379 Matilde (d. 1384) and her husband, John II, Count of Blois (d. 1381)
- 1371–1379 Maria (d. 1397) and her husband, William II, Duke of Jülich (d. 1393)

=== House of Jülich-Hengebach ===
- 1379–1402: William I, son of Maria and William II
- 1402–1423: Reginald IV, son of Maria and William II

=== House of Egmond ===
- 1423–1465: Arnold, grandnephew of Reginald IV, son of John II
  - 1423–1436: John II, father and regent of Arnold
- 1465–1471: Adolf, son of Arnold
- 1471–1473: Arnold, second time

Arnold sold the Duchy of Guelders to Charles I, Duke of Burgundy, who was recognized by the Holy Roman Emperor as Duke of Guelders.

=== House of Burgundy ===
- 1473–1477: Charles I
- 1477–1482: Mary, daughter of Charles I, wife of Maximillian

=== House of Habsburg ===
- 1477–1482: Maximillian I, ruler jure uxoris
- 1482–1492: Philip I, son of Mary and Maximilian I

=== House of Egmond ===
The Egmond family did not abandon their claims to Guelders and Charles II, Duke of Guelders conquered the Duchy in 1492. As Duke his regent was his aunt Catherine of Guelders. Charles remained in power with support of the French king.

- 1492–1538: Charles II, son of Adolf

=== House of La Marck ===
- 1538–1543: William II, distant relative and successor of the House of Egmond

=== House of Habsburg ===
- 1543–1555: Charles III, son of Philip I
- 1555–1598: Philip II, son of Charles III

== Genealogy ==
Genealogy of the House of Gelders

House of Gelderland

prob. Rodger vm. 960, 983 m. NN van Kamerijk; House of Wassenberg	House of Wassenberg	Count, later Duke of Geldre
Gerard I Flamens(ca. 970 - † bef. 1042); Heer(Lord) van Wassenberg	Rütger I Count of Cleves d.<1092
Gerard II Flamens(Gerardus Flamens) (c. 1000 - < 1052); Heer(Lord) van Wassenberg, 1042 m. prob. a dau. of Van Hamaland fam.	Arnold; Count of Cleves (<1092–c.1147) desc. Counts and Dukes of Cleves
Gerard III Flamens (ca. 1025 - bef. 1076); Heer(Lord) van Wassenberg, 1052 m. d of Hendrik I van Leuven	Diederik I van Heinsberg (Flamens) ( approx. 1030 - 1082) m. d. of gen. Dirk 'van de Veluwe' count of the Veluwe	Willem Hendrik (1054 - 1076) bishop of Utrecht
Gerard IV Flamens(en) gen. Gerard 'de Lange' (ca. 1068 - 1129) from 1096 graaf Gerard I van Gelre; Heer(Lord) van Wassenberg,Count of Geldre,1076; 1m. Sophia N 2m. Clementia van Gleiberg	Hendrik van Kriekenbeek († bef. 1124) verm. vanaf 1082 niet als graaf graaf van Kriekenbeek volgens Annales Rodenses	Gozewijn I van Heinsberg (verm. vanaf 1085 - † 1128) m. da van Walbeck; 1119 de castello Falcomonte door huwelijk Heer van Valkenburg stamvader Huis Heinsberg/Valkenburg	Gerard van Heinsberg
Gerard II van Gelre(en) (Gerard V van Wassenberg) (ca 1090-1131/1133); Count of Geldre,1129	Lords of Valkenburg, to 1352 in male line	Lords of Heinsberg, in male line to 1189
Hendrik I van Gelre (en) (1117-1182); Count of Geldre, 1133
Gerard van Gelre ( - bef. 1182) m. Ida van Boulogne	Otto I van Gelre (en) (1150 - 1207); Count of Geldre, 1182
Hendrik (- ca. 1198) eng. to Ada van Holland, dau. of Dirk VII, Count of Holland	Gerard III van Gelre (en) (ca 1185-1229); Count of Geldre, 1207	Otto I (1193–1213) bishop of Utrecht
Otto II(en) (-1271); Count of Geldre, 1229	Hendrik (-1285) bishop van Luik(Liege)
Reinoud I van Gelre(en) (1255 – 1326); Count of Geldre, 1271
1m. Sophia Berthout (died 1329),Lady of Mechelen	Reinoud II van Gelre (en); Rode of de Zwarte (ca. 1295 – 1343); Count of Geldre, 1326; Duke of Geldre, 1339	2m. Eleanor of Woodstock, daughter of King Edward II (1318–1355)
Margaretha (ca. 1320 - 4 oktober 1344) m. 1342 Gerard, s. of countWilliam VI of Julich. Zij was reeds op 1 maart 1333 verloofd met Gerard, naar aanleiding waarvan zij op 1 december 1333 de heerlijkheid en voogdij Mechelen voor 60.000 gulden verkocht aan graaf Lodewijk van Vlaanderen.	Mechteld (ca. 1323-1384); 1m. in 1336 count Godfried van Loon-Heinsberg (ca. 1320-1342), 2m. 1348 w/ count Jan I van Cleves (1292/93-1368); 3m. 1372 met John II of Blois (ca. 1342-1381). no children	Maria (-1397) m 1362	William II/VII of Julich{en); II duke of Jülich duke (ca. 1326-1393)	Reinoud III van Gelre(en) (1333 - 1371); Duke of Geldre, 1343-61, dep. by this brother	Eduard van Gelre(en) (1336 – 1371); Duke of Geldre, 1361-71
Margaret of Ravensberg	Gerhard VI count of Berg, Ravensberg	House of Jülich
William VII of Jülich, 1st Duke of Berg duke of Berg, count of Ravensberg	William (1364 – 1402, Duke of Geldre, 1377, & III of Jülich, 1393 ∞ Katherine of Bavaria	Reinald IV (c. 1365 – 1423); Duke of Geldre & duke of Jülich, 1402	Joanna of Jülich ∞ John V lord of Arkel
Adolf duke of Jülich-Berg	William VIII count of Ravensberg	Marie of Harcourt (daughter of John VI count of Harcourt)	Maria van Arkel m.Jan II van Egmont (en) lord of Egmond	HOUSE OF EGMONT
Rupert	Gerhard VII duke of Jülich-Berg, count of Ravensberg	Katharina van Kleef (1417-1476)	Arnold van Egmont (en) (1410 – 1473); Duke of Geldre , 1423-1465, 1471-1473; HOUSE OF EGMONT	Willem IV van Egmont (en) (1412–1483); Lord of Egmont and IJsselstein, stadtholder of Guelders
William; IV duke of Jülich-Berg, count of Ravensberg ∞ Sibylle of Brandenburg	Maria van Egmont-Gelre(en) (ca. 1429/1434-1463); Queen consort of Scotland, spouse of James II	Willem van Egmont (1434-jong overleden)	Margaretha van Egmont (1436-1486)	Adolf van Egmond (en) (Grave, 12 februari 1438 – Doornik, 27 juni 1477); Duke of Geldre, 1465-1471, 1477	Catharina van Egmont (ca. 1440-1497), regent of Geldre, 1477 - 1492 (Was appt. by the States of Guelders as regent as long as there was no duke. Rule contested by Maximilian of Austria.)
Catharina of Bourbon (1440-1469)	Jan III van Egmont (en) (1438 – 1516); Lord of Egmond, 1483-1516, created Count of Egmond, 1486; Heer van Purmerland en Ilpendam, 1483; Stadhouder van Holland, Zeeland en West-Friesland, 1483-1515	Frederik van Egmont (en) (ca 1440 – 1521); Count of Buren and Leerdam, 1492; Lord of IJsselstein, 1464; Stadhouder van Gelre en Zutphen, 1507 - 1511; Stadhouder van Friesland, 1515 - 1518	Willem van Egmont (d.1494) stadhouder van Gelre
Maria ∞ John III duke of Cleves; HOUSE OF LA MARCK	Filippa van Egmont (1467 - 1547) m. Rene II, Duke of Lorraine from here the House of Lorraine desc. & claims Geldre	Karel van Gelre (en) (Grave, 9 november 1467 – Arnhem, 30 juni 1538); Duke of Geldre ,1492–1538 m. Elisabeth van Brunswijk-Lüneburg	Jan IV van Egmont (en); 1499–1528); 2nd Count of Egmont, 9th Lord of Purmerend, Purmerland and Ilpendam m. Francisca van Luxemburg(en)	Philip van Egmond (1502 - 1529), heer van Baer	Jurrien van Egmond (1503), abt van St. Amant, heer van Baer. He gave the lordship of Baer to Karel, the oldest son of his brother Jan.	George or Joris van Egmont (ca. 1504 - 1559) bishop of Utrecht, 1534
Margaretha (1517 – Bar-le-Duc 10 march 1554), gehuwd met Nicolaas van Lotharingen (1524 – 1577)	Karel († Cartagena 7 december 1541); 3rd Count of Egmont, 10th Lord of Purmerend, Purmerland and Ilpendam, 1528 lord of Baer	Lamoraal (en) (1522 – executed 1568); 4th Count of Egmont, 11th Lord of Purmerend, Purmerland and Ilpendam, lord of Baer, 1541; Prince of Gavere, 1553; Captain General of the Lowlands under Charles V knight of the Golden Fleece,1546, Imperial Chamberlain. defeated the French in the battles of Saint-Quentin (1557) and Gravelines (1558). Stadholder of Flanders and Artois, 1559
