= Reinald III of Guelders =

Dutch noble (1333–1371)

Reginald III
- Duke of Guelders
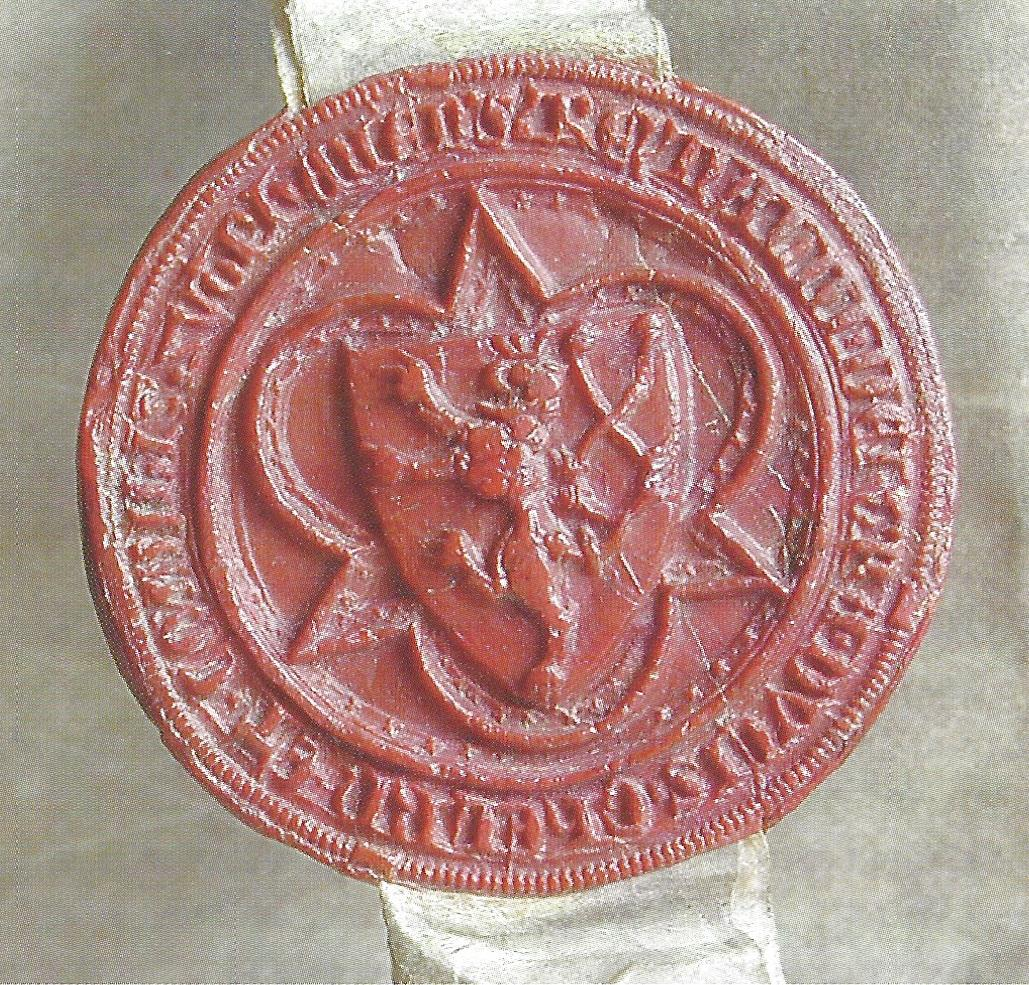
- Born: 13 May 1333
- Died: 4 December 1371 (aged 38)
- Noble family: Wassenberg
- Spouse: Marie of Brabant (m. 1347)
- Issue: Illegitimate: Johan (Jan) of Hattem; Ponte of Guelders
- Father: Reginald II of Guelders
- Mother: Eleanor of Woodstock

Reginald III (French: Rainaud or Renaud, known as "The Fat") (13 May 1333 – 4 December 1371) was Duke of Guelders and Count of Zutphen from 1343 to 1361, and again in 1371. He was the son of Reginald II of Guelders and of Eleanor of Woodstock, daughter of Edward II of England.

With the death of his father in 1343, his mother held the regency until 1344. From 1350, his brother Edward asserted his rights and a quarrel of succession broke out between the two brothers until 1361. Reginald was overcome in Tiel and was imprisoned in the castle of Nijenbeek. There he became so large that he could not have left, even if the door had been open—hence his appellation "The Fat". Edward died on 24 August 1371, having been mortally wounded in the Battle of Baesweiler, and Reginald was released (according to the legend, the walls had to be cut away so he could leave); he held the ducal throne for only a short period, dying a few months later. He was buried at Graefenthal Abbey.

As he did not have a legitimate child, the succession passed to his sisters: Mathilde (also, Machteld), who was married to John II, Count of Blois, and Maria, wife of William II of Jülich and mother to William I of Guelders and Jülich, on whose behalf she claimed the throne of Guelders. The sisters and their respective followers (the Heeckerens, from the party led by families of Van Heeckeren and their relatives, the Van Rechterens, supported Mathilde, while the faction known as the Bronkhorsters followed Maria) fought for the duchy of Guelders in the War of the Succession of Guelders.

== Marriage and children ==
On 1 July 1347 in Tervuren, he married Marie of Brabant (1325–1399), lady of Turnhout, daughter of John III, Duke of Brabant and Marie d'Evreux.

They did not have children, but Reginald had an illegitimate son, Johan (Jan) of Hattem, and an illegitimate daughter, Ponte of Guelders, who married Johan van Groesbeek (d. 1428), lord of Heumen and Malden.

== Sources ==
- Boffa, Sergio (2004). Warfare in Medieval Brabant, 1356-1406. The Boydell Press.
- Hamilton, J. S., ed. (2006). Fourteenth Century England. Vol. 4. The Boydell Press.

Preceded by Reginald II	Duke of Guelders; 1343–1361	Succeeded by Edward
Preceded by Edward	Duke of Guelders; 1371	Vacant Succession war Title next held by William I
