= Reinald II of Guelders =

Dutch noble (1295–1343)

Reginald II
- Duke of Guelders
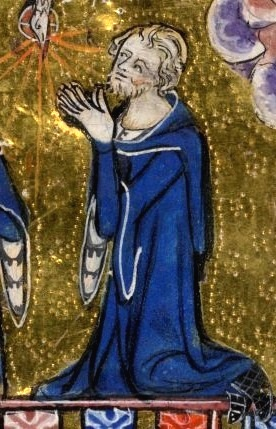
- Born: c. 1295
- Died: 12 October 1343; Arnhem
- Noble family: Wassenberg
- Spouses: Sophia Berthout (m. 1311; died 1329) Eleanor of Woodstock (m. 1332)
- Issue: Marguerite; Mathilde of Guelders; Elisabeth; Maria, Duchess of Guelders; Reinald III of Guelders; Edward, Duke of Guelders
- Father: Reginald I of Guelders
- Mother: Marguerite of Flanders

Reginald II of Guelders (Dutch: Reinoud), called "the Black" (c. 1295 – 12 October 1343), was Count of Guelders, and from 1339 onwards Duke of Guelders, and Zutphen, in the Low Countries, from 1326 to 1343. He was the son of Reginald I of Guelders and Marguerite of Flanders.

== Biography ==
From 1316, he acted as regent in the county, imprisoned his father in 1318, and governed as "son of the Count". When in 1326 his father died, he styled himself Count of Guelders and Count of Zutphen. In 1339 Guelders was raised to a duchy. He was a law giver, in 1321 on customary law, and in 1335 on dykes and canals.

He allied himself against the French with Edward III, his brother-in-law, warning the English in 1338 of a French fleet gathering in the mouth of the Zwin. He remained Edward's closest ally among the German princes in the first phase of the Hundred Years War.

== Family ==
Reginald's first marriage (Roermond, 11 January 1311) was to Sophia Berthout (died 1329), Lady of Mechelen. Their children were:

- Marguerite (1320–1344), Lady of Mechelen
- Mathilde (1325–1384), Lady of Mechelen, then Duchess of Guelders (1371–1379), who married:
  1. in 1336, Godfried van Loon-Heinsberg (d. 1347)
  2. before 1348, John of Cleves (d. 1368), Count of Cleves
  3. John II, Count of Blois (d. 1381)
- Elisabeth (d. 1376), Abbess of Gravendaal
- Marie (d. 1405), Duchess of Guelders (1371–1405), married William II, Duke of Jülich

Widowed, Reginald married, at Nijmegen, May 1332, Eleanor of Woodstock (1318–1355), daughter of King Edward II. Their children were:

- Reinald III of Guelders (1333–1371), Duke of Guelders (1343–1361)
- Edward of Guelders (1336–1371), Duke of Guelders (1361–1371)

He excluded Eleanor from court in 1338, claiming she had leprosy, (Note: Ormrod suggests she was mentally unstable) she later became a nun after his death.

Reginald died at Arnhem after a fall from his horse.

== Sources ==
- Nijsten, Gerard (2004). In the Shadow of Burgundy: The Court of Guelders in the Late Middle Ages. Translated by Guest, Tanis. Cambridge University Press.
- Ormrod, W. Mark (2011). Edward III. Yale University Press.
- Packe, Michael (1985). Edward III. Routledge, Kegan Paul.
- Sumption, Jonathan (1990). Trial by Battle: The Hundred Years War I. University of Pennsylvania Press.

== Notes ==
Preceded by Reginald I	Count of Guelders since 1339 Duke of Guelders; 1318–1343	Succeeded by Reginald III
