= Siege of Venlo (1511) =

1511 conflict during the Guelders Wars

- Part of the Guelders Wars
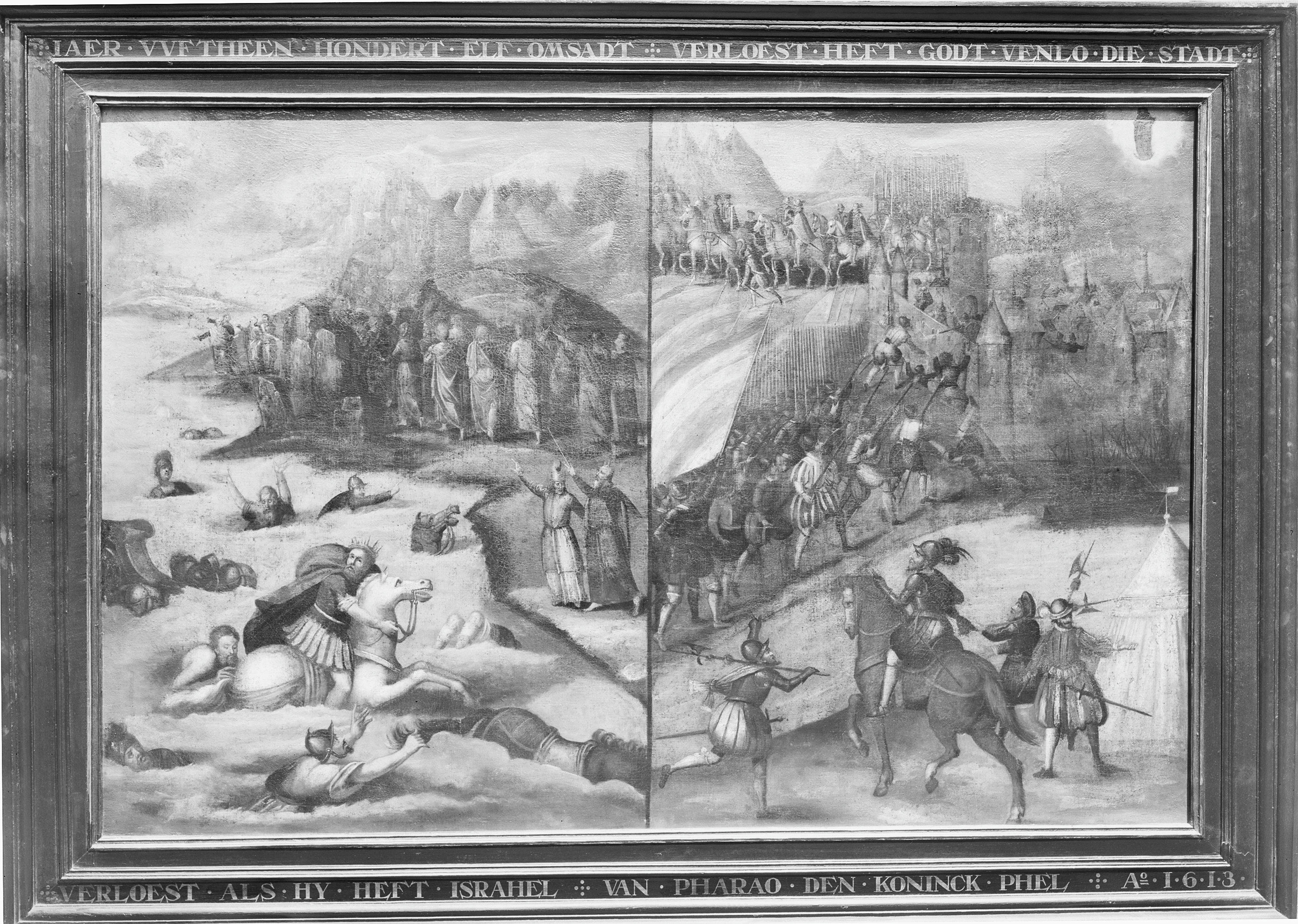
- Depiction of the sieges of Venlo in 1511, 1597 and 1606, with the one of 1511 being the one on the right
Date	October - November, 1511
Location	Venlo, Upper Guelders, Duchy of Guelders
Result	Guelderian victory

Belligerents
Habsburg Monarchy; Kingdom of England	Duchy of Guelders

Commanders and leaders
Emperor Maximilian I Henry VIII of England	Charles of Guelders

Strength
1,500 Germans; 1,500 English	Unknown

The siege of Venlo occurred in 1511 when a combined Habsburg and English force besieged Venlo in an attempt to capture the city and bring the Duchy of Guelders to its knees.

== Siege ==
The siege was initiated in October, this was due to the strategic position of Upper Guelders and its role in trade. Although Roermond was the capital of Upper Guelders, Venlo was the most important city for trade purposes, and capturing the city would be vital for trade.

Margaret of Austria arrived before the city, and appointed Henry III of Nassau-Breda and Philip of Burgundy as commanders of the siege, but gave their roles up due to sickness. Afterwards, Floris van Egmont was appointed as siege commander of the German forces, and Eduard Poining commanded the English forces. Because of their different languages, it meant that the communication did not go well and the siege would result in a failure because of that.

The city was bombarded for days straight with catapults and had 3 separate assaults. During one of the assaults, the attackers managed to breach the defense walls, and went inside. Once they were inside they were met with the leader of the garrison, Schwartzenberg who with a cavalry contingent managed to drive them back to the lichtenberg tower. During the action, a part of the Anglo-German army fell down a big pit which had been dug by the inhabitants.
