= Zennewijnen =

- Hamlet
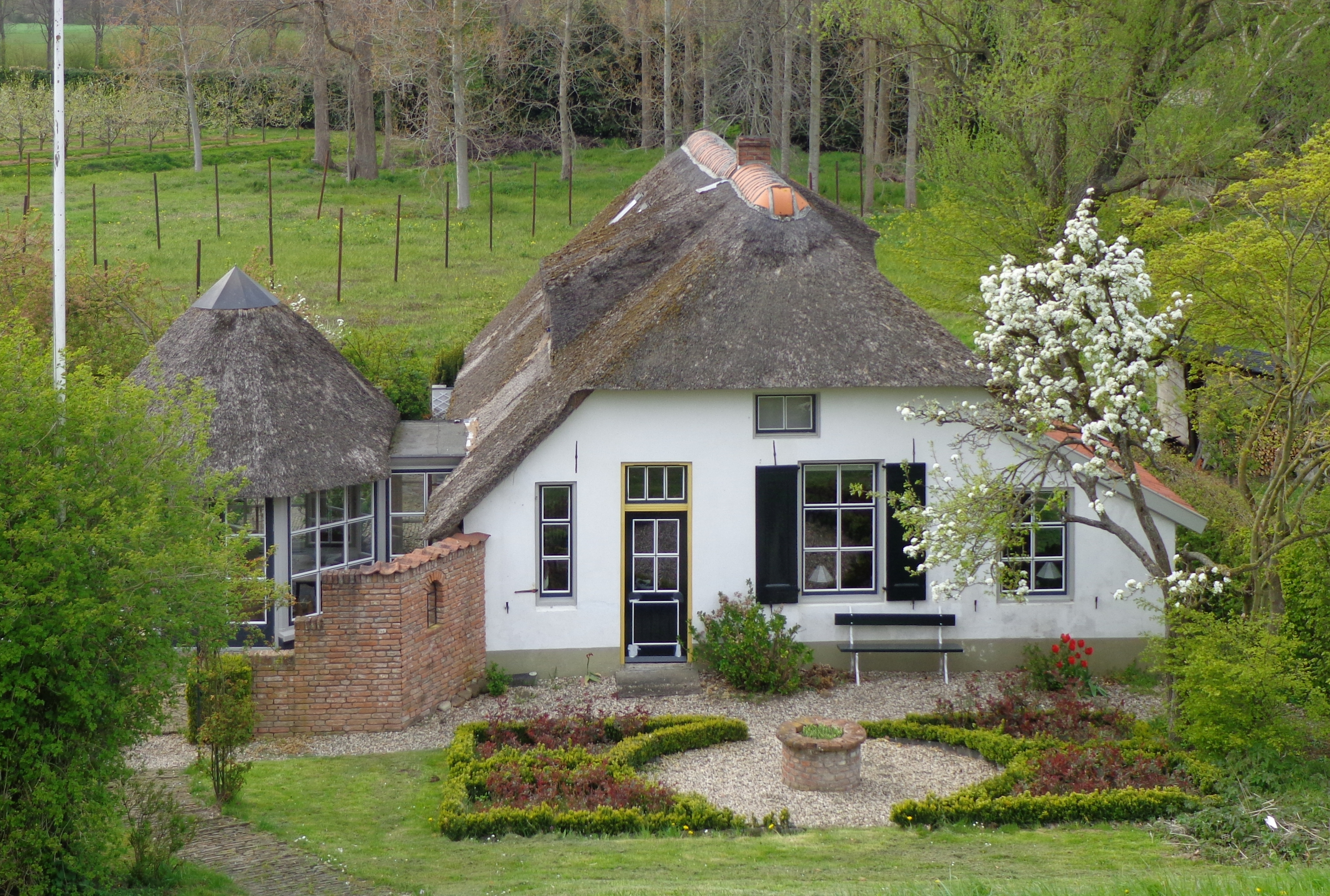
- Farm in Zennewijnen

- Location in the Netherlands Zennewijnen (Netherlands)
- Coordinates: 51°51′32″N 5°24′35″E
- Country: Netherlands
- Province: Gelderland
- Municipality: Tiel

Area
  - Total: 2.90 km^{2} (1.12 sq mi)
- Elevation: 6 m (20 ft)

Population
  - Total: 145
  - Density: 50.0/km^{2} (129/sq mi)
- Time zone: UTC+1 (CET)
  - Summer (DST): UTC+2 (CEST)
- Postal code: 4062
- Dialing code: 0344

Zennewijnen is a hamlet in the Dutch province of Gelderland. It is a part of the municipality of Tiel, and lies about 3 km (1.9 mi) south of Tiel.

It was first mentioned in 850 as Sinuinum. The etymology in unclear. The Premonstratensian monastery Mariënschoot was located near Zennewijnen since the 13th century and a site for pilgrimage. In 1372, the monastery burnt down and was demolished in 1572. In 1840, it was home to 171 people. There is a still a brickworks in Zennewijnen.

== Gallery ==
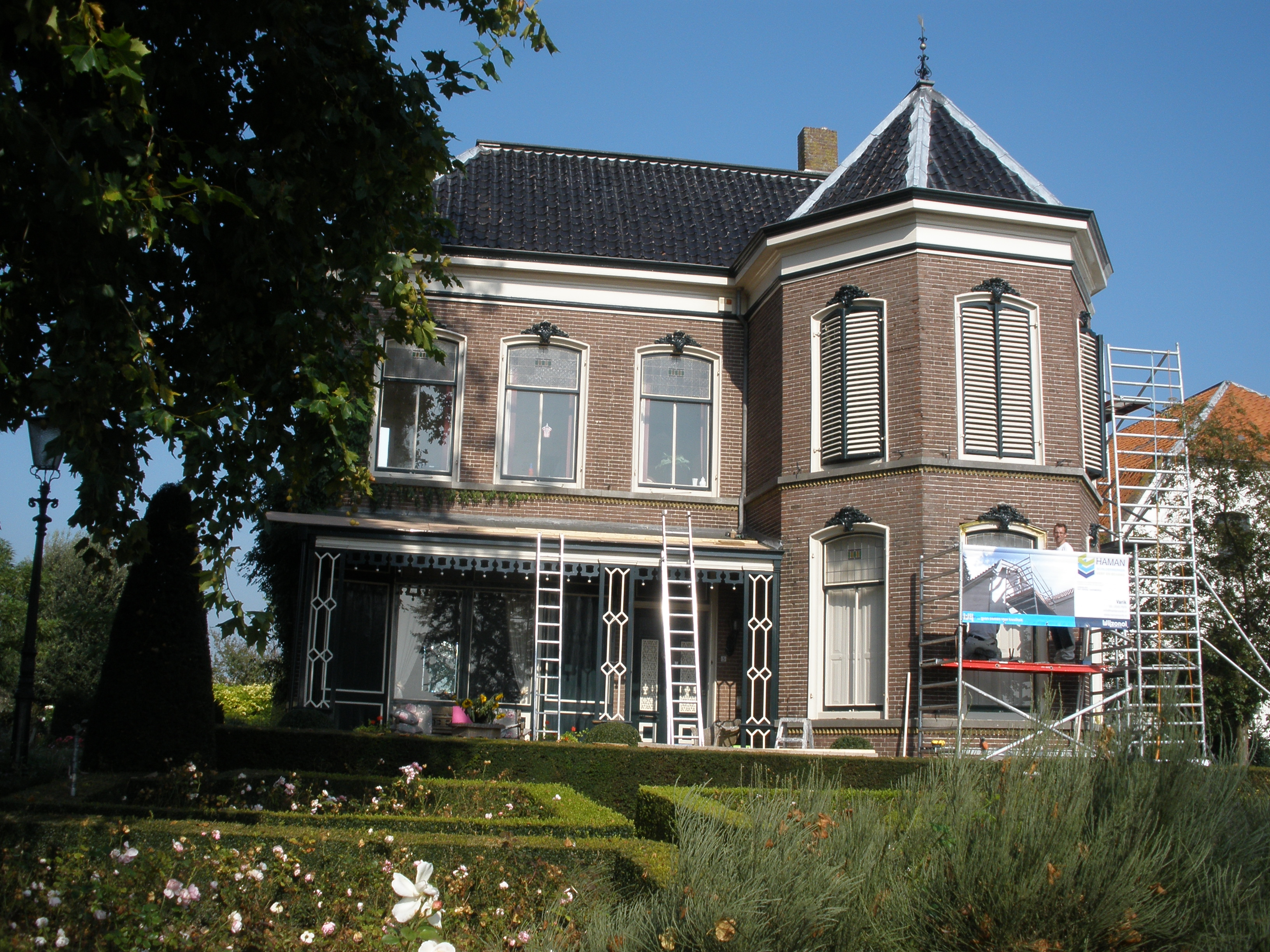
Villa in Zennwijnen

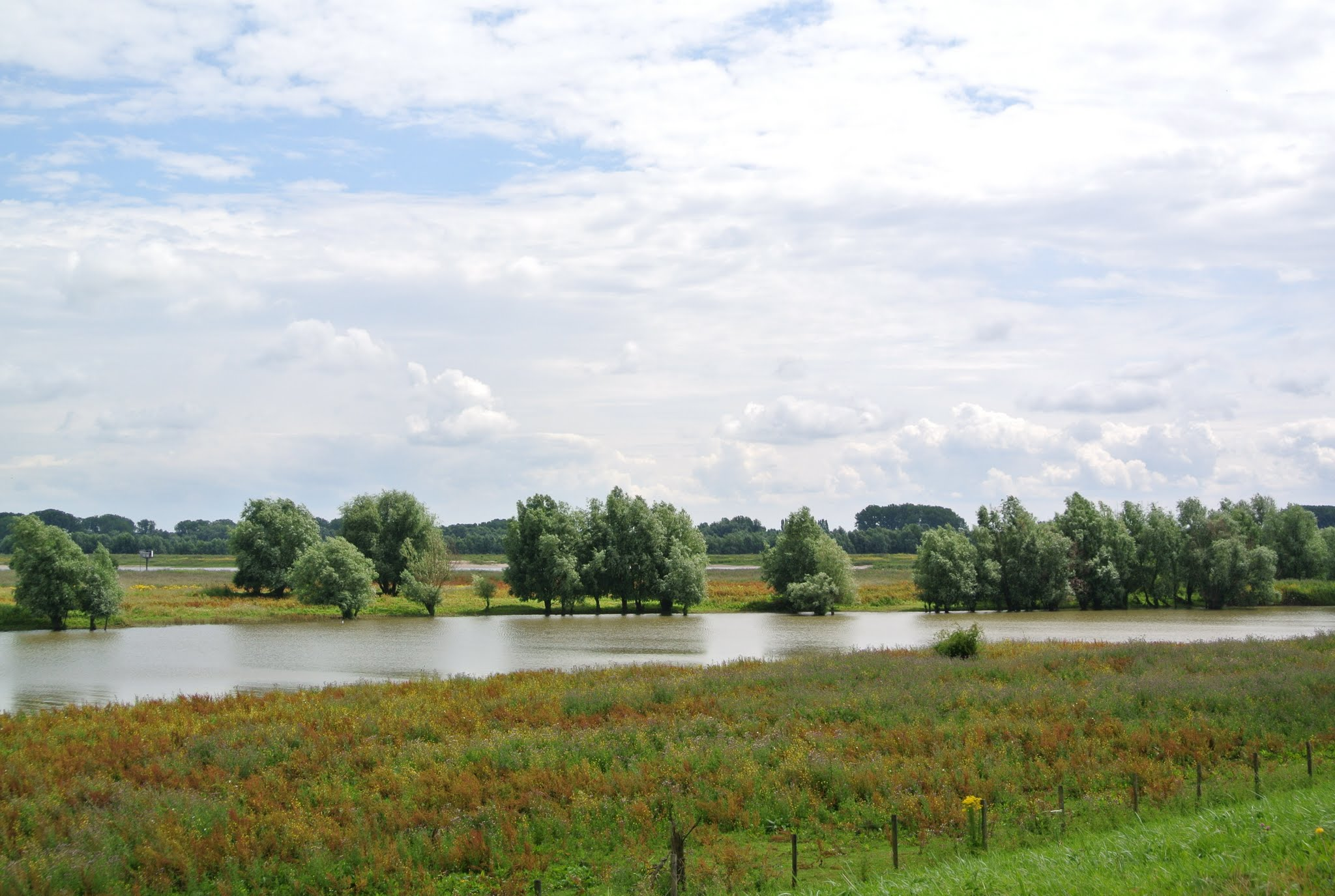
Country side

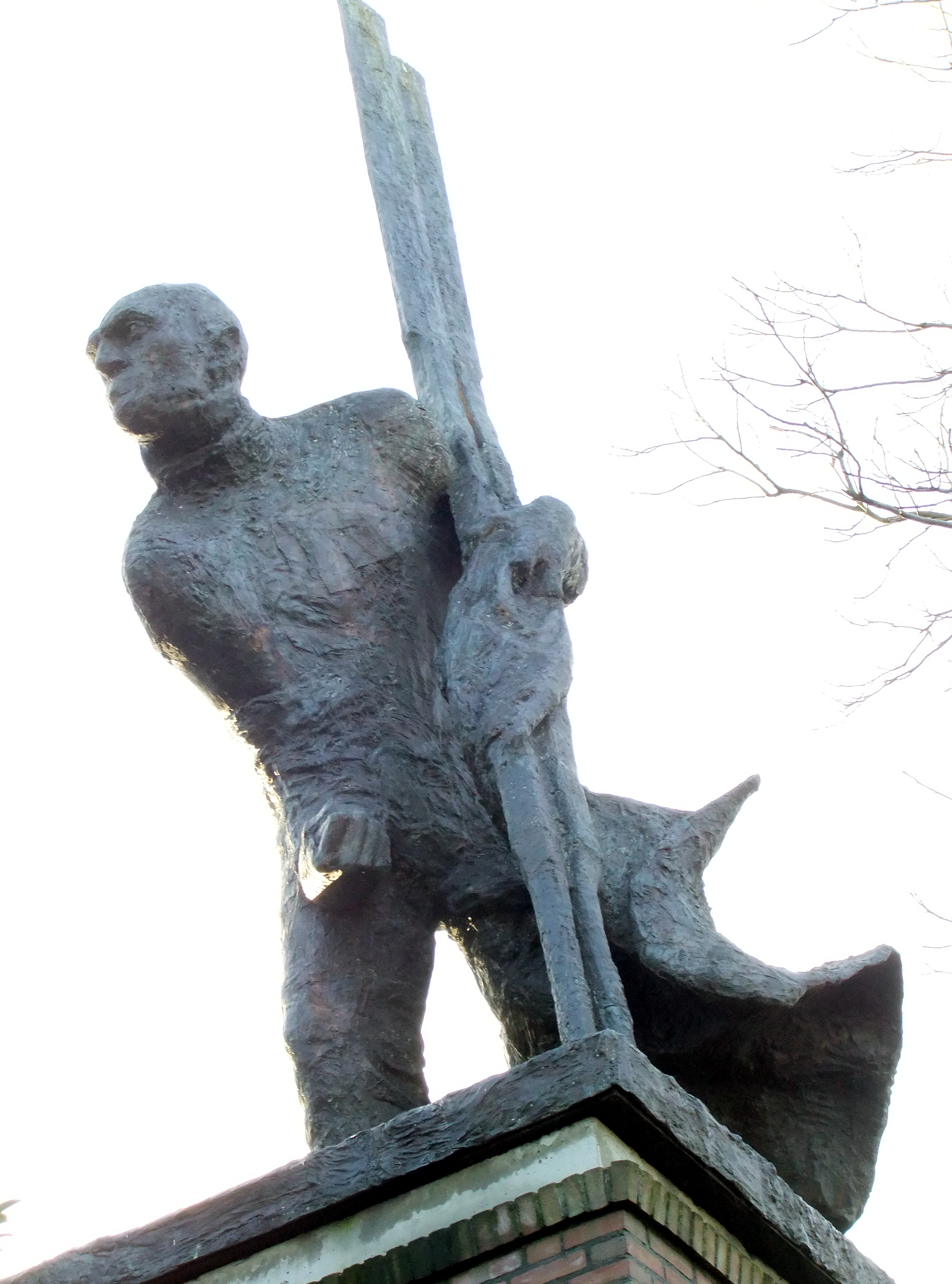
The rower statue by Willem den Ouden
