= Count of Zutphen =

Rulers

The title of Count of Zutphen historically belonged to the ruler of the Dutch province of Gelderland (Zutphen being one of the major cities in the province during the medieval period). The lordship was a vassal title before it eventually became a county itself.

The line of the Counts of Zutphen became extinct in the 12th century and the title passed again onto the rulers of Guelders, who eventually sold its titles to the duke of Burgundy. After the Guelders Wars, both Guelders and Zupthen ended as part of the Spanish Netherlands until Gelderland became one of the provinces to revolt and form the United Provinces.

== Lords of Zutphen ==
The House of Zutphen comes into existence in 1018 when Otto of Hammerstein became the first Lord of Zutphen. In 1046 Emperor Henry III gave Zutphen to Bishop Bernold of Utrecht. The Lords of Zutphen did not recognize this gift, which lead to some confusion regarding who actually owned Zutphen.

- 920 – 998/1001: Megingoz of Guelders († ap. 998/1001)
  Married Gerberga of Lorraine
- 1002-1025: Otto of Hammerstein († 1036), count of Hamaland, son of Herbert and Ermentrude, daughter of Megingoz and Gerberge
  married to Ermengarde of Verdun
- 1025-1031: Liudolf of Lotharingia († 1031)
  married in 1025 to Mathilde of Hammerstein, daughter of Otto I
- 1031-1033: Henri I of Zutphen († 1118), son of Liudolf
- 1033-1042: Conrad († 1055), Duke of Bavaria as Conrad II from 1049 to 1053, son of Liudolf
  married to Judith of Schweinfurt († 1106)
- 1042-1044: Gothelo I, brother of Ermengarde of Verdun.
- 1044-1046: Godfrey, son of Gothelo
- 1046-1063: Godschalk of Zutphen († 1063)
  married to Adelheid, sister of Conrad
- 1062-1101: Otto II the Rich († 1113), son of the former. In 1101 he was elevated to Count of Zutphen.

== Counts of Zutphen ==
- 1101-1113: Otto II the Rich († 1113) Made Count of Zutphen in 1101
  married Judith of Arnstein
- 1113-1127: Henri II the elder († 1127), son of the former
- 1127-1138: Ermengarde († 1138), sister of the former, married:
1. Gerard II († 1131), count of Guelders and of Wassenberg
2. Conrad II († 1136), count of Luxembourg
- 1138-1182: Henry III († 1182), count of Guelders and of Zutphen

== Sources ==
- Genealogy of the count of Zutphen (in Dutch)
