= Eleanor of Woodstock =

Duchess of Guelders from 1332 to 1343

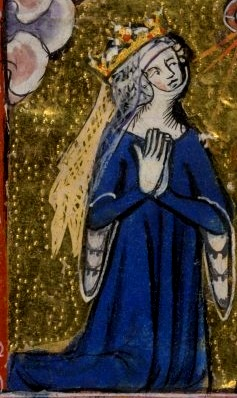
- A "portrait" probably representing Eleanor at prayer, in the illustration for the Hours of the Holy Spirit in the Taymouth Hours (London, BL MS Yates Thompson 13, fol. 18r)

Duchess consort of Guelders
- Tenure: 1332 – 12 October 1343
- Born: 18 June 1318; Woodstock, Oxfordshire
- Died: 22 April 1355 (aged 36)
- Burial: Deventer Abbey, Salland
- Spouse: Reginald II, Duke of Guelders (m. 1332; died 1343)
- Issue: Reginald III, Duke of Guelders; Edward, Duke of Guelders
- House: Plantagenet
- Father: Edward II of England
- Mother: Isabella of France

Eleanor of Woodstock (18 June 1318 – 22 April 1355) was an English princess and the duchess of Guelders and countess of Zutphen by marriage to Reginald II of Guelders. She was regent as the guardian of their minor son Reginald III from 1343 until 1344. She was a younger sister of Edward III of England.

== Early life ==
Eleanor was born on 18 June 1318, at Woodstock Palace in Oxfordshire to King Edward II of England and Isabella of France. Eleanor was named after her paternal grandmother, Eleanor of Castile. £333 was given for her churching by her father. In 1324 she was taken into care by her cousin Eleanor de Clare then sent to the care of Ralph de Monthermer and Isabella Hastings with her younger sister Joan of the Tower at Pleshey. In 1325, there were negotiations between England and Castile for Eleanor to be betrothed to Alphonso XI of Castile, but this fell through due to the dowry.

In early 1328 Eleanor's new sister-in-law, Philippa of Hainaut, wife of Edward III, became Eleanor's guardian. In 1329, during the minority government, negotiations were underway for a match between Eleanor and the future John II of France; the following year the prospective bridegroom was Peter, son of Alfonso IV of Aragon, but these negotiations fell through also.

== Duchess of Guelders ==
In May 1332 Eleanor married the count of Guelders and Zutphen, Reinoud II "the black" (English: Reginald), of the House of Wassenberg (born c. 1287), a marriage arranged by her brother, Edward III, and her mother's cousin Joan of Valois. The groom, quite dark of colour and according to chronicles, also of character, was a widower with four daughters. He was known for, among other things, having imprisoned his father for over six years.

As Eleanor sailed from Sandwich, her wedding trousseau included a wedding gown of Spanish cloth, caps, gloves, shoes, a bed, rare spices and loaves of sugar. She was well received in Guelders.

According to legend, she was sent from court in 1338 under the pretext that she had leprosy. Her husband was reportedly under the influence of the priest Jan Moliart, who had been active in her exile and the false pretense of her alleged leprosy. During her supposed exile, she is said to have stayed in Deventer; she does appear to have been active as the protector of the Franciscan Friars, and a financier of their new church.

Again according to legend, her husband tried to annul the marriage. Although there is no firm evidence to support this story, which finds parallels in the legends surrounding numerous other royal women, Eleanor turned up in Court in Nijmegen to contest the annulment, and proceeded to strip down, proving she was no leper, and thus forcing her husband to take her back. He died from a fall from his horse on 12 October 1343.

== Regency ==
Following her husband's death, Eleanor became the regent of Guelders for her nine-year-old son Reginald. Having assumed power, she had her old enemy Jan Moliart arrested and imprisoned. Her regency was formally recognised, but she was forced to confront a relative of her late husband, Jan van Valkenburg, who demanded his right to share the regency with her. The situation was soon so difficult that, according to some accounts, she was forced to resign her post of regency, and her son was formally declared of legal majority and therefore of no need of a regency at the age of eleven in 1344.

After her resignation she formally retired under the title Lady of Veluwe (after the name of her dowry), and spent much of her time acting as a benefactor of convents, particular the beggar convents such as the Order of Saint Clare.

During the 1350s, she and Reginald came in conflict over making peace with his younger brother Edward, and he confiscated her lands.

== Death and burial ==
On 22 April 1355, twelve years after she became a widow, Eleanor died at age 36. According to legend, she had been too proud to ask her brother Edward III for help and was buried in the Franciscan church in Deventer. Her tombstone had the simple inscription ELEANOR on it; however, in England, on the south side of Philippa of Hainault's tomb in Westminster Abbey there is an image of her and her husband.

== Issue ==
Eleanor had two sons:

- Reginald III, Duke of Guelders, called "The Fat" (1333–1371)
- Edward, Duke of Guelders (1336–1371)

== Ancestry ==
Ancestors of Eleanor of Woodstock

8. Henry III of England
4. Edward I of England
9. Eleanor of Provence
2. Edward II of England
10. Ferdinand III of Castile
5. Eleanor of Castile
11. Jeanne of Dammartin
1. Eleanor of Woodstock
12. Philip III of France
6. Philip IV of France
13. Isabella of Aragon
3. Isabella of France
14. Henry I of Navarre
7. Joan I of Navarre
15. Blanche of Artois

== Sources ==
- Chamberlin, Cynthia L. (2007). "A Castilian in King Edward's Court: The Career of Giles Despagne, 1313-27". In Bullòn-Fernandez, Maria (ed.). England and Iberia in the Middle Ages, 12th-15th Century. Palgrave Macmillan. pp. 89–118.
- Haines, Roy Martin (2003). King Edward II: His Life, His Reign, and Its Aftermath, 1284-1330. McGill-Queen's University Press.
- Maclagan, Michael; Louda, Jiří (1999). Line of Succession: Heraldry of the Royal Families of Europe. Little, Brown & Co. ISBN 1-85605-469-1.
- Nijsten, Gerard (2004). In the Shadow of Burgundy: The Court of Guelders in the Late Middle Ages. Cambridge University Press.
- Smith, Kathryn A. (2012). The Taymouth Hours: Stories and the Construction of the Self in Late Medieval England. The British Library.
- Stanton, Anne Rudloff (2011). "Turning the Pages: Marginal Narratives and Devotional Practice in Gothic Prayerbooks". In Blick, Sarah; Gelfand, Laura (eds.). Push Me, Pull You: Imaginative, Emotional, Physical, and Spatial Interaction in Late Medieval and Renaissance Art. Brill. pp. 75–121.
- St John, Lisa Benz (2014). "In the best Interests of the Queen: Isabella of France, Edward II and the Image of a Functional Relationship". In Hamilton, J. S. (ed.). Fourteenth Century England VIII. The Boydell Press.
- Warner, Kathryn (2014). Edward II: The Unconventional King. Amberley Publishing.
- Warner, Kathryn (2016). Isabella of France: The Rebel Queen. Amberley Publishing.
- Warner, Kathryn (2018). Blood Roses: The Houses of Lancaster and York before the Wars of the Roses. Amberley Publishing.
