= Goswin I of Heinsberg =

German noble

Goswin I of Heinsberg (Goswin I von Heinsberg) (ca. 1060–1128) was the Count of Heinsberg from 1085–1128. He was (most-possibly) the father of Goswin II of Heinsberg. He reigned since an unknown period with his brother Gerhard I of Heinsberg (who reigned until 1128 or 1129). His wife was Oda von Walbeck. He died in 1128 and was succeeded by Goswin II of Heinsberg.
