= Margaret of Flanders, Countess of Guelders =

13th-14th century Flemish noblewoman

Margaret of Flanders
- Spouse: Alexander, Prince of Scotland (m. 1282; died 1284) Reinauld I, Count of Guelders (m. 1286; died 1326)
- Issue: Reginald II, Duke of Guelders; Margaret; Guy; Philippe; Elisabeth; Philippa
- House: Dampierre
- Father: Guy, Count of Flanders
- Mother: Isabelle of Luxembourg

Margaret of Flanders (died 1331) was a consort of Alexander, Prince of Scotland and later wife of Reinauld I, Count of Guelders.

She was the daughter of Guy, Count of Flanders and his second wife Isabelle of Luxembourg. In 1281, King Alexander III of Scotland started negotiating with the Count of Flanders, about the marriage of the Count's daughter Margaret to the Prince Alexander. The couple were married on 14 November 1282 at Roxburgh, Scotland and the marriage was celebrated the following day. Prince Alexander died a week after his twentieth birthday, on 28 January 1284. Margaret returned to Flanders early in 1285.

On 3 July 1286, Margaret was married to Reinauld I, Count of Guelders, in Namur, Wallonia. They had six children, Reginald II, Margaret, Guy, Philippe, Elisabeth and Philippa.

== Bibliography ==
- Barrow, G. W. S. (1990). "A Kingdom in Crisis: Scotland and the Maid of Norway". The Scottish Historical Review. 69 (188): 120–41. JSTOR 25530459.
- Duncan, Archibald Alexander McBeth (2002). The Kingship of the Scots, 842-1292: Succession and Independence. Edinburgh University Press. ISBN 0748616268.
- Fegley, Randall (2002). The Golden Spurs of Kortrijk: How the Knights of France Fell to the Foot Soldiers of Flanders in 1302. McFarland & Co. ISBN 0786480548 – via Internet Archive.
