= Gerard II of Guelders =

Gerard II was Count of Guelders from March 1129 until his death on October 24, 1131. He was the son of Gerard I, Count of Guelders.

Around 1116, Gerard married Ermgard of Zutphen, daughter of Otto II, Count of Zutphen and Judith of Arnstein. They had two children:

- Henry I, Count of Guelders married Agnes of Arnstein, daughter of count Louis III of Arnstein.
- Salome of Guelders, married Henry I, Count of Wildeshausen.

Preceded by Gerard I	Count of Guelders; 1129–1131	Succeeded by Henry I
