= Edward, Duke of Guelders =

14th-century Duke of Guelders

Edward (12 March 1336 – 24 August 1371) was the duke of Guelders and count of Zutphen from 1361 until 1371. After his brother Reginald became Duke of Guelders in 1343, the 14-year-old Edward and his Bronckhorst allies launched a princely rebellion in 1350 against Reginald and their Heeckeren rivals, culminating in the battle at Tiel, capturing his brother in 1361. Edward became Duke of Guelders, but in a dispute with Wenceslaus I of Luxembourg was killed at the battle of Baesweiler in 1371. His imprisoned brother Reginald was released, and reinstated as duke of Guelders.

== Life ==
Edward was the youngest son of Duke Reginald II of Guelders and his second wife, Eleanor of Woodstock, daughter of King Edward II of England.

In 1350, with encouragement from his mother, Edward began a devastating rebellion against his brother Reginald III for control of the Duchy of Guelders. Edward led the Bronkhorster (urban) faction which in 1361 in a battle at Tiel defeated the Heekeren (aristocratic) faction, led by Edward's incapable brother who was captured and imprisoned. Edward governed well and powerfully, despite the conditions against him. He allied himself with the bishops of Lüttich and with Jülich and Kleve. In 1371, his brother-in-law and supporter, Duke William II of Jülich, got into a dispute with Duke Wenceslaus I of Luxembourg. The dispute culminated in the Battle of Baesweiler in which William defeated Wenceslaus, but Edward was mortally wounded in the battle and died on 24 August 1371. He is buried in the Kloster Graefenthal. Upon Edward's death, his brother Reginald III regained the Duchy of Guelders but died shortly afterwards, on 4 December 1371.

Edward was betrothed in 1368 to Katherine of Bavaria, daughter of Albert I, Duke of Bavaria and Margaret of Brieg. Edward died when Katharine was only 10 years old and she subsequently married in 1379 to Edward's nephew, William of Jülich.

As neither Edward nor Reginald had children, another war of succession for Guelders began, with the Bronkhorster faction supporting Edward and Reginald's half-sister Maria, wife of William II of Jülich, and the Heerkeren faction supporting their half-sister Mathilde, wife of Count John II of Blois. In 1377, Emperor Charles IV awarded the Duchy of Guelders and the County of Zutphen to Maria's son William of Jülich. After her total defeat in the Battle of Hönnepel on 24 March 1379, Mathilde renounced her claim to Guelders and Zutphen.

== Sources ==
- Boffa, Sergio (2010). "Low Countries:Narrative". In Rogers, Clifford J. (ed.). The Oxford Encyclopedia of Medieval Warfare and Military Technology. Vol. 2. Oxford University Press. pp. 540–549.
- Nijsten, Gerard (2004). In the Shadow of Burgundy: The Court of Guelders in the Late Middle Ages. Cambridge University Press.

Preceded by Reginald III	Duke of Guelders; 1361–1371	Succeeded by Reginald III
