= Henry of Guelders =

Henry (Hendrik, 1117–1182) was count of Guelders from 1131 until 1182. He was a son of Gerard II of Guelders and Ermengarde of Zutphen.

In 1138 Hendrik inherited the County of Zutphen from his mother.

Hendrik was under tremendous pressure from the Bishopric of Utrecht and the County of Holland, and was forced by Holland to negotiate a treaty with the city of Utrecht; this led to a problematic relation with the Bishop of Utrecht.

In 1135 Hendrik married Agnes of Arnstein, daughter of count Louis III of Arnstein. Their daughter Adelaide married Gérard II, Count of Looz. Hendrik died in 1182 and was succeeded by his son Otto I of Guelders. He is buried at Kloosterkamp, probably the prestigious Cistercian abbey of Kloster Kamp. He had a daughter named Margareta of Guelders who married Engelbert I of Berg.

Preceded by Gerard II	Count of Guelders; 1131–1182	Succeeded by Otto I
