= Battle of Baesweiler =

1371 battle in Europe

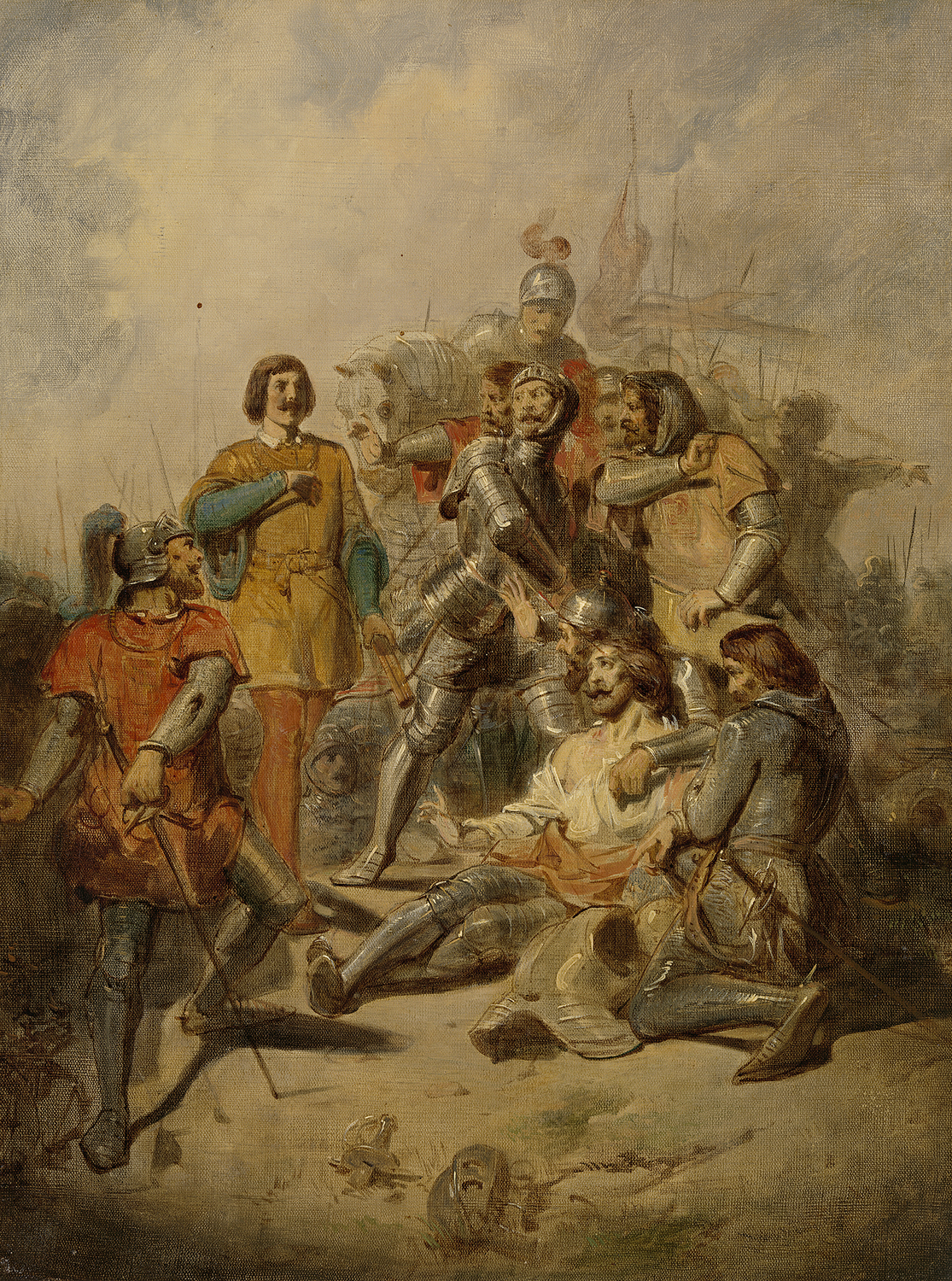
- Johannes Hinderikus Egenberger: Death of Eduard van Gelre in the battle of Baesweiler (19th century)
| Date | 22 August 1371 |
| Location | Baesweiler, Aachen (district) |
| Result | Victory for Jülich and Guelders |

Belligerents
| Duchy of Jülich; Duchy of Guelders | Duchy of Luxembourg; Duchy of Brabant; County of Namur; County of Ligny |

Commanders and leaders
| William II of Jülich; Edward of Guelders † | Wenceslaus of Luxembourg (POW); William of Namur (POW); Guy of Luxembourg-Ligny † |

Strength
| 1,000 lances 600 men-at-arms | 2,500 men-at-arms |

The Battle of Baesweiler (22 August 1371) was a conflict between the duke of Luxembourg-Brabant and the Duke of Jülich.

== Background ==
Attacks on Brabant's commercial interests in the territory of the Duke of Jülich had almost caused war in November 1367 and September 1369. Peace was only maintained by the involvement of the Landfrieden. After mercenaries robbed a number of Brabantine merchants on the territory of William II, Duke of Jülich in 1371, William refused to pay reparation to Wenceslaus I of Luxembourg, the Duke of Brabant, let alone punish the mercenaries, instead protecting them and even hiring some. As Wenceslas prepared his forces, William sought help from his brother-in-law, Edward, Duke of Guelders.

== Battle ==
On 20 August, Wenceslas led his army of 2,500 from the border town of Maastricht towards the enemy capital of Jülich. The army advanced slowly, burning and looting as it went and by the evening of 21 August was encamped near the town of Baesweiler north of Aachen. On 22 August, Wenceslas' army was confronted by the smaller force of William, Duke of Jülich which consisted of 1,600 troops. Two different versions of what happened next are recorded. In one, the army of Jülich attacked in the morning while the Brabant forces were at mass. In the other, the army of Brabant had the best of the fighting until the late appearance of the troops of Edward, Duke of Guelders, perhaps from ambush.

The battle ended with the capture of the Wenceslas, Duke of Brabant, and William, Margrave of Namur, and the death of the Edward of Guelders. Guy I of Luxembourg, Count of Ligny, a distant relative of the Wenceslas, was also killed. Wenceslas was incarcerated at Nideggen at Roer.

== Sources ==
- Boffa, Sergio (2004). Warfare in Medieval Brabant. Woodbridge, Suffolk: Boydell & Brewer. ISBN 1843830612.
- Boffa, Sergio (2010). "Low Countries:Narrative". In Rogers, Clifford J. (ed.). The Oxford Encyclopedia of Medieval Warfare and Military Technology. Vol. 2. Oxford University Press. pp. 540–549.
- Nijsten, Gerard (2004). In the Shadow of Burgundy: The Court of Guelders in the Late Middle Ages. Translated by Guest, Tanis. Cambridge University Press.

== See also ==
- Slag bij Baesweiler
- Chronicle "Brabantsche Yeesten" in medieval Dutch
