= Landry, Count of Nevers =

Landry, Count of Nevers (970–1028) was the first hereditary Count of Nevers from 989 to 1028.

== Biography ==
Landry was the son of Bodon, lord of Monceaux-le-Comte and builder of Monceaux Castle. Around 990, Landry was granted the County of Nevers by his father-in-law Count Otto-William of Burgundy who until then administered Nivernais. This transfer was carried out with the consent of Duke Henry I of Burgundy and King Hugh Capet of France.

Landry was remembered for being generous to the Abbeys of Saint-Germain d'Auxerre, Flavigny, and Cluny, and his castle was open to the pilgrims on the way to Rome, both rich and poor.

In 993, Landry of Nevers gathered evidence to indict Bishop Ascelin of Laon of plotting treason against the Capetian Kings. The latter is said to have plotted with Emperor Otto III and Count Odo I of Blois to put the Kingdom of France under Imperial jurisdiction. After a lengthy trial, Ascelin was pardoned and Landry was rewarded with the position of Seneschal of France by Hugh Capet and Prince Robert.

Upon the death of Duke Henry I of Burgundy in 1002 without issue, a war of succession between his adopted son Count Otto-William of Burgundy and his nephew King Robert II started. Landry supported his father-in-law and occupied Auxerre. Robert II appealed to Duke Richard II of Normandy who sent 30,000 soldiers. After two unsuccessful sieges of Auxerre and the surrounding area, Robert II agreed to peace with Landry in 1005.

In 1023, Landry attended a peace council held by the Archbishop of Sens with the purpose of reconciling the King and Count Odo II of Blois over a land dispute of Burgundy and Champagne.

Landry died at the Château de Courdon in 1028.

== Marriage and issue ==
From his first marriage to an unknown woman he had three children:

- Bodon of Nevers ( before 995 – 1023) Count of Vendôme by marriage to Adèle d'Anjou, daughter of Fulk III of Anjou.
- Landry of Nevers (born 1002)
- Robert of Nevers (died 1032)

From his marriage with Matilda of Burgundy (983–1005) daughter of Otto-William, Count of Burgundy he had three children:

- Count Renaud I of Nevers (died 1040) He married Adwisa of France, daughter of King Robert II the Pious.
- Guy "the Little" of Burgundy (died after 1032)
- Mathilde (died 1005)
