= Ermengarde of Tonnerre =

Ermengarde (c. 1032 – 1083), daughter of Renauld, Count of Tonnerre and Herviz, married William I, Count of Nevers in 1045. She had six children:

1. Ermengarde (born 1050, date of death unknown), married Hubert I, Count of Beaumont
2. Robert (1052 – February 12, 1095), later Bishop of Auxerre
3. William II (1052–1090), inherited grandfather's title as Count of Tonnerre
4. Heloise (born 1056, date of death unknown), married William, Count of Évreux
5. Sibille (1058–1078), married Hugh I, Duke of Burgundy
6. Renauld II (1059–1089), inherited father's title as Count of Nevers.

Her husband William I was the son of Renauld I, Count of Nevers and Hedwig/Advisa of Auxerre, daughter of Robert II of France.
