= Hugh the Great (disambiguation) =

Hugh the Great (c.898–956) was Duke of the Franks and father of king Hugh Capet.

Hugh the Great or Hugh Magnus may also refer to:

- Hugh, Margrave of Tuscany (950–1001), margrave of Tuscany and duke of Spoleto
- Hugh of France (1007–1025), son and co-king of Robert II who predeceased his father
- Hugh of Cluny (1024–1109), saint
- Hugh, Count of Vermandois (1053–1101), son of Henry I of France and one of the leaders of the First Crusade
- Hugh III of Cyprus (1235–1284), king of Cyprus and Jerusalem
