= Arnulf (archbishop of Reims) =

French archbishop of Reims (died 1021)

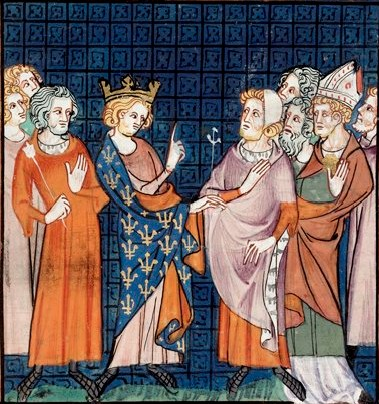
Arnulf at the Council of Reims, 991

Arnulf (also Arnulph or Arnoul) was the illegitimate son of King Lothair of France. He became archbishop of Reims.

== Biography ==
Arnulf belonged to the Carolingian dynasty, the rule of which in France ended when Arnulf's half-brother, Louis V, died childless. Hugh Capet was elected to succeed him as king. King Hugh made Arnulf archbishop of Reims in March 989, against the will of the previous archbishop, Adalberon, who had wanted to be succeeded by Gerbert of Aurillac. In September, Arnulf supported an attempt to place his uncle Charles, Duke of Lower Lorraine, on the French throne. Charles briefly held Rheims and Laon. In 990, Arnulf refused to attend a synod at Senlis and he and Charles were imprisoned on 29 March.

In June 991 Archbishop Seguin of Sens presided over a Council of Reims in the Basilica of Saint Basle, which deposed Arnulf for alleged high treason, in favour of Gerbert. This deposition was much opposed, however. Pope John XV sent Leo, abbot of Saints Boniface and Alexius at Rome, as legate to preside over a synod at Mouzon on 2 June 995. Gerbert was suspended from the episcopum. A second synod, held on 1 July, declared the whole process of deposition and elevation to be illegal and invalid. Thus, Arnulf was reinstated.

Arnulf crowned Hugh Magnus, the son of Hugh Capet's successor, Robert II, as co-king in the Capetian tradition in 1017. At this time, any resistance to the new dynasty had died in him. He held the see until his death in 1021, then the only direct male line descendant of the Carolingian family in the eldest living branch aside from his first cousin Louis, who died two years later.

Catholic Church titles
Preceded by Adalberon	Archbishop of Reims; 988–991	Succeeded by Gerbert of Aurillac
Preceded by Gerbert of Aurillac	Archbishop of Reims; 996–1021	Succeeded by Ebles I of Roucy
