= Louis of Lorraine =

Louis of Lorraine (Louis de Lorraine) may refer to:

- Louis of Lower Lorraine (980–1012)
- Louis, Count of Vaudémont (1500–1528)
- Louis I, Cardinal of Guise (1527–1578)
- Louis II, Cardinal of Guise (1555–1588)
- Louis III, Cardinal of Guise (1575–1621)
- Louis Joseph de Lorraine, Duke of Guise (1650–1671)
- Louis, Count of Armagnac (1641–1718)
- Louis, Duke of Joyeuse (1662–1654)
- Louis, Prince of Lambesc (1692–1743)
- Louis, Prince of Brionne (1725–1761)
