= Historia Francorum Senonensis =

The Historia Francorum Senonensis ("History of the Franks of Sens") is a short anonymous Latin chronicle of the Frankish kings from 688 down to 1015. It was written at Sens before 1034 and is hostile towards the Capetian dynasty that had taken the throne of West Francia in 987. It was a popular and widely used text, and its anti-Capetian view is largely responsible for the questions raised by many later authors concerning the dynasty's legitimacy.

The Historia is found in a single manuscript, now in the Vatican Library, BAV, regin. lat. 733A. This manuscript was probably copied in England in the twelfth century. Although it is the only full copy of the work on its own, much of the text of the Historia can be extracted from other works that borrowed liberally from it. At the Abbey of Fleury it was a source for the continuation of Aimon's Gesta Francorum and for the Historia Ecclesiastica of Hugh of Fleury. It was also mined by William of Jumièges for his Gesta Normannorum ducum, by Orderic Vitalis for his Historia Ecclesiastica and by the anonymous author of the Chronicon Sancti Petri Vivi.

The Historia has much in common with other historical works from Sens from the same era, such as the Chronicon Sancti Petri Vivi and the Chronicon of Odorannus. All may have made use of a lost set of annals from Sens, the Annales Senonenses, for the years up to 956. The anonymous author of the Historia may also have consulted the now lost Gesta Remensium episcoporum (Deeds of the Bishops of Reims).

Ferdinand Lot has written on the historical value of the Historia Francorum Senonensis, but the chronicle is most useful to historians for the light it sheds on a minority political view. In the view of the Historia, following the death of Louis V in 987 the legitimate monarch was his uncle, Charles, Duke of Lower Lorraine. The election of Hugh Capet was thus a rebellion against Charles.

Joachim Ehlers argues that the anti-Capetian bias of the work is not the result of pro-Carolingian legitimism but is connected the dispute between the archdiocese of Sens and the archdiocese of Reims over their roles in the coronation of the West Frankish kings. The Historia provides clear evidence of a political conception of the state as distinct from the dynasty or person of the monarch.

== Editions ==
- André Duchesne (1641). Historiae Francorum scriptores, III, pp. 349–54.
- Georg Waitz (1851). "Historia Francorum Senonensis, a. 688–1034", in MGH SS 9, Chronica et annales aevi Salici, pp. 364–69.
