= Robert II of France =

King of the Franks from 996 to 1031

Robert II
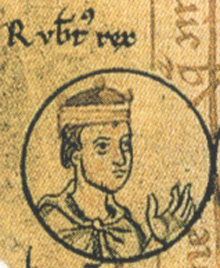
- Robert II in a French Chronicle

King of the Franks
- Reign: 24 October 996 – 20 July 1031
- Coronation: 25 December 987 (as co-king)
- Predecessor: Hugh Capet
- Successor: Henry I
- Co-king: Hugh (1017–1025)

Duke of Burgundy
- Reign: 1004 – 1016
- Predecessor: Otto-William
- Successor: Henry I
- Born: c. 972; Orléans, France
- Died: 20 July 1031 (aged 58–59); Melun, France
- Burial: Saint Denis Basilica, Paris, France
- Spouses: Rozala of Italy until 996 (m. 988, annulled) Bertha of Burgundy (m. 996; ann. 1001): Constance of Arles (m. 1001/03)
- Issue more...: Hedwig, Countess of Nevers; Hugh Magnus; Henry I, King of France; Adela, Countess of Flanders; Robert I, Duke of Burgundy
- House: House of Capet
- Father: Hugh Capet
- Mother: Adelaide of Aquitaine
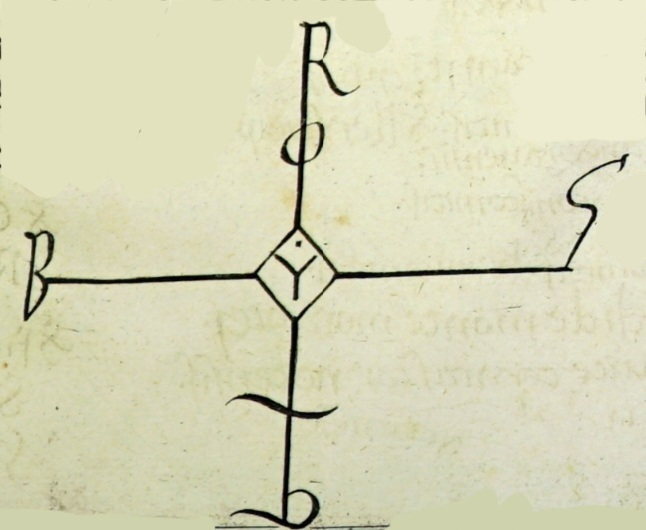
- Signature

Robert II (c. 972 – 20 July 1031), called the Pious (French: le Pieux) or the Wise (French: le Sage), was king of the Franks from 996 to 1031, the second from the Capetian dynasty. Crowned junior king in 987, he assisted his father on military matters (notably during the two sieges of Laon, in 988 and 991). His solid education, provided by Gerbert of Aurillac (the future Pope Sylvester II) in Reims, allowed him to deal with religious questions of which he quickly became the guarantor (he headed the Council of Saint-Basle de Verzy in 991 and that of Chelles in 994). Continuing the political work of his father after becoming sole ruler in 996, he managed to maintain the alliance with the Duchy of Normandy and the County of Anjou and thus was able to contain the ambitions of Count Odo II of Blois.

Robert II distinguished himself with an extraordinarily long reign for the time. His 35-year-long reign was marked by his attempts to expand the royal domain by any means, especially by his struggle to gain the Duchy of Burgundy (which ended in 1005 with his victory) after the death in 1002 without male descendants of his paternal uncle Duke Henry I, and after a war against Otto-William of Ivrea, Henry I's stepson adopted by him as his heir. His policies earned him many enemies, including three of his sons.

The marital setbacks of Robert II (he married three times, having two of these annulled and attempting to have the third annulled, prevented only by the pope's refusal to agree to a third annulment), strangely contrasted with the pious aura, bordering on holiness, which his biographer Helgaud of Fleury was willing to lend him in his work "Life of King Robert the Pious" (Epitoma vitæ regis Roberti pii). His life was then presented as a model to follow, made of innumerable pious donations to various religious establishments, of charity towards the poor and, above all, of gestures considered sacred, such as the healing of certain lepers. Robert II was the first sovereign considered to be a "miracle worker". The end of his reign revealed the relative weakness of the sovereign, who had to face the revolt of his third wife Constance and then of his own sons (Henry and Robert) between 1025 and 1031.

== Life ==
=== Youth and political formation ===
==== The only heir of the Duke of the Franks ====
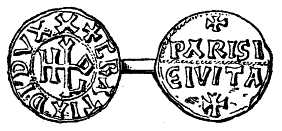
Denier of Hugh Capet, "Duke by the grace of God" (Dux Dei Gratia), Paris studio (Parisi Civita), late 10th century.

Robert II's exact date and birthplace are unknown, although historians have advocated for the year 972 and the city of Orléans (Note: The biographer Helgaud de Fleury claimed that Robert II was born in Orléans but at an unknown date. As he was about fifteen years old when he was associated to the throne by his father (in 987), his birth can be posited at around 972.) (the capital of the Robertians from the 9th century onward). The only son of Hugh Capet and Adelaide of Aquitaine, he was named after his heroic ancestor Robert the Strong, who had died fighting the Vikings in 866. His parents' marriage produced at least two other daughters: (Note: Hedwig and Gisela's parentage is confirmed by contemporary sources without any doubt; a number of other daughters are less reliably attested.) Hedwig (wife of Reginar IV, Count of Hainaut) and Gisela (wife of Hugh I, Count of Ponthieu).

In the 10th century, the Robertians were the most powerful aristocratic family in the Kingdom of France. In previous decades, two of its members, Odo (888) and Robert I (922), had ascended to the throne, displacing the ruling Carolingian dynasty. The principality of Hugh the Great, Duke of the Franks and Robert II's paternal grandfather, marked the apogee of the Robertians until his death in 956. In the middle of the 10th century, Hugh Capet succeeded as the head of the family.

Robert II's youth was especially marked by the incessant fights of King Lothair of France to recover Lorraine, the "cradle of the Carolingian family", at the expense of Emperor Otto II:

"As Otto possessed Belgium (Lorraine) and that Lothair sought to seize it, the two kings attempted against each other very treacherous machinations and coups de force, because both claimed that their fathers had possessed."

— Richer of Reims, ca. 991–998.

In August 978, King Lothair unexpectedly launched a general assault on Aix-la-Chapelle where the imperial family resided, which narrowly escaped capture. After having looted the imperial palace and the surroundings, he returned to France carrying the insignia of the Empire. In the following October, to take revenge, Otto II assembled an army of 60,000 men and invaded Lothair's domains. The latter, with only a few troops around him, was forced to take refuge with Hugh Capet, who was then said to be the savior of the Carolingian kingship. The Robertian dynasty then took a turn that changed the fate of young Robert II. Bishop Adalbero of Reims, originally a man of King Lothair, turns more and more towards the Ottonian court for which he feels a great sympathy.

==== An exemplary education ====
Hugh Capet quickly understood that his ascent could not be attained without the support of Archbishop Adalbero of Reims. Illiterate himself, not mastering Latin, he decided around 984 to send his son, not with the scholar Abbo of Fleury, near Orléans, but to Archbishop Adalbero so he could train him in the basics of knowledge. Indeed, at the end of the 10th century, Reims had a reputation as the most prestigious school of all of West Christianity. The prelate willingly welcomed Robert, who was confided to his secretary, the famous Gerbert of Aurillac, one of the most educated men of his time.

It is assumed that to follow Gerbert's teaching, the young Robert II had to acquire the basics of Latin. He thus enriched his knowledge by studying the trivium (grammar, rhetoric and dialectic) and the quadrivium (arithmetic, geometry, music and astronomy). Robert II is one of the few laypeople of his time to enjoy the same worldview as contemporary clergy. (Note: At that time, even wealthy nobles were illiterate. Culture was above all reserved for the Church and only served to understand the world from a religious point of view.) After about two years of study in Reims, he returned to Orléans. His intellectual level had also developed in the musical field, as recognized by another great scholar of his time, Richer de Reims. According to Helgaud de Fleury, at an age unknown in his adolescence, the young Robert II fell seriously ill, to such an extent that his parents feared for his life. It was then when they went to pray at the Sainte-Croix church in Orleans and offered a golden crucifix and a sumptuous 60-pound (30 kg) vase as a votive offering. Robert II miraculously recovered.

"His pious mother sent him to the schools of Reims and entrusted him to master Gerbert, to be brought up by him and sufficiently instructed in liberal doctrines."

— Helgaud of Fleury, Epitoma vitæ regis Roberti pii, ca 1033.

==== Robert II's ascension to the throne (987) ====
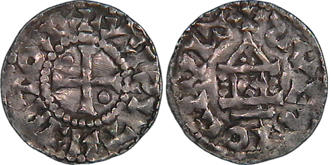
Denier of Robert II the Pious, struck at Soissons.

Immediately after his own coronation, Hugh Capet began to push for the coronation of his son. "The essential means by which the early Capetians were seen to have kept the throne in their family was through the association of the eldest surviving son in the royalty during the father's lifetime," Andrew W. Lewis has observed, in tracing the phenomenon in this line of kings who lacked dynastic legitimacy. (Note: The last Junior King was Philip Augustus, who was crowned in life of his father, the ailing Louis VII.) Hugh Capet's claimed reason was that he was planning an expedition against the Moorish armies harassing Count Borrell II of Barcelona, an invasion which never occurred, and that the stability of the country necessitated a Junior King, should he die while on expedition. Rodulfus Glaber, however, attributes Hugh Capet's request to his old age and inability to control the nobility. Modern scholarship has largely imputed to Hugh Capet the motive of establishing a dynasty against the claims of electoral power on the part of the aristocracy, but this is not the typical view of contemporaries and even some modern scholars have been less sceptical of his "plan" to campaign in Spain.

Once Hugh Capet proposed the association of Robert to the throne, Archbishop Adalbero of Reims was reportedly hostile to this and, according to Richer of Reims, he replied to the king: "we do not have the right to create two kings in the same year" (on n'a pas le droit de créer deux rois la même année). It is believed that Gerbert of Aurillac (who was himself close to Borrell II, for a time his protector), would then have come to the aid of Hugh Capet to convince the Archbishop that the co-kingship was needed due to the purposed expedition to assist the Count of Barcelona, and to secure a stable transition of power. Under duress, Archbishop Adalbero finally consented.

Unlike that of Hugh Capet, the coronation of Robert was precisely detailed by Richer of Reims—even the day and place were clearly identified. Dressed in purple woven with gold threads, as tradition dictated, the 15-year-old boy was acclaimed, crowned and then consecrated by the Archbishop of Reims on 25 December 987 (Note: For some historians, Robert II would have been consecrated on 30 December 987, a non-religious day, since Archbishop Adalbero would have thought long and hard before giving in.) at the Sainte-Croix Cathedral in Orléans.

"The princes of the kingdom were gathered on the day of the Lord's nativity to celebrate the royal coronation ceremony, the Archbishop, taking the purple, solemnly crowned Robert II, son of Hugh, in the basilica of the Holy Cross, to the acclamations of the French, then did so and crowned king of the western peoples from the Meuse river to the Ocean."

Richer of Reims also underlines that Robert II is only "King of the peoples of the West, from the Meuse to the Ocean" and not "King of the Gauls, Aquitaine, Danes, Goths, Spaniards and Gascons" as his father.

=== The episcopal hierarchy, the King's first support ===
==== Robert II directs the religious affairs ====
Crowned as Junior King, Robert II had begun to take on active royal duties with his father, as evidenced by his signum at the bottom of certain acts of Hugh Capet. From 990, all the acts have its inscription. In the written acts: "Robert, very glorious king" as underlined by a charter for Corbie (April 988) or even "filii nostri Rotberti regis ac consortis regni nostri" in a charter for Saint-Maur-des-Fossés (June 989). On the strength of his instruction received from Gerbert of Aurillac, his task, initially, was to preside over episcopal synods:

"He [Robert II] attended synods of bishops to discuss ecclesiastical affairs with them."

— Richer of Reims, ca. 990.

Unlike the last Carolingians, the first Capetians attached a clan of bishops to the north-east of Paris (Amiens, Laon, Soissons, Châlons, etc.) whose support was decisive in the course of events. In one of their diplomas, the two kings appear as intermediaries between the clerics and the people (mediatores et plebis) and, under the pen of Gerbert of Aurillac, the bishops insisted on this need for consilium: "...not wanting anything abuse the royal power, we decide all the affairs of the res publica by resorting to the advice and sentences of our faithful". Hugh Capet and Robert II needed the support of the Church to further consolidate their legitimacy, and also because the contingents of horsemen who made up the royal army came largely from the bishoprics. Robert II already appeared in the eyes of his contemporaries as a pious sovereign (hence his nickname) and close to the Church for several reasons: he devoted himself to the liberal arts; he was present at the synods of bishops; Abbo of Fleury specially dedicated his canonical collection to him; he easily forgave his enemies; and the abbeys received many royal gifts. He sent Ulric, bishop of Orleans, on an embassy to Emperor Constantine VIII and received the gift of a piece of the true cross along with silken hangings.

==== Charles de Lorraine seizes Laon (988–991) ====
Precisely, Hugh Capet and Robert II relied on the contingents sent by the bishoprics since the city of Laon had just been stormed by Charles of Lorraine, the last Carolingian pretender to the throne. The sovereigns besieged the city twice, without result. (Note: In his chronicle, Richer of Reims speaks of reges (kings in the plural).) Concerned about his failure in Laon, Hugh Capet contacted several sovereigns to obtain their help (Pope John XV, Empress Theophanu, mother and Regent on behalf of Emperor Otto III), in vain. After the death of Archbishop Adalbero of Reims (24 January 989), Hugh Capet decided to elect, as new archbishop, the Carolingian Arnoul, an illegitimate son of King Lothair, rather than Gerbert of Aurillac. It is believed that this was to appease the supporters of the Carolingians, but the situation turned against the Capetians when Arnoul surrendered Reims to his uncle Charles.

The situation was unblocked thanks to the betrayal of Ascelin, Bishop of Laon, who seized Charles and Arnoul during their sleep and delivered them to the King (991): the Bishop thus saved the Capetian royalty in extremis. In the Council of Saint-Basle de Verzy, Arnoul was judged as a traitor by an assembly chaired by Robert II (June 991). Despite the protests of Abbon of Fleury, Arnoul was deposed. A few days later, Gerbert of Aurillac was appointed Archbishop of Reims with the support of his former pupil Robert II. Pope John XV did not accept this procedure and wanted to convene a new council in Aix-la-Chapelle, but the bishops confirmed their decision in Chelles (winter 993–994).

==== Gerbert and Ascelin: two figures of disloyalty ====
When his master Adalbero of Reims died, Gerbert of Aurillac was obliged to follow the intrigues of the new archbishop Arnoul, determined to deliver Reims to Charles of Lorraine. Although the documentation is very incomplete on this subject, it seems that the scholar subsequently changed his positions to become Charles's supporter:

"Lothair Augustus's brother, heir to the throne, was expelled from it. His competitors, [Hugh Capet and Robert II], many people think, received the interim of the reign. By what right has the legitimate heir been disinherited?."

— Gerbert of Aurillac, Letters, 990.

A doubt in legitimacy was thus settled on the reign of both Hugh Capet and Robert II. However Gerbert, seeing the situation change to the detriment of Charles of Lorraine, changed sides during the year 991. Having become Archbishop of Reims by the grace of Robert II, he testified:

"With the consent of the two princes, Lord Hugh Augustus and the excellent King Robert [Hugh Capet and Robert II]."

— Gerbert of Aurillac, Letters, 991.

As for Ascelin, Bishop of Laon, after having served the crown by betraying Charles and Arnoul, he soon turned against the Capetians. In the spring of 993, he allied with Count Odo I of Blois to plan the capture of Hugh Capet and Robert II, in agreement with Emperor Otto III. If they succeeded, Louis (the son of Charles of Lorraine) would become King of the Franks, Odo I Duke of the Franks, and Ascelin Bishop of Reims. However, the plot was denounced and Ascelin was placed under house arrest.

=== Marital problems ===
==== First marriage: Rozala of Italy ====
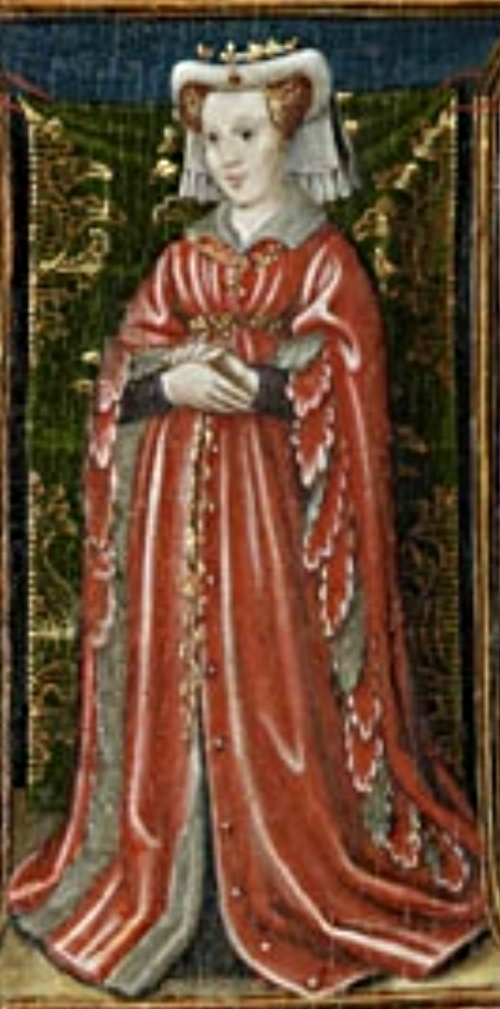
Rozala (renamed Susanna) of Italy, as Countess of Flanders (late years of 15th century).

Immediately after associating his son with the throne, Hugh Capet wanted Robert II to marry a royal princess, but the prohibition against marriage within the third degree of consanguinity obliged him to seek a bride in the East. He had a letter written by Gerbert of Aurillac asking the Byzantine Emperor Basil II for the hand of one of his nieces for Robert II; however, no Byzantine response is recorded. After this rebuff, and under pressure from his father (who apparently wanted to reward the Flemish for their help when he seized power in 987), Robert II had to marry Rozala, daughter of Berengar II of Ivrea, King of Italy and widow of Arnulf II, Count of Flanders. The wedding, celebrated before 1 April 988, brought Robert II possession of the cities of Montreuil and Ponthieu and a possible guardianship over the County of Flanders, given the young age of Rozala's son Baldwin IV, for whom she had been acting as regent ever since her first husband's death.

Upon her marriage, Rozala became junior Queen consort of the Franks and took the name of Susanna; however, after about three or four years of marriage (c. 991–992), the young Robert II repudiated her, due to the excessive age difference between them (Rozala was almost 22 years older than him and probably too old to have more children). In fact, the breakup was justified by the absence of a child from their union and, for this reason, Hugh Capet and his advisers did not oppose the annulment proceedings.

"King Robert, having arrived at his 19th year, in the prime of his youth, repudiated, because she was too old, his wife Susanna, Italian by nation."

— Richer of Reims, History, 996–998.

Separated from her husband, Rozala returned to Flanders at the side of her son Baldwin IV and became one of his principal advisers. Robert II managed to keep the port of Montreuil (part of his former wife's dowry), a strategic point on the Channel. Historians believe that from this period, Robert II wished to challenge his father and finally reign alone.

The marriage was formally annulled in late 996, following Hugh Capet's death and Robert II's ascension as sole King of the French.

==== Second marriage: Bertha of Burgundy ====
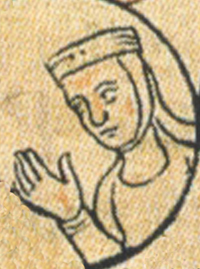
Bertha of Burgundy, detail from a genealogical chart of the Ottonian dynasty in a manuscript of the 2nd half of 12th century.

Now Robert II was determined to find a bride who would give him the much hoped-for male offspring. In early 996, probably during the military campaign against Count Odo I of Blois, he met Countess Bertha of Burgundy, wife of the latter. She was a daughter of King Conrad of Burgundy and his wife Matilda (in turn daughter of King Louis IV of France and Gerberga of Saxony, sister of Otto I, Holy Roman Emperor), so was from an undisputed royal lineage. Robert II and Bertha quickly became attracted to each other despite the complete resistance of Hugh Capet (Note: Moreover, Gerbert of Aurillac expressed his disagreement, not only out of friendship for Hugh Capet but also for canonical reasons.) (the House of Blois was the great enemy of the Capetian dynasty). However, Robert II saw, in addition to his personal feelings, that Bertha would also bring all the Blois territories under Capetian control. The deaths in 996 of Odo I of Blois (12 March) and Hugh Capet (24 October) eliminated the main obstacles for a union between Robert II and Bertha.

According to French historian Michel Rouche, this alliance was purely political: to loosen the grip threatening the Capetian dynasty and its stronghold of Île-de-France, and probably according to the will of Robert II's mother, Queen Adelaide of Aquitaine; indeed, the territories of Odo I were Blois, Chartres, Melun and Meaux. In addition, the couple were just waiting for the statutory nine months set by law after Odo I's death. It was, therefore, obvious that another objective was to have legitimate children.

However, two important details obstructed this union: firstly, Robert II and Bertha were second cousins (their respective grandmothers, Hedwig and Gerberga, were sisters) (Note: Since 830, the canonical doctrine prevented all unions within the 7th degree of kinship, fearing consanguineous relationships.) and secondly, Robert II was the godfather of Theobald, one of the sons of Bertha. (Note: With regard to the spiritual kinship, Helgaud wrote: Quoniam non exhorruit facinus copulationis inlicite, dum commatrem et sibi consanguinitatis vinculo nexam duxit uxorem.) According to canon law, marriage was then impossible. Despite this, the two lovers began a sexual relationship and Robert II put part of the County of Blois under his direct rule. He took over the city of Tours and Langeais from Count Fulk III of Anjou, thus breaking the alliance with the House of Ingelger, faithful support of the late Hugh Capet. At the start of Robert II's reign, the alliance relations were thus changed.

"Bertha, the wife of Odo, took King Robert as her protector and defender of her cause."

— Richer of Reims, History, 996–998.

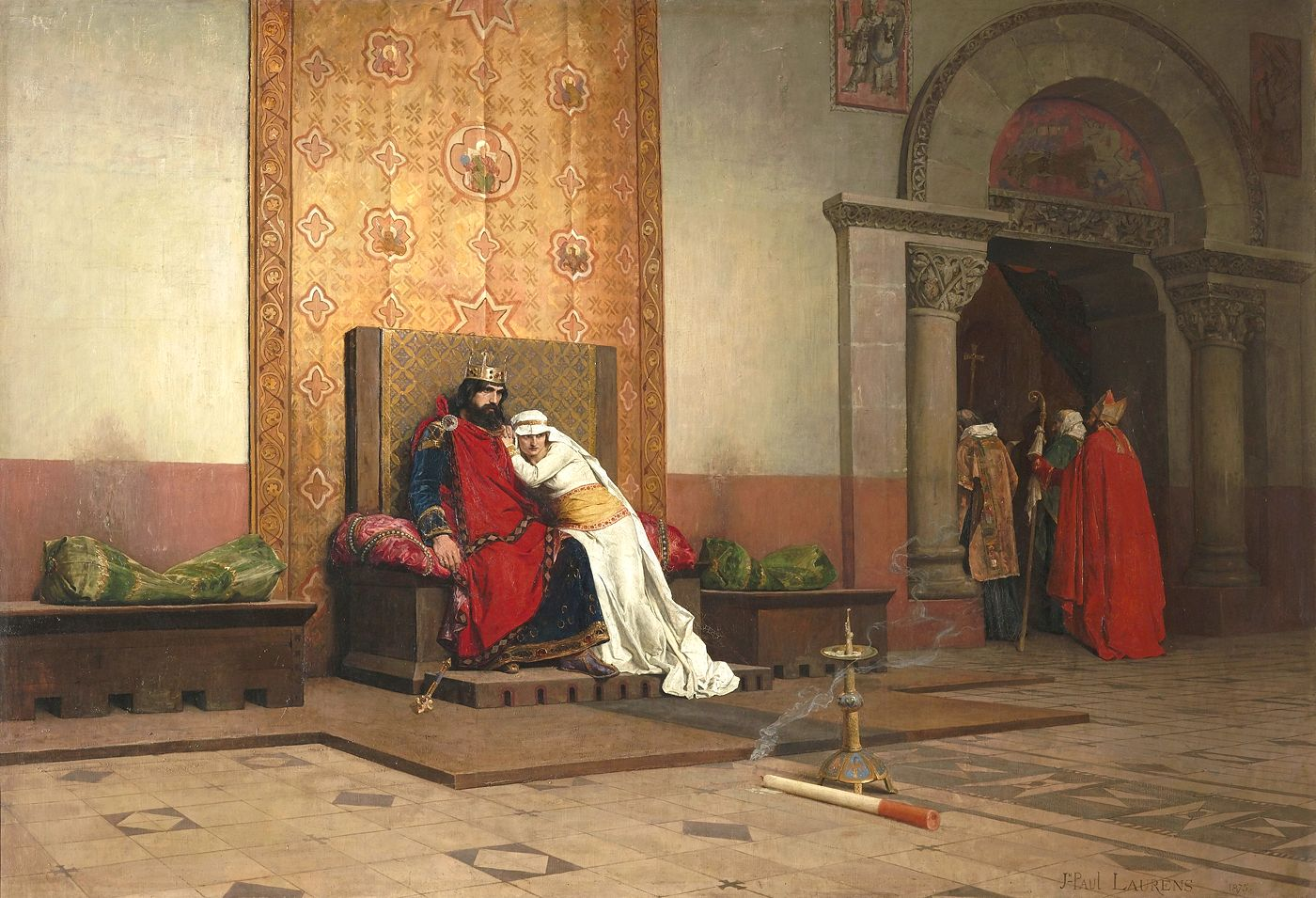
The Excommunication of Robert the Pious, oil on canvas by Jean-Paul Laurens, 1875, currently at the Musée d'Orsay, Paris. In reality, the excommunication of the king was never promulgated by the Pope.

Robert II and Bertha quickly found a complaisant bishop to marry them off, which Archambaud de Sully, Archbishop of Tours, finally did in November/December 996, much to the chagrin of the new Pope Gregory V. To please the Holy See, Robert II annulled the sentence of the Council of Saint-Basle, freed Archbishop Arnoul and restored him to the episcopal see of Reims. Gerbert of Aurillac then had to take refuge with Emperor Otto III in 997. Despite this, the Pope ordered Robert II and Bertha to put an end to their "incestuous union". Finally, the two councils which met first in Pavia (February 997), then in Rome (summer 998), condemned them to do penance for seven years and, in the event of non-separation, they would be struck with excommunication. Moreover, at the end of three years of union, there were no living descendants: Bertha gave birth only to one stillborn son, in 999. That year, the accession of Gerbert of Aurillac to the Papacy under the name of Sylvester II did not change anything. Following a synod, the new Pope accepted the condemnation of the King of the Franks whose "perfidy" he had suffered. Finally, the seven years of penance were completed around 1003.

"They came to the Apostolic See and after having received satisfaction for their penance, they returned home (Postea ad sedem apostolicam venientes, cum satisfactione suscepta penitentia, redierunt ad propria)."

— Ivo of Chartres, IX, 8, letter to King Henry I.

Despite the threat of excommunication, Robert II and Bertha refused to submit until September 1001, when they finally became separated. The inability of Bertha to produce further offspring after her stillbirth was probably the main reason for this. Robert II, in need of male heirs, decided to remarry one more time.

==== Third marriage: Constance of Arles ====
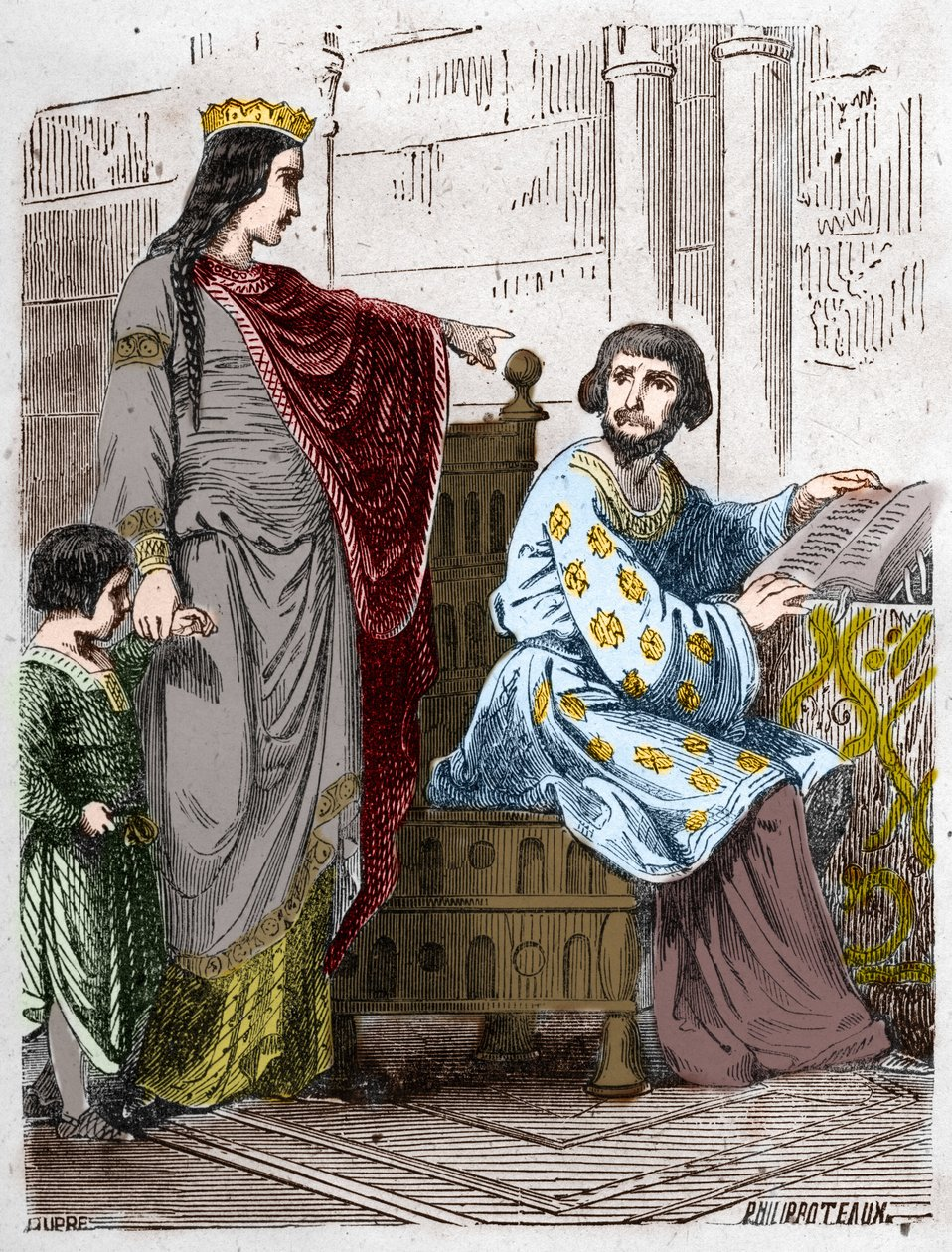
Constance of Arles, depicted in an engraving of the late 19th century.

After October 1002 and before August 1004, Robert II contracted his third and last marriage with the 17-year-old Constance (a distant princess, to avoid any close relationship), daughter of Count William I of Arles and Provence and his wife Adelaide-Blanche of Anjou. The new Queen's parents were prestigious in their own right: Count William I was nicknamed "the Liberator" (le Libérateur) thanks to his victories against the Saracens, and Countess Adelaide-Blanche's blood relations with the House of Ingelger allowed Robert II to restore his alliance with them. Six (Note: According to several sources, and considering the word "daughter" (filla) in the strict contemporary form, many authors believed that Constance, wife of Count Manasses of Dammartin (d. 1037) was another daughter of Robert II—from one of his three marriages, or daughter-in-law, or illegitimate daughter or even a godchild—and Constance of Arles—due to onomastics reasons she could be either her mother or godmother—. The connection is suggested by the presence of the royal couple at a donation by "Manasses comes" dated 4 February 1031 where Constance is named as filla of the King and Queen. On the other hand, Rodolfus Glaber records that Robert II had two daughters by his wife Constance, presumably referring to Hedwig and Adela, so ignoring any daughter named Constance. According to Europäische Stammtafeln, the wife of Count Manasses was "Constance [of Dammartin]", presumably on the theory that she brought her husband the County of Dammartin.) children born from Constance's marriage to Robert II are recorded:

- Hedwig [Advisa], Countess of Auxerre (ca. 1003 – aft. 1063), married Renauld I, Count of Nevers on 25 January 1016 and had issue.
- Hugh, Junior King (1007 – 17 September 1025).
- Henry I, successor (bef. 17 April/4 May 1008 – 4 August 1060).
- Adela, Countess of Contenance (ca. 1009 – 8 January 1079), married (1) Richard III of Normandy and (2) Count Baldwin V of Flanders.
- Robert (1011–12 – 21 March 1076), named by his father heir to the Duchy of Burgundy in 1030, installed as such in 1032 by his brother.
- Odo [Eudes] (1013 – 15 May 1057–59), who may have been intellectually disabled according to the chronicle (ended in 1138) of Pierre, son of Béchin, canon of Saint-Martin-de-Tours. He died after his brother's failed invasion of Normandy.

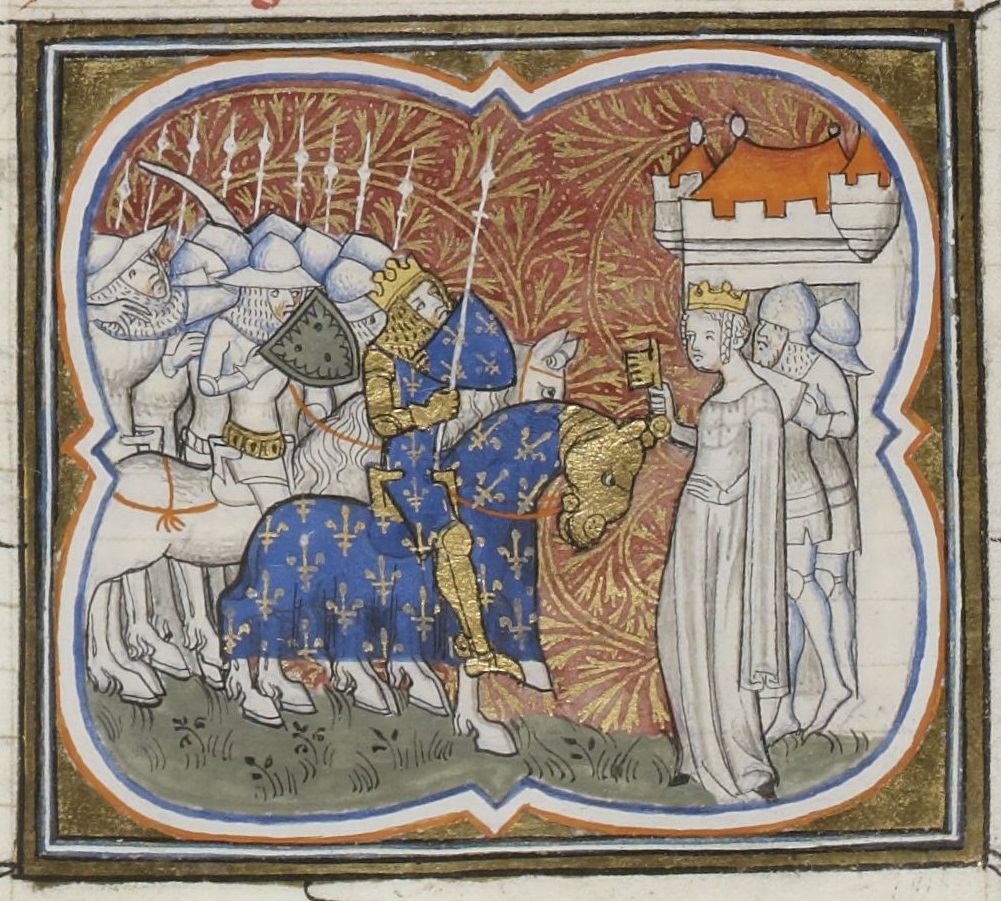
Constance of Arles surrendering to her son Henry I of France. Illumination on parchment from ca. 1375–1380 manuscript. Bibliothèque nationale de France, Fr 2813, folio 177 recto.

Since early in her marriage, Constance often placed herself at the center of many intrigues to preserve a preponderant place in the Frankish court. Rodolfus Glaber rightly emphasized that the Queen was "in control of her husband". For contemporaries, a woman who led her husband implied an abnormal situation. It all started at the beginning of the year 1008, a day when the King and his faithful Count palatine Hugh of Beauvais were hunting in the forest of Orléans. Suddenly, twelve armed men appeared and threw themselves on Hugh before killing him under the eyes of the king. The crime was ordered by Count Fulk III of Anjou, and with all probability supported by the Queen. (Note: Hugh of Beauvais, cousin of the Count of Blois, was one of Bertha's supporters, which explains Constance's hostility towards him.) Robert II, exasperated by his wife after six or seven years of marriage (c. 1009–1010), went personally to Rome accompanied by Angilramme (a monk from Saint-Riquier) and Bertha de Burgundy. His plan was to obtain from Pope Sergius IV an annulment from his marriage with Constance and to remarry Bertha, whom Robert II still loved deeply, under the grounds of Constance's participation in the murder of Hugh of Beauvais. Odorannus, a Benedictine monk from the Abbey of Saint-Pierre-le-Vif in Sens, explains in his writings that during her husband's journey to Rome, Constance withdrew in distress to her dominions at Theil. According to him, Saint Savinian would have appeared to him and secured that the royal marriage would be preserved; three days later, Robert II was back, definitively abandoning Bertha. (Note: From 1010, Bertha disappeared from the documentation and she died in January of the same year.) The problems did not end, however. The rivalry between Bertha and Constance only enhanced the hatred between the Houses of Blois and Anjou. In the midst of this dispute, after the military victory of Odo II of Blois over Fulk III of Anjou in Pontlevoy (1016), the Queen sought to strengthen her family's position at court. For this, she and her Angevin relatives pressured the King to associate her eldest son Hugh to the throne, to ensure the regency of Constance over the Kingdom in the event of Robert II's death. Against the opinion of the royal councilors and the territorial princes, Robert II relented and thus, according to Rodulfus Glaber, 10-years-old Hugh was consecrated Junior King on Pentecost Day (9 June) 1017 in the church of the Abbey of Saint-Corneille in Compiègne. Although the association markedly favored the House of Anjou (and could put the sovereign's own life at risk), Robert II considered that this was the best way to consolidate the new Capetian dynasty and prevent another of the noble families from disputing the throne. However, he did not give any royal power to his son and, for this, Hugh was constantly humiliated by his mother. When he came of age, the junior King rebelled against his father, but eventually was restored in the royal favor.

=== Territorial conquests ===
The King led a clear policy: to recover the count palatine's function for his own benefit, either by appropriating it or by ceding it to a friendly bishop, as did the Ottonian dynasty, the most powerful rulers in the West at that time. Robert II's most brilliant victory, however, would be the acquisition of the Duchy of Burgundy.

Henry I, Duke of Burgundy died on 15 October 1002 without a legitimate heir. According to the Chronique de Saint-Bénigne, he designated his stepson Otto-William of Ivrea, Count of Burgundy and Count of Mâcon (son of Henry I's first wife Gerberga and her first husband Adalbert of Ivrea, sometime King of Italy) as the heir (Note: This contradicts the Chronicle of William of Jumièges, who reports that in fact, Duke Henry I appointed his nephew Robert II as his heir, but "with arrogant pride, the Burgundians refuse to acknowledge him as their Duke".) of his domains; however, and despite counting on the support of many Burgundian lords to his rights, Otto-William cared more about his lands in overseas Saône and towards Italy from which he came. (Note: There are serious indications that in 1016 Otto-William was a candidate for the Kingdom of Lombardy: he had already distributed his County of Mâcon and those of overseas Saône to his children. In 1024, he gave in the presence of the King to the Piedmontese Abbey of Fruttuaria, founded by Guglielmo da Volpiano, the old Beaune Monastery of Saint-Martin de l'Aigue, dying two years later, on 24 September 1026.) The Duchy of Burgundy, acquired in 943 by Hugh the Great, Henry I's father, was part of the Robertian family possessions. Moreover, Burgundy was a major stake since it abounded in rich cities (Dijon, Auxerre, Langres, Sens). With the death of his uncle, Robert II claimed the succession over the Duchy of Burgundy as his closest male blood relative and also as a complete fief.

The rivalry between Hugh of Chalon, Bishop of Auxerre (supporter of Robert II) and Landry, Count of Nevers (son-in-law and ally of Otto-William) over the possession of Auxerre, triggered the armed intervention of the Frankish King who, with the help of troops lent by Richard II, Duke of Normandy, gathered his army in spring 1003 and engaged them in Burgundy, but they failed in front of Auxerre and Saint-Germain d'Auxerre. In 1004, Robert II besieged Beaune. Autun and Beaune were under control of the king, which forced Otto-William to initiate a diplomatic settlement. In 1005, Robert II, his men and the Normans were back in the north of the duchy. They took Avallon after a few days of fighting, then Auxerre. An arrangement (Note: Agreement in which was undoubtedly included the marriage of one of Otto-William's sons with a daughter of the Duke of Normandy.) had already been made between the King and Otto-William, who was with him during the siege of Avallon. Under the mediation of Bishop Hugh of Chalon, Count Landry was reconciled with the King by renouncing the Counties of Avallon and Auxerre. At the end of the agreements of 1005–1006, Otto-William had renounced the ducal title of Burgundy and all the possessions of his late stepfather, which reverted to the Crown, except the city of Dijon, still in the possession of Brunon of Roucy, the irreducible Bishop of Langres, who did not want Robert II to settle there at any cost.

The Kingdom of the Franks during late 10th century.

In Sens, a fight arose between Count Fromond II and Archbishop Léotheric for the control of the city. The Archbishop, who was close to the King, was furious at the behavior of the Count, who had built a powerful defense tower. In 1012, Renard II succeeded his father Fromond II and the situation worsened in as much as the Bishop of Langres, Brunon de Roucy, enemy of Robert II, was Renard II's maternal uncle. Léotheric, isolated, appealed to the King. The latter wished to intervene for several reasons: Sens was one of the main archiepiscopal cities of the Kingdom, it was also an obligatory passage to go to Burgundy and, finally, the possession of the County of Sens would allow Robert II to fragment the possessions of Odo II de Blois in two parts. Renard II was excommunicated and underwent the attack of the King, who seized Sens on 22 April 1015. Renard II, in the meantime, had allied himself with Odo II de Blois, and offered Robert II a compromise: he would continue to exercise his rule as Count as vassal and, upon his death, the territory would revert to the Crown. Renard II died 40 years later (1055) and with his death, the County of Sens reverted to the crown.

As soon as the fight against the County of Sens ended, Robert II left for Dijon to complete the conquest of the Duchy of Burgundy. According to the Chronique de Saint-Bénigne, Abbot Odilo of Cluny intervened and the King, moved by his pleas, decided not to attack Dijon. (Note: The presence of Humbert de Mailly and Gui le Riche, two valued lieutenants of Hugh III of Beaumont, Count of Dijon, to whom the latter had handed over the guard of the castrum of Dijon were perhaps important factors in Robert II's decision to renounce the assault.) Brunon of Roucy died on 30 January 1016, and a few days later, the royal troops returned to Dijon and Robert II installed Lambert de Vignory as the new bishop of Langres; in exchange, the new bishop ceded Dijon and his county to the King. After fifteen years of military and diplomatic campaigns, Robert II finally entered into full possession of the Duchy of Burgundy.

The King's second son, Henry, received the ducal title but, given his young age, Robert II kept the government and went there regularly. The death in 1027 of Hugh, the elder brother of Henry, made the latter the heir to the throne; the duchy then passed to the King's third son Robert, whose descendants would rule until the middle of the 14th century. The overseas lands of the old Kingdom of Burgundy, called Franche-Comté, would follow the destiny of the Holy Roman Empire.

When, on 9 January 1007, Bouchard I of Vendôme (the former faithful of Hugh Capet) died, the County of Paris he held was not inherited by his son, Renaud but instead reverted to the crown, and when Renaud died in 1017, the King appropriated his Counties of Melun and Dreux, which also joined the royal demesne. Dagobert, Archbishop of Bourges died in 1012, and Robert II himself appointed his replacement, Gauzlin, former Abbot of Fleury; however, the viscount of the same city, Geoffrey, tried to intervene personally in the choice of Dagobert's successor and prevented the new archbishop from entering the city, and only through the intercession of Pope Benedict VIII, Odilo of Cluny and Robert II himself could Gauzlin finally take possession of his seat.

=== The heretics of Orléans (1022) ===
The year 1000 constituted the "awakening of heresy". Before the High Middle Ages, there was no such persecution. The 11th century inaugurated a series of bonfire heretics in the West: Orléans (1022), Milan (1027), and Cambrai (1078). As for Robert II, the case of the heretics of Orléans was a fundamental part of his reign and, at the time, of an unprecedented impact. The nature of the events is told to us by exclusively ecclesiastical sources: Rodulfus Glaber, Adémar de Chabannes, Andrew of Fleury, Jean de Ripoll and Paul de Chartres. The year 1000 extended the idea of a corrupt century where the wealth of the clergy contrasted terribly with the humility advocated by Jesus Christ. Some clerics questioned this system and wished to purify Christian society. This debate was not new: already in the 9th century, there was controversy among scholars about the Eucharist and the cult of saints, but in 1022, it was of a different nature.

Rodulfus Glaber told the story of the peasant Leutard of Vertus from Champagne who, around 994, decided to dismiss his wife, to destroy the crucifix of his local church and to preach to the villagers the refusal to pay tithes with the pretext of reading the Holy Scriptures. The Bishop of his diocese, Gibuin I of Châlons, then summoned him, and debated with him before the people and convinced them of the peasant's heretical madness. Abandoned by all, Leutard committed suicide. This situation was repeated throughout the eleventh century with various people who disagreed with Catholic orthodoxy: they were put to debate with highly educated clergymen in public, so that they and their message were ridiculed and discredited in the eyes of the common people. As for Adémar de Chabannes, he reported, around 1015–1020, the appearance of Manicheans in Aquitaine, especially in the cities of Toulouse and Limoges.

The common themes of heretics were the renunciation of carnal copulation, the destruction of images, the uselessness of the Church and the repudiation of the sacraments (especially baptism and marriage). Astonished by this wave of disputes, Rodulfus Glaber evoked in his writings that Satan was freed "after a thousand years" according to the Apocalypse and that he must have inspired all these heretics from Leutard to the Orleanais. Another contemporary of the time is expressed:

"They [the heretics] claimed that they had faith in the Trinity, in divine unity and in the Incarnation of the Son of God, but that was a lie because they were saying that the baptized cannot receive the Holy Spirit in the baptism and that after mortal sin no one can be forgiven in any way."

— Andrew of Fleury, ca. 1025.

For the chroniclers, the Orléans heresy came sometimes from a Périgord peasant (Adémar de Chabannes) and sometimes from a woman from Ravennes (Rodulfus Glaber). But above all, the most inadmissible was that the evil affected Orléans, the royal city and seat of the Sainte-Croix Cathedral where Robert II was baptized, which was sacred only a few decades earlier. Some canons of the cathedral, close to the court, were supporters of those doctrines considered heretical: Théodat, Herbert (master of the collegiate church of Saint-Pierre-le-Puellier), Foucher and, especially, Étienne (confessor of Queen Constance) and Lisoie (cantor of Sainte-Croix), among others. The King was warned by Richard II of Normandy, and on Christmas Day 1022, the heretics were arrested and interrogated for long hours. Rodulfus Glaber reported that they recognized belonging to the "sect" for a long time and that their purpose was to convince the royal court of their beliefs (refusal of the sacraments, food prohibitions, on the virginity of the Virgin Mary and on the Trinity). These details are surely true; on the other hand, it is abusively obvious that Rodulfus Glaber and the other chroniclers demonized at will the meetings of the "circle of Orléans": they suspected them of practicing sexual orgies and of worshiping the Devil, among others ritual crimes. These reproaches were those made to the first Christians during Late antiquity.

"At that time, ten of the canons of Sainte-Croix of Orléans, who seemed more pious than the others, were convinced to be Manicheans. King Robert, faced with their refusal to return to the faith, had them first stripped of their priestly dignity, then expelled from the Church, and finally delivered to the flames."

— Adémar de Chabannes, ca. 1025.

According to legend, Étienne, Constance's confessor, received a blow from her cane which perforated his eye. Robert II had an immense pyre erected outside the city on 28 December 1022, hoping to frighten them, but he was surprised by their reaction:

"Sure of themselves, they feared nothing from the fire; they announced that they would emerge unscathed from the flames, and laughing they let themselves be tied in the middle of the pyre. Soon they were completely reduced to ashes and no debris of their bones was even found."

— Adémar de Chabannes, ca. 1025.

This relentlessness surprised contemporaries and even modern historians. The various chroniclers, although they are horrified by the practices of the heretics, did not comment at any time about this event, and Helgaud of Fleury even ignored the episode. It was believed that the history of the heretics of Orleans would tarnish Robert II's saintly reputation and for this, the event was barely mentioned in the contemporary sources. In any case, the event was causing so much noise in the Kingdom that it would have been perceived as far away as Catalonia, according to a letter from the monk John to his Abbot Oliba of Ripoll: "If you have heard of it, it was quite true", he said. For historians, this episode would refer to a settling of scores. In 1016, Robert II had imposed on the episcopal seat of Orléans one of his subordinates, Thierry II, at the expense of Oudry de Broyes, the candidate of Odo II of Blois. However, the whole affair of the Orléans heresy, in which he was perhaps involved, broke out under his episcopate. To rid himself of all responsibility, the King would have liked to violently liquidate the impostors.

=== The persecution of the Jews ===
In 1007, the Fatimid Caliph Al-Hakim bi-Amr Allah launched a wave of persecution of Christians, which led to the destruction of several places of worship, notably in Jerusalem and Alexandria. Robert II accused the Jews of complicity with Muslims (although they themselves were victims of Muslim persecution). A series of atrocities against the Jews followed, reported by Rodulfus Glaber and Adémar de Chabannes: Spoliations, massacres and forced conversions were the tragic fate of Jewish communities in the Kingdom of France. These abuses are corroborated by an anonymous Jewish chronicler, who further reports that a notable Jew from Rouen, Ya'aqov ben Iéqoutiel, made a trip to Rome to appeal for the help of Pope John XVIII, who was already ill-disposed towards Robert II because of his marital history. He indeed obtained the support of the Pope, then of his successor Pope Sergius IV, who demanded that Robert II bring back the anti-Jewish decrees and put an end to the persecutions.

=== Later years, death, and burial ===
The last great event of the reign of Robert II was the association with the throne of his second son, Henry. After the premature death in 1025 of Hugh, the eldest son and first Junior King, Constance opposed the association of her second son Henry, and wanted the new co-ruler to be her third son Robert. In the royal court, Henry was considered too effeminate, which was contrary to the masculine principle of virtus. Favorable to the election of the best candidate, the episcopate and many territorial princes showed their refusal; however, the King, supported by a few personalities (Odo II of Blois, Odilo of Cluny, Guglielmo da Volpiano), imposed his will and Henry was finally consecrated as Junior King on 14 May 1027 at Reims Cathedral by Archbishop Ebles I of Roucy. With this event, Robert II definitively endorsed the association established to the throne of the heir by the sovereign in force. (Note: During Robert II's association in 987 this problem did not arise, because he was the only male heir to Hugh Capet.) The greatest of the Kingdom attended the consecration: Odo II of Blois, William V of Aquitaine, Richard III of Normandy. According to the chronicler Hildegaire of Poitiers, once the ceremony was over, Constance fled on horseback mad with rage.

After forty years of Robert II's reign, political turmoil was emerging in the Kingdom of France during 1027–1029: in Normandy, the new Duke Robert the Magnificent expelled his uncle Robert, Archbishop of Rouen. The sovereign had to arbitrate the conflict until everything was in order. The same type of scenario erupted in Flanders where the King's young son-in-law Baldwin (husband of Robert II's second daughter Adela), eager for power and at the instigation of his own wife, rose up against his father, Baldwin IV in vain. For his part, Odo II of Blois enlisted for his benefit the new Junior King Henry in his fight against Fulk III of Anjou. Over 55 years old, an age at which in the tradition of the time one must step aside from power, Robert II was still on his throne. He endured several revolts from his sons, Henry and Robert, who most likely intrigued with their mother, Constance (1030). Robert II and Constance escaped to Burgundy, where they joined forces with their son-in-law, Renauld I of Nevers (husband of their eldest daughter Advisa). Back in their domain, peace was restored between the members of the royal family.

Robert II finally died on 20 July 1031 at his residence in Melun of an overwhelming fever. Alberic of Trois-Fontaines records the death of "rex Francorum Robertus", while Rodulfus Glaber also mentions the death of the King at Melun and his place of burial. The necrology of Chartres Cathedral records the death "XII Kal Aug" of "Rotbertus rex", and the necrology of the Abbey of Saint-Denis records the death "XIII Kal Aug" of "Rotbertus...Francorum rex".

A few days earlier, on 29 June, according to Helgaud of Fleury, a solar eclipse had come to announce a bad omen:

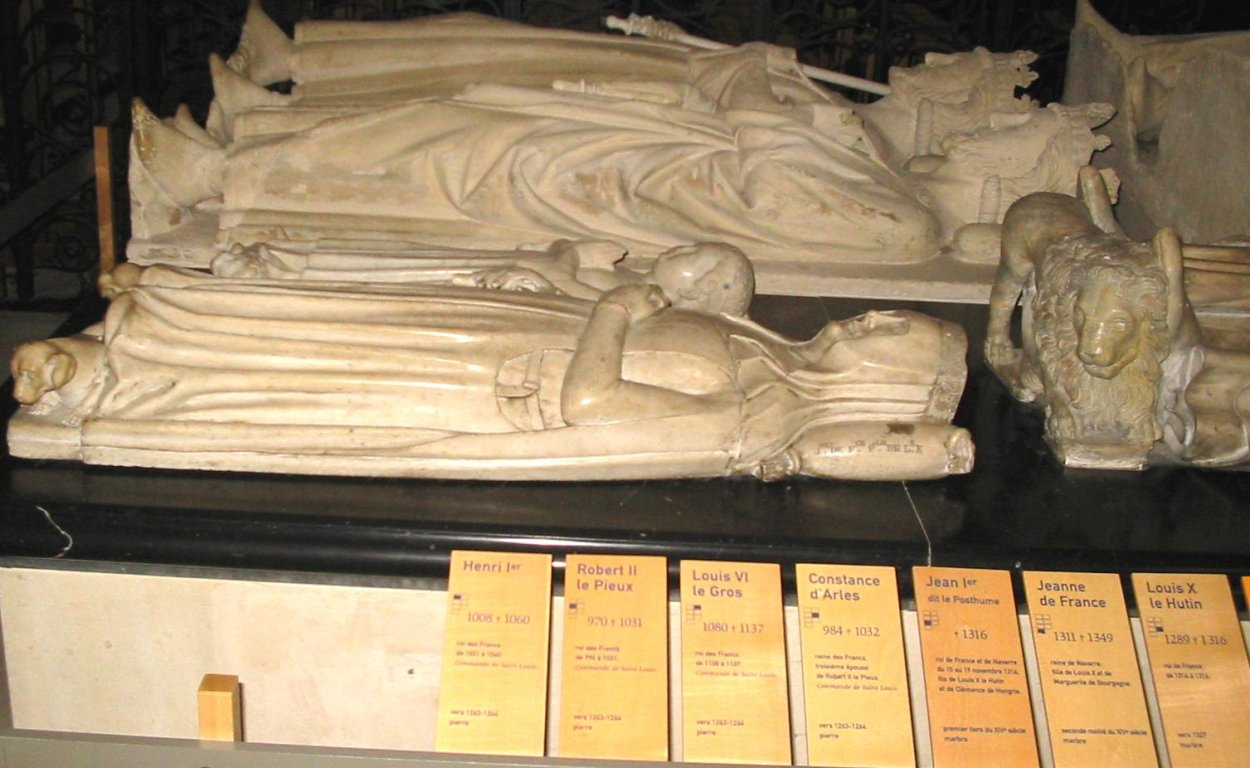
Effigies of Robert II (middle) and Constance of Arles (front) at Saint Denis Basilica.

"Some time before his most holy death, which happened on 20 July, on the day of the death of the Holy Apostles Peter and Paul, the sun, like the last quarter of the moon, veiled its rays to everyone, and appeared at the sixth hour of the day, turning pale above the heads of men, the sight of which was so obscured, that they remained without recognizing each other until the moment to see was returned."

— Helgaud of Fleury, Epitoma vitæ regis Roberti pii, ca. 1033.

Much appreciated by the monks of Saint-Denis, the deceased King was hastily transported from Melun to the Abbey where his father was already resting, in front of the altar of the Holy Trinity. The benefits that the sovereign offered to the abbey were enormous. When writing their chronicle, the monks claimed that by the time of his death, rivers overflowed (toppling houses and carrying children), a comet passed in the sky and a famine plagued the kingdom for nearly two years. When he finished his biography around 1033, Helgaud of Fleury was surprised that the tomb of the pious Robert II was still only covered with a simple slab and no ornament. Not until the middle of the 13th century did his descendant, Louis IX of France (commonly known as Saint Louis), have new gisants carved for all members of the royal family.

== Overview of reign ==
=== The establishment of the Banal Lordship ===
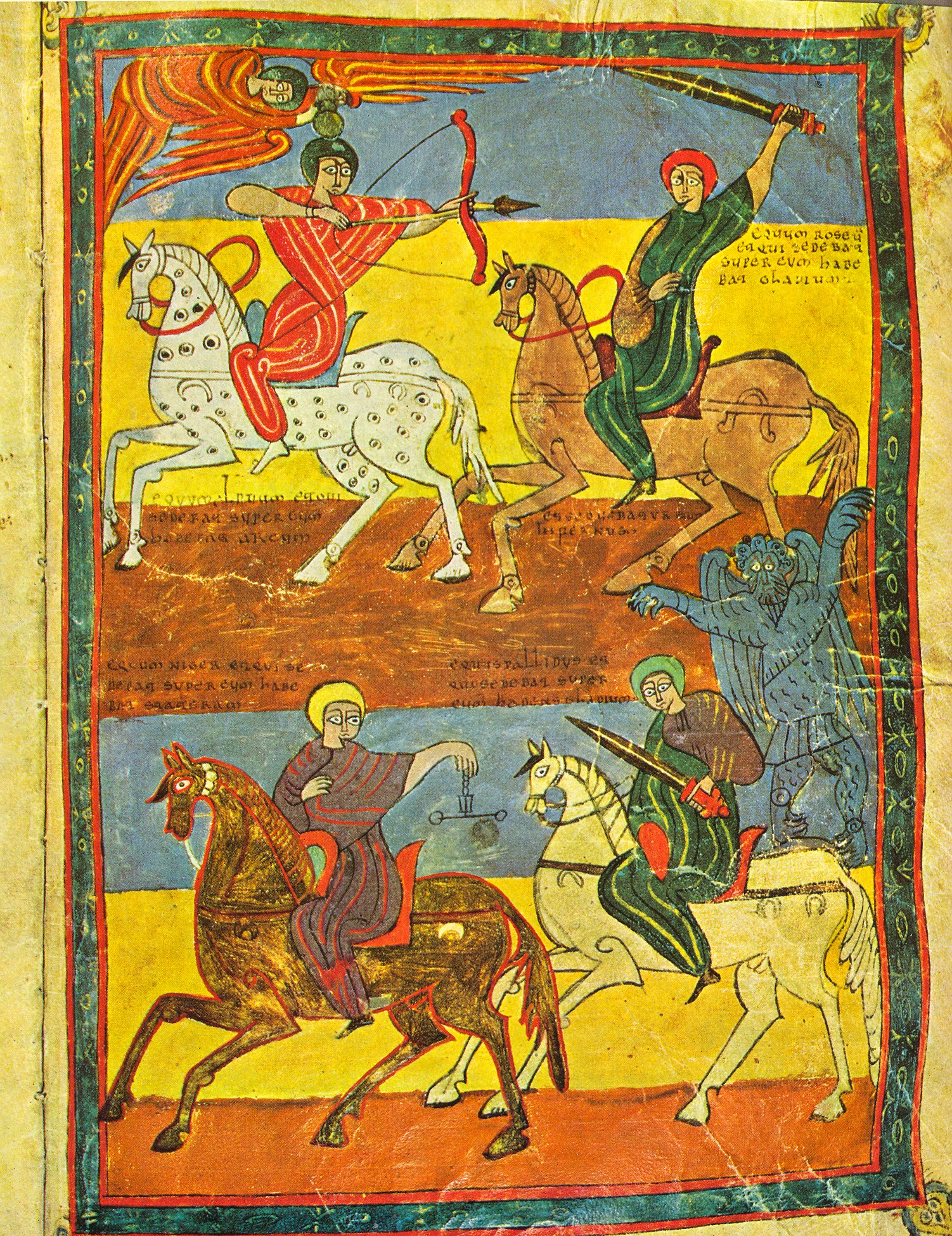
"The Four Horsemen". Oveco (commissioned by Abbot Semporius), Apocalypse of Valladolid, c. 970. Library of Valladolid, Spain.

=== Robert II and the Church ===
==== A "monk king" ====
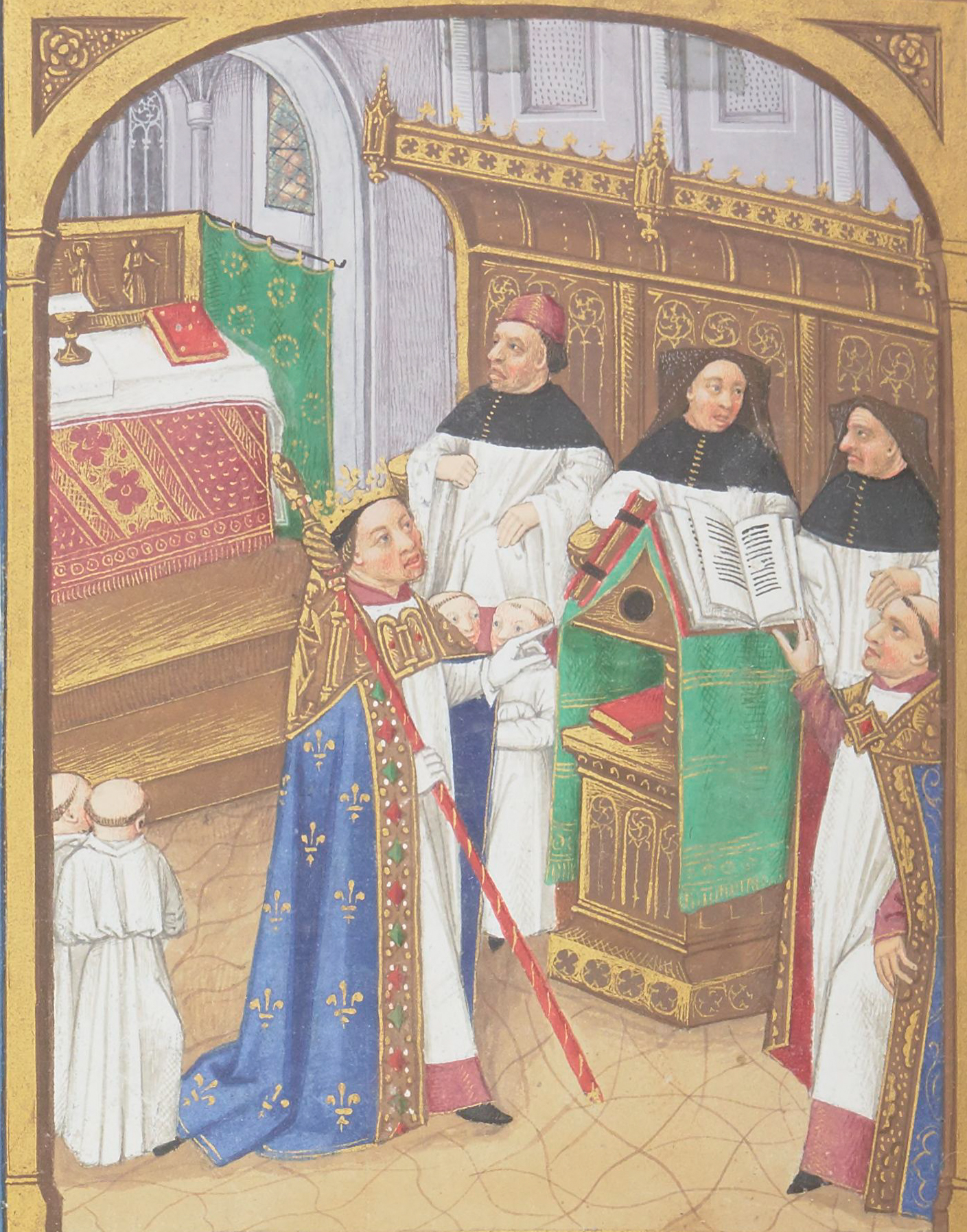
Robert the Pious at the office in the cathedral of Orleans. Robinet Testard, Grandes Chroniques de France, ca. 1471. Bibliothèque nationale de France, Fr. 2609.

Anxious to ensure their salvation and to repair their sins (incursions into Church land, murders, incestuous unions), kings, dukes and counts of the year 1000 attracted to them the most efficient monks and endowed them richly, such as the chronicle which Helgaud of Fleury wrote for Robert II.

Robert II was a devout Catholic, hence his sobriquet "the Pious." He was musically inclined, being a composer, chorister, and poet, and made his palace a place of religious seclusion where he conducted the matins and vespers in his royal robes. Robert II's reputation for piety also resulted from his lack of toleration for heretics, whom he harshly punished. He is said to have advocated forced conversions of local Jewry. He supported riots against the Jews of Orléans who were accused of conspiring to destroy the Church of the Holy Sepulchre in Jerusalem. Furthermore, Robert II reinstated the Roman imperial custom of burning heretics at the stake. In 1030–1031, Robert confirmed the foundation of Noyers Abbey.

==== Fleury Abbey and the rise of the monastic movement ====
The reign of Hugh Capet was that of the episcopate; that of Robert II was otherwise. Since the Council of Verzy (991–992), the Capetians had been at the heart of a political-religious crisis which opposed, on the one hand, someone close to power, Bishop Arnoul II of Orléans, and on the other Abbo of Fleury. (Note: However, it would have been wrong to think that Hugh Capet was completely foreign to the Cluniac movement. He was very a good friend of Abbot Majolus of Cluny, on whose tomb he went to meditate some time before his own death.)

In these troubled times (10th–11th centuries), there was the revival of monasticism which was characterized by the desire to reform the Church, a return to the Benedictine tradition, and a fleeting revival of the days of Louis the Pious by Benedict of Aniane. Their role was to repair "the sins of the people". The monks quickly met with great success: kings and counts attracted them to them and endowed them richly in land (often confiscated from enemies), in objects of all kinds, and the great abbots were called to purify certain places. Thus Guglielmo da Volpiano was called by Duke Richard II of Normandy to Fécamp (1001). Under the aegis of Cluny, the monasteries were increasingly seeking to free themselves from episcopal supervision, in particular Fleury-sur-Loire. Moreover, abbots went to Rome between 996 and 998 to claim privileges of exemption from the Pope. In the southern regions of the kingdom, Cluny and other establishments, peace movements were disseminated with the help of certain ecclesiastics who hoped for a strengthening of their power: Odilo, supported by his relatives, worked in close collaboration with the bishop of Puy to begin the Truce of God in Auvergne (ca. 1030). Nevertheless, in the northern provinces, Cluny did not have good press. Here the bishops were at the head of powerful counties and the intervention of the Cluniac movement could harm them. Ascelin of Laon and Gerard of Cambrai did not like the monks whom they considered to be impostors. Moreover, on the side of the bishops, there was no lack of criticism against the monks: thus they were accused of having an opulent life, of having unnatural sexual activities and of wearing luxury clothes (the example of the Abbot Mainard of Saint-Maur-des-Fossés is detailed). On the side of the regulars, examples against the bishops abounded: it was said that the prelates were very rich (trafficking in sacred objects, simony) and dominated as true warlords. Abbo of Fleury, the leader of the monastic reform movement, set an example by trying to go and pacify and discipline the monastery of La Réole, where he would be killed in a fight in 1004. (Note: In 909–910, William I the Pious, Duke of Aquitaine, founded Cluny, without the authorization of the bishop, receiving exemption from the Pope.)

The strength of Fleury and Cluny were their respective intellectual centers: the first retained in the 11th century more than 600 manuscripts from all walks of life, and Abbot Abbo himself wrote numerous treatises, the fruit of distant trips, notably to England, upon which he reflected (for example, on the role of the ideal prince); the second, through Rodulphus Glaber, was a place where history was written. Hugh Capet and Robert II, solicited by the two parties (episcopal and monastic), received the complaint from Abbo who denounced the actions of a layman, Lord Arnoul of Yèvres, who would have erected a tower without royal authorization and above all would have submitted by force the peasant communities that belong to the Abbey of Fleury. Bishop Arnoul II of Orléans, the uncle of Arnulf of Yèvres, said meanwhile that his nephew (???), for the King needed support to fight against Count Odo I of Blois. Finally, a negotiation took place under the chairmanship of Robert II and a diploma dated in Paris in 994 temporarily put an end to the quarrel. Abbo was then denounced as a "corrupter" and summoned to a royal assembly. He wrote a letter for the event entitled "Apologetic Book against Bishop Arnoul of Orléans" (Livre apologétique contre l'évêque Arnoul d'Orléans), which he addressed to Robert II, reputed to be literate and steeped in religious culture. The Abbot of Fleury seized the opportunity to claim the protection of the sovereign, who responded favorably. The traditional Carolingian episcopate then felt abandoned by royalty and threatened by the monks. This situation would be reinforced with the death of Hugh Capet in the fall of 996. (Note: Once he became the sole sovereign, Robert II renewed his advisers, and his father's team (Bouchard of Vendôme, Gerbert of Aurillac and Arnoul of Orléans) no longer had any reason to exist. We also know today that, to defend himself, Abbo had falsified an exemption charter in 997 (a practice which was common in certain religious establishments and for a long time).) Robert II was now more tempted by monastic culture than by episcopal and pontifical power which still remained largely the servant of the Holy Roman Empire. In parallel with these factional struggles, we also know that bishops and abbots found themselves alongside the counts to ensure that their legal immunities were respected.

==== Robert II, the ideal prince ====
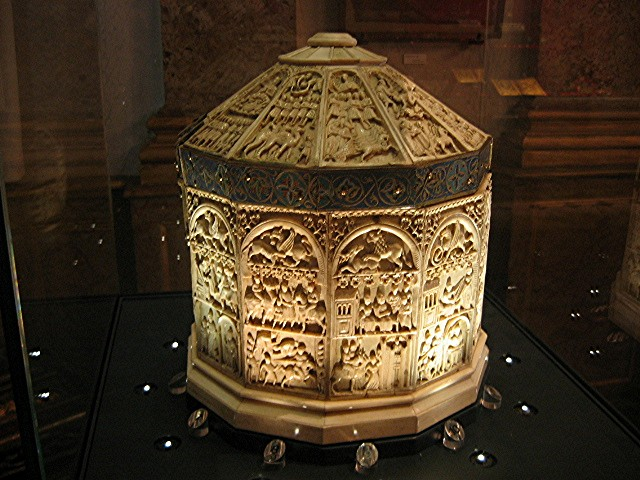
Merovingian holy reliquary from the 6th century on which Robert II probably had to pray. Currently displayed in the Museum of Sens.

On the death of Robert II, the canons of Saint-Aignan asked a monk from Fleury who had worked with the sovereign and had access to the library of the Loire Abbey, to compose the biography of the second ruler of the Capetian dynasty.

"The very good and very pious Robert, King of the Franks, son of Hugh, whose piety and goodness resounded by everyone, has with all his power enriched cherished and honored this saint [Aignan] by whose permission we have wanted to write the life of this very excellent king."

— Helgaud of Fleury, Epitoma vitæ regis Roberti pii, ca. 1033.

In his biography, Helgaud strives to demonstrate the holiness of this king since he does not intend to relate the facts relating to warlike functions. This work seems to have been inspired by the life of Gerald of Aurillac, another lay saint told by Odilo of Cluny. The life of Robert II is a series of exempla, intended to show that the behavior of the king was that of a humble prince who possessed all the qualities: gentleness, charity, accessible to all, forgiving everything. This hagiography is different from the traditional royal ideology, since the king seems to follow in the footsteps of Christ. Sin allows kings to recognize themselves as mere mortals and thus lay a solid foundation for the new dynasty.

The Abbey of Fleury, since the reign of Hugh Capet, has taken care of deeply legitimizing the Capetian monarchy by creating a new royal ideology. According to Helgaud, Robert II is since his coronation, particeps Dei regni (participant in the Kingship of God). Indeed, the young sovereign received in 987 the anointing of oil at the same time temporal and spiritual, "desiring to fulfill his power and his will with the gift of the holy blessing". All the clerics for whom we have the works, submit to the royal person: for Helgaud, Robert holds the place of God on earth (princeps Dei), Fulbert of Chartres calls him "holy father" or " your Holiness", for Adémar de Chabannes it is the "Father of the poor" and finally according to Ascelin of Laon, he received from God the true wisdom giving him access to the knowledge of "the celestial and unchanging universe". Another great scholar of his time, Rodulfus Glaber, relates the meeting between Henry II, Holy Roman Emperor and Robert II in the city of Ivois in August 1023. They endeavored to define together the principles of a peace common to all Christendom. According to the theorists of the 11th century, Robert II was at the level of the Emperor by his mother since she has Roman ancestry, the Francorum imperator.

Secret of their success with the church hierarchy, the first Capetians (and in the first place Robert II) are famous for having carried out many religious foundations. Hugh the Great and Hugh Capet in their time had founded the monastery of Saint-Magloire on the right bank in Paris. Queen Adelaide, mother of Robert II, reputed to be very pious, ordered the construction of the monastery of Saint-Frambourg in Senlis and especially the one dedicated to Saint Marie in Argenteuil. According to Helgaud of Fleury:

"She [Queen Adelaide] also built in Parisis, at a place called Argenteuil, a monastery where she brought together a considerable number of servants of the Lord, living according to the rule of Saint Benedict."

— Helgaud of Fleury, Epitoma vitæ regis Roberti pii, ca. 1033.

Robert II is in the forefront in the defense of the saints who, according to him, guarantee the effectiveness of divine grace and "thus contribute to the purification of society by blocking the forces of evil". Several crypts were built or renovated for the occasion: Saint-Cassien in Autun, Sainte-Marie in Melun, Saint-Rieul de Senlis in Saint-Germain-l'Auxerrois. The sovereign goes further by offering pieces of relics to certain monks (a fragment of the chasuble of Saint Denis to Helgaud of Fleury). We also know that around 1015–1018, at the request of his wife Constance, Robert II ordered the making of a reliquary for Saint Savinien for the altar of the relics of the Abbey of Saint-Pierre-le-Vif near Sens. According to legend, Saint Savinian would have protected the integrity of the royal marriage when Robert II had gone to Rome with his former wife Bertha before leaving her definitively. The order is made from one of the best monk-silversmiths in the kingdom, Odorannus. In total, the sacred object is composed of 900 grams of gold and 5 kilograms of silver. In total, the inventory is impressive: during his reign Robert II offers a quantity of copes, priestly vestments, tablecloths, vases, chalices, crosses and censers. One of the gifts that most marks the contemporaries is probably the Évangéliaire dits de Gaignières, produced by Nivardus, a Lombard artist, on behalf of the Abbey of Fleury (beginning of the 11th century).

==== Chosen by the Lord ====
The definition of royalty in the time of Robert II is difficult to appreciate nowadays. The king only has precedence over the princes of the Frankish kingdom. Some like Odo II of Blois (in 1023), although respect is in order, make it clear to him that they wish to govern as they please without his consent. A prince respects the sovereign but he does not feel his subordinate. At the same time, however, the king tends to impose himself as Primus inter pares, the first of the princes. Moreover, the texts dating from the first part of the 11th century largely evoke loyalty to the king from the princes.

One day in 1027, a "rain of blood" fell on the Duchy of Aquitaine. The phenomenon worried enough contemporaries for William V of Aquitaine to explain it as a divine sign. The Duke then decided to send messengers to meet Robert II so that the latter asks the best scholars of his court for an explanation and advice. Gauzlin, Abbot of Fleury and Archbishop of Bourges, and Fulbert of Chartres take the matter in hand. Gauzlin answers that "the blood always announces a misfortune which will befall the Church and the population, but that after will come divine mercy". As for Fulbert, better documented, he analyzes the old historiæ (the works which relate the past facts):

"I found Titus Livius, Valerius, Orosius and several others relating this event; in the circumstances I contented myself with producing the testimony of Gregory, Bishop of Tours, because of his religious authority."

— Fulbert of Chartres, Lettre au roi Robert, 1027. (Note: In fact, it is a sandstorm coming from the Sahara, an unusual fact at the time therefore of divine origin.)

Fulbert concludes from Gregory of Tours (Histoire des Francs, VII), that only the ungodly and fornicators "will die for eternity in their blood, if they have not amended themselves beforehand". Friend of Bishop Fulbert, William V of Aquitaine could have addressed him directly. Now, aware that Robert II is the Lord's chosen one, it is from him, responsible for the entire kingdom, that we must seek advice. He is in the best position to know the mysteries of the world and the will of God. In the 11th century, even the most powerful men respect the order established by God, that is to say to pray to his sovereign".

The history of royal magical powers was dealt with by Marc Bloch in his work The Thaumaturge Kings (1924). During the early Middle Ages, the power to work miracles was strictly reserved for God, saints and relics. In the Merovingian times, was the mention of pious Guntram, mentioned by Gregory of Tours (6th century) and considered the first Frankish king healer. During the reign of Henry I, in the middle of the 11th century, we begin to tell Saint-Benoît-sur-Loire that Robert II had the gift of healing the wounds of certain diseases affecting them. Helgaud of Fleury writes in his Epitoma vitæ regis Roberti pii:

"[...] This man of God had no horror of them [lepers], for he had read in the Holy Scriptures that often our Lord Jesus had received hospitality in the figure of a leper. He went to them, approached them with eagerness, gave them the money with his own hand, kissed their hands with his mouth [...]. Moreover, divine virtue conferred on this holy man such grace for the healing of bodies that by touching the sick with the place of their wounds with his pious hand, and imprinting thereon the sign of the cross, he removed all pain from the disease."

— Helgaud of Fleury, Epitoma vitæ regis Roberti pii, ca. 1033.

Indeed, Robert II is the first sovereign of his line to be credited with thaumaturgical talent. Perhaps this was a propaganda with the purpose of a symbolic compensation for the weakness of royal power; not being able to impose itself by force (for example in the episode with Odo II of Blois in 1023), the monarchy had to find an alternative to impose its primacy. Nevertheless, this first thaumaturgy is recognized as "generalist", that is to say that the king was not specialized in such or such disease as will be the case for his successors with the scrofula. Not much is known about Robert II's magical actions except that he would have cured lepers in the South during his journey from 1018 to 1020. The King of the Franks is not the only one to use this kind of practice, his contemporary Edward the Confessor does the same in England. According to popular tradition, the king's blood conveys a capacity to work miracles, a gift which is reinforced by the royal coronation. Finally, according to Jacques Le Goff, no document proves that the French sovereigns regularly practiced touching scrofula before Saint Louis. In 1031 Robert II also came on pilgrimage to the Abbey of Saint-Géraud d'Aurillac to visit the relics of Saint Gerald and the cradle of Gerbert, of which he had been a disciple.

=== Robert II and the economy ===
==== A period of full economic growth ====
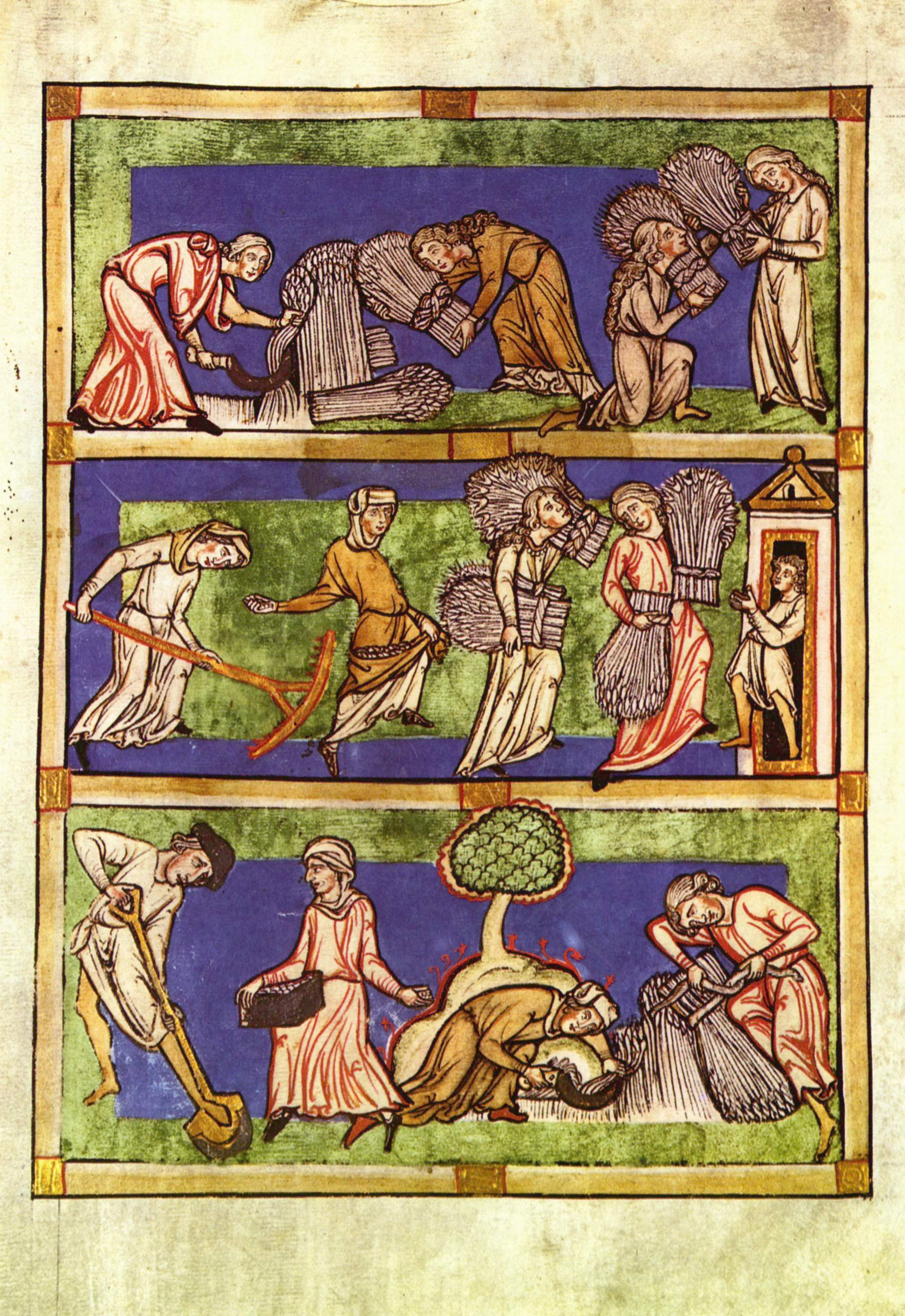
Fragment (single leaf) of a Speculum Viriginum ms., late 13th or early 14th century. The illustration showing the "Three Conditions of Woman", viz. virgins, widows and married wives, in a harvest allegory; the virgins reap hundredfold, the widows sixtyfold, the wives thirtyfold. Bonn, Rheinisches Landesmuseum.

If the 9th century looting have significantly slowed the economy, it is sustained expansion from the 10th century. Indeed, with the establishment of a decentralized defense, the Banal Lordship brought a response well adapted to the rapid Saracen or Viking raids. It becomes more profitable for thieves to settle in an area, get a tribute against the tranquility of the population and trade, rather than wage war, and this from the 10th century. The Vikings thus participate fully in the process of feudalisation and in the economic expansion which accompanies it. They must dispose of their booty, and they mint coins from the precious metals that were hoarded in looted religious goods. This cash, which is reinjected into the economy, is a leading catalyst for the ongoing economic transformation. The global money supply increases as much as with the weakening of the central power more and more bishops and princes coin money. However, the growing monetization of the economy is a powerful catalyst: farmers can take advantage of their agricultural surpluses and are motivated to increase their production capacity through the use of new techniques and the increase in cultivable areas through land clearing. The establishment of common law contributes to this development because the producer must generate enough profits to be able to pay the taxes. The lords also reinject this cash into the economy because one of the main criteria for belonging to the nobility in full structuring is to have a broad and expensive behavior towards its counterparts (this behavior being moreover necessary for ensure the loyalty of its militias).

In fact, in certain regions, the mottes play a pioneering role in the agrarian conquest of the saltus. During this time, were also developed more constantly the Thiérache, it is "to the clearing of land returned to the forest that the first castral movement is linked". In Cinglais, a region south of Caen, the primitive castles had settled on the borders of forest complexes. In all cases, the castral establishment on the outskirts of the village is very common. This phenomenon is part of a very anchored and ancient linear population which is juxtaposed with an early clearing that was certainly Carolingian well prior to the castral phenomenon. Nonetheless, the charters of northern France confirmed an intensive clearing activity still present until the middle of the 12th century and even beyond.

On the other hand, the lords as well as the clergy saw the interest in stimulating and benefiting from this economic expansion: they favored the clearing and the construction of new villages, and they invested in equipment increasing production capacities (mills, presses, ovens, plows, etc.) and transport (bridges, roads, etc.). Especially since these infrastructures can increase the income banal, levy tolls and tonlieus. In fact, increased trade leads to the proliferation of roads and markets (the network that is set up is immensely denser and ramified than what could have existed in Antiquity). These bridges, villages and markets are therefore built under the protection of a lord which is materialized by a castle mound. The power squire filter exchanges of any kind that amplify from the 11th century. We see many castras located on important roads, sources of a considerable financial contribution for the lord of the place. For Picardy, Robert Fossier noticed that nearly 35% of the sites that can be located in village lands are located on or near Roman roads, and that 55% of road and river nodes had fortified points.

==== Monetary Policy ====
The silver denarius is, as we have seen, one of the main engines of economic growth since the 9th century. The weakness of royal power led to the minting of coins by many bishops, lords and abbeys. While Charles the Bald had 26 coinage workshops, Hugh Capet and Robert II only have that of Laon. The reign of Hugh Capet marks the apogee of the feudalization of money. The result is a decrease in the uniformity of the denarius and the appearance of the practice of remapping money on the markets (we rely on the weight of the coin to determine its value). On the other hand, we are in a period where the increase in trade is supported by the increase in the volume of metal available. Indeed, the expansion towards the east of the Holy Roman Empire allows the Ottonian dynasty to be able to exploit new deposits of silver. Robert II has little room for maneuver. However, the practice of trimming or mutations, leads to devaluations that are quite harmful. However upholding the Peace of God, Robert II supports the fight against these abuses. The Order of Cluny who, like other abbeys mint their currency, have every interest in limiting these practices. Therefore, during the 10th century in the South, users must commit to not cut or falsifying currencies and issuers undertake not to take pretext of war to pursue a monetary transfer.

=== Robert II and the State ===
==== The royal administration ====
Is known that since around 992, Robert II has exercised the royal power transmitted by his aging father Hugh Capet. Historians thus show that the first Capetians begin to give up power around the age of 50, by tradition but also because the life expectancy of a sovereign at that time is around 55–60 years. Robert II followed this tradition in 1027, his son Henry I in 1059 and his grandson Philip I in 1100. In the image of his father and in the Carolingian tradition of Hincmar of Reims, Robert II takes advice from the ecclesiastics, something that was no longer done, to the great regret of the clerics, since the last Carolingians. This policy is taken up and theorized by Abbo of Fleury. From the time he was still associated with Hugh Capet, Robert II could write from Gerbert of Aurillac's pen:

"Not wishing in any way to abuse the royal power, we decide all the affairs of the res publica by resorting to the advice and sentences of our faithful ones."

— Gerbert of Aurillac, Letter to the Archbishop of Sens, ca. 987.

The term that comes up most often in royal charters is that of "common good" (res publica), a concept taken from Roman Antiquity. The king is thus the guarantor, from the height of his supreme magistracy, of the well-being of all his subjects.

The royal administration is known to us through the archives and in particular through the content of the royal diplomas. As for his father, Robert II record both a continuity with the previous era and a break. Historiography has truly changed his perspective on administration in Robert II's day over the past fifteen years. Since the thesis of Jean-François Lemarignier was thought that the space in which the diplomas were shipped had tended to shrink during the 11th century: "the decline is observed between 1025–1028 and 1031 to the various points of view of qualification categories". But the historian affirmed that, starting from Hugh Capet and even more under Robert II, the charters included more and more foreign subscriptions (signatures) than the traditional royal chancellery: thus the châtelains and even simple knights mingled with the counts and bishops until then predominant and outnumbered them at the end of the reign. The king would no longer have been sufficient to guarantee his own acts.

More recently, Olivier Guyotjeannin has brought to light a whole different perspective on the administration of Robert II. The introduction and multiplication of subscriptions and witness lists at the bottom of the acts sign, according to him, rather a new deal in the systems of evidence. The royal acts by addressees and by a chancellery reduced to a few people still consist for half of them, of a Carolingian-type diplomatic (monogram, Carolingian forms) until around 1010. The preambles change slightly under the chancellor Baudouin from 1018 but there is still "political Augustinism and the idea of the king as protector of the Church". Above all, underlines the historian, the royal acts drawn up by Robert II's chancellery do not open until very late and very partially to signatures foreign to those of the king and the chancellor. On the other hand, in the second part of the reign, one notes some acts with multiple subscriptions: for example in the act delivered at the Flavigny Abbey (1018), was notes the signum of six bishops, of Prince Henry, of Count Odo II of Blois, of Count Otto of Vermandois and some later additions. It seems nevertheless that the knights and the small counts present in the charters are not the rebellious squires of the traditional historiography but rather the members of a local network woven around the abbeys and the bishoprics held by the king. Clearly, the changes in royal acts from the end of Robert II's reign do not reflect a decline in kingship.

==== Justice of Robert II ====
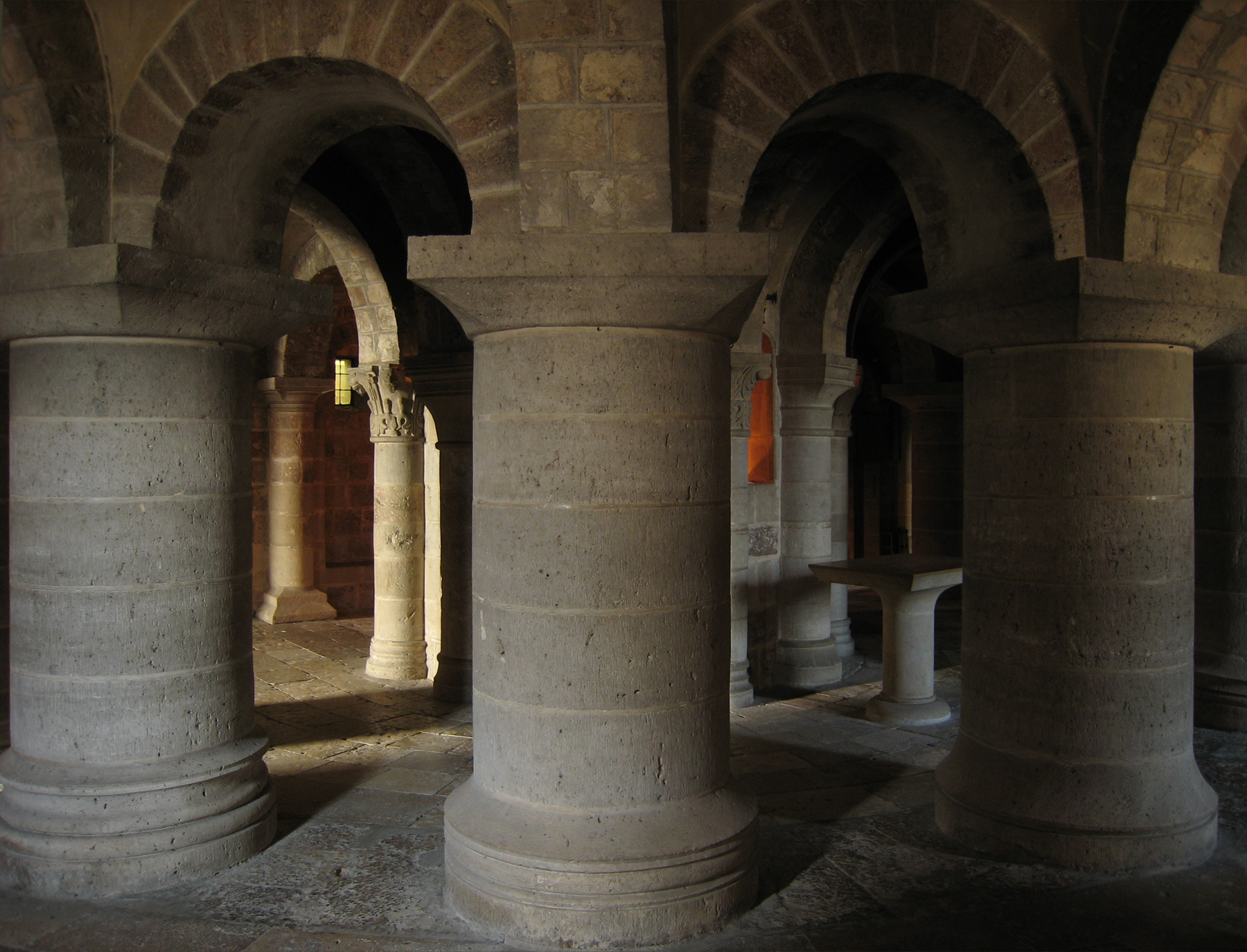
Crypt of Fleury Abbey at Saint-Benoît-sur-Loire, first third of the 11th century.

Since the end of the 10th century, the formulation of royal ideology is the work of monastic world, especially in the highly dynamic Fleury Abbey, located in Saint-Benoît-sur-Loire. In the theory of Abbo of Fleury (ca. 993–994), the concern of the sovereign of the year 1000 is to make equity and justice reign, to guarantee peace and harmony in the Kingdom. Its purpose is to safeguard Capetian memory for centuries. For their part, the territorial princes of the 11th century know what founds and legitimizes their power even in their royal aspects. The presence of a royal authority in the Kingdom of the Franks remains essential for contemporaries. However, Abbo also emphasizes in his writings the need of a local ruler who could exercise his office for the common good, deciding matters with the consent of the advisers (bishops and princes). However, Robert II did not always follow, to his great fault, this theory, in particular in the case of the succession of the Counties of Meaux and Troyes (1021–1024).

Since the beginning of the reign of Robert II, the Counties of Meaux and Troyes were in the hands of a powerful figure, his second cousin once removed (Note: Stephen I of Troyes' great-grandmother was Adelais, a sister of Hugh the Great, Robert II's grandfather.) Count Stephen I of Troyes. In 1019, Stephen I appealed to the Robert II's generosity, asking him to confirm the restitution of property to the Abbey of Lagny. The king accepted, but Stephen I died ca. 1021–1023; a rare occurrence at the time, he had no clearly named successor or heir. Robert II is responsible for managing the succession, which he cedes without difficulty to Count Odo II of Blois, a lord already well-established in the region (he hold the cities of Épernay, Reims, Vaucouleurs and Commercy) and moreover was a second cousin (Note: Stephen I of Troyes' grandfather Robert of Vermandois was a brother of Luitgarde, Odo II of Blois' grandmother.) of Stephen I. However, a few months later a crisis breaks out. Ebles I of Roucy, Archbishop of Reims informs the king of the bad actions of Odo II who monopolizes all powers in Reims to the detriment of the prelate. Robert II, as a defender of the Church, decides, without the consent of anyone, to withdraw the comital title of Reims from Odo II. The latter, furious, imposes himself in Reims by force. In addition, the king is not supported, his justice is undermined: even his faithfuls Fulbert of Chartres and Duke Richard II of Normandy support Odo II by arguing that Robert II should not behave like a "tyrant". Summoned by the king in 1023, Odo II courteously informs that he will not move and Robert II has neither the means to oblige him nor the right to seize his patrimony, because these lands weren't granted by the king but inherited from his ancestors by the will of the Lord.

After this event (which weakened his already unstable authority), Robert II does not repeat the same mistake. In 1024, after a meeting of the greats of the Kingdom in Compiègne who suggested appeasement to him with Odo II of Blois, the King had to confirm the Count's possessions. A few years later, in May 1027, Dudon, Abbot of Montier-en-Der, publicly complains of the violent usurpation exercised by Stephen of Vaux, Lord of Joinville. The latter seized seven churches to the detriment of the monastery of which he is however the advocatus. Robert II once again takes charge of the affair, and taking advantage of the coronation of his second son Henry at Pentecost of 1027 in Reims, he summons the Lord of Joinville to his court. The latter does not travel for the event. The present assembly, composed among others by Ebles I of Roucy, Odilo of Cluny, Dudon of Montier-en-Der, William V of Aquitaine and Odo II, unanimously decides to launch the anathema on the Lord of Joinville. In short, Robert II is not the weak king that historiography has always presented. Of course, his decisions in matters of justice must take into account the advice of ecclesiastics and territorial princes, but he remains as the Primer inter pares, that is to say the first among his peers.

== Family ==
Firstly, in 988, he married Rozala, daughter of King Berengar II of Italy. The union did not produce any children. He married in 996 Bertha, daughter of King Conrad I of Burgundy and Matilda of France. This marriage was also childless.

Around 1001/1003, after Robert divorced Bertha, he married Constance of Arles, daughter of Count William I of Provence. Constance and Robert had seven children:

- Hedwig, who became countess of Nevers
- Hugh Magnus, co-king of France
- Henry I, who succeeded his father
- Adela, who became countess of Flanders
- Robert, who became duke of Burgundy
- Odo
- Constance, who married Count Manasses of Dammartin

== Sources ==
- Adair, Penelope Ann (2003). "Constance of Arles: A Study in Duty and Frustration". In Nolan, Kathleen D. (ed.). Capetian Women. Palgrave Macmillan.
- Angold, Michael (2002). "Knowledge of Byzantine History in the West: the Norman Historians (Eleventh and Twelfth Centuries)". In Gillingham, John (ed.). Anglo-Norman Studies. Vol. XXV. The Boydell Press. pp. 19–34.
- Bachrach, Bernard S. (1993). Fulk Nerra, the Neo-Roman Consul 987–1040: A Political Biography of the Angevin Count. University of California Press.
- Barthélemy, Dominique (1990). L'Ordre seigneurial, XIe–XIIe siècle (in French). Paris: Seuil. ISBN 978-2-02-011554-4.
- —— (1997). La mutation de l'an Mil a-t-elle eu lieu ? Servage et chevalerie dans la France des Xe–XIe siècle (in French). Paris: Fayard. ISBN 978-2-213-59998-4.
- —— (1999). "L'An mil et la paix de Dieu". La France chrétienne et féodale (980–1060) (in French). Paris: Fayard. ISBN 978-2-213-60429-9.
- Bautier, Robert-Henri (1992). "L'avènement d'Hugues Capet et de Robert le Pieux". Le roi de France et son royaume autour de l'an mil (in French). Paris: Picard. pp. 27–37.
- Berlioz, Jacques (1990). "Les Terreurs de l'an mil ont-elles vraiment existé ?". L'Histoire (in French) (138): 16–18.
- Bonnassie, Pierre (1990). "D'une servitude à l'autre: Les paysans du royaume 987–1031". La France de l'an Mil (in French). Paris: Seuil.
- Bouchard, Constance Brittain (1981). "Consanguinity and Noble Marriages in the Tenth and Eleventh Centuries". Speculum. 56.2 (April) (2): 268–287. doi:10.2307/2846935. JSTOR 2846935. PMID 11610836. S2CID 38717048.
- —— (1987). Sword, Miter, and Cloister: Nobility and the Church in Burgundy, 980–1188. Cornell University Press.
- —— (2001). Those of My Blood: Creating Noble Families in Medieval Francia. University of Pennsylvania Press.
- Bourin, Monique; Parisse, Michel (1999). L'Europe en l'an Mil (in French). Paris: Librairie générale française. ISBN 978-2-253-90564-6.
- Chevalier, C. (1872). Cartulaire de l'Abbaye de Noyers (in French). Tours: Guilland-Verger, Georget-Joubert. pp. charter I.
- Contamine, Philippe; Bompaire, Marc; Lebecq, Stéphane; Sarrazin, Jean-Luc (2004). L'Économie médiévale (in French). Armand Colin.
- de Fleury, Helgaud (1824). Vie du roi Robert le Pieux (Epitoma vitæ regis Roberti pii) (in French). Translated by François Guizot. Paris: Brière. – There is also a more recent translation produced by Robert-Henri Bautier, CNRS, Paris, 1993.
- Fawtier, Robert (1989). The Capetian Kings of France. Translated by Butler, Lionel; Adam, R.J. Macmillan.
- Gauvard, Claude (1996). La France au Moyen Âge du Ve au XVe siècle (in French). Paris: Presses Universitaires de France. ISBN 2-13-054205-0.
- Goetz, Hans-Werner (1992). "La paix de Dieu en France autour de l'an Mil: fondements et objectifs, diffusions et participants". Le roi de France et son royaume autour de l'an Mil. Paris: Picard.
- Iogna-Prat, Dominique (1990). Religion et culture autour de l'an Mil (in French). Paris: Picard. ISBN 978-2-7084-0392-5.
- Lauranson-Rosaz, Christian (2002). Paix de Dieu. Paris: Dictionnaire du Moyen Âge, Presses Universitaires de France. pp. 1035–1037.
- Lewis, Andrew W. (October 1978). "Anticipatory Association of the Heir in Early Capetian France". The American Historical Review. 83 (4): 906–927. doi:10.2307/1867651. JSTOR 1867651.
- Lévêque, Pierre (1996). La Côte-d'Or de la Préhistoire à nos jours (in French). Bordessoules: Editions Bourdessoules. ISBN 978-2-903504-43-4.
- MacCulloch, Diarmaid (2010). A History of Christianity. Penguin Books.
- Menant, François (1999). Les Capétiens. Histoire et dictionnaire. 987–1328 (in French). Paris: Robert Laffont. ISBN 978-2-221-05687-5.
- Nicholas, David (1992). Medieval Flanders. Longman.
- Palmer, James (2014). The Apocalypse in the Early Middle Ages. Cambridge University Press.
- Parisse, Michel (1990). "Qu'est-ce que la France de l'an Mil?". La France de l'an Mil (in French). Paris: Seuil. pp. 29–48.
- Pfister, Charles (1885). Etudes sur le règne de Robert le Pieux (in French). Paris. pp. 41–69.
- Richard, Jean (1954). Les ducs de Bourgogne et la formation du duché du XI e au XIV e siècle. Publications de l'Université de Dijon, XII (in French). Les Belles Lettres. OL 15221463M.
- Sassier, Yves (1987). Hugues Capet (in French). Paris: Fayard. ISBN 978-2-213-01919-2.
- —— (2000). "Royauté et idéologie au Moyen Âge". Bas-empire, monde franc, France, IVe–XIIe siècle (in French). Paris: Colin. ISBN 978-2-200-01656-2.
- Theis, Laurent (1990). "Nouvelle histoire de la France médiévale". L'Héritage des Charles: De la mort de Charlemagne aux environs de l'an mil – Points. Histoire (in French). 2 (202). Paris: Seuil. ISBN 978-2-02-011553-7.
- —— (1999). "Robert le Pieux". Le roi de l'an mil (in French). Paris: Perrin. ISBN 978-2-262-01375-2.
- Vasiliev, Aleksandr Aleksandrovich (1951). "Hugh Capet of France and Byzantium". Dumbarton Oaks Papers. 6: 227–251. doi:10.2307/1291087. JSTOR 1291087.
- Werner, Karl Ferdinand (1990). "Dieu, les rois et l'Histoires". La France de l'an Mil (in French). Paris: Seuil.

Robert II of France House of Capet Born: 27 March 972 Died: 20 July 1031
Regnal titles
Preceded by Hugh	King of the Franks; 987–1031 with Hugh Capet as senior king (987–996); Hugh as junior king (1017–1026); Henry I as junior king (1027–1031)	Succeeded by Henry I
Preceded by Otto William	Duke of Burgundy; 1004–1016	Succeeded by Henry I
