= Raynald II of Nevers =

Renauld II, Count of Nevers and Auxerre (died 1089) was the son of William I of Nevers, Count of Nevers and Ermengarde of Tonnerre.

He married Ida, daughter of Artald V, Count of Forez. They had a child:

- Ermengarde of Nevers, who married Miles, Sire of Courtenay, son of Joscelin de Courtenay and Isabel, daughter of Guy I of Montlhéry.

Later he married Agnes of Beaugency. They had:

- William II, Count of Nevers, d.1149
- Robert
