= Helgaud =

French Benedictine monk and historian

Helgaud or Helgaldus (d. c. 1048), French historian and biographer, was a monk of the Benedictine Abbey of Fleury.

Little else is known about him save that he was chaplain to the French king, Robert II the Pious, whose life (Vita) he wrote. Although earlier editors of this work of semi-hagiography expressed the opinion that "its value is not great either from the literary or from the historical point of view," it is now recognized as quite valuable, not only for the light it directly sheds on its subject, but also as representing an important phase in the development of medieval history writing.

The only existing manuscript of the Epitoma is found in Rome, Vatican, BAV Reg. lat. 566.

Earlier editions were reprinted by J. P. Migne in his Patrologia Latina, CXLI (Paris, 1844); and by M. Bouquet in the Recueil des historiens des Gaules, X (Paris, 1760), but the definitive edition (which includes a lengthy introduction and notes) appeared in 1965 by Robert-Henri Bautier and Gilette Labory (listed below).
