= Chronicle of Saint-Pierre-le-Vif of Sens =

Anonymous Latin chronicle

The Chronicle of Saint-Pierre-le-Vif of Sens (Latin: Chronicon Sancti Petri Vivi Senonensis, French: Chronique de Saint-Pierre-le-Vif de Sens) is an anonymous Latin chronicle written at the Abbey of Saint-Pierre-le-Vif in Sens between about 1100 and 1125 with continuations added into the 13th century. The original work was attributed to a monk named Clarius by Dom Victor Cottron in 1650, but this is not now accepted. It is, however, sometimes still labeled the Chronique dite de Clarius ("Chronicle said to be of Clarius"). The Chronicle is mainly a history of the abbey and of the city of Sens.

The Chronicle is divided into four sections. The first is a universal history inspired by Hugh of Flavigny and, through him, by Eusebius of Caesarea and Jerome. This covers the period from the birth of Jesus to the year 1100. The second section is a chronicle of Sens drawn from earlier chronicles, such as that of Odorannus and the Historia Francorum Senonensis. It covers the years 675–1096, although some of this material is dispersed throughout the universal history. The third section contains an account of the abbacy of Arnaud of Saint-Pierre-le-Vif (1096–1124) in the form of a series of annals. The fourth section contains a continuation of the annals down to 1180 and further continuations that take it down to 1290.

Abbot Arnaud commissioned the writing of the chronicle and the copying of the documents towards 1108. The Chronicle's most recent editors suggest that the years 1100–1108 in the annals of his abbacy reflect his own account in his own hand. The Chronicle survives in its original manuscript of 138 folios, now MS no. 212 in the municipal library of Auxerre. Of these, the first 104 contain the Chronicle while the remainder contain various documents copied from the abbey's archives. These include royal and papal charters, excerpted letters, canons of church councils, liturgy and lists of rents and renders owed the abbey.

One purpose of the Chronicle was to justify the abbey's rights, especially against the priory of Mauriac. Arnaud's extended dispute with the prior of Mauriac gets detailed treatment. To modern historians, the Chronicle is chiefly interesting for the light it sheds on the composition of a monastic history. It was copied late in the 12th century into the Pseudo-Godel Chronicle and in that guise was used as a source by the influential Robert of Auxerre.

== Editions ==
- Robert-Henri Bautier and Monique Gilles, eds. and transs., with Anne-Marie Bautier. Chronique de Saint-Pierre-le-Vif de Sens, dite de Clarius (Chronicon Sancti Petri Vivi Senonensis). Sources d'Histoire Medievale. Paris: CNRS, 1979.
