= Constance of Arles =

Queen of the Franks from 1003 to 1031

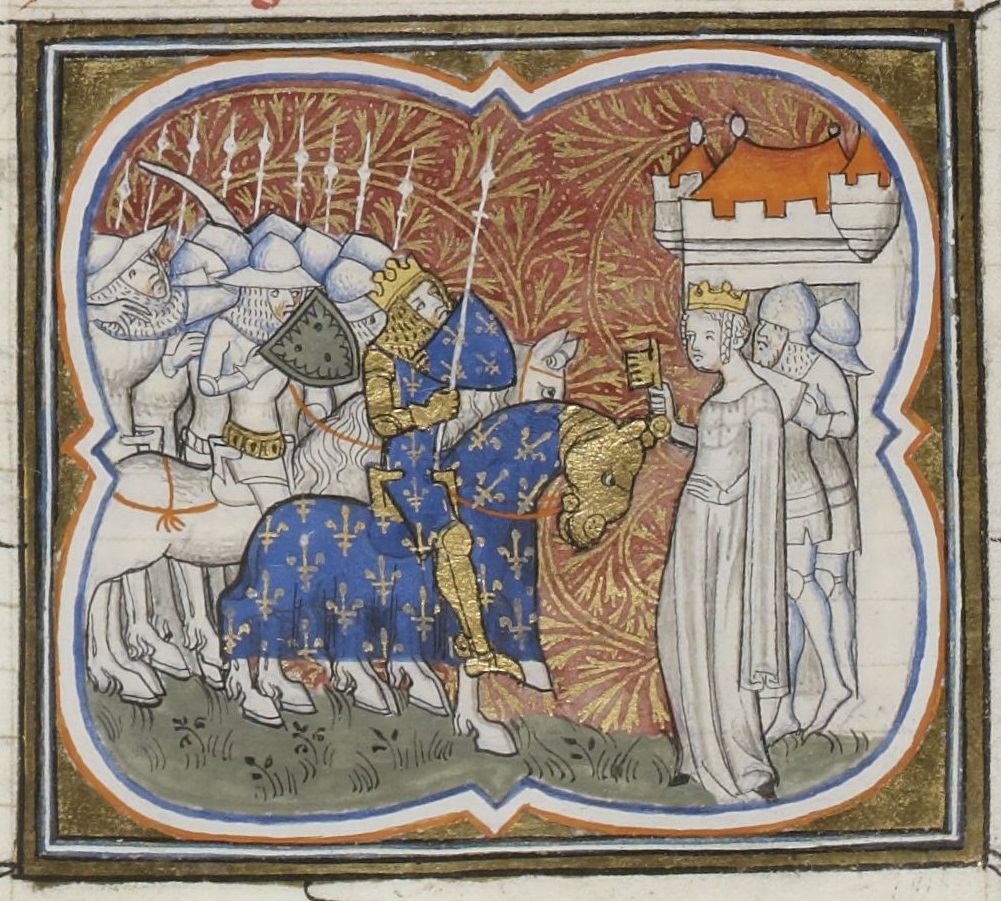
- Depiction of Constance surrendering to her son Henry I of France (c. 1375–1380).

Queen consort of the Franks
- Tenure: 1003–1031
- Born: c. 986; Arles, France
- Died: 28 July 1032; Melun, France
- Burial: Saint Denis Basilica, Paris, France
- Spouse: Robert II of France (died 1031)
- Issue: Advisa, Countess of Nevers; Hugh Magnus; Henry I, King of France; Adela, Countess of Flanders; Robert I, Duke of Burgundy; Eudes of France; Constance, Countess of Dammartin
- House: Bosonids
- Father: William I, Count of Provence
- Mother: Adelaide-Blanche of Anjou

Constance of Arles (c. 986 – 28 July 1032), also known as Constance of Provence, was Queen of France as the third wife of King Robert II of France.

== Life ==
Born c. 986 Constance was the daughter of William I, Count of Provence and Adelaide-Blanche of Anjou, daughter of Fulk II of Anjou. She was the sister of Count William II of Provence. Constance was married to King Robert, after his divorce from his second wife, Bertha of Burgundy. The marriage was stormy; Bertha's family opposed her, and Constance was despised for importing her Provençal kinfolk and customs. Robert's friend, Hugh of Beauvais, count palatine, tried to convince the king to repudiate her in 1007. Possibly at her request 12 knights of her kinsman Fulk Nerra then murdered Beauvais in 1008.

In 1010 Robert went to Rome, followed by his former wife Bertha, to seek permission to divorce Constance and remarry Bertha. Pope Sergius IV was not about to allow a consanguineous marriage which had been formally condemned by Pope Gregory V and Robert had already repudiated two wives. So the request was denied. After his return according to one source Robert "loved his wife more."

In 1022, a trial accused clergy members of heresy, Constance's previous confessor Stephen included. Robert had his wife Queen Constance stand at the door to prevent any mob violence. However, as the condemned clerics left the trial the queen "struck out the eye of Stephen... with the staff which she carried". This was seen as Constance venting her frustration at anyone subverting the prestige of the crown.

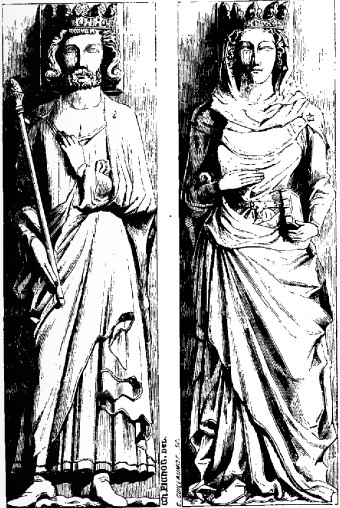
Tomb of Robert 'the Pious' and Constance of Arles at Saint-Denis

At Constance's urging, her eldest son Hugh Magnus was crowned co-king alongside his father in 1017. But later Hugh demanded his parents share power with him, and rebelled against his father in 1025. Constance, however, on learning of her son's rebellion was furious with him, rebuking him at every turn. At some point Hugh was reconciled with his parents but shortly thereafter died, probably about age eighteen. The royal couple was devastated; there was concern for the queen’s mental health due to the violence of her grief.

Robert and Constance quarrelled over which of their surviving sons should inherit the throne; Robert favored their second son Henry, while Constance favored their third son, Robert. Despite his mother's protests and her support by several bishops, Henry was crowned in 1027. Constance, however, was not graceful when she didn't get her way. The ailing Fulbert, bishop of Chartres told a colleague that he could attend the ceremony "if he traveled slowly to Reims—but he was too frightened of the queen to go at all".

Constance encouraged her sons to rebel, and they began attacking and pillaging the towns and castles belonging to their father. Her son Robert attacked Burgundy, the duchy he had been promised but had never received, and Henry seized Dreux. At last King Robert agreed to their demands and peace was made which lasted until the king's death.

King Robert died on 20 July 1031. Soon afterwards Constance fell ill; she was also at odds with both her surviving sons. Constance seized her dower lands and refused to surrender them. Henry fled to Normandy, where he received aid, weapons and soldiers from his brother Robert. He returned to besiege his mother at Poissy but Constance escaped to Pontoise. She only surrendered when Henry began the siege of Le Puiset and swore to slaughter all the inhabitants.

Constance died after passing out following a coughing fit on 28 July 1032 and was buried beside her husband Robert at Saint-Denis Basilica.

== Children ==
Constance and Robert had:

1. Advisa, Countess of Auxerre, married Count Renaud I of Nevers
2. Hugh Magnus, co-king
3. Henry I of France
4. Adela, Countess of Contenance, married Count Baldwin V of Flanders
5. Robert I, Duke of Burgundy
6. Eudes
7. Constance of France, married Manasses, Count of Dammartin and had issue.

== Sources ==
- Adair, Penelope Ann (2003). "Constance of Arles: A study in Duty and Frustration". In Nolan, Kathleen (ed.). Capetian Women. Palgrave Macmillan.
- Bouchard, Constance (2001). Those of My Blood: Creating Noble Families in Medieval Francia. University of Pennsylvania Press.
- Crisp, Ryan Patrick (2005). "Consanguinity and the Saint Aubin Genealogies". In Morillo, Stephen (ed.). The Haskins Society Journal 14: 2003. Studies in Medieval History. Vol. 14. The Boydell Press. pp. 105–116.
- Earenfight, Theresa (2013). Queenship in Medieval Europe. Palgrave Macmillan.
- Jessee, W. Scott (2000). Robert the Burgundian and the Counts of Anjou: ca. 1025-1098. Catholic University of America Press.
- Wright, Georgia Sommers (1974). "A Royal Tomb Program in the Reign of St. Louis". The Art Bulletin. 56, No. 2 (Jun.).

== Additional resources ==
- Jessee, W. Scott. A missing Capetian princess: Advisa, daughter of King Robert II of France (Medieval Prosopography), 1990
- Moore, R. I. The Birth of Popular Heresy, 1975.
- Lambert, Malcolm. Medieval Heresy: Popular Movements from the Gregorian Reform to the Reformation, 1991, 9 - 17.

French royalty
Preceded by Bertha of Burgundy	Queen consort of France; 1001–1031	Succeeded by Matilda of Frisia
