= Louis of Lower Lorraine =

Frankish royalty (975/980–1023)

Louis of Lower Lorraine (975/980 – 1023), Frankish royalty and a member of the Carolingian dynasty, was a younger son of Charles, Duke of Lower Lorraine, through his second wife, Adelaide.

Louis was born between 975 and 980, during the reign of his uncle, King Lothair of France. His mother was the daughter of a vassal of Hugh Capet. After the death of Louis's cousin, King Louis V, in 987, the nobility elected Hugh Capet king. Charles opposed Hugh, but was defeated in battle and captured in 991. Hugh had Louis placed in the custody of Bishop Adalbero of Laon. By 993, Charles had died and Hugh had imprisoned Louis in Orléans. Louis's older brother, Otto, who had remained behind in Germany, inherited their father's duchy.

In the spring of 993, Odo I, Count of Blois, plotted with Adalbero of Laon to arrest Hugh while the latter was in Metz to meet Otto III of Germany, and place Louis on the throne. The count of Blois was angered by Hugh's refusal to appoint him to Hugh's old office, Duke of the Franks. The plot, however, was leaked to the king and had to be abandoned.

At some point, Louis was released. He still retained land in Lower Lorraine and the Chronicle of Saint-Pierre-le-Vif calls him comes Alemanorum, "count of the Germans", suggesting that he had been granted a county in Lower Lorraine.

Sometime between 1005 and 1012, Louis was in Aquitaine when Duke William V of Aquitaine made a donation to the Abbey of Bourgueil. Louis subscribed the duke's charter as "Louis, son of King Charles" (Lodoici filii Karoli regis). William is known to have been on good terms with Hugh and accepted his election, but Carolingian legitimism was not unknown in southern France, where royal power was weak. Louis was being sheltered in Aquitaine as a possible pretender for the kingship.

In 1023, Louis made a pilgrimage to Mont-Saint-Michel. During his return journey, he fell ill and became a monk in extremis at the Abbey of Saint-Pierre-le-Vif in Sens. While he lay dying, he gave his villa at Ariscurt (an unidentified location probably in Lorraine) and a pallium (a sign of his royalty) to the abbey. His epitaph at Saint-Pierre-le-Vif has been published.
