= Leutard of Vertus =

10th- and 11th-century French peasant

Leutard of Vertus (died c. 1000) was a French peasant who was denounced as a heretic by the Roman Catholic Church. He is recorded in an account by the chronicler Rodulfus Glaber who states Leutard's beliefs began after dreaming his body had been invaded by bees. Leutard went on to deface a crucifix and speak out against church tithes. He was summoned by the Bishop of Châlons who spoke against Leutard's interpretation of scripture and persuaded his followers to return to the church's teachings. Leutard is afterwards said to have committed suicide by throwing himself down a well.

== Preaching ==
Leutard was a peasant who lived in Vertus, north-eastern France. He is recorded in an account by the Benedictine chronicler Rodulfus Glaber. According to Rodulfus "about the end of the year 1000" Leutard dreamt that his body was invaded by bees as he slept in a field. The bees entered Leutard's genitals, exited via his mouth and stung him all over. Leutard then claimed that the bees spoke to him; Rodulfus records that the bees ordered Leutard "to do things impossible for humankind".

Leutard interpreted the event as a mandate from God to preach the gospel. He soon after entered his parish church and defaced a crucifix, justifying the act to locals as being in accordance with a revelation from God. He was at first regarded as suffering from mental illness but began to win followers, particular by speaking out against the imposition of church tithes. He preached for a number of years but his doctrine is not known, except for his opposition to tithes and a position that only certain books of the Bible should be followed because some prophets "had said many good things they were not to be believed in everything". He left his wife after interpreting a passage of the Bible as permitting divorce without ecclesiastical approval.

== Denouncement and death ==
The Bishop of Châlons (either Gebuin I, d. 998, or Gebuin II, d. 1014), in whose diocese Vertus was located, summoned Leutard to appear before him. The bishop interrogated Leutard in front of his followers. Leutard quoted passages from the Bible in his defence to Gebuin but later stated he regretted this. The bishop exposed alleged faults in Leutard's interpretation of the Bible which persuaded Leutard's followers that he was in error.

Gebuin declared Leutard a heretic, but does not appear to have passed a death sentence upon him. The bishop stated that Leutard's followers would be brought back within the church. Leutard, abandoned by his former followers, is then said to have taken his own life by jumping down a well. This is one of few recorded instances of suicide in the early Middle Ages. The medieval scholar Michael Frasetto notes that the death of Leutard may mark a shift in medieval popular thought, towards considering death as the correct punishment for heresy, which was officially mandated by the church from the late 12th century.

Rodulfus (d.1047), writing in the years after the incident, describes Leutard as "an envoy of Satan". Leutard is the first known heretic from the diocese of Châlons, though others were denounced in the following centuries. Such beliefs caused sufficient concern by the 1040s that the bishop wrote to Wazo of Liège to discuss the matter.

== Modern assessment ==
R. I. Moore, Professor of History at Newcastle University, considers that Leutard may have been characterised as mentally ill by the church authorities to dissuade any popular support for tithe reform. He also notes that he may not technically have been a heretic; the only assertion made by Rodulfus as to Leutard's beliefs was his opposition to the tithes, a non-Scriptural matter.

Austrian medievalist Heinrich Fichtenau proposes that the incident with the bees may have been an embellishment added by Rodulfus. He also notes that despite Leutard's desire to appear learned it is unlikely that a peasant in this period would have been literate and probably that Leutard was repeating passages told by other people. Fichtenau considers Leutard's destruction of the crucifix as evidence for a possible belief in the rejection of the image of Christ's torture as a central element of worship. This belief was associated with Bogomilism and the Leutard incident may demonstrate a spread of these beliefs from the Balkans to France. Geoffrey Koziol, Professor of History at University of California, Berkeley considers Leutard's actions indicate a belief in the rejection of the church as the official interpreter of the word of God and in its role in granting and annulling marriages.

American historian Brian Stock suggests Leutard's preachings might have been anti-feudal in stance or an early form of Catharism; the latter interpretation also being put forward by Henry Charles Lea in the 19th century. Stock considers that the bees in the story might be symbolic as a representation of chastity, of diabolical thought entering the body or a portent of Leutard's appeal to the masses.

Though not considered such at the time, American historian Richard Landes wrote that Leutard was something of a messianic figure, connected with millenarianism. Landes suggests that Rodulfus modelled Leutard's story on that of the "false Christ" described by Gregory of Tours, a labourer driven mad by flies. Landes considers the bees represent the traumatic experience common among messiah figures.
