= William I of Nevers =

French Count

William I
- Count of Nevers
- Born: c. 1029
- Died: 20 June 1100; Nevers
- Spouse: Ermengarde of Tonnerre
- Issue: Renauld II, Count of Nevers; William II, Count of Tonnerre; Robert; Ermengarde; Helvise
- Father: Renauld I, Count of Nevers
- Mother: Hedwig of France, Countess of Nevers

William I, Count of Nevers (French: Guillaume I^{er}, c. 1029 – 20 June 1100), was the son of Renauld I, Count of Nevers and Hedwig of France, Countess d'Auxerre. He married Ermengarde, daughter of Renauld, Count of Tonnerre about 1039. William died in 1098.

William I and Ermengarde had:

1. Renauld II (d. 1089), succeeded his father as Count of Nevers and Count of Auxerre.
2. William II, succeeded his father as Count of Tonnerre
3. Robert (d. 1095), later Bishop of Auxerre
4. Ermengarde (d. 1090–95), married Hubert de Beaumont-au-Maine, Viscount of Maine
5. Helvise, married William, Count of Évreux

== Sources ==
- Bouchard, Constance Brittain (1987). Sword, Miter, and Cloister:Nobility and the Church in Burgundy, 980-1198. Cornell University Press.
