= Hedwig of France, Countess of Nevers =

Daughter of Robert II of France

Hedwig (or Advisa) of France (c. 1003–1063) was a French princess, the daughter of Robert II of France and Constance of Arles. She married Renauld I, Count of Nevers, on 25 January 1016, and they had the following children:

- William I of Nevers (c. 1030-1083/1097)
- Henry of Nevers (died 1067)
- Guy (died 1067)
- Robert, Baron of Craon (c. 1035-1098)
- Adelaide
