= Raynald I of Nevers =

Renauld I, Count of Nevers

Count of Nevers
- Reign: 1028 - 1040
- Predecessor: Landry, Count of Nevers
- Successor: William I
- Died: 29 May 1040; Seignelay (Yonne), France
- Spouse: Hedwig of France (m. 1016)
- Issue Detail: William I of Nevers; Henry of Nevers; Guy of Nevers; Robert, baron of Craon; Adelaide of Nevers
- Father: Landerich of Monceau
- Mother: Matilda of Mâcon

Renauld I (died 29 May 1040) was a French nobleman. He was the Count of Nevers and Count of Auxerre from 1028 until his death at the battle of Seignelay against Robert I, Duke of Burgundy.

== Family ==
Renauld was the son of Landerich of Monceau and Matilda of Mâcon.

=== Marriage ===
He married Hedwig (or Advisa) of France on 25 January 1016, daughter of Robert II, King of France and Constance of Arles.

=== Children ===
- William I of Nevers (c. 1030–1083/1097)
- Henry of Nevers (died 1067)
- Guy of Nevers (died 1067)
- Robert of Nevers Baron of Craon (c. 1035–1098)
- Adelaide of Nevers

== Sources ==
- Bouchard, Constance Brittain (1987). Sword, Miter, and Cloister: Nobility and the Church in Burgundy, 980-1188. Cornell University Press.
- Jessee, W. Scott (2000). Robert the Burgundian and the Counts of Anjou, Ca. 1025-1098. The Catholic University of America.
