= Adalberon (bishop of Laon) =

French bishop and poet (died 1030/1031)

Adalberon, or Ascelin (died 19 July 1030/1031), was a French bishop and poet. He was a son of Reginar of Bastogne, the son of Gozlin, Count of Bidgau and Methingau, the son of Count Palatine Wigeric of Lotharingia.

Adalberon's uncle is Adalberon, Archbishop of Reims.

He studied at Reims and was in the chapter of Metz Cathedral. He became bishop of Laon in 977.

The chronicler Richer of Rheims reports an accusation of 977 against him of adultery, with Queen Emma of Italy. Emma's son Louis V of France removed him from Laon in 981.

When Laon was taken by Charles, Duke of Lower Lorraine, in 988, Adalberon was put into prison, whence he escaped and sought the protection of Hugh Capet, king of France. Winning the confidence of Charles of Lorraine and of Arnulf, archbishop of Reims, he was restored to his see; but in 991 he gave Laon, together with Charles and Arnulf, into the hands of Hugh Capet.

Subsequently, he took an active part in ecclesiastical affairs, and died on July 19, 1030/1031.

== Works ==
Adalberon wrote a satirical poem, Carmen ad Rotbertum regem, in the form of a dialogue dedicated to Robert II of France, in which he argued against contemporary episcopal and monastic reform (such as the Cluniac Reforms). He showed his dislike of Odilo, Abbot of Cluny, and his followers, and his objection to persons of humble birth being made bishops. Versions include:

- Carozzi, Claude (ed. and trans.). Adalberon de Laon. Poème au roi Robert. Les classiques de l'histoire de France au moyen âge 32. Paris, 1979.
- Migne, J.P. (ed.). Patrologia Latina, vol. 141. Paris, 1844. Transcription available from Documenta Catholica Omnia
- Valois, H. (ed.). Carmen panegyricum in laudem Berengarii. Paris, 1663. First (modern) publication of the poem.

Diagram of the three orders

He seems to be famous in French history because of a poem in which he made mention of (the) three orders in society : "oratores, bellatores, laboratores" : the clergy ("praying Church"), nobles and chivalry ("the fighting church"), and, third, the labouring people ("church of toiling"), the last one supporting the others, and all supporting the whole edifice of mankind. This idea was incorporated into the "three social orders" of the Ancien Régime in France.

== Secondary sources ==
- Histoire de la France, ed. George Duby, Larousse 1988, vol I, p. 301;
- Franco Cardini, in The Medieval World, ed. Jacques le Goff, 1987, Eng. transl. 1990, Collins & Brown, p. 75.
