= Hugh of France (son of Robert II) =

Hugh II Magnus
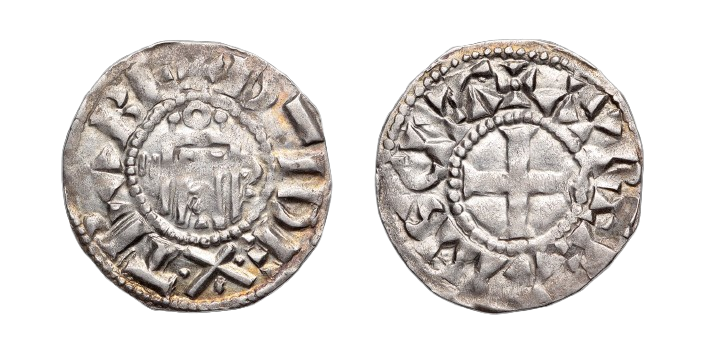
- Denier of Hugues minted in Orléans.

King of the Franks
- Reign: 19 June 1017 – 17 September 1025
- Coronation: 19 June 1017, church of St Corneille, Compiègne
- Predecessor: Robert II
- Successor: Robert II
- Senior king: Robert II
- Born: 1007
- Died: 17 September 1025 (age 17-18); Compiègne
- Burial: St Corneille
- House: House of Capet
- Father: Robert II of France
- Mother: Constance of Arles

Hugh (French: Hugues, 1007 – 17 September 1025), sometimes called Hugh the Great, was co-king of France under his father, Robert II, from 1017 until his death in 1025. He was a member of the House of Capet, a son of Robert II by his third wife, Constance of Arles.

The first Capetian King of France, Hugh Capet, had ensured his family's succession to the throne by having his son, Robert II, crowned and accepted as King during his own lifetime; father and son had ruled together as King thenceforth until Hugh Capet's death. Robert II, when his son was old enough, determined to do the same. Hugh Magnus was thus crowned King of France on 9/19 June 1017. However, when older, he rebelled against Robert.

Hugh died, perhaps of a fall from his horse, at Compiègne in 1025 while preparing a rebellion against his father, aged around 18 years old.

Rodulfus Glaber was fulsome in his praise of the young king, writing: "My pen cannot express all of the great and good qualities that he showed...in all things he was better than the best. No elegy can ever equal his merits."

== Sources ==
- Heraldica

Hugh of France (son of Robert II) House of Capet Born: 1007 Died: 17 September 1025
Regnal titles
Preceded by Robert II	King of France; Under Robert II; 19 June 1017 – 17 September 1025	Succeeded by Robert II; Henry I
