= Rodulfus Glaber =

11th-century French Benedictine historian

Rodulfus (or Radulfus or Raoul Glaber; 985–1047), was an 11th-century Benedictine chronicler.

== Life ==
Glaber was born in 985 in Burgundy. At the behest of his uncle, a monk at Saint-Léger-de-Champeaux (now Saint-Léger-Triey, Glaber was sent to a monastery at the age of twelve, but he was eventually expelled for disobedience. He spent much of his life moving from one monastery to another.

He then entered Moutiers-Saint-Jean Abbey near Dijon, and around the year 1010, joined the Abbey of St. Benignus, also near Dijon. There he met the reform-minded cleric from Piedmont, Abbot William of Volpiano. In 1028 he travelled to Italy with Volpiano, who encouraged to him write what would become his masterpiece, the Historiarum libri quinque ab anno incarnationis DCCCC usque ad annum MXLIV ("History in five books from 900 AD to 1044 AD"). The chronicle was dedicated to the Abbot of Cluny, Odilo. Today a few manuscripts of the Historiarum survive, including the author's original copy. As a second work, Rodulfus wrote a biography of Volpiano, which probably arose shortly after his death in 1031. That year, he moved to the Abbey of Saint-Germain en Auxerre. The monks at St-Germain got him to restore or compose the inscriptions on the numerous altars in their church, and on the tombs of the saints who were buried in it. When this was done his wanderings began again, and he went to Cluny, where he died in 1047.

== Works ==
Glaber is best known for Historiarum, which he is believed to have started writing during his time at the Abbey of Cluny around 1026 or so, and completed at Abbey of Saint-Germain en Auxerre some time later. Initially intended to be an ecclesiastical history, Glaber's focus is on events in the center of France, but occasionally ranges as far as Scotland and Southern Italy. His writings often sympathized with proponents of church reform of that age, including Henry II, Henry III and Robert II of France, while criticizing others like Conrad II, and Pope Benedict IX. As a source of events, the work is of limited value due to its chronological and geographic inadequacy, but it is of significant historical value, as it has helped shape our understanding of the 10th century and the moral and cultural condition of Europe at the turning of the first millennium.

Large extracts from his works are cited and discussed in The Year 1000, by French author Georges Duby. Historiarum was first published in 1596 from a manuscript owned by Pierre Pithou, as part of a collection of eleven medieval chronicles.

== Sources ==
- Raoul Glaber. "Paris, Bibliothèque nationale de France, fonds lat., ms. 5390, ff.222r-230r". Vita Domni VVillelmi Abbatis primi Fiscannensis [Life of Sir William the first Abbot of Fécamp] (11th century).
