= Odorannus =

Odorannus of Sens (c. 985-1046) was a Benedictine monk at the abbey of Saint-Pierre-le-Vif in Sens, France. He was, in varying capacities, an artist, architect, goldsmith, musical theorist, biographer, exegete and chronicler.

Virtually all that is known of Odorannus is the information he himself provides in his work. He was given an extensive education, apparently under the auspices of the abbot Rainard of Saint-Pierre-le-Vif (979-1015), who revitalized the monastery with learning. When Odorannus was about thirty years old, the Capetian King Robert the Pious of France (r. 996-1031) commissioned him to create a great reliquary to house the remains of Saint Savinianus, the first bishop of Sens. Odorannus' Chronicle describes in detail the interesting circumstances of this commission.

Under the year 1023 in his Chronicle, Odorannus refers to his being sent away from Saint-Pierre-le-Vif for a time, staying instead at the well-known abbey of Saint Denis. He returned after this time away. The reasons he gives for this banishment are unclear, but it seems there was some difficulty with his relationship with his fellow monks. Odorannus died at Saint-Pierre-le-Vif in 1046 after having finished the corpus of his works in 1045.

== Works ==
Odorannus' modern editors (see below) have categorized his works as follows:

=== Historical works ===
These include the Life of Theodochilda (Chapter 1), the alleged daughter of the Merovingian king Clovis, said to have founded Saint-Pierre-le-Vif, and the Chronicle (Chapter 2), spanning the years 675 to 1032.

=== Canonical consultations ===
These are the chapters of his compilation which deal with canon law, including a letter to the abbot William of Saint Denis (Chapter 3), a letter to the archbishop Gilduin (Chapter 10), a proclamation of archiepiscopal election for the city of Sens (Chapter 8), and a sermon to be read upon the ordination of Menard as archbishop of Sens (Chapter 9).

=== Theology and exegesis ===
These include a letter to the priest Evrardus (Chapter 4) regarding the sin of Solomon and other theological issues, in which Odorannus cites the poet Prudentius extensively, a letter to the monk Arembertus on the work of Amalarius of Metz and on the biblical figure of the Sunamite (Chapter 7), and a letter to the clerics Ayfredus and Hugh regarding accusations of heresy (Chapter 13).

=== Pastoral care and liturgy ===
These include an exhortation for fraternal concord, written by Odorannus on behalf of the abbot Ingo to monks previously under his care (Chapter 11), and a liturgical treatise, proposing prayers for the dead and visitation of the sick (Chapter 12).

=== Theory and practice of music ===
These include a tonary (Chapter 5), and a description of how to construct a monochord (Chapter 6). Both are in the form of letters to other monks.

== Editions ==
- Odorannus de Sens. Opera omnia. Textes édités, traduits et annotés par Robert-Henri Bautier, Monique Gilles, Marie-Elisabeth Duchez et Michel Huglo. Paris: Centre National de la Recherche Scientifique, 1972.

== Sources ==
- Bautier, Robert-Henri. "L'hérésie d'Orléans et le mouvement intellectuel au début du XIe siècle: documents et hypothèses." In idem. Recherches sur l'histoire de la France médiévale: Des Mérovingiens aux premiers Capétiens. VIII. 63-88. Hampshire: Variorum, 1991.
- Bautier, Robert-Henri and Monique Gilles. "Introduction." In Odorannus de Sens. Opera omnia. 7-69. (cited above)
- Bright, Catherine. "Ex quibus unus fuit Odorannus: Community and Self in an Eleventh-Century Monastery (Saint Pierre-Le-Vif, Sens)." Comitatus: A Journal of Medieval and Renaissance Studies 41 (2010): 77–118.
