= Abbey of Saint-Pierre-le-Vif =

Abbey in Sens, France

Coordinates: 48°11′52″N 3°17′46″E

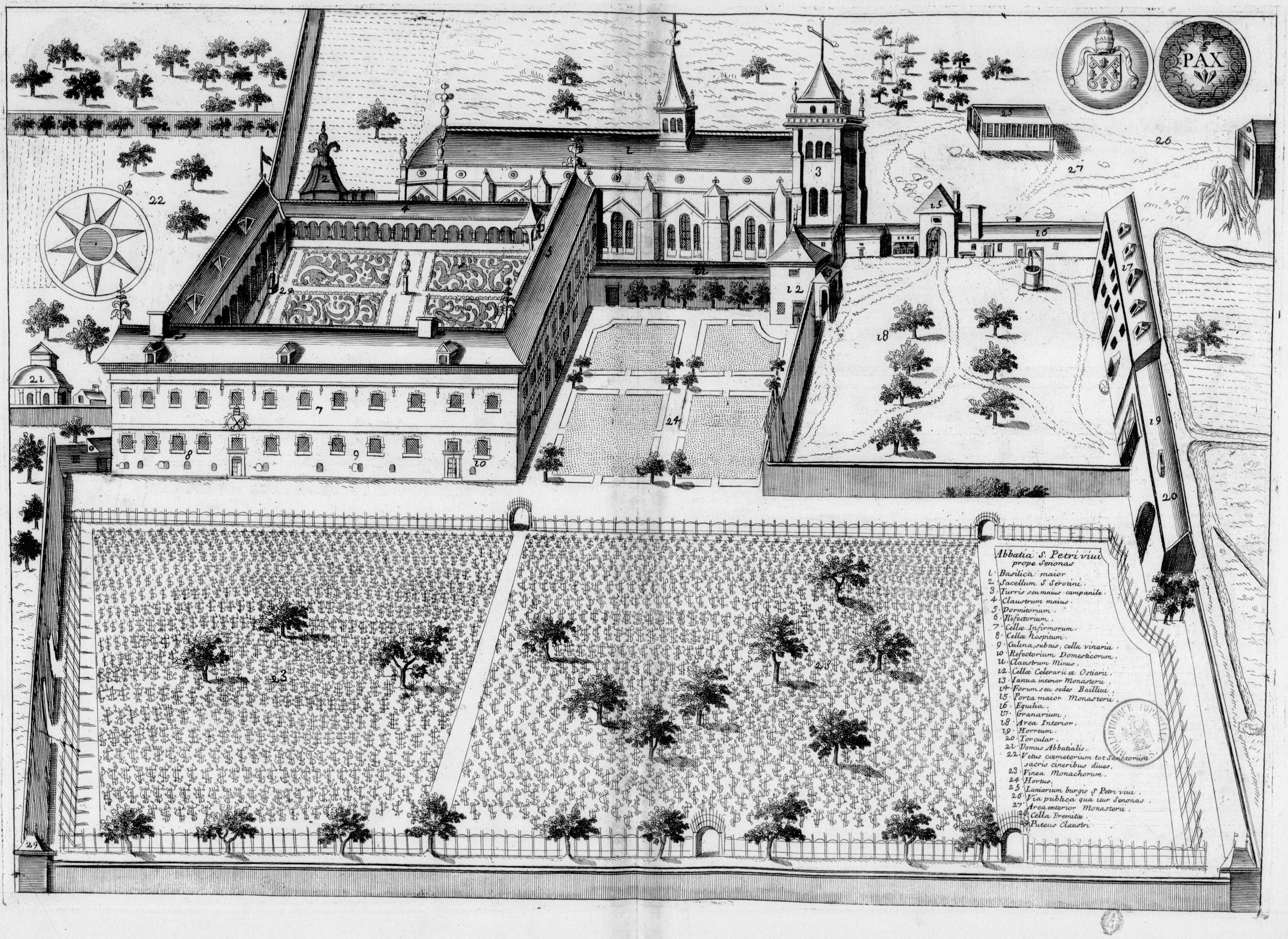
The Abbey of Saint-Pierre-le-Vif in the Monasticon Gallicanum

The Abbey of Saint-Pierre-le-Vif (French: Abbaye de Saint-Pierre-le-Vif) was a Benedictine monastery just outside the walls of Sens, France, in the Archdiocese of Sens.

== History ==
The first abbot of Saint-Pierre-le-Vif, Saint Ebbo, was bishop of Sens before 711. In 731 he led the people of Sens to compel the Saracens to lift their siege of the city.

Before the 9th century there was in the cemetery near the monastery a group of tombs, among which are those of the founders of the diocese and the first bishops, Savinian and Potentian. In 847, the transfer of their remains to the church of Saint-Pierre-le-Vif inspired popular devotion towards the two saints. In the middle of the 10th century their relics were hidden in a subterranean vault of the abbey to escape the pillage of the Hungarians, but in 1031 they were placed in a reliquary established by the writer Odorannus, a monk of the abbey. Odorannus attributed the founding of the monastery to a Merovingian princess named Theodechild. Later historians came to identify her as a daughter of Theuderic I.

The Chronicle of Saint-Pierre-le-Vif of Sens is a Latin chronicle written at the Abbey between about 1100 and 1125 with continuations added into the 13th century. The Chronicle is mainly a history of the abbey and of the city of Sens.

In 1238, Baldwin II, Latin Emperor of Constantinople, sold the Crown of thorns to Louis IX of France. The following year, during the royal progress of the relic to the Sainte-Chapelle in Paris, the court stopped at Sens. the king allowed the relic to repose overnight in the abbey.

During the Revolution, Étienne Charles de Loménie de Brienne, who had signed the Civil Constitution of the Clergy, bought the former abbey and had the majestic church, burial place of his predecessors as Archbishop of Sens, demolished, installing himself in the abbot's house with members of his family.
