= Countess of Eu =

This is a list of the countesses of Eu, a French fief in the Middle Ages.

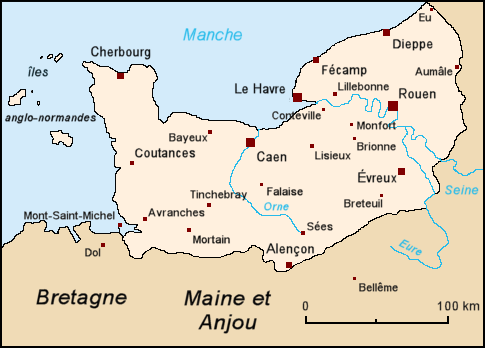
Map of Normandy

== Countess of Eu ==
=== House of Normandy, 996–1246 ===
Picture	Name	Father	Birth	Marriage	Became Countess	Ceased to be Countess	Death	Spouse
Geoffrey of Brionne's wife is not mentioned by name.
Gilbert of Brionne's wife is not mentioned by name.
	Lesceline of Harcourt	Turquetil of Harcourt, Lord of Tourville (Harcourt)	-	-	1040 husband's accession	1057 husband's death	26 January 1057/58	William I
	Adela, Countess of Soissons	Renaud, Count of Soissons	1042	1058		1077 husband's death	1079 or 1105	William Busac
Vacant (1077–1080)
	Beatrice	-	-	-	1080 husband's accession	on April 10, ?		Robert I
	Matilda of Sicily	Roger I of Sicily (Hauteville)	1062	before 1080		before 1080 repudiated	before 1094	Robert I
	Beatrice de Builly	-	1064	-	1091 husband's accession	-		William II
	Helisende d'Avranches	Richard Goz, Viscount of Avranches	-	-		January 1096 husband's death	-	William II
	Matilda	-	-	-	January 1096 husband's accession	30 Mar 1107 or before		Henry I
	Ermentrude	-	-	-		17/24 April ?		Henry I
	Margaret of Sully	William, Count of Sully (Blois)	1105	about 1122		12 July 1140 husband's death	15 December 1145	
	Alice (or Alix) d'Aubigny	William d'Aubigny, 1st Earl of Arundel	-	-	12 July 1140 husband's accession	26 Jun 1170 husband's death	11 September 1188	John I
	Matilda de Warenne	Hamelin de Warenne, Earl of Surrey	-	-	26 Jun 1170 husband's accession	12 or 16/17 July 1190/91 husband's death	before 13 December 1228	Henry II

=== House of Lusignan, 1219–1260 ===
Picture	Name	Father	Birth	Marriage	Became Countess	Ceased to be Countess	Death	Spouse
	Joan of Burgundy	Odo III, Duke of Burgundy (Burgundy)	1200	1222		1222–1223		Raoul II of Lusignan
	Yolande de Dreux	Robert II of Dreux (Dreux)	1196	after 1223		1 February 1239		Raoul II of Lusignan
	Philippa de Dammartin	Simon de Dammartin, Count of Amuale (Dammartin)	1225–1230	after 1239		1/2 Sep 1246 husband's death	14 April 1278/1281	Raoul II of Lusignan

=== House of Brienne, 1260–1350 ===
Picture	Name	Father	Birth	Marriage	Became Countess	Ceased to be Countess	Death	Spouse
	Beatrice of Châtillon	Guy III, Count of Saint-Pol (Châtillon)	-	-	1 October 1260 husband's accession	12 June 1294 husband's death	1304	John I of Brienne
	Joan, Countess of Guines	Baldwin, Count of Guines	-	-	5 July 1472 husband's accession	11 July 1302 husband's death	September 1331/19 April 1342	John II of Brienne
	Joan de Mello, Lady of Lormes and Château-Chinon	Dreux IV de Mello, Lord of Château-Chinon	-	1315		19 January 1344 husband's death	1351	Raoul I of Brienne
	Catherine of Savoy-Vaud	Louis II of Savoy, Baron de Vaud (Savoy)	-	before 19 December 1340	19 January 1344 husband's accession	19 November 1350 husband's death	18 January 1388	Raoul II of Brienne

Raoul IV was accused of treason in 1350, and the county was confiscated. The county was then given to John of Artois.

=== House of Artois, 1352–1472 ===
Picture	Name	Father	Birth	Marriage	Became Countess	Ceased to be Countess	Death	Spouse
	Isabeau of Melun, Lady of Houdain	Jean I, Viscount of Melun and Count of Tancarville (Melun)	1328	11 July 1352		6 April 1387, husband's death	20 December 1389	John of Artois
	Jeanne of Anjou, Duchess of Durazzo	Charles of Anjou, Duke of Durazzo (Anjou-Durazzo)	1344	1376	6 April 1387 husband's accession	20 July 1387 both's death		Robert IV of Artois
	Marie of Berry, Duchess of Auvergne	John of Valois, Duke of Berry (Valois)	1370	27 January 1393		16 June 1397 husband's death	June 1434	Philip of Artois
	Jeanne of Saveuse	Philippe, Lord of Saveuse	-	21 July 1448		2 January 1449		Charles of Artois
	Helene of Melun	John IV, Visount of Melun (Melun)	1370	23 September 1454		5 July 1472 husband's death	25 July 1472	

=== House of Burgundy-Nevers, 1472–1491 ===
Picture	Name	Father	Birth	Marriage	Became Countess	Ceased to be Countess	Death	Spouse
	Pauline de Brosse	Jean II de Brosse, Count of Penthièvre (Brosse)	1450	30 August 1471	5 July 1472 husband's accession	9 August 1479		John of Clamecy
	Françoise d'Albret	Arnaud Amanieu d'Albret, Lord of Orval (Albret)	1454	11 March 1480		25 September 1491 husband's death	20 March 1521	John of Clamecy

=== House of La Marck, 1491–1633 ===
Picture	Name	Father	Birth	Marriage	Became Countess	Ceased to be Countess	Death	Spouse
	Charlotte of Bourbon-Vendôme	Jean VIII de Bourbon, Count of Vendôme (Bourbon-La Marche)	1474	23 February 1489	25 September 1491 husband's accession	21 November 1506 husband's death	14 December 1520	Engelbert de Cleves
	Marie d'Albret, Countess of Rethel	Jean d'Albret, seigneur d'Orval (Albret)	25 March 1491	25 January 1504	21 November 1506 husband's accession	17 August 1521 husband's death	27 October 1549	Charles de Cleves
	Marguerite de Bourbon-Vendôme	Charles de Bourbon, Duke of Vendôme (Bourbon-La Marche)	26 October 1516	19 January 1538		13 February 1561 husband's death	1589 or 20 October 1559	François I de Cleves
	Anne de Bourbon-Montpensier	Louis III de Bourbon, Duke of Montpensier (Bourbon-Montpensier)	1540	1561		1562 husband's death	1572	François II de Cleves
	Diana de la Marck	Robert IV de La Marck, Duke of Bouillon (De la Marck)	16 June 1544	1558	1562 husband's accession	6 September 1564 husband's death	1612	Jacques de Cleves

=== House of Guise, 1633–1660 ===
Picture	Name	Father	Birth	Marriage	Became Countess	Ceased to be Countess	Death	Spouse
	Henriette Catherine, Duchess of Joyeuse	Henri de Joyeuse (Joyeuse)	8 January 1585	6 January 1611	11 May 1633 husband's accession	30 September 1640 husband's death	25 February 1656	Charles de Guise
	Anna Gonzaga	Charles I Gonzaga, Duke of Mantua (Gonzaga-Nevers)	1616	1639	30 September 1640 husband's accession	1641 divorce	6 July 1684	Henry II de Guise
	Honorée de Berghes, Countess of Bossut	-	-	11 November 1641		1643 divorce	August 1679	Henry II de Guise
	Marie-Françoise de Valois, Duchess of Angoulême	Louis Emmanuel de Valois, Duke of Angoulême (Valois-Angoulême)	27 March 1631	3 November 1649	1654 husband's accession	27 September 1654 husband's death	4 May 1696	Louis de Guise

=== House of Montpensier, 1660–1681 ===
None

=== House of Bourbon, 1681–1821 ===
Picture	Name	Father	Birth	Marriage	Became Countess	Ceased to be Countess	Death	Spouse
	Anne Louise Bénédicte de Bourbon	Henri Jules, Prince of Condé (Bourbon-Condé)	8 November 1676	19 May 1692		14 May 1736 husband's death	23 January 1753	Louis-Auguste de Bourbon
	Maria Teresa d'Este	Francesco III d'Este, Duke of Modena (Este)	6 October 1726	29 December 1744	13 July 1745 husband's accession	30 April 1754		Louis Jean Marie de Bourbon

=== House of Orléans, since 1793 ===
==== First Creation ====
Picture	Name	Father	Birth	Marriage	Became Countess	Ceased to be Countess	Death	Spouse
	Isabel, Princess Imperial of Brazil	Pedro II of Brazil (Braganza)	29 July 1846	15 October 1864		14 November 1921		Gaston d´Orléans

== See also ==
- Countess of Artois
- Duchess of Nevers
- Duchess of Guise
- Duchess of Orléans
- Duchess of Aumale

== Sources ==
- Edmund Chester Waters, 'The Counts of Eu, Sometime Lords of the Honour of Tickhill', The Yorkshire Archaeological and Topographical Journal, No. 9 (1886).
