= List of consorts of Nevers =

This is a list of consorts of Nevers.

== Countess of Nevers ==
=== House of Nevers, 990–1192 ===
Picture	Name	Father	Birth	Marriage	Became Countess	Ceased to be Countess	Death	Spouse
	Matilda of Macon	Otto-William, Count of Burgundy (Ivrea)	-	989	990 invested by father-in-law	13 November/13 December 1005		Landri
	Adela of France	Robert II of France (Capet)	1003	after 25 January 1016	11 May 1028 husband's accession	29 May 1040 husband's death	5 June, after 1063	Renauld I
	Ermengarde of Tonnerre	Renauld, Count of Tonnerre	1032	1045		1083		William I
	Ida of Forez	Artald V, Count of Forez	-	-		- divorce	-	Renauld II
	Agnes de Baugency	Lancelin II, Seigneur de Baugency	-	-		5 August 1089 husband's death	-	Renauld II
	Adelais	-	-	before 1096	20 June 1098 husband's accession	20 August 1148 husband's death	after 1144	William II
	Ida of Sponheim	Engelbert, Duke of Carinthia (Sponheim)	-	1142, or before	20 August 1148 husband's accession	21 November 1161 husband's death	25 May 1178	William III
	Eléonore of Vermandois	Ralph I, Count of Vermandois (Vermandois)	1148/9	1164		24 October 1168 husband's death	19/21 June 1213	William IV
	Matilda of Burgundy	Raymond of Burgundy, Count of Grignon (Burgundy)	1150	1168	24 October 1168 husband's accession	19 October 1175 husband's death	17 December 1219	Guy

=== Capetian House of Courtenay, 1192–1257 ===
- None

=== House of Dampierre, 1257–1262 ===
- None

=== House of Burgundy, 1262–1280 ===
- None

=== House of Dampierre, 1280–1384 ===
Picture	Name	Father	Birth	Marriage	Became Countess	Ceased to be Countess	Death	Spouse
	Joan, Countess of Rethel	Hugh IV, Count of Rethel	-	16 December 1290		24 July 1322 husband's death	1325	Louis I
	Margaret I, Countess of Burgundy	Philip V of France (Capet)	1309	22 July 1320	24 July 1322 husband's accession	26 August 1346 husband's death	9 May 1382	Louis II
	Margaret of Brabant	Henry II, Duke of Brabant (Leuven)	9 February 1323	6 June 1347		1368		Louis III

=== House of Valois-Burgundy, 1384–1491 ===
Picture	Name	Father	Birth	Marriage	Became Countess	Ceased to be Countess	Death	Spouse
	Margaret of Bavaria	Albert I, Duke of Bavaria (Wittelsbach)	1363	12 April 1385		21 March 1405 became Duchess of Burgundy	23 January 1423	John I
	Isabelle de Coucy	Enguerrand VII, Lord of Coucy (Coucy)	-	23 April 1409		1411		Philip II
	Bonne of Artois	Philip of Artois, Count of Eu (Artois)	1396	20 June 1413		25 October 1415 husband's death	17 September 1425	Philip II
	Marie d'Albret	Charles II d'Albret (Albret)	-	11 June 1456		25 May 1464 husband's death	after 4 January 1485	Charles I
	Jacqueline d'Ailly	Raoul d'Ailly, vidame d'Amiens (Ailly)	-	24 November 1435	25 May 1464 husband's death	1470		John II
	Pauline de Brosse	Jean II de Brosse, Count of Penthièvre (Brosse)	1450	30 August 1471		9 August 1479		John II
	Françoise d'Albret	Arnaud Amanieu d'Albret, Lord of Orval (Albret)	1454	11 March 1480		25 September 1491 husband's death	20 March 1521	John II

=== House of La Marck, 1491–1521 ===
Picture	Name	Father	Birth	Marriage	Became Countess	Ceased to be Countess	Death	Spouse
	Charlotte of Bourbon-Vendôme	Jean VIII de Bourbon, Count of Vendôme (Bourbon-La Marche)	1474	23 February 1489	25 September 1491 husband's accession	21 November 1506 husband's death	14 December 1520	Engelbert
	Marie d'Albret, Countess of Rethel	Jean d'Albret, seigneur d'Orval (Albret)	25 March 1491	25 January 1504	21 November 1506 husband's accession	17 August 1521 husband's death	27 October 1549	Charles II

== Duchess of Nevers ==
=== House of La Marck, 1521–1601 ===
Picture	Name	Father	Birth	Marriage	Became Duchess	Ceased to be Duchess	Death	Spouse
	Marguerite de Bourbon	Charles de Bourbon, Duke of Vendôme (Bourbon)	26 October 1516	19 January 1538		13 February 1561 husband's death	1589 or 20 October 1559	Francis I
	Anne de Bourbon	Louis III de Bourbon, Duke of Montpensier (Bourbon-Montpensier)	1540	1561		1562 husband's death	1572	Francis II
	Diane de La Marck	Robert IV de La Marck, Duke of Bouillon (De la Marck)	16 June 1544	1558	1562 husband's accession	6 September 1564 husband's death	1612	Jacques

=== Mancini family, 1659–1798 ===
Picture	Name	Father	Birth	Marriage	Became Duchess	Ceased to be Duchess	Death	Spouse
	Diane-Gabrielle de Damas de Thianges	Claude Leonor Damas de Thianges	-	15 December 1670		1715		Philippe Jules Mancini
Interregnum: 1707–1720
	Marianna Spinola	Giovanni Battista Spinola, Prince of Vergagne	1678	June 1709	1720 husband's accession	1730 husband's abdication	11 January 1738	Philippe Jules François Mancini
	Hélène Françoise Angélique Phélypeaux de Pontchartrain	Jérôme Phélypeaux de Pontchartrain	May 1715	17 December 1731		1781		Louis Jules Mancini Mazarini

== See also ==
- Counts and Dukes of Nevers
- List of consorts of Auxerre
- List of consorts of Tonnerre
- List of Burgundian consorts
- List of consorts of Rethels
- Countess of Flanders
- List of consorts of Étampes
- Countess of Eu
