= Elizabeth of Nevers =

Duchess of Cleves from 1455 to 1483

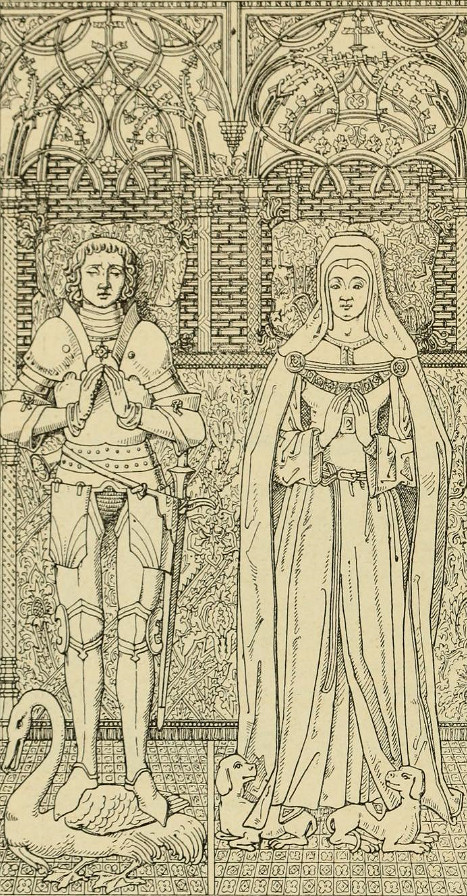
- Drawing of the grave of Elizabeth of Nevers and her husband John I of Cleves
- Born: after 24 August 1439; Nevers
- Died: 21 June 1483
- Buried: Collegiate Church of St. Mary, Cleves
- Noble family: Valois-Burgundy-Nevers
- Spouse: John I, Duke of Cleves
- Issue Detail: John II, Duke of Cleves; Engelbert, Count of Nevers; Philip of Cleves (Bishop)
- Father: John II, Count of Nevers
- Mother: Jacqueline d'Ailly

Elizabeth of Nevers (born: after 24 August 1439 in Nevers; died: 21 June 1483) was Duchess of Cleves from 1455 until her death, due to her marriage with John I of Cleves-Mark. She acted as regent of the Duchy of Cleves during the absence of her spouse in 1477. She was the matriarch of the house of Cleves-Nevers, and thus the Cleves line of the Counts and dukes of Nevers. Because the territory was part of her inheritance, it fell to her son Engelbert after her death.

== Life ==
Elizabeth was the oldest child of John II, Count of Étampes, Nevers, Rethel and Eu, and his first wife Jacqueline d'Ailly. Since Elizabeth's younger brother died at the age of five years and her father thus had no sons, he appointed his eldest daughter to the heir of the counties of Nevers and Eu.

On 22 April 1456, (Note: In some sources 1455 is given as the wedding year. This statement is likely to originate from the fact that the Marriage certificate of 27 March 1456 provides the incorrect date 27 March 1455.) she married in Bruges with her third cousin, Duke John I of Cleves. After the marriage of Mary of Burgundy with Adolph I of Cleves, this was the second marriage between the House of Burgundy and the House of La Marck. These marriages made the Duchy of Cleves into a kind of Burgundian annexe for the next 100 years, which was reflected mainly in the cultural life, the courtly life, but also the administrative practice in the territory of the Duke of Cleves increasingly followed the Burgundian example.

After the death of Adolf of Egmond, Duke of Guelders in 1477, both Adolf's sister, Catherine, and Emperor Maximilian I claimed the Duchy of Guelders. The Emperor's claim was based on his marriage with Mary of Burgundy. When her husband went to Guelders to support the Emperor's claim, Elizabeth led the government in Cleves during his absence.

Elizabeth died on 21 June 1483 before her father. Her claims to the counties of Nevers and Eu were inherited by her third son Engelbert, who founded the Cleves-Nevers line. She was buried in the Collegiate Church of St. Mary in Cleves, where she shares a grave with her husband. The grave is covered with engraved and gilded copper plates. The top plate, commissioned by Charles of Egmond, depicts the two deceased and is one of the few pictures of Elizabeth. The tomb is considered one of the most important artifacts of its kind.

== Marriage and issue ==
Elizabeth and John I had:

- John II (born: 13 April 1458; died: 15 March 1521), Duke of Cleves, married on 3 November 1489 with Matilda of Hesse
- Adolph (born:28 April 1461; died: 4 April 1498), a canon of Liege
- Engelbert (born: 26 September 1462; died: 21 November 1506), Count of Nevers and Eu, married on 23 February 1489 with Charlotte de Bourbon
- Dietrich (born: 29 June 1464; died young)
- Marie (born: 8 August 1465; died: 7 October 1513)
- Philip (born: 1 January 1467; died: 5 March 1505), Bishop of Nevers (1500–1505), Amiens (1501-1503), and Autun (1505)

== Ancestry ==
Ancestors of Elizabeth of Nevers

8. Philip the Bold
4. Philip II, Count of Nevers (1389–1415)
9. Margaret III, Countess of Flanders
2. John II, Count of Nevers (1415–1491)
10. Philip of Artois, Count of Eu
5. Bonne of Artois (1396–1425)
11. Marie, Duchess of Auvergne
1. Elizabeth of Nevers
12. Baudouin the Beaugeois d'Ailly
6. Raoul III d'Ailly
13. Joan of Raineval
3. Jacqueline d'Ailly (c. 1420–1470)
14. Robert VIII of Bethune
7. Jacqueline of Bethune
15. Isabelle of Ghistelles

== Sources ==
- Boltanski, Ariane (2006). Les ducs de Nevers et l'État royal: genèse d'un compromis (ca 1550 - ca 1600) (in French). Librairie Droz S.A.
- Hohmann, Karl-Heinz (1995). "Bau- und Kunstdenkmäler im Kreis Kleve. Eine kursorische Übersicht". Rheinische Kunststätten (in German). Vol. 419S. Neusser Druckerei und Verlag, Neuss.
- Quint, S. Gouda (1960). "Bijdragen en mededelingen". Gelre, Vereeniging tot Beoefening van Geldersche Geschiedenis, Oudheidkunde, en Recht (in Dutch). 59. D. Brouwer en Zoon.
- Schmidt, C. W. (1911). "Otto Forst: Die Ahnentafel des letzten Herzogs von Cleve, Jülich und Berg". Zeitschrift des Bergischen Geschichtsvereines (in German). 44. Neustadt an der Aisch.
