= Charles I of Nevers =

Count of Nevers and Rethel (1414–1464)

Charles I
- Count of Nevers and Rethel
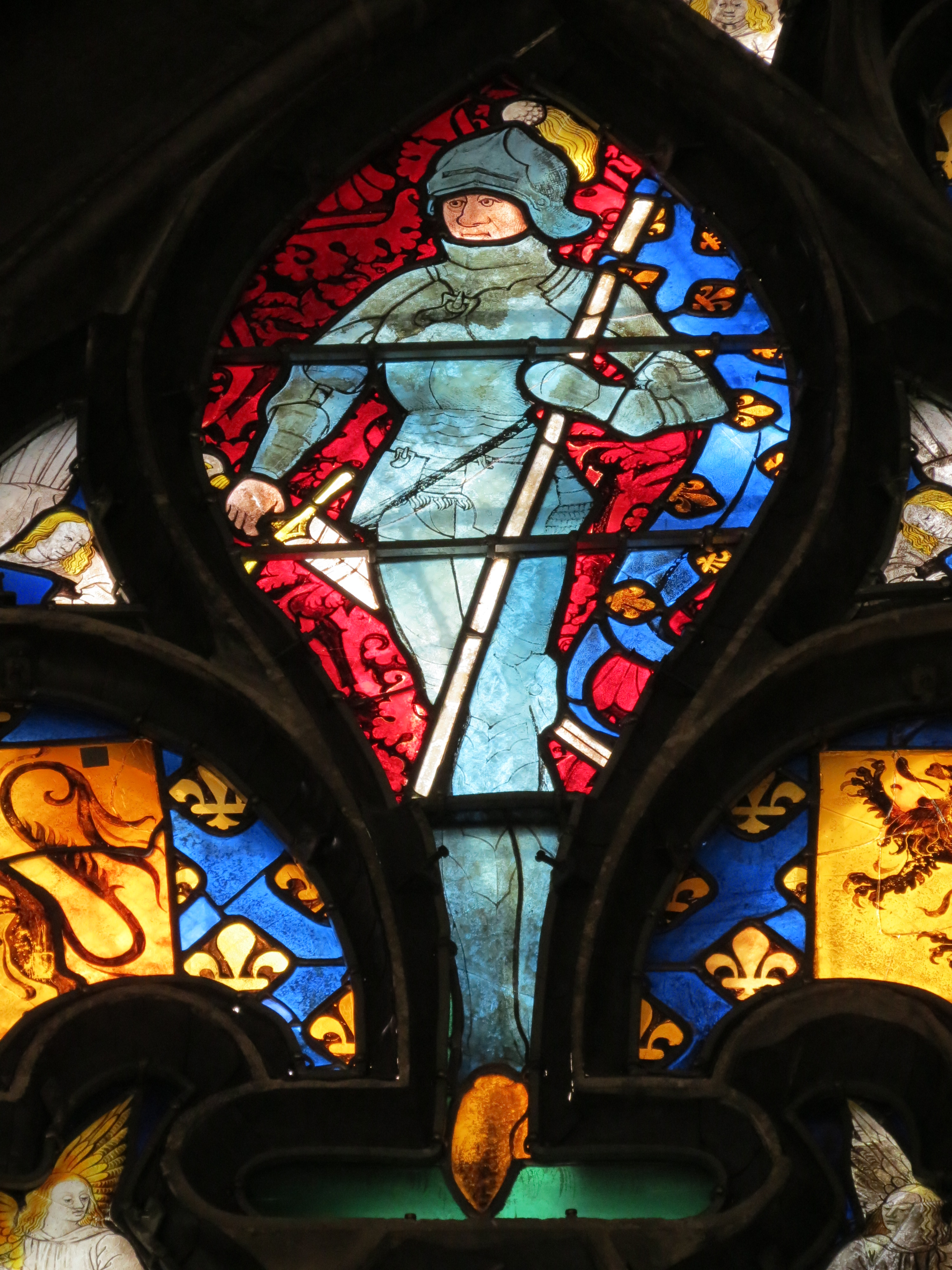
- Born: 1414
- Died: 25 May 1464 (aged 49–50)
- Noble family: Valois-Burgundy
- Spouse: Marie d'Albret
- Father: Philip II, Count of Nevers
- Mother: Bonne of Artois

Charles I (1414 – 25 May 1464) was Count of Nevers and Rethel.

== Biography ==
Charles was the son of Philip II, Count of Nevers and Bonne of Artois. His father was the youngest son of Philip the Bold, Duke of Burgundy.

Towards the end of the life of Philip III, Duke of Burgundy, Charles fell under suspicion of practising witchcraft in an effort to supplant Charles, Count of Charolais, as the heir to the Duchy. He fled to the French court and died soon after.

Charles married Marie d'Albret, daughter of Charles II d'Albret, on 11 June 1456, but had no legitimate children. He was succeeded by his brother John.

== Sources ==
- de Carvalho, Helena Avelar (2021). An Astrologer at Work in Late Medieval France: The Notebooks of S. Belle. Brill.
- Vaughan, Richard (2009). Philip the Bold. The Boydell Press.

Charles I of Nevers House of Valois-Burgundy Cadet branch of the House of Valois Born: 1414 Died: 25 May 1464
Preceded by Philip II	Count of Nevers and Rethel; 1415 – 1464	Succeeded by John II
