= Philip of Nevers =

Philip of Nevers may refer to:

- Philip I, Count of Nevers the Bold (1342-1402), also Duke of Burgundy
- Philip II, Count of Nevers (1389-1415)
