= Philip of Cleves =

Philip of Cleves may refer to:

- Philip of Cleves, Lord of Ravenstein (1459–1528), noble and army commander
- Philip of Cleves (bishop) (1467–1505), Bishop of Nevers, Amiens and Autun
