= Marie of Lusignan =

Marie/Maria/Mary of Lusignan or Marie of Cyprus may refer to:

- Marie of Lusignan, Countess of Brienne (1215-1251/3), daughter of Hugh I of Cyprus, wife of Walter IV of Brienne
- Marie of Lusignan, Countess d'Eu (1223-1260), daughter of Raoul II of Lusignan, wife of Alphonso of Brienne
- Marie of Lusignan, Queen of Aragon (1273-1319), daughter of Hugh III of Cyprus, wife of James II of Aragon
- Marie of Lusignan, Queen of Naples (1381-1404), daughter of James I of Cyprus, wife of Ladislaus of Naples
