= Duchy of Nivernais =

French duchy

Duchy of Nevers Duché de Nevers (French)
- 1521–1659
- Coat of arms

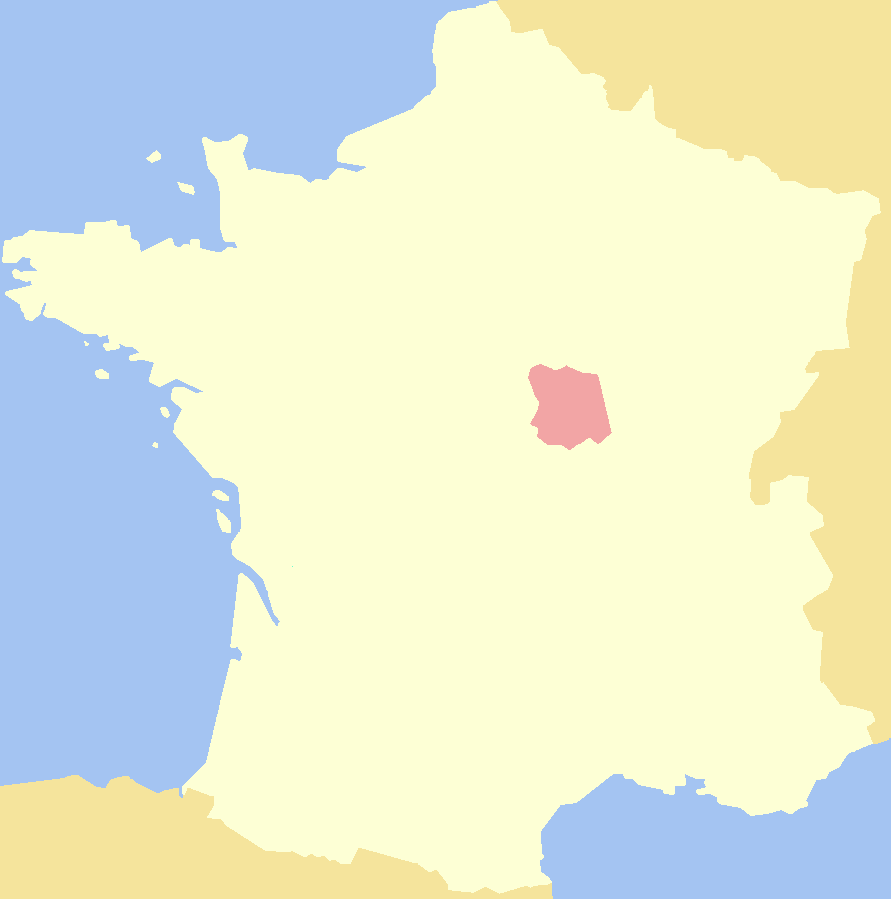
- Duchy of Nevers within the modern borders of France
- Capital: Nevers
- Demonym: Nivernais
- Government
  - Type: Duchy
- Duke of Burgundy
  - 1521–1555: Charles V, Holy Roman Emperor, Duke of Burgundy
  - 1665–1678: Charles III, Duke of Burgundy
- Duke of Nevers
  - 1521–1562: Francis I, Duke of Nevers
  - 1661–1678: Philippe Jules Mancini, Duke of Nevers
- Historical era: Early Modern
  - Count of Nevers raised to Duke: 1521
  - Became a province of the Kingdom of France: 1659
Preceded by	Succeeded by
County of Nevers	Province of Nevers

The Duchy of Nivernais (French: Duché de Nivernais) was a duchy in France, centred around the city of Nevers, of which the duchy took its name.

== History ==
In 1539, it was directly annexed to France and became a duchy in the peerage of France. For a time, it was held by a cadet branch of the House of Gonzaga. This branch inherited the Duchy of Mantua from the senior Gonzaga line (when it became extinct in 1627) and ruled Mantua until 1708, when the branch died out in the male line. Charles IV Gonzaga sold the duchies of Nevers and Rethel in 1659 to Cardinal Mazarin. His family held the duchy of Nevers until the French Revolution.

In 1659, when the Mazarin family took control of the duchy, the region was reduced to become a province of the Kingdom of France, thus becoming the Province of Nevers (French: Province de Nivernais). However, according to the laws of the peerage of France, the province kept the official title of 'Duchy of Nivernais', though it held the status of province of the Kingdom.

Following the Decree dividing France into departments in 1790, the province was broken up into three new departments: Nièvre (forming the main part), Yonne (northernmost parts), and Cher (south eastern most parts).

== Government ==
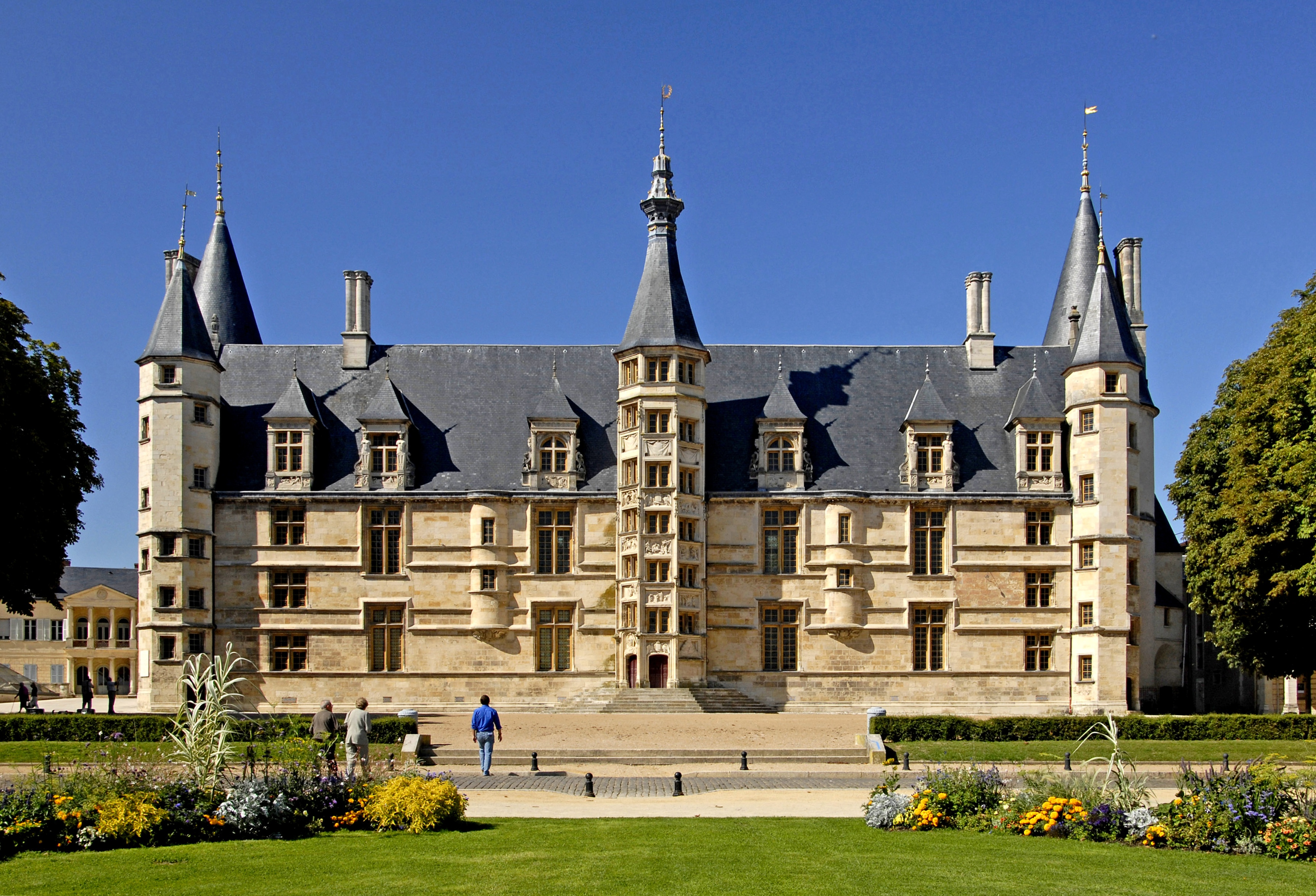
The Ducal Palace in Nevers

Following the governmental reforms of 1773, the Duchy of Nevers formed part of the Military Government of Nivers (Gouvernement de Nivernais). For the Department of Finances, the duchy was divided into four election counties: Nevers and Château-Chinon part of the Generality of Moulins, Clamecy was part of the Generality of Orléans, and La Charité-sur-Loire part of the Generality of Bourges. The Judicial Department, the county was part of the powerful Parlement of Paris.

Following the Decree dividing France into departments announced on 22 December 1789, the Duchy of Nevers was disestablished. The majority of the county formed the new Nièvre (forming the main part), Yonne (northernmost parts), and Cher (south eastern most parts).

== See also ==
- Counts and Dukes of Nevers
- County of Nevers
- Nivernais
