= Marie, Duchess of Auvergne =

Marie of Berry
- Duchess of Auvergne; Countess of Montpensier
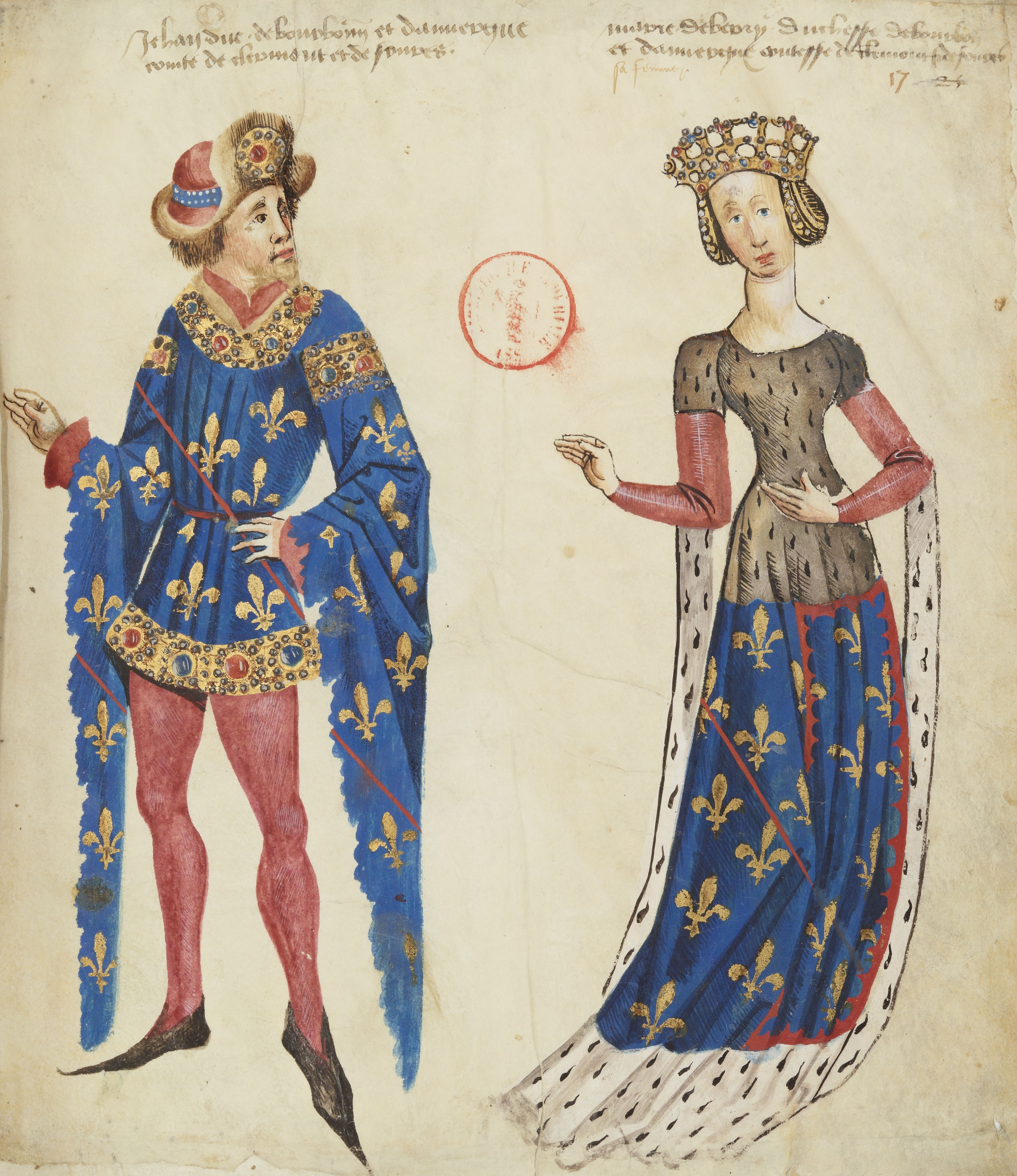
- Marie de Berry and her third husband John of Bourbon. Guillaume Revel, Armorial d'Auvergne: BNF Français 22297 f. 17r
- Born: c. 1375
- Died: June 1434; Lyon
- Burial: Priory of Souvigny
- Spouse: Louis III de Châtillon (m. 1386; died 1391) Philip of Artois, Count of Eu (m. 1393; died 1397) John I, Duke of Bourbon (m. 1401; died 1434)
- Issue more...: Charles of Artois, Count of Eu; Bonne, Duchess of Burgundy; Charles I, Duke of Bourbon; Louis I, Count of Montpensier
- House: Valois-Berry
- Father: John, Duke of Berry
- Mother: Joanna of Armagnac

Marie de Berry (c. 1375 – June 1434) was suo jure Duchess of Auvergne and Countess of Montpensier in 1416–1434. She was the daughter of John, Duke of Berry, and Joanna of Armagnac. She was married three times. She acted as administrator of the Duchy of Bourbon for her third spouse John I, Duke of Bourbon, during his imprisonment in England after he was captured following the French defeat at the Battle of Agincourt in 1415, until his death 1434.

== Life ==
Marie was born about the year 1375, the youngest daughter of John "the Magnificent", Duke of Berry and Joanna of Armagnac. Through her father, a great collector of antiquities, art patron and bibliophile, she was a granddaughter of King John II of France. She had three brothers, Charles, Louis, and John; and one older sister, Bonne.

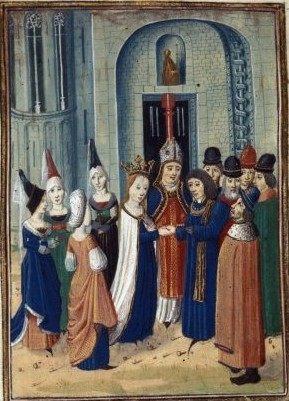
The wedding of Philip of Artois and Marie of Berry. Jean Froissart, Chroniques: BL Harleian MS 4380 f. 6r

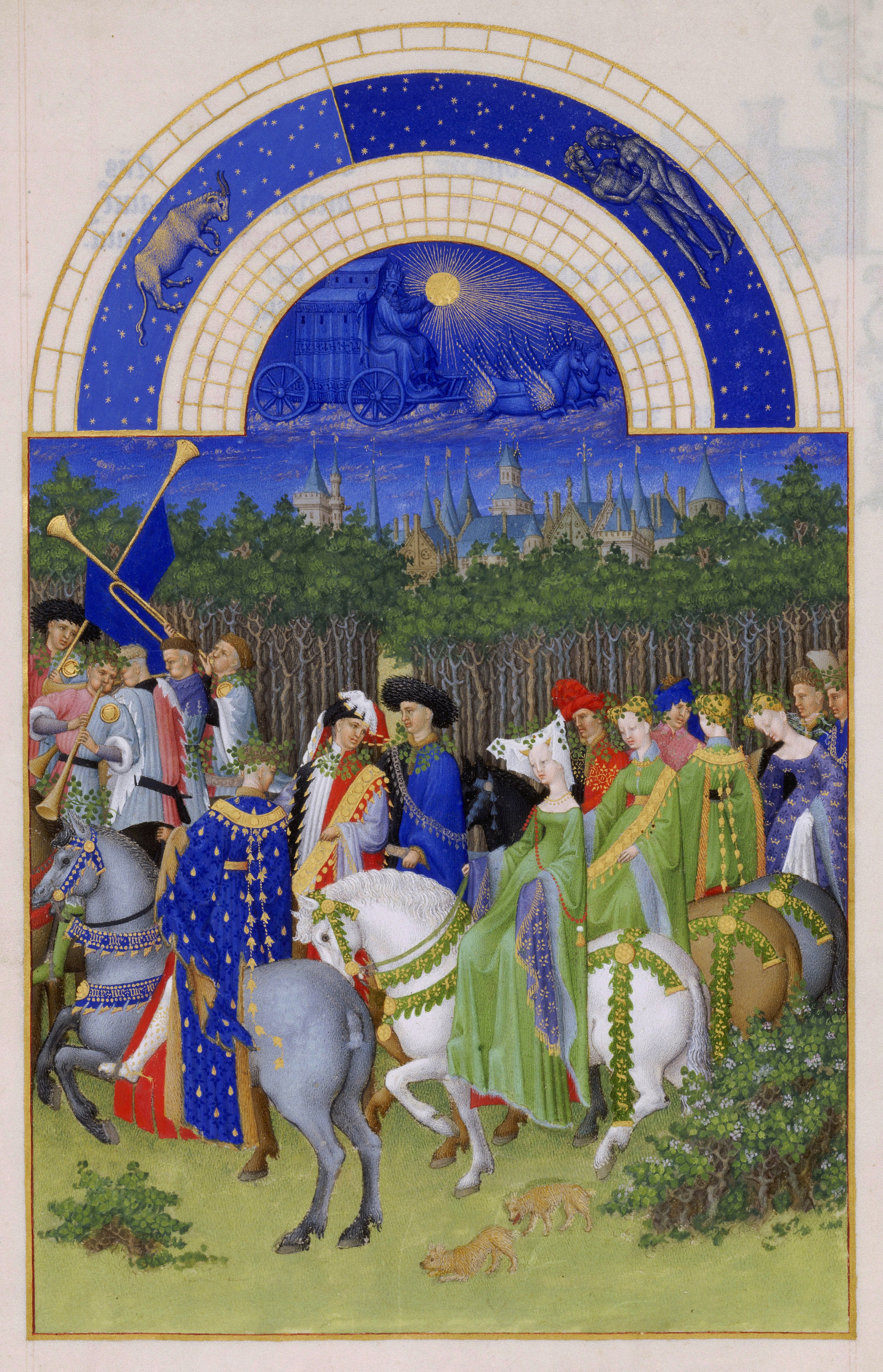
The month of May. Marie of Berry is seen centre foreground, riding a white horse, at her marriage to John of Bourbon. The Palais de la Cité where she was married may be the building in the centre background. Très Riches Heures du Duc de Berry: Musée Condé

=== Countess consort of Châtillon ===
The first of Marie's three marriages took place on 29 May 1386 in the Cathedral of Saint-Etienne at Bourges: aged about 11, Marie married Louis III de Châtillon as her first husband. Marie's father gave her a dowry of 70,000 francs; he gave Louis, his son-in-law, the county of Dunois. The marriage and trousseau had been arranged by the two fathers in 1384: "A Duke will dress her, in bed and out of it, and a Count will put the jewels on her", John, Duke of Berry and Guy II Count of Blois-Châtillon agreed. The festivities at the wedding de ces jeunes enfants ("of these young children") are described in Jean Froissart's Chronicles.

=== Countess of Eu ===
There were no children from this marriage, and Louis died on 15 July 1391. On 27 January 1393 a marriage contract was drawn up for Marie and Philip of Artois, Count of Eu. They were married the next month at the Palais du Louvre in Paris; King Charles VI of France himself paid for the festivities, while her father gave her a dowry of 70,000 francs. They had two sons and two daughters. The King appointed Philip Constable in 1392. Philippe went on Crusade and fought alongside his friend Jean II Le Maingre ("Boucicaut"), Marshal of France at the disastrous Battle of Nicopolis on 25 September 1396. Both were captured, and Philip died some months later in captivity at Micalizo, now called Mihalıççık, in western Turkey.

After Philippe's death inter Sarracenos ("among the Saracens"), his body was brought back to Eu, his home town, and Marie gave an endowment of £100 annually to the Collegial Church of Notre-Dame-et-Saint-Laurent for a mass to be celebrated there on 17 June each year in his memory. Their eldest son, Philippe, died on 23 December in the same year and is also buried in Eu. Jointly with her widowed sister-in-law, Jeanne of Thouars, Marie was appointed guardian of the three surviving children of her marriage with Philippe: Charles, Bonne and Catherine. Aged about three, Charles succeeded his father as Count of Eu. His revenues were held for him until he came of age by three trustees: Marie herself, her father, and her uncle Philip the Bold, Duke of Burgundy.

=== Duchess consort of Bourbon ===
Marie married her third husband John of Bourbon at the "King's Palace" (the Palais de la Cité) in Paris on 21 June 1401. The contract had been signed at Paris on 27 May 1400 after complex negotiations. They had three children. He was appointed Grand Chamberlain of France on 18 March 1408 and succeeded his father as Duke of Bourbon on 10 August 1410. Marie's father, fought in the 1356 Battle of Poitiers, had persuaded King Charles VI and the Dauphin not to fight at the battle of Agincourt on 25 October 1415, but Marie's husband did fight, was captured, and spent the rest of his life in English captivity.

Marie is believed to be depicted in one or possibly two full-page miniatures in the Très Riches Heures du Duc de Berry, a lavishly illustrated manuscript made for her father in the years after his sons' deaths. In the illustration for the month of April, the young noblemen and women in the foreground are grouped around a couple agreeing to be married. According to Patricia Stirnemann, referencing Saint-Jean Boudin, the scene, although not painted until about 1410, depicts the engagement of Marie with John of Bourbon in 1401. Raymond Cazelles disputes this, arguing that the couple are Marie's niece Bonne of Armagnac and Charles I, Duke of Orléans, who were to marry in 1411. A May Day celebration among nobles takes place in the foreground of the illustration for the month of May. Details appear to confirm that the house of Bourbon is represented. Both Cazelles and Stirnemann believe that the woman seen in the foreground, riding on a white horse and wearing a large white headdress, is Marie on the occasion of her marriage on 21 June 1401. These scholars do not agree as to which of the accompanying men is John of Bourbon. The buildings in the background have been variously identified, but G. Papertiant suggests that they are the Châtelet, Conciergerie and c in Paris, and at the centre the Palais de la Cité where Marie's wedding took place.

A manuscript made for Marie's own use and presented to her in 1406 survives today as BnF, fr. 926. It is a short collection of Christian devotional works, beginning with Bonaventure's Stimulus amoris, translated into French by Simon de Courcy as the Traitieé de l'esguillon d'amour divine. It includes a miniature of Marie and her daughter Bonne (aged about ten at this time) kneeling in prayer before the Virgin Mary. The manuscript is now in the Bibliothèque nationale de France. Marie also selected approximately 40 manuscripts from among her father's collection on his death, as she was still owed the 70,000 franc dowry from her second marriage.

=== Duchess of Auvergne and Countess of Montpensier ===
All three of Marie's brothers were dead before 1400, which explains the complexity of the negotiations for her third marriage: she and her elder sister Bonne were to be heirs to John, Duke of Berry's titles, which required royal assent. John of Berry died on 15 June 1416 (by which time Marie's husband was already a prisoner in England). Marie was accordingly appointed Duchess of Auvergne and Countess of Montpensier on 26 April 1418; these titles were confirmed in 1425. On 17 January 1421, her husband appointed her administrator of his estates as well. He died a prisoner in London in January 1434. Marie died in Lyon on an unknown date in June of the same year. She was buried at Souvigny Priory.

== Family ==
- Louis III de Châtillon (?-1391)
- Philip of Artois, Count of Eu (1358–1397)
  - Philippe (died 23 December 1397)
  - Charles of Artois, Count of Eu (c. 1394–1472)
  - Bonne (1396–1425), who married firstly Philip II, Count of Nevers (1389–1415), youngest son of Philip the Bold, Duke of Burgundy, in 1413; and secondly Philip the Good, Duke of Burgundy (1396–1467), in 1424 until her death.
  - Catherine (1397–1422?), who married John of Bourbon, Lord of Carency.
- John I, Duke of Bourbon (1381-1434)
  - Charles I, Duke of Bourbon (1401–1456), Duke of Bourbon from 1434 to 1456.
  - Louis (1403–1412, Paris), Count of Forez
  - Louis I, Count of Montpensier (1405–1486)
