= Engelbert, Count of Nevers =

Engelbert
- Count of Nevers
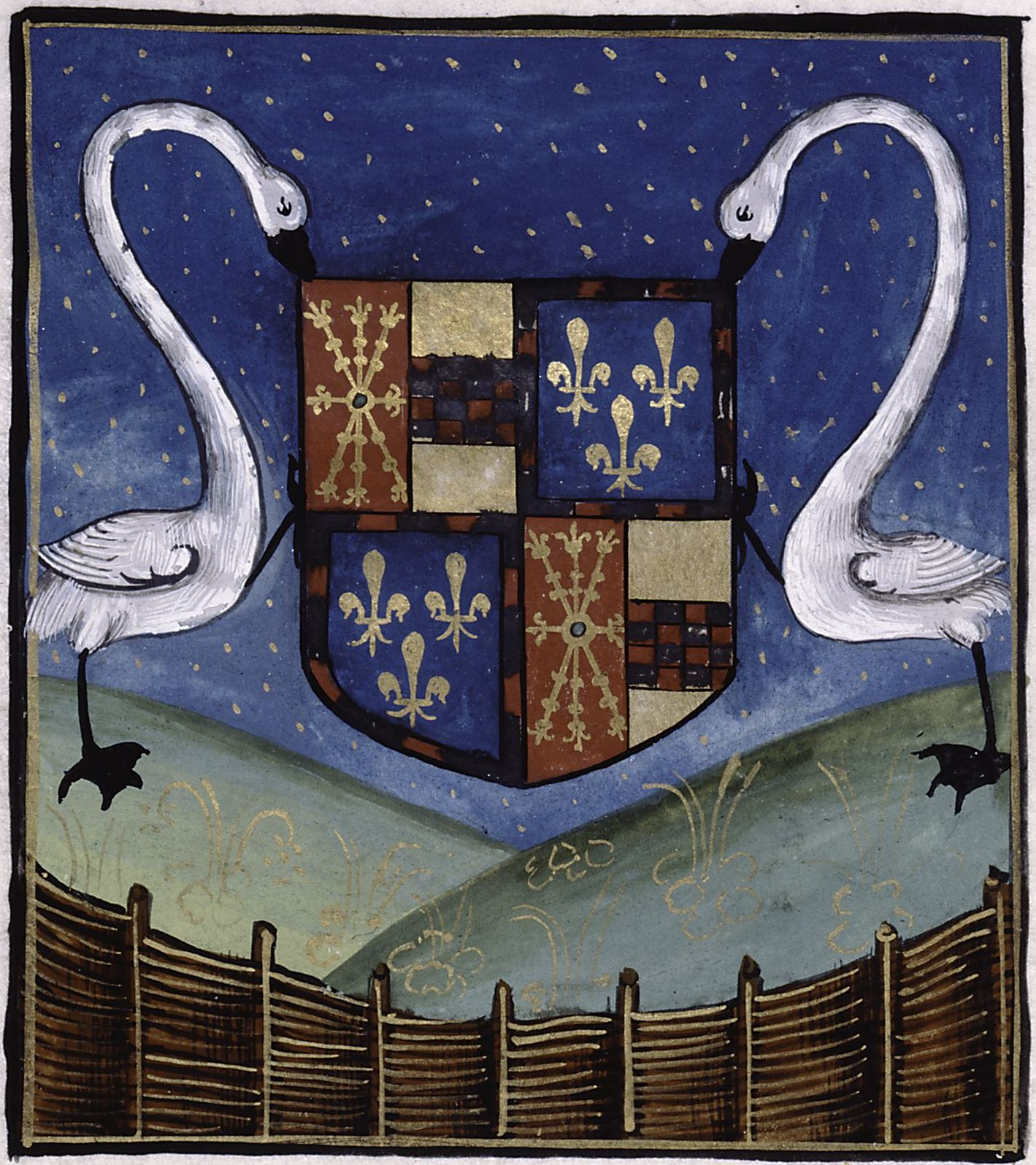
- Coat of arms of Engelbert of Cleves, Count of Nevers
- Born: 26 September 1462
- Died: 21 November 1506 (aged 44)
- Noble family: La Marck
- Spouse: Charlotte of Bourbon-Vendôme
- Issue: Charles II, Count of Nevers
- Father: John I, Duke of Cleves
- Mother: Elizabeth of Nevers

Engelbert of Cleves, Count of Nevers (26 September 1462 – 21 November 1506) was the younger son of John I, Duke of Cleves and Elizabeth of Nevers, only surviving child of John II, Count of Nevers.

In 1481, Engelbert was sent with a large army to the Bishopric of Utrecht by his brother John II, Duke of Cleves where they successfully ousted David of Burgundy. But after the Siege of Utrecht (1483) he had to flee, and Utrecht returned to the control of Burgundy.

Engelbert married Charlotte of Bourbon-Vendôme (1474-1520), daughter of John VIII, Count of Vendôme, circa 1489. They had three children :

- Charles II, Count of Nevers, married Marie of Albret, Countess of Rethel
- Louis of Cleves (1494-1545), Count of Auxerre (1543-1545), married (1542) to Catherine d'Amboise, daughter of Charles I d'Amboise, widow of Christophe de Tournon and Philibert de Beaujeu;
- François of Cleves († 1545), Abbot of Tréport, Prior of Saint-Éloi in Paris

Engelbert became Count of Nevers and Eu in 1491 upon the death of his maternal grandfather John II, Count of Nevers. His eldest brother John II (1458–1521) inherited Cleves.

== Ancestors ==
Ancestors of Engelbert, Count of Nevers

8. Adolf III of the Marck
4. Adolph I, Duke of Cleves
9. Margaret of Jülich
2. John I, Duke of Cleves
10. John the Fearless
5. Marie of Burgundy, Duchess of Cleves
11. Margaret of Bavaria
1. Engelbert, Count of Nevers
12. Philip II, Count of Nevers
6. John II, Count of Nevers
13. Bonne of Artois
3. Elizabeth of Nevers
14. Raoul d'Ailly
7. Jacqueline d'Ailly
15. Jaqueline of Béthune

== Sources ==
- Antonetti, Guy (2000). "Les Princes Etrangers". In Bardet, Jean-Pierre (ed.). Etat et société en France aux XVIIe et XVIIIe siècles (in French). Presses l'Universite de Paris-Sorbonne.
- Boltanski, Ariane (2006). Les ducs de Nevers et l'État royal: genèse d'un compromis (ca 1550 – ca 1600) (in French). Librairie Droz.
- Karl Leopold Strauven (1876). "Engelbert von Cleve" . Allgemeine Deutsche Biographie (in German). Vol. 4. Leipzig: Duncker & Humblot. p. 330.
- Jacques Dupont, Jacques Saillot: Cahiers de Saint Louis. Verlag Jacques Dupont, Angers 1976, S. 267.

Engelbert, Count of Nevers House of La Marck Born: 26 September 1462 Died: 21 November 1506
Preceded by John II	Count of Nevers; 1491–1506	Succeeded by Charles II
Preceded by John II	Count of Eu; 1491–1506	Succeeded by Charles II
