= Usson, Puy-de-Dôme =

Usson
- Commune
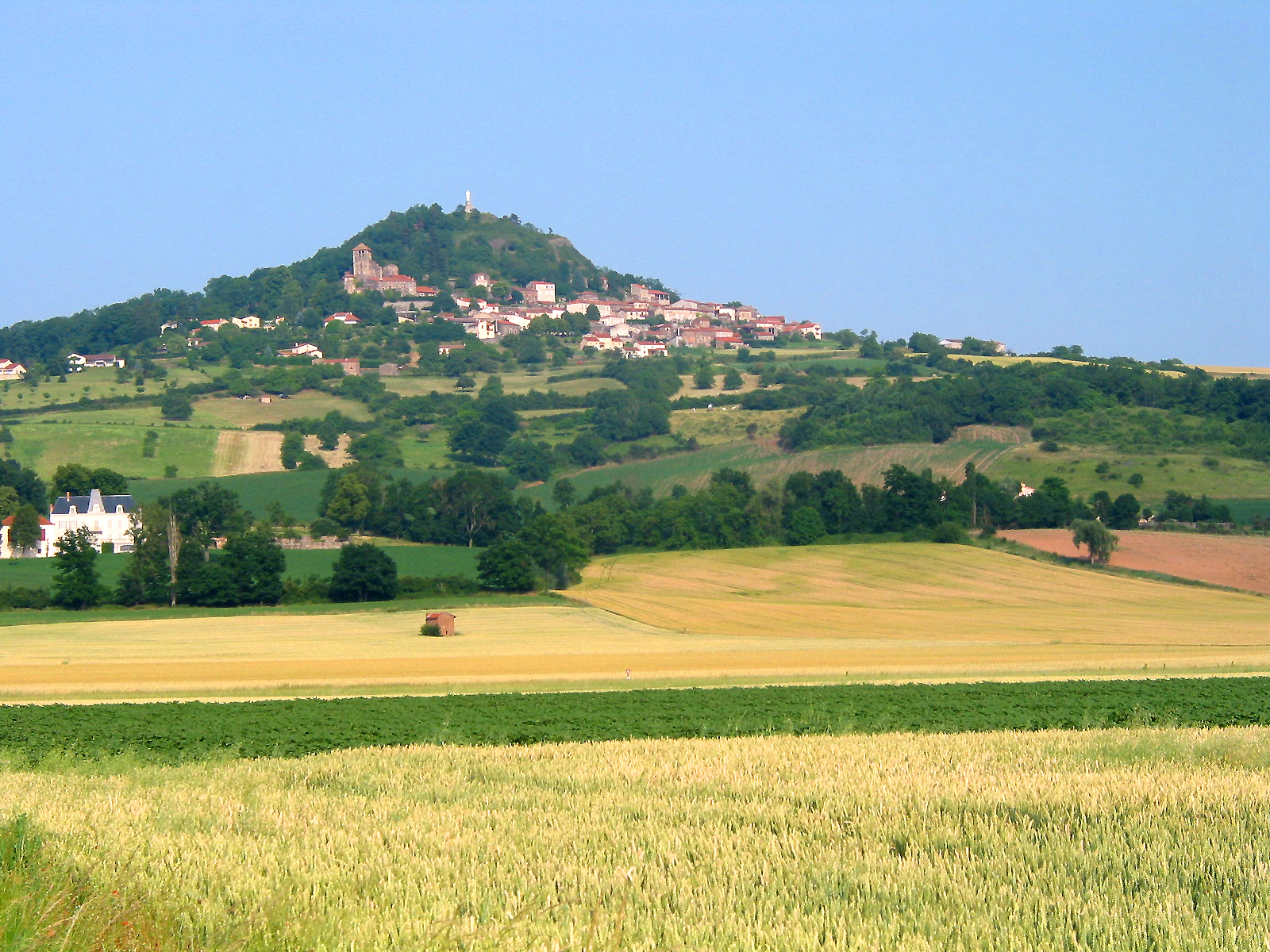
- The village on its volcanic mound

- Coat of arms
- Location of Usson
- Location within France Location within Auvergne-Rhône-Alpes
- Coordinates: 45°31′42″N 3°20′24″E
- Country: France
- Region: Auvergne-Rhône-Alpes
- Department: Puy-de-Dôme
- Arrondissement: Issoire
- Canton: Brassac-les-Mines
- Intercommunality: Agglo Pays d'Issoire

Government
  - Mayor (2026–32): Bertrand Livet
- Area^{1}: 5.43 km^{2} (2.10 sq mi)
- Highest elevation: 633 m (2,077 ft)
- Lowest elevation: 394 m (1,293 ft)
- Population (2023): 286
  - Density: 52.7/km^{2} (136/sq mi)
- Time zone: UTC+01:00 (CET)
  - Summer (DST): UTC+02:00 (CEST)
- INSEE/Postal code: 63439 /63490
- ^{1} French Land Register data, which excludes lakes, ponds, glaciers > 1 km^{2} (0.386 sq mi or 247 acres) and river estuaries.

Usson (French pronunciation: [ysɔ̃]) is a commune in the Puy-de-Dôme department in Auvergne in central France. It is a member of Les Plus Beaux Villages de France (The Most Beautiful Villages of France) Association.

== History ==
Usson's castle was the residence of Margaret of Valois from 1585 to 1605. It was demolished under the order of Cardinal Richelieu. According to a 15th-century drawing from the Armorial d'Auvergne, the fortress was large and heavily fortified, with three surrounding walls and 20 towers. The castle's motto was garde le traître et la dent (lit. beware the traitor and the tooth), suggesting that the secure fortifications could only be threatened by traitors or starvation.

== See also ==
- Communes of the Puy-de-Dôme department
