= John II of Nevers =

French noble (1415–1491)

- Count of Nevers, Rethel and Eu
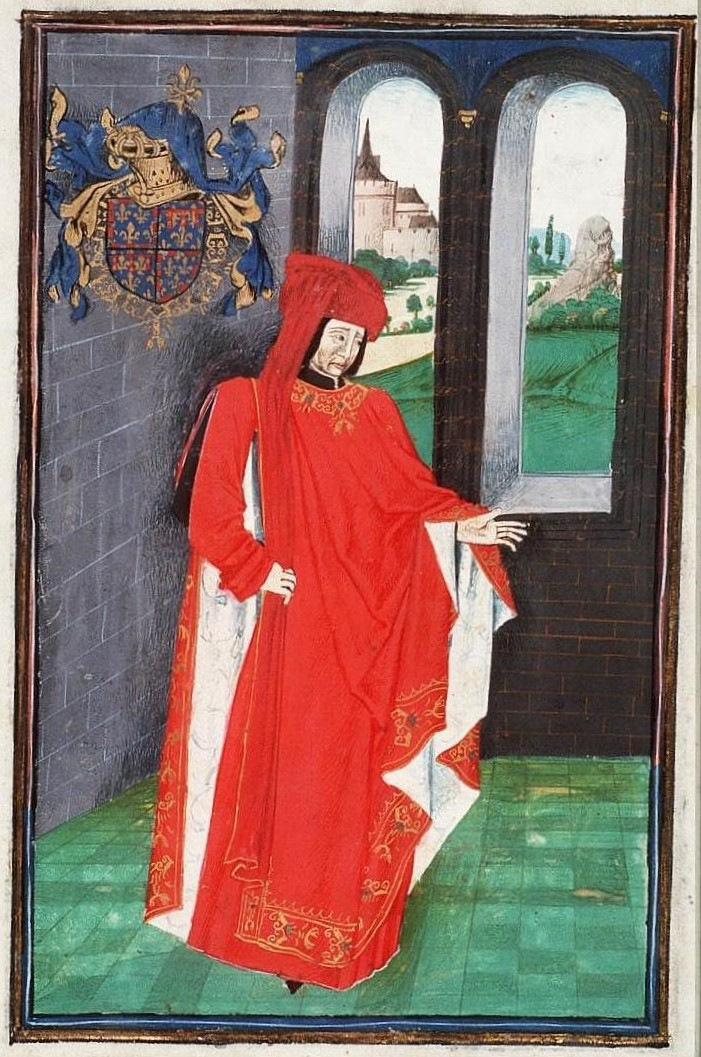
- John II, Count of Nevers
- Born: before 20 October 1415; Clamecy, Nievre
- Died: 25 September 1491 (aged 75); Nevers
- Noble family: Valois-Burgundy-Nevers
- Spouses: Jacqueline d'Ailly; Pauline de Brosse; Marie d'Albret
- Issue Detail: Elizabeth of Nevers
- Father: Philip II, Count of Nevers
- Mother: Bonne of Artois

John II, Count of Nevers (fr. Jean de Nevers , 1415–1491), known as John of Clamecy prior to acquiring titles, was a French nobleman and the last male member of the House of Valois-Burgundy. He was initially Count of Étampes from 1442 to 1465, and later became Count of Nevers and Rethel from 1464, and also Count of Eu from 1472. Since John had no male heirs, his counties of Nevers and Eu were inherited by his grandson Engelbert of Cleves, son of John's older daughter Elizabeth of Nevers (d. 1483), while the County of Rethel was inherited by John's younger daughter Charlotte (d. 1500).

== Life ==
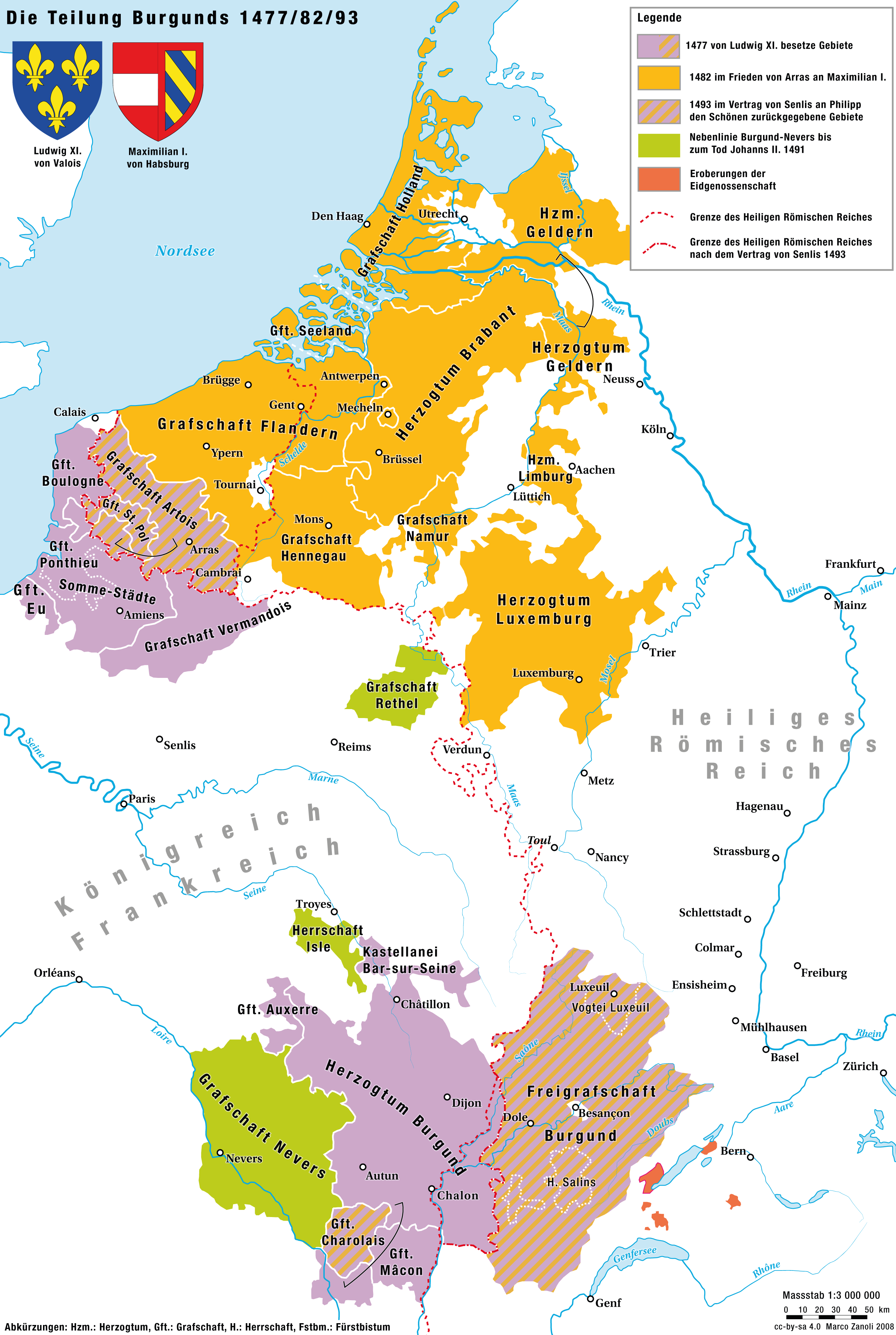
Domains of count John II of Nevers during the War of the Burgundian Succession (1477-1482-1493)

Coat-of-arms of John II, Count of Nevers

John was the son of Philip II, Count of Nevers and Bonne of Artois, daughter of Philip of Artois, Count of Eu. His father was the youngest son of Philip the Bold, Duke of Burgundy. As the younger son, John became Count of Étampes in 1442. John's elder brother, Charles I, Count of Nevers and Rethel, had no legitimate children, and so on his death in 1464 his titles passed to John. In 1472, his uncle Charles of Artois, Count of Eu, died, and having no legitimate children, his title also passed to John.

John fought in the army of his stepfather Philip the Good and was active in Picardy (1434), Calais (1436), Luxembourg (1443), and Flanders (1453). But he clashed with Philip's successor, Charles the Bold, and he defected to King Louis XI of France. He fought alongside Louis XI in the War of the Public Weal and became Lieutenant General of Normandy.

Being the closest male cousin of duke Charles of Burgundy, who died in 1477 without male heirs, John was excluded as a potential heir by the French king Louis XI, who seized the Duchy of Burgundy as a reverted royal fief, while the exclusion of John was based on the royal charter of 1364, that was restricting the Burgundian succession to direct male descendants, thus eliminating potential heirs from collateral branches.

== Family ==
John was first married on 24 November 1435 in Amiens, to Jacqueline d'Ailly, Dame d'Ingelmunster (died 1470), they had two children:

- Elizabeth (c. 1439 – 21 June 1483), who married John I, Duke of Cleves.
- Philip (1446–1452).

Upon Jacqueline's death in 1470 he married secondly on 30 August 1471, in Château de Boussac, to Pauline de Brosse (c. 1450-1479), daughter of Jean II de Brosse. They had one child:

- Charlotte (c. 1472 – 23 August 1500), Countess of Rethel (1491–1500), who married John d'Albret and had a daughter, Marie d'Albret, Countess of Rethel.

John's final marriage was on 11 March 1480, in the château de Châlus-Chabrol (Limousin), to Marie d'Albret (c. 1454-1521). (Note: According to de Mandrot, John married Françoise d'Albret)

== Ancestors ==
Ancestors of John II of Nevers

16. Philip VI of France
8. John II of France (= 28)
17. Joan the Lame
4. Philip the Bold
18. John I of Bohemia
9. Bonne of Bohemia (= 29)
19. Elisabeth of Bohemia (1292–1330)
2. Philip II, Count of Nevers
20. Louis I of Flanders
10. Louis II of Flanders
21. Margaret I, Countess of Burgundy
5. Margaret III, Countess of Flanders
22. John III, Duke of Brabant
11. Margaret of Brabant
23. Marie d'Évreux
1. John II, Count of Nevers
24. Robert III of Artois
12. John of Artois, Count of Eu
25. Joan of Valois
6. Philip of Artois, Count of Eu
26. John I of Melun
13. Isabeau of Melun
27. Isabeau d'Antoing
3. Bonne of Artois
28. John II of France (= 8)
14. John, Duke of Berry
29. Bonne of Bohemia (= 9)
7. Marie, Duchess of Auvergne
30. John I of Armagnac
15. Joan of Armagnac
31. Beatrice of Clermont

== Sources ==
- Boltanski, Ariane (2006). Les ducs de Nevers et l'État royal: genèse d'un compromis (ca 1550 - ca 1600) (in French). Librairie Droz S.A.
- de Mandrot, B. (1907). "Jean de Bourgogne, Duc de Brabant, Comte de Nevers, et le Proces de sa Succession (1415–1525)". Revue Historique (in French). T. 93, Fasc. 1.
- Nash, Susie (1999). Between France and Flanders: Manuscript Illumination in Amiens. University of Toronto Press.
- Potter, David L. (1995). A History of France, 1460–1560: The Emergence of a Nation. Basingstoke: Macmillan.
- Saenger, Paul (1977). "Burgundy and the Inalienability of Appanages in the Reign of Louis XI". French Historical Studies. 10 (1): 1–26.
- Vaughan, Richard (2010). Philip the Good. The Boydell Press.

John II of Nevers House of Valois-Burgundy-Nevers Cadet branch of the House of Valois Born: 1415 Died: 1491
Preceded by Richard de Dreux	Count of Etampes; 1442–1465	Succeeded by Francis II as Duke of Brittany
Preceded by Charles I	Count of Rethel; 1464–1491	Succeeded by Charlotte
Preceded by Charles I	Count of Nevers; 1464–1491	Succeeded by Engelbert
Preceded by Charles of Artois	Count of Eu; 1472–1491	Succeeded by Engelbert
