= Isabelle de Coucy =

Countess of Nevers from 1409 to 1411

Countess consort of Nevers
- Tenure: 9 April 1409 – 1411
- Born: 1386
- Died: 1411 (aged 24–25)
- Spouse: Philip II, Count of Nevers (m. 1409)
- Father: Enguerrand VII de Coucy
- Mother: Isabelle of Lorraine

Isabelle de Coucy (Note: (French pronunciation: [izabɛl də kusi])) (or Isabel; c. 1386 – c. 1411) was Countess of Nevers and Rethel from 1409 until her death as the first wife of Philip II, Count of Nevers.

== Biography ==
Her father's coat of arms.

Isabelle was born in 1386, she was the only daughter of Enguerrand VII de Coucy and his second wife, Isabelle of Lorraine.

=== Marriage and issue ===
On 9 April 1409, Isabelle married Philip II, Count of Nevers in Soissons, France. They had two children:

- Philip of Nevers (1410–1411/aft. 1415); died young
- Margaret of Nevers (1411–1411/1412); died young
