= County of Nevers =

County in France

Coordinates: 46.99°N 3.16°E

Map of France in 1477, Nevers is located between Berry and Bourgogne.

The County of Nevers (French: Comté de Nevers) was a county in central France. Its principal town was Nevers. It roughly corresponds to the later province of Nivernais and the modern of department of Nièvre.

The county itself dates from approximately the beginning of the 10th century. The county has frequently been associated with the neighboring Duchy of Burgundy; it was included among the lands and titles held by Duke Henry I of Burgundy. Beginning with Renauld I, the county was held jointly with that of the County of Auxerre. Nevers came under the rule of the count of Flanders in the 14th century, and from there, into the possessions of Duke Philip the Bold of Burgundy, briefly reuniting the two lands. Philip's younger son Philip II was granted the County of Nevers, passing later into the possession of a cadet branch of the dukes of Cleves. The count was raised to duke in 1539. In 1565 Louis Gonzaga became duke of Nivernais by marriage with Henriette of Cleves. His successor Charles II sold the duchy to Cardinal Mazarin. The duchy survived until the French Revolution, the last duke being Louis Jules Mancini Mazarini, who lost his title in the Revolution, but survived the Reign of Terror to die of natural causes in 1798.

== See also ==
- Counts and dukes of Nevers
- Duchy of Nivernais
- Nivernais
- Nevers
