= Alfonso of Brienne =

Crusader nobleman (c. 1220–1270)

Coat of arms of Alphonso

Alfonso of Brienne, called Alphonse d'Acre (c. 1220 – 14 September 1270), was the son of John of Brienne and Berengaria of León, born in Acre.

Alfonso took part in the Seventh Crusade (1248) as a squire. By his marriage (before 1250) to Marie, Countess of Eu he became Count of Eu. He was also Grand Chamberlain of France. He died on 14 September 1270 in Tunis on the Eighth Crusade in the same epidemic that claimed King Louis IX.

He had at least two children by Marie:

- John I of Brienne, Count of Eu
- Blanche (d. 1338), Abbess of Maubuisson

== Sources ==
- Perry, Guy (2018). The Briennes: The Rise and Fall of a Champenois Dynasty in the Age of the Crusades, c. 950-1356. Cambridge University Press.
- Pollock, M. A. (2015). Scotland, England and France After the Loss of Normandy, 1204-1296. The Boydell Press.

Preceded by Raoul II	Count of Eu with Marie; 1250–1270	Succeeded by John I
