= Agnes of Nevers =

Countess of Nevers, Auxerre and Tonnerre

Agnes (1170 – in 1192 or 1193 in Mailly) was the reigning countess of Nevers, Auxerre and Tonnerre between 1185 and 1192. She was the daughter of Guy, count of Nevers, Auxerre and Tonnerre, and Matilda of Burgundy, dame of Montpensier.

Heiress of the counties of Nevers, Auxerre and Tonnerre at the death of her brother William V in 1181, she was initially married to Olivier "Albus," lord of Grignon († 1181/84). When Olivier died, King Philip Augustus arranged her marriage in 1184 - she was 14 - with Peter II of Courtenay.

In 1185, she and her husband Peter confirmed by charter the privileges of the church of Saint-Étienne, and on 10 June 1190 they renounced by charter their hereditary rights in favor of Saint-Cyr. In 1191 they bought Tonnerre from Agnes's mother, Mathilde of Burgundy.

She died in 1192 or 1193, while her husband fought in the Holy Land with the Third Crusade, leaving a daughter and heir named Matilda.
