= Counts of Eu =

List of Leaders for the Now French County of Eu, 996 to present

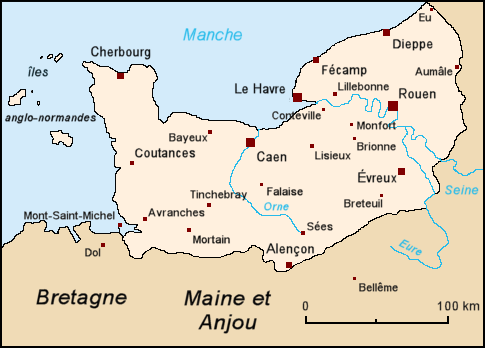
Map of Normandy

This is a list of the counts of Eu, a French county in the Middle Ages (Eu is in the department of Seine-Maritime, in the extreme north of Normandy), disputed between France and England during parts of the Hundred Years' War.

== House of Normandy ==
Arms of the Counts of Eu, House of Normandy

- 996–1015: Geoffrey, also Count of Brionne, illegitimate son of Duke Richard I of Normandy
- 1015–1040: Gilbert, also Count of Brionne, son of the previous
- 1040–1050 (approximate): William I, brother of Geoffrey
- William Busac, son of the previous, 1050-1053 (approximate)
- Robert I, also Lord of Hastings, son of William I, 1053–1093
- William II, also Lord of Hastings, son of Robert, 1093–1096
- Henry I, also Lord of Hastings, son of William II, 1096–1140
- John, also Lord of Hastings, son of Henry I, 1140–1170
- Henry II, also Lord of Hastings, son of John, 1170–1191
- Alix, Countess of Eu and Lady of Hastings, daughter of Henry II, 1191–1246.

== House of Lusignan ==
Arms of the Lusignan Counts of Eu

- 1213–1217/19 Raoul I of Lusignan, Seigneur of Exoudun, husband of Alix, Countess of Eu
- 1246–1250 Raoul II of Lusignan, Seigneur of Exoudun, son of Alix and Raoul I
- 1250–1260 Marie of Lusignan, daughter of Raoul II.

== House of Brienne ==
Arms of the Brienne Counts of Eu

- 1250–1260 Alphonso of Brienne, husband of Marie (1227), and son of John of Brienne and Berengaria of Castile; died 1270.
- 1260–1294 John I, son of Alphonso and Marie.
- 1294–1302 John II, Count of Guînes, son of John I.
- 1302–1344 Raoul III, Count of Guînes, Constable of France, son of John II.
- 1344–1350 Raoul IV, son of Raoul III.

Raoul IV was accused of treason in 1350, and the county was confiscated. The county was then given to John of Artois.

== House of Artois ==
Arms of the Artois Counts of Eu

- 1352–1387: John of Artois
- 1387: Robert of Artois, son of John
- 1387–1397: Philip of Artois, brother of Robert
- 1397–1399: Philip of Artois, son of Philip
- 1399–1472: Charles of Artois, brother of preceding

== House of Bourchier ==
Arms of the Bourchier Counts of Eu

- 1419–1420 William Bourchier, 1st Count of Eu (created by Henry V of England, rival of Charles of Artois)
- 1420–1483 Henry Bourchier, 2nd Count of Eu
- 1483–1540 Henry Bourchier, 3rd Count of Eu (no male issue, title extinct)

== House of Burgundy-Nevers ==
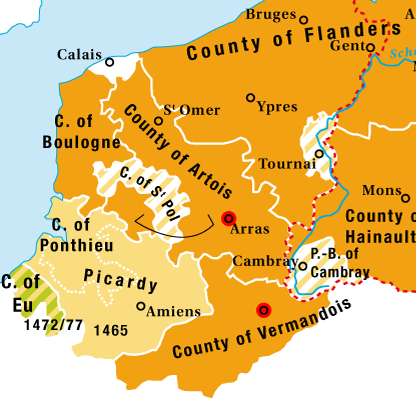
Burgundian Eu (lower left on map) 1472–1477

Arms of the Nevers Counts of Eu

- 1472–1491 John, Count of Nevers, Count of Rethel, nephew of Charles, son of Philip of Burgundy and Bonne of Artois, born 1415, died 1491. Maternal Grandfather of Duke of Cleves Johann II "The Pious" and Engelbert, Count of Nevers. {Johann II "The Pious" was father of John III, Duke of Cleves}.

== House of Cleves ==
Arms of the Cleves Counts of Eu

- 1492–1506 Engelbert of Cleves
- 1506–1521 Charles of Cleves
- 1521–1561 François I of Cleves
- 1561–1562 François II of Cleves
- 1562–1564 Jacques, Duke of Nevers
- 1564–1633 Catherine of Cleves with the following:
  - 1564–1567 with Antoine III de Croÿ, Prince of Porcien (first husband)
  - 1570–1588 with Henry I, Duke of Guise (second husband)
  - 1588–1633 with Charles, Duke of Guise (son)

== House of Guise ==
Arms of the Guise Counts of Eu

- 1633–1640 Charles, Duke of Guise
- 1640–1654 Henry II, Duke of Guise
- 1654 Louis, Duke of Joyeuse
- 1654–1660 Louis Joseph, Duke of Guise

In 1660, he sold Eu to the Duchess of Montpensier.

== House of Montpensier ==
- 1660–1681 Anne Marie Louise d'Orléans

She sold it in 1681 to the Duke of Maine.

== House of Bourbon ==
The title was used by the House of Bourbon du Maine till 1775 when that house became extinct. It then passed over to the cousins of the du Maines: The House of Bourbon-Penthièvre

- 1681–1736 Louis Auguste, Duke of Maine
- 1736–1755 Louis Auguste, Prince of Dombes;
  - son of the Duke of Maine
- 1755–1775 Louis Charles, Count of Eu;
  - brother of the Prince of Dombes
- 1775–1793 Louis Jean Marie de Bourbon, Duke of Penthièvre;
  - nephew of the Duke of Maine via the comte de Toulouse, du Maines younger brother
- 1793–1821 Louise Marie Adélaïde de Bourbon, Duchess of Orléans;
  - granddaughter of the Count of Toulouse
  - 1793 with Louis Philippe II, Duke of Orléans - husband of Louise Marie Adélaïde.

== House of Orléans ==
- 1842–1922 Gaston, Count of Eu
- 1974– Foulques, Duke of Aumale, Count of Eu
