= William V of Nevers =

William V (French: Guillaume V) was Count of Nevers and Auxerre from 1175 through 1181. His parents were Guy of Nevers and Mathilda of Grignon.

Following his father's death in 1175, his mother, Mathilda, was regent during his lifetime. He died as a child in 1181. William's sister, Agnes would become heiress of Nevers.
