= Henry I of Eu =

English Count

Henry I
- Count of Eu, Lord of Hastings
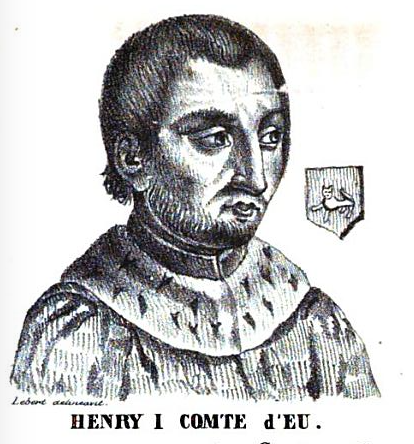
- Born: c. 1075
- Died: 12 July 1140
- Noble family: House of Normandy
- Spouses: Mathilde; Hermentrude; Margaret, daughter of William, Count of Sully
- Issue: John, Count of Eu and Lord of Hastings, Béatrice of Eu, Mathilde (Mahout) of Eu (d. 1153), Stephen (Etienne) of Eu (d. after 1140)
- Father: William II, Count of Eu
- Mother: Beatrice of Builly

Henry I, Count of Eu and Lord of Hastings (c. 1075 – 12 July 1140) was the son of William II, Count of Eu and his wife Beatrice of Builly. His father died in 1096, having revolted against King William II of England.

As the eldest son, Henry succeeded William as Count of Eu and Lord of Hastings. In 1101, he supported Duke Robert Curthose against his brother Henry Beauclerc who had just seized the English throne. Robert left Tréport, the domain of the county of Eu, to invade England. Orderic Vitalis reports that in 1104, while still in Normandy, Henry submitted to the English king. He fought for the king at the Battle of Tinchebray in 1106, where Duke Robert was taken prisoner, to remain in captivity for the rest of his life.

Henry joined the cause of William Clito, the son of Duke Robert, in the coalition composed of Baldwin VII of Flanders, Fulk V of Anjou, and Louis VI the Fat. In 1117, Henry and Hugh de Gournay were arrested at Rouen by Henry I. On the promise of good behaviour and at the request of William de Warenne, they were released. Nevertheless, Henry and Hugh, joining with Stephen of Aumale, led a rebellion in the northeast and provided military support to Baldwin VI. The rebellion ended in September 1118 at the Battle of Bures-en-Brai, where Baldwin was mortally wounded. Henry returned to the side of King Henry I.

A few months later, on 20 August 1119, Henry was one several barons who accompanied King Henry I when a meeting of the Norman and French royal armies gave rise to the Battle of Brémule. The French were swept away, and Louis VI had to flee and take refuge in the fortress of Les Andelys. In the following month, he took part in the defense of the town of Breteuil, which was attacked by the French king and his ally Amaury III of Montfort. Once again, the French were defeated. In 1124, William of Grandcourt, one of Henry's sons, took part in the ambush at Bourgtheroulde.. He captured Amaury III of Montfort, but chose to desert rather than hand him over to Henry I. In 1127, Henry again openly supported William Clito.

Henry first married Mathilde and secondly Ermentrude, both of unknown families. He married thirdly Margaret de Sully, daughter of William the Simple, Count of Sully. Henry and Margaret had:

- John, Count of Eu and Lord of Hastings
- Robert, lord of West Thurrock (died after 1149)
- Béatrice
- Mathilde (Mahout) of Eu (died 1153)
- Stephen (Etienne) of Eu (died after 1140).

William of Grandcourt (died 1150 or after) was also a son of Henry's but likely illegitimate. (Note: Leyser calls William of Grandcourt a son of the count of Eu.)

Henry founded the Cistercian abbey of Foucarmont in 1129, now known as La Fontaine Saint Martin. Henry embraced a religious life by becoming the Augustinian canon of the abbey Notre-Dame d'Eu. His death is marked on 12 July in the obituary of the abbey of Foucarmont, where he is buried.

Upon Henry's death, his son John became Count of Eu and Lord of Hastings.

== Sources ==
- Harper-Bill, Christopher; Harvey, Ruth E., eds. (1986). The Ideals and Practice of Medieval Knighthood. Vol. 1. Boydell.
- Hollister, C. Warren (2001). Henry I. Yale University Press.
- Leyser, Karl (1994). Communications and Power in Medieval Europe: The Gregorian Revolution and Beyond. Bloomsbury Publishing.
- Power, Daniel (2007). The Norman Frontier in the Twelfth and Early Thirteenth Centuries. Cambridge University Press.
