= Guy, Count of Nevers =

Guy
- Count of Nevers and Auxerre
- Predecessor: William IV, Count of Nevers
- Successor: William V, Count of Nevers
- Died: 19 October 1175
- Spouse: Matilda
- Issue: William V, Count of Nevers; Agnes I, Countess of Nevers; Ida
- Father: William III, Count of Nevers
- Mother: Ida of Sponheim

Guy (French: Guy or Gui, died 19 October 1175), was count of Nevers and Auxerre. He was the son of William III, Count of Nevers and Ida of Sponheim. He married Matilda, granddaughter of Duke Hugh II of Burgundy, just prior to his leaving for the holy land.

Guy succeeded his brother William IV in 1168. He died in 1175 and was succeeded by his son, William, whilst his wife Mathilde would be regent of Nevers.

== Children ==
Guy and Matilda had three children:

- William V, Count of Nevers
- Agnes I, Countess of Nevers
- Ida
