= John I of Brienne, Count of Eu =

Nobleman (1246-1294)

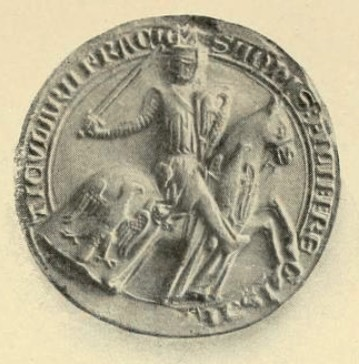
John I of Brienne, Count of Eu

John I of Brienne (born 1246 died 12 June 1294) was the son of Alphonso of Brienne and Marie de Lusignan. His mother was the heiress of Eu, Seine-Maritime, and he succeeded his father as Count of Eu in 1260. (both The Chronique des comtes d’Eu and the necrology of the church of Eu refer to Alphonso as either "Mister Alphons" or "Alphons, son of the king of Jerusalem," leading one to believe without the title of "count" it was passed to his son upon his wife's death in 1260.)

He married Beatrice, the daughter of Guy III, Count of Saint-Pol. They had:

1. John II of Brienne, Count of Eu
2. Isabelle (d. 1302 or 1307), married John II of Dampierre, Viscount of Troyes (d. c.1307)
3. Jeanne (d. aft. 12 March 1325), married first Raymond VI, Viscount of Turenne (d. 1304), married second before 4 August 1314 Renauld, Lord of Picquigny, vidame of Amiens (d. 1315)
4. Marguerite (d. 1310), married Guy, Viscount of Thouars (d. 1308). Guy was the son of Aimery IX and Margaret of Lusignan, who was the daughter of Hugh X of Lusignan and Isabella of Angoulême.
5. Mahaut (d. aft. 1328), married Alfonso de la Cerda

John died at Clermont-en-Beauvaisis in 1294.

== Sources ==
- Perry, Guy (2018). The Briennes: The Rise and Fall of a Champenois Dynasty in the Age of the Crusades, c. 950-1356. Cambridge University Press.
- Pollock, M.A. (2015). Scotland, England and France after the Loss of Normandy. The Boydell Press.

French nobility
| Preceded by Alphonso of Brienne with Marie | Count of Eu; 1270–1294 | Succeeded by John II |
