= William III of Nevers =

French nobleman

Count of Nevers
- Reign: 1148 – 1161
- Predecessor: William II
- Successor: William IV
- Born: c. 1107
- Died: 21 November 1161
- Spouse: Ida of Sponheim
- Issue: William IV, Count of Nevers; Guy, Count of Nevers; Renaud; Adelaide; Ermengarde
- Father: William II, Count of Nevers
- Mother: Adelaide

William III, Count of Nevers (French: Guillaume III, c. 1107 – 21 November 1161) was Count of Nevers, Auxerre and Tonnerre (1148–1161). He was born in Auxerre.

== Family ==
William was a son of William II of Nevers and his wife Adelaide. His brother Renaud of Nevers was Count of Tonnerre until his death in 1148, while participating in the Second Crusade. Robert of Nevers, another brother, is only mentioned in a charter dating to 1134. Their sister Anne of Nevers was married with William VIII, Count of Auvergne, also known as "William the Old" (reign 1155–1182). They were parents to Robert IV, Count of Auvergne (reign 1182–1194).

== Life account ==
William is recorded as co-signing legal decisions by his father in charter dating to 1121 and 1134. On 21 September 1137, Orderic Vitalis records him accompanying Geoffrey V of Anjou in his entry in the Duchy of Normandy, as part of the conflict between Matilda, Countess of Anjou and her cousin Stephen of England. Their struggle lasted from 1135 to 1154 and is known as The Anarchy.

William joined Louis VII of France in the Second Crusade. On 21 August 1148, his father died and William III succeeded him in Nevers and Auxerre. He is considered to have succeeded his younger brother in Tonnere at about the same time.

== Marriage ==
William married Ida of Sponheim. She was the daughter of Engelbert, Duke of Carinthia and Uta of Passau. They had:

- William IV, Count of Nevers (died 24 October 1168).
- Guy, Count of Nevers (died 19 October 1175).
- Renaud of Nevers, Lord of Decize, died on Third Crusade at the Siege of Acre (1189–91).
- Adelaide of Nevers married Renaud IV, Count of Joigny.
- Ermengarde of Nevers.

== Sources ==
- Bouchard, Constance Brittain (1987). Sword, Miter, and Cloister: Nobility and the Church in Burgundy, 980-1198. Cornell University Press. ISBN 0-8014-1974-3.
- Orderic Vitalis (1978). Chibnall, Marjorie (ed.). Historia Ecclesiastica. Vol. VI: Book XIII.
- Runciman, Steven (1952). A History of the Crusades. Vol. 2: The Kingdom of Jerusalem and the Frankish East.

French nobility
Preceded by William II	Count of Nevers, Count of Auxerre; 1148–1161	Succeeded by William IV
