= Marie, Countess of Eu =

Marie of Lusignan
- Reign: 1246–1260
- Born: 1223 Eu, Seine-Maritime France
- Died: 1 October 1260 (age 37); Poitou
- Spouse: Alphonso of Brienne
- Issue: John I
- House: House of Lusignan
- Father: Raoul II of Lusignan
- Mother: Yolande de Dreux

Marie of Lusignan or Marie I de Lusignan (born 1223 in Eu, Seine-Maritime, France, died in Poitou, 1 October 1260; buried at the Abbey of Foucarmont), was the only child of Raoul II of Lusignan and his second wife, Yolande de Dreux. She became Dame d'Exoudun, Countess of Eu on the death of her father in 1246.

She was married around 1245 to Alphonso of Brienne who became Count of Eu by this marriage.

Marie and Alphonso had at least two children:

- John I of Brienne, Count of Eu
- Blanche, Abbess of Maubuisson (died 1338)

== Sources ==
- Pollock, M.A. (2015). Scotland, England and France after the Loss of Normandy. The Boydell Press.
