= Nivernais =

Coordinates: 46.99°N 3.16°E

- Flag Coat of arms

- Country: France
- Time zone: CET

Nivernais (/ˌniːvərˈneɪ/, French: [nivɛʁnɛ]) was a province of France, around the city of Nevers, which forms the modern department of Nièvre. It roughly coincides with the former Duchy of Nevers.

The raw climate and soils cause the area to be heavily wooded.

== Culture ==
À la nivernaise refers to a cooking style involving a glaze, usually of butter and sugar, although sometimes involving butter and some other ingredient.
