= William II of Eu =

Anglo-Norman noble

William II, Count of Eu, feudal baron of Hastings (died about 1096) was a first generation Anglo-Norman nobleman, Count of Eu.

== Origins ==
According to most authorities he was the son and heir of Robert, Count of Eu, (Note: Professor David Douglas disputed this identification, basing himself on the genealogical researches of Edmund Chester Waters. In support of Douglas, while the west country estates of William were confiscated by the Crown in 1095, the strategically important Honour of Hastings was left in the hands of the Counts of Eu. It seems likely therefore that different people are referred to) (died before 1093), by his wife Beatrix de Falaise.

== Career ==
William of Eu held about seventy-seven manors in the west of England and was one of the rebels against King William II of England in 1088. Although he made his peace with that King, together with William of Aldrie (his wife's nephew), Roger de Lacy and Robert de Mowbray, he conspired to murder William II and to replace him on the throne with Stephen of Aumale, the King's cousin.

In 1095 the rebels impounded four Norwegian trading ships and refused the King's demand to return the merchandise. King William conducted a lightning campaign, outflanking the rebels at Newcastle upon Tyne and capturing a rebel stronghold at Morpeth in Northumberland. He besieged the rebels at Bamburgh Castle and built a castle facing the surviving one. During January 1096 in Salisbury, William was formally accused of treason, challenged to trial by combat, and defeated by Geoffrey Baynard, former High Sheriff of Yorkshire, acting as the King's champion. William was sentenced to be blinded and castrated, a mutilation from which he never recovered. William died sometime later and was buried at Hastings. William's son Henry inherited the countship of Eu and also became Lord of Hastings.

== Marriage and children ==
William married twice:

- Firstly to Beatrice de Builly, daughter of Roger I de Builly (d. circa 1098/1100), feudal baron of Tickhill in Yorkshire and sister and heiress of Roger II de Builli. By this first wife he had one son:
  - Henry I, Count of Eu, feudal baron of Hastings (d. 1140).
- Secondly to Helisende d'Avranches, daughter of Richard le Goz, Viscount of Avranches, and sister of Hugh d'Avranches, Earl of Chester (d. 1101). (Note: Sanders does not give her first name or father's name)

== Sources ==
- Barlow, Frank (2000). William Rufus. Yale University Press. ISBN 9780300082913.
- Cownie, Emma (1998). Religious Patronage in Anglo-Norman England, 1066-1135. Royal Historical Society.
- Power, Daniel (2007). The Norman Frontier in the Twelfth and Early Thirteenth Centuries. Cambridge University Press.
- Sanders, I.J. (1960). English Baronies: A Study of their Origin and Descent 1086-1327. Oxford at the Clarendon Press.
