= John II of Brienne, Count of Eu =

Nobleman (died 1302)

John II of Brienne (died 11 July 1302 in Kortrijk) was the son of John I of Brienne, Count of Eu and Beatrice of Saint-Pol. He succeeded his father as Count of Eu in 1294.

He married Jeanne, Countess of Guînes (d. 1331 or 1332), the daughter and heir of Baldwin IV, Count of Guînes. They had two children:

1. Raoul I of Brienne, Count of Eu
2. Marie, d. young

John was killed at the Battle of the Golden Spurs.

== Sources ==
- Perry, Guy (2018). The Briennes: The Rise and Fall of a Champenois Dynasty in the Age of the Crusades, c. 950-1356. Cambridge University Press.
- Verbruggen, J. F. (2002). Devries, Kelly (ed.). The Battle of the Golden Spurs (Courtrai, 11 July 1302). Translated by Ferguson, David Richard. The Boydell Press.

Preceded by John I	Count of Eu; 1294–1302	Succeeded by Raoul III
