= William II of Nevers =

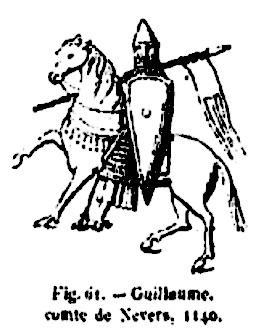
William II

The routes through western Anatolia taken by the crusaders of 1101. William followed the southern route, past Konya, leading to the Battle of Heraclea Cybistra.

William II, Count of Nevers (French: Guillaume II, born prior to 1089, reigned 1098 – 21 August 1148), was a crusader in the Crusade of 1101.

== Family ==
He was a son of Renauld II, Count of Nevers and his second wife Agnes of Beaugency.

He had an older half-sister, Ermengarde of Nevers, who married into the House of Courtenay. She was a daughter of Renauld II and his first wife Ida of Lyon and Forez. He had at least two younger brothers. The better known of them was Robert of Nevers, Viscount of Ligny-le-Château who joined his brother on the Crusade of 1101. The other was Hugh of Nevers, only mentioned in a charter dating to 1144.

== Count ==
The Origine et Historia Brevi Nivernensium Comitum mentions that Renaud II served as co-ruler to his father but predeceased him on 5 August 1089. His death left William I as the only Count of Nevers and William II as his heir apparent. On 20 June 1098, his grandfather died and William II succeeded to the County of Nevers. (William II should not be confused with his paternal uncle William of Nevers, Count of Tonnere).

He took part in the Crusade of 1101. He set out in February 1101 with 15,000 men, but his army failed to take the heavily garrisoned Seljuk-controlled Konya and was virtually wiped out during the disastrous Battle of Heraclea Cybistra. He arrived in Antioch with only a handful of knights.

He persuaded Louis VI to break peace with Henry I and throw his support behind William Clito in 1115. He was imprisoned shortly afterwards by Theobald, Count of Blois.

He participated in the Council of Troyes which opened on 14 January 1129 and is known for his support of the Second Crusade.

He is believed to have been buried in Chartreuse, where Bernard of Clairvaux attempted and failed to resurrect him.

== Marriage and children ==
William II married Adelais. Her family name and ancestry are unknown. They had at least four children.:

- William III, Count of Nevers (c. 1107 – 21 November 1161).
- Renaud of Nevers, Count of Tonnerre (d. 1148). Died while participating in the Second Crusade.
- Robert of Nevers. Only mentioned in a charter dating to 1134.
- Anne of Nevers. Married William VIII, Count of Auvergne.

French nobility
Preceded by William I	Count of Nevers, Count of Auxerre; 1098–1148	Succeeded by William III
