= John, Count of Eu =

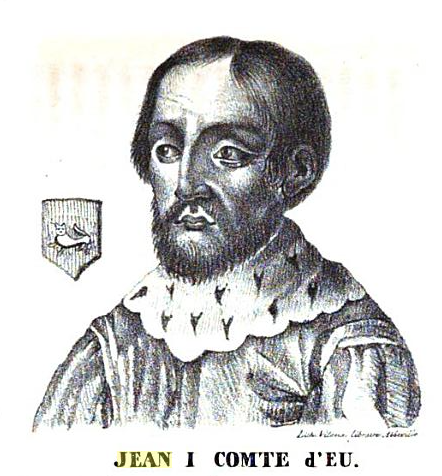

John, Count of Eu, (died 26 June 1170), son of Henry I, Count of Eu, and Marguerite, daughter of William, Count of Sully. John was Count of Eu and Lord of Hastings.

John obtained from Stephen, King of England, the honors of Tickhill and Blyth, being a descendant of their original owner, Roger de Busli, by his paternal grandmother Beatrice. John lost his holdings after his capture by Ranulf de Gernon, the 4th Earl of Chester, at the Battle of Lincoln in February 1141.

In 1148, John returned to Hilaire, Bishop of Chichester, lands belonging to his diocese which his father had usurped during the troubled reign of Stephen. John had to take refuge in the summer of 1167 in Drincourt (now Neufchâtel-en-Bray) during the invasion of his estates by the troops of Louis VII, an ally of Thierry, Count of Flanders.

John married Alice, daughter of William d'Aubigny, 1st Earl of Arundel and Adeliza of Louvain, the widow of King Henry I of England. John and Alice had three children:

- Henry II of Eu, 6th Count of Eu, Lord of Hastings
- Robert of Eu (d. 1191 in Acre)
- Mathilde d'Eu (d. 1212), married to Henry d'Estouteville, Seigneur of Valmont.

In addition,

- John d'Eu, Lord of Eu and Hastings, issued a confirmation charter to Robertsbridge Abbey, Sussex, c. 1198–1205.

Like his father Henry, John became canon at the abbey of Eu, where he died on 26 June 1170, after devoting the rest of his days to the monastic state. He was placed in the tomb of his father behind the altar. At the time of the destruction of the Abbey of Foucarmont in 1791, Louis Jean Marie de Bourbon, Duke of Penthièvre and Count of Eu, had the remains of the counts Henry and John reclaimed and moved to the chapel of the fr:Château de Bizy.

John was succeeded as Count of Eu and Lord of Hastings by his son Henry upon his death. John was buried at Fécamp Abbey, where many of his sons and grandsons would also be interred.

== Sources ==
- Davies, Ralph Henry Carless (2014). King Stephen. Taylor & Francis.
- Flanders, Steve (2008). De Courcy: Anglo-Normans in Ireland, England and France in the Eleventh and Twelfth Centuries. Four Courts Press.
- Holt, J. C. (1997). Colonial England, 1066-1215. Bloomsbury.
- Power, Daniel (2007). The Norman Frontier in the Twelfth and Early Thirteenth Centuries. Cambridge University Press.
