= Philip of Cleves (bishop) =

German Catholic bishop (1467-1505)

- Bishop of Autun
- Native name: Philippe de Clèves
- Church: Catholic Church
- Diocese: Diocese of Autun
- In office: 9 August 1503 – 5 March 1505
- Predecessor: Louis d'Amboise
- Successor: Jacques Hurault de Cheverny
- Previous posts: Administrator of Amiens (1501-1503); Bishop of Nevers (1500-1503)

Personal details
- Born: 1 January 1467
- Died: 5 March 1505 (aged 38)
- Parents: John I, Duke of Cleves; Elizabeth of Nevers

Philip of Cleves (1 January 1467 – 5 March 1505) was a son of John I, duke of Cleves, and Elizabeth of Nevers. After several minor ecclesiastical posts, Philip was bishop of Nevers from 1500 until his death. He was also bishop of Amiens from 1501 to 1503. In 1505, he was bishop of Autun for a short time.

Philip of Cleves (bishop) House of La Marck Born: 1 January 1467 Died: 5 March 1505
Preceded by Pierre VI de Fontenai	Bishop of Nevers; 1500-1505	Succeeded by Antoine de Fleurs
Preceded by Pierre I Versé	Bishop of Amiens; 1501-1503	Succeeded by François II de Hallvyn
Preceded by Louis I d'Amboise	Bishop of Autun; 1505	Succeeded by Jacques II Hurault de Cheverny
