= County of Auxerre =

County in France

County of Auxerre Conté de Auxerre (French)
- 8th century–1370
- Status: County
- Capital: Auxerre
- Common languages: Old French
- Government: Monarchy
- Count of Auxerre
  - ~770: Peonius (first)
  - 1370: John IV
- Historical era: Middle Ages
  - First count mentioned: 8th century
  - Sold to France: 1370
Preceded by	Succeeded by
Francia	Kingdom of France
- Today part of: France

The County of Auxerre was a medieval and early modern county in the West Frankish Kingdom, and consequently in the Kingdom of France. Its capital was the city of Auxerre. It was commonly associated with the Duchy of Burgundy.

== History ==
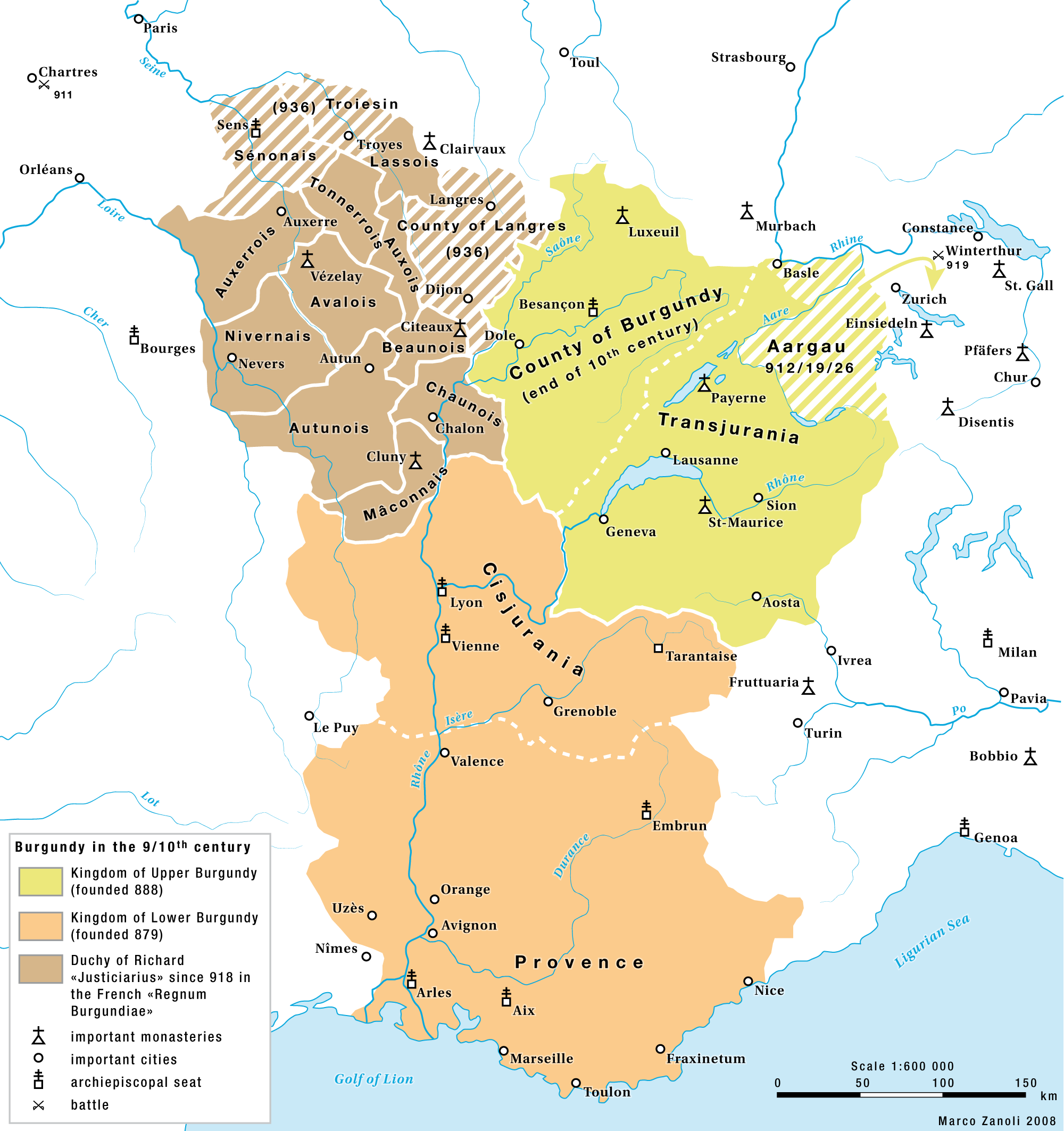
Burgundian lands (ca. 900) Duchy of Burgundy, including the County of Auxerre Upper Burgundy Lower Burgundy

The first count attested by the sources is one Ermenaud, a companion of Charlemagne who reigned around 770. Sometime around 853/858, king Charles the Bald handed over the county to his cousin Conrad the Younger, from the Elder House of Welf, whose father Conrad the Elder was lay abbot of Saint-Germaine in Auxerre. When he left for Transjuran Burgundy, the county was assigned to Robert the Strong. After the latter's death, he county was administered by Hugh the Abbot of Saint-Germain d'Auxerre. County of Auxerre was later included into the Burgundian dominion of duke Richard the Justiciar.

Count John IV sold it to the King of France in 1370. After the Treaty of Arras (1435) between Charles VII of France and Philip III of Burgundy, it returned once again to the latter. In 1477, with the annexion of Burgundy, it became definitively part of France.

== List of counts ==
- Peonius, under Chlothar I
- Ermenaud I of Auxerre, ca. 758
- Ermenaud II of Auxerre ca. 800
- Ermenaud III of Auxerre, ca. 840
- Jouvert of Auxerre, ca. 853
- Conrad the Younger, ca. 853/858–864
- Robert the Strong, 864–866
- Hugh the Abbot, brother of count Conrad the Younger, 866–886
- Richard the Justiciar, 886–921, married Adelaide, daughter of count Conrad the Younger
- Rudolph of France (also Raoul or Ralph), 921–923 until his election as King of France
- Hugh the Black, 923–952
- Gilbert of Chalon, 952–956
- Otto of Paris, 956–965
- Otto-Henry 965–1002
- Landerich of Monceau, 1002–1028
- Renauld, son of Landerich, 1028–1040
- Robert I, Duke of Burgundy, briefly in 1040
- William I, Count of Nevers, son of Renauld, 1040–1083
- Renauld II of Nevers (son) 1083–1089 (count of Auxerre and Nevers)
- William II, Count of Nevers (son) 1097–1148 (count of Auxerre, Tonnerre and Nevers)
- William III, Count of Nevers (son) 1148–1161 (count of Auxerre, Tonnerre and Nevers)
- William IV, Count of Nevers (son) 1161–1168 (count of Auxerre, Tonnerre and Nevers)
- Guy I of Nevers (brother) 1168–1175 (count of Tonnerre, Auxerre and Nevers)
- William V, Count of Nevers (son) 1175–1181 (count of Auxerre, Tonnerre and Nevers)
- Agnes I of Nevers (sister) 1181–1192
- Peter II of Courtenay 1184–1218 (married to Agnes)
- Mahault I of Coutenay (daughter) 1218–1257
- Hervé of Donzy 1218–1222 (married to Mahault)
- Agnes II of Donzy (daughter) 1218–1225 (deceased before her mother)
- Guy II of Châtillon, count of Saint Pol 1223–1225 (married to Agnes II)
- Gaucher of Châtillon (son) ? (deceased)
- Yolande of Châtillon (daughter) ?–1254
- Archambaud of Dampierre ?–1249 (Archambaud IX Lord of Bourbon) (married to Yolande)
- Mahaut of Dampierre (daughter) 1257–1262
- Odo of Burgundy 1257–1262 (married to Mahaut)
- Alix of Burgundy (daughter) 1251–1290
- John I 1273–1290 (married to Alix, joint rulers)
- William VI the Great (son) 1290–1304
- John II (son) 1304–1361
- John III (son) 1361–1370
- John IV (son) 1370, sold to Charles V of France
- Philip (also duke of Burgundy) (1435–1467), granted as a peerage in the Treaty of Arras
- Charles (also duke of Burgundy) (1467–1477)
- Reverted to the French crown

== See also ==
- Nevers
- Duchy of Burgundy

== Sources ==
- McKitterick, Rosamond (1983). The Frankish Kingdoms Under the Carolingians, 751-987. Harlow: Longman.
- Nelson, Janet L. (1992). Charles the Bald. London and New York: Longman.
- Nelson, Janet L. (1996). The Frankish World, 750-900. London: The Hambledon Press.
- Potter, David L. (1995). A History of France, 1460–1560: The Emergence of a Nation. Basingstoke: Macmillan.
- Reuter, Timothy (1992). The Annals of Fulda. Manchester: Manchester University Press.
- Riché, Pierre (1993). The Carolingians: A Family Who Forged Europe. Philadelphia: University of Pennsylvania Press.
