= Villaines-en-Duesmois =

- Commune
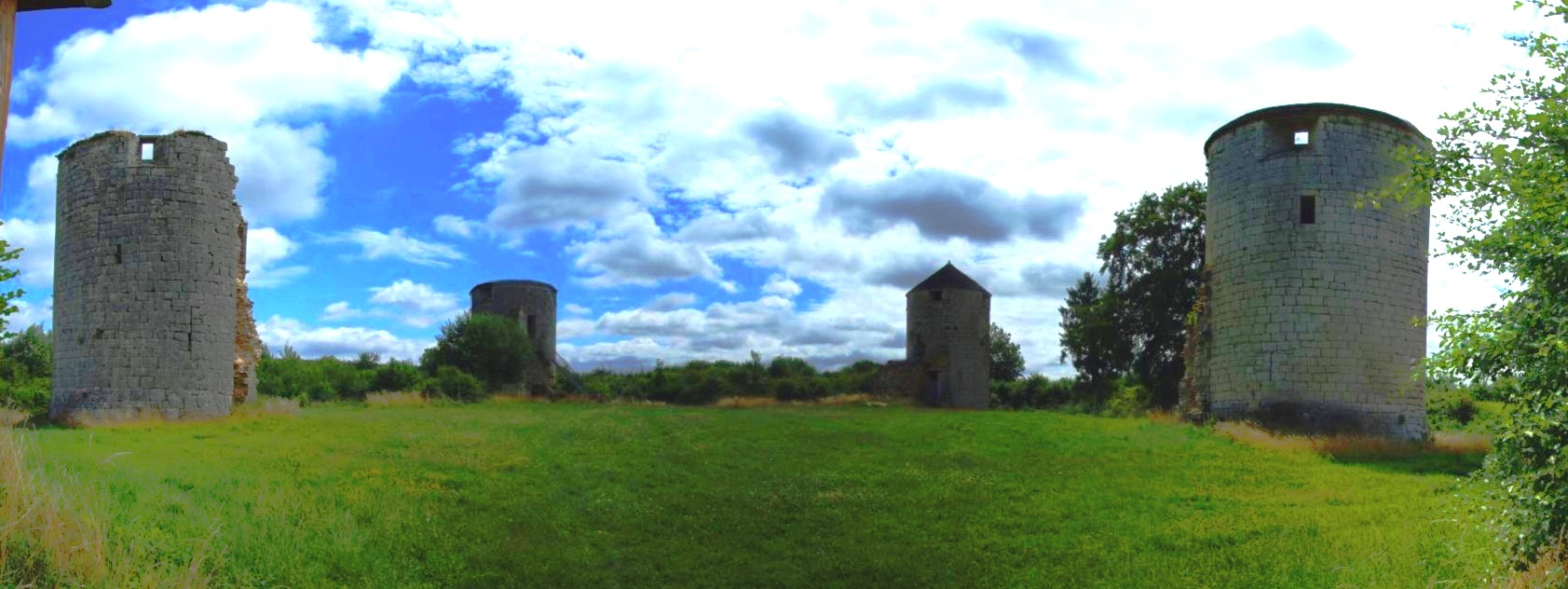
- The chateau of Villaines-en-Duesmois

- Coat of arms
- Location of Villaines-en-Duesmois
- Location within France Location within Bourgogne-Franche-Comté
- Coordinates: 47°40′59″N 4°31′36″E
- Country: France
- Region: Bourgogne-Franche-Comté
- Department: Côte-d'Or
- Arrondissement: Montbard
- Canton: Châtillon-sur-Seine
- Intercommunality: Pays Châtillonnais

Government
  - Mayor (2020–2026): Claude Fontaine
- Area^{1}: 33.95 km^{2} (13.11 sq mi)
- Elevation: 315 m (1,033 ft)
- Highest elevation: 402 m (1,319 ft)
- Lowest elevation: 306 m (1,004 ft)
- Population (2023): 252
  - Density: 7.42/km^{2} (19.2/sq mi)
- Time zone: UTC+01:00 (CET)
  - Summer (DST): UTC+02:00 (CEST)
- INSEE/Postal code: 21685 /21450
- ^{1} French Land Register data, which excludes lakes, ponds, glaciers > 1 km^{2} (0.386 sq mi or 247 acres) and river estuaries.

Villaines-en-Duesmois is a commune in the Côte-d'Or department in eastern France.

== Population ==
Historical population
| Year | Pop. | ±% p.a. |
|---|---|---|
| 1968 | 408 | — |
| 1975 | 328 | −3.07% |
| 1982 | 292 | −1.65% |
| 1990 | 258 | −1.54% |
| 1999 | 251 | −0.31% |
| 2007 | 301 | +2.30% |
| 2012 | 259 | −2.96% |
| 2017 | 252 | −0.55% |
| 2023 | 252 | +0.00% |
Source: INSEE

== See also ==
- Communes of the Côte-d'Or department
