= William IV of Nevers =

William IV, (French: Guillaume IV, c. 1130 – Acre, 24 October 1168) was count of Nevers, Auxerre, and Tonnerre from 1161 until his death.

== Family ==
William was a son of William III of Nevers and Ida of Sponheim, and the older brother of his successor Guy, Count of Nevers. In 1164, William married Eleanor of Vermandois. Their marriage was childless.

== Crusades ==
William was knighted in 1159, only two years prior to the death of his father. He and his brothers, Guy and Reynold, are considered to have been quite young at the time of William III's death; Guy was still mentioned as underage in 1164. William IV resided in the chateaux of Nevers and of Clamecy (present day department of the Nièvre, Burgundy, France). The next nearest town to the east of Clamecy is Vezelay, which, in the early medieval period, was the marshalling point for the start of several crusades to the Holy Land.

Vézelay Abbey was often in conflict with the counts of Nevers. William IV had his provost Léthard force the monks to take flight and abandon the abbey. In 1166, Louis VII of France arranged a reconciliation between William IV and Guillaume de Mello, abbot of Vézelay. On 6 January 1167 (Epiphany), Louis VII attended the celebration over the reconciliation. In atonement for his supposed crimes against the church, William set out for the Crusader states. In 1168, William of Tyre records the arrival of the Count of Nevers in Jerusalem. In the meantime, Amalric I was preparing for the invasion of Egypt. However, William died shortly afterwards, and he was buried in Bethlehem. Later on, most of his knights participated in Amalric's campaign, and were probably responsible for the massacre of the population of Bilbeis.

== Bishopric of Bethlehem ==
Before his death in 1168, he promised the bishop of Bethlehem that if Bethlehem should ever fall into Muslim hands, he would welcome him or his successors in Clamecy. After the capture of Bethlehem by Saladin in 1187, the bequest of the now deceased count was honoured and the bishop of Bethlehem duly took up residence in the Hospital of Panthenor, Clamecy, which remained the continuous in partibus infidelium seat of the Bishopric of Bethlehem for almost 600 years until the French Revolution in 1789.

French nobility
Preceded by William III	Count of Nevers and Auxerre; 1161–1168	Succeeded by Guy
