= Charles of Artois, Count of Eu =

Count of Eu

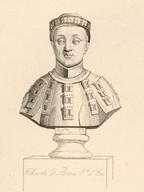
Charles of Artois, Count of Eu

Charles of Artois (1394 – 25 July 1472), was Count of Eu from 23 December 1397 until his death 75 years later. He was son of Philip of Artois, Count of Eu, and Marie of Berry. Charles was taken prisoner by the English at the Battle of Agincourt on 25 October 1415 and was not released until 1438. In 1448, he married Jeanne of Saveuse (died 1449), and on 23 September 1454, Helene of Melun (d. 1473), but he had no children. He was appointed Lieutenant of the King in Normandy and Guyenne, as well as Governor of Paris, during the War of the Public Weal in 1465.

Charles was the last legitimate male member of the House of Artois and was succeeded in his titles by his nephew John II, Count of Nevers.

== Sources ==
- Curry, Anne; Mercer, Malcolm, eds. (2017). The Battle of Agincourt. Yale University Press.
- Rohr, Zita Eva (2016). Yolande of Aragon (1381-1442) Family and Power: The Reverse of the Tapestry. Palgrave Macmillan.

Preceded by Philip	Count of Eu; 1397–1472	Succeeded by John
