= Armorial d'Auvergne =

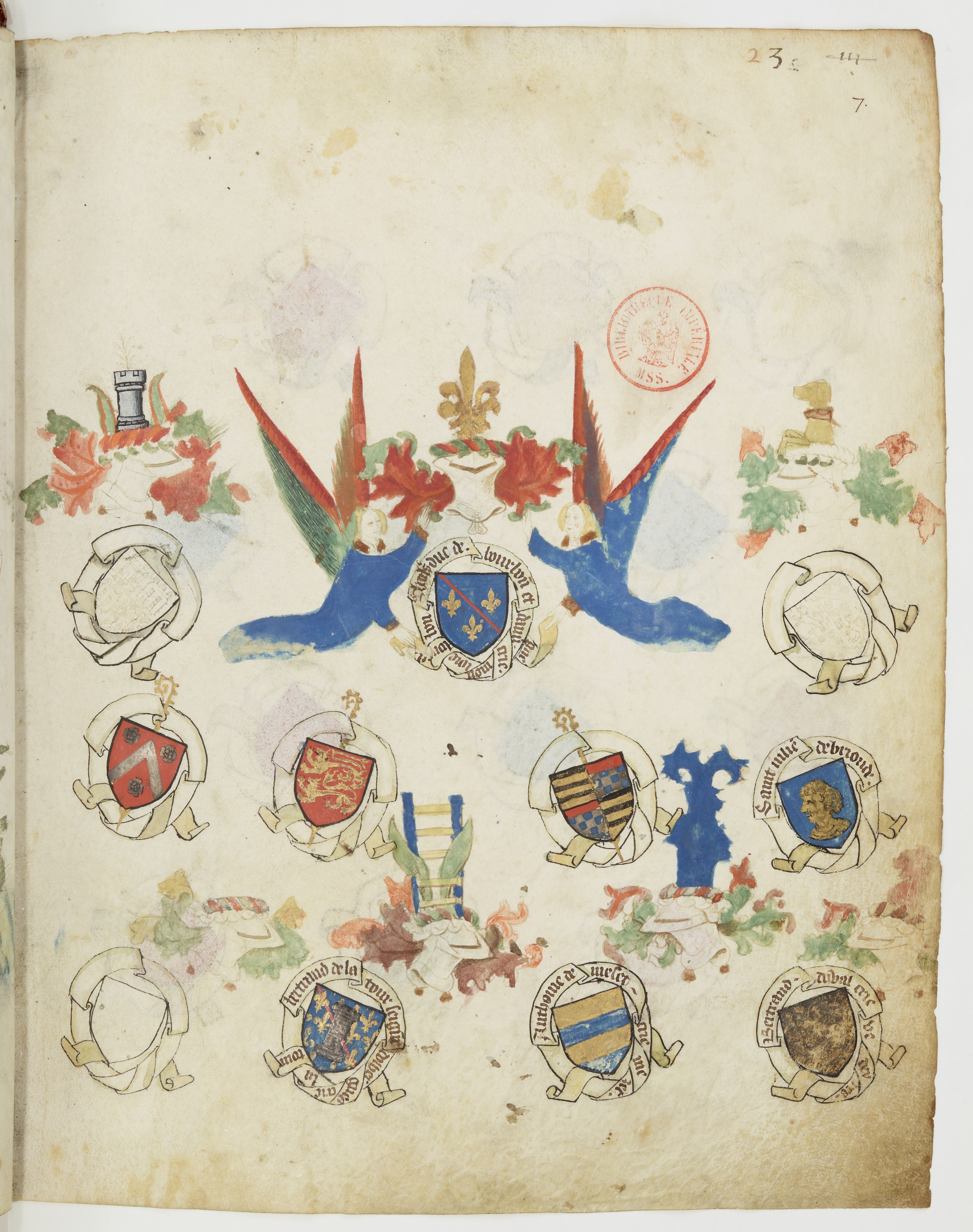
“Register of arms”/armorial of Auvergne, manuscript by Guillaume Revel

The Armorial d'Auvergne is a 15th-century manuscript by Guillaume Revel, composed initially for Charles I, Duke of Bourbon but dedicated to Charles VII of France. It contains pages dedicated to the Duke's holdings in Auvergne, Forez, and Bourbon, with most pages containing a sketch and/or watercolor illuminations of the region named at the top of the page as well as sketches and/or colored miniatures of the associated heraldic arms in the form of a shield or helmets. It is housed at the Bibliothèque nationale de France as ms. 22297.

== The manuscript ==
The original, incomplete manuscript is composed on parchment in-4°. It consists of 253 leaves and is today housed at the Bibliothèque nationale de France. There are several partial posterior copies.

Under the direction of Guillaume Revel, several artists drew up sketches and studies of the duke's holdings before they were completed by workshops. Several hands can be distinguished, leading to the conclusion that this is in fact a collective work.

== Editions ==
- Emmanuel de Boos, L'armorial d'Auvergne, Bourbonnois et Forestz de Guillaume Revel, 1998, 3 volumes : I. - Études et commentaires, 658 p. II. - Atlas et planches, 395 p. III. - Plan de montage, arbres généalogiques et cartes, 48 p. ISBN 9782848192956
- L'Armorial de Guillaume Revel, édition d'une des anciennes copies concernant le Forez sous la direction de Pierre-Yves Laffont, Collection des documents d'archéologie en Rhôme-Alpes et en Auvergne (DARA), 2011.
