= Bonne of Artois =

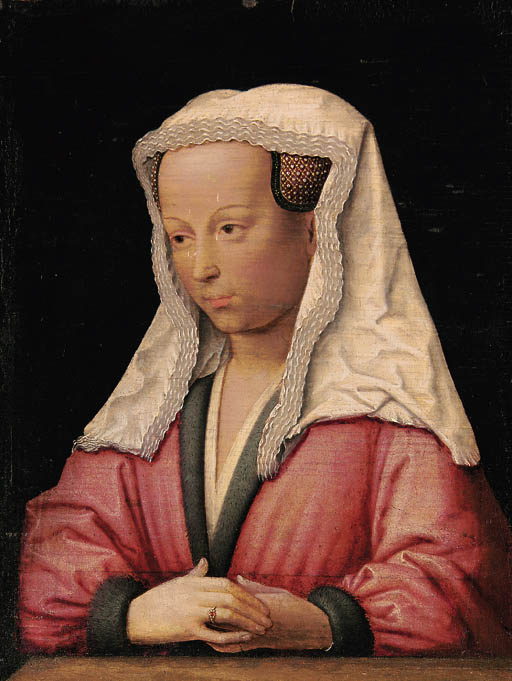

Duchess consort of Burgundy
- Tenure: 30 November 1424 – 15 September 1425

Countess consort of Nevers
- Tenure: 20 June 1413 – 25 October 1415
- Born: 1396
- Died: 15 September 1425 (28–29); Dijon
- Spouse: Philip II, Count of Nevers (m. 1413; died 1415) Philip III, Duke of Burgundy (m. 1424)
- Issue: Charles I, Count of Nevers; John II, Count of Nevers
- House: Artois
- Father: Philip of Artois, Count of Eu
- Mother: Marie of Berry

Bonne of Artois (1396 – 15 September 1425, Dijon) was Countess consort of Nevers by marriage to Philip II, Count of Nevers, which left her a widow at 18 or 19, and Duchess consort of Burgundy by marriage to Philip III, Duke of Burgundy, popularly known as Philip the Good. She served as regent of the County of Nevers during the minority of her son from 1415 until 1424.

== Life ==
Bonne was the daughter of Philip of Artois, Count of Eu, and Marie of Berry, daughter of John, Duke of Berry.

=== Countess of Nevers ===
Bonne married first at Beaumont-en-Artois on 20 June 1413, Philip II, Count of Nevers. He was the son of Philip the Bold and Margaret III, Countess of Flanders.

Philip was killed at the Battle of Agincourt in 1415, against the English king Henry V, who won the battle against Charles d'Albret and Charles VI of France.

=== Regent ===
Their eldest son Charles succeeded as Count of Nevers. However, due to the child's minority, Bonne acted as regent from 1415 until 1424. She succeeded her aunt Jeanne d'Artois as Mademoiselle de Dreux and as Dame de Houdain.

=== Duchess of Burgundy ===
After Philip's death, Bonne married his nephew Philip the Good, Duke of Burgundy, on 30 November 1424 at Moulins-les-Engelbert. His first marriage to Michelle of Valois had produced no surviving issue and she had died young, so Philip married Bonne.

Bonne is sometimes confused with Philip's biological aunt, also named Bonne of Burgundy (1379–1399) in part due to the papal dispensation required for the marriage which made no distinction between a marital aunt and a biological aunt.

The marriage of Bonne and Philip lasted less than a year and produced no children. Bonne died on 15 September 1425 in Dijon.

== Issue ==
Bonne and Philip of Nevers had:

- Charles I of Nevers (1414 - 25 May 1464) married Marie d'Albret
- John II, Count of Nevers (1415–1491)

== Sources ==
- Autrand, Françoise (2009). Christine de Pizan, une femme en politique (in French). Fayard. ISBN 9782213636429.
- Curry, Anne (2002). The Battle of Agincourt: Sources and Interpretations. The Boydell Press. ISBN 9780851158020.
- Michelet, Jules (1907). Renault, E. (ed.). Louis XI Et Charles Le Téméraire. Clarendon Press.
- Vaughan, Richard (2010). Philip the Good: The Apogee of Burgundy. The Boydell Press. ISBN 9780851159171.
- Warren, Nancy Bradley (2016). "The Life and Afterlives of St. Colette of Corbie: Religion, Politics, and Networks of Power". In Mueller, Joan; Warren, Nancy (eds.). A Companion to Colette of Corbie. Brill. pp. 6–31. ISBN 9789004309845.

Bonne of Artois House of Artois Cadet branch of the Capetian dynasty Born: 1396 Died: 15 September 1425
Royal titles
Preceded by Michelle of Valois	Duchess consort of Burgundy; 30 November 1424 – 15 September 1425	Succeeded by Isabella of Portugal
