= Philip of Artois, Count of Eu =

Count of Eu (1358–1397)

Constable of France Philip of Artois
- Count of Eu
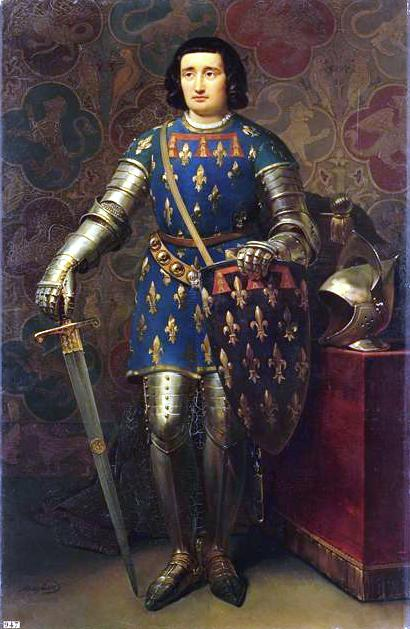
- Philip of Artois portrait by Jean-Baptiste Mauzaisse
- Born: 1358
- Died: 16 June 1397 (aged 38–39); Micalizo
- Noble family: Artois
- Spouse: Marie, Duchess of Auvergne (m. 1393)
- Issue: Philip of Artois; Charles of Artois, Count of Eu; Bonne of Artois; Catherine of Artois
- Father: John of Artois, Count of Eu
- Mother: Isabeau of Melun

Philip of Artois (1358 – 16 June 1397), sometimes Philip I, son of John of Artois, Count of Eu, and Isabeau of Melun, was Count of Eu from 1387 until his death, succeeding his brother Robert.

Philip was an ignoble and hotheaded soldier. In 1383, he captured the town of Bourbourg from the English. He went on a pilgrimage to the Holy Land and was imprisoned there by Barquq, the Sultan of Egypt, being released through the mediation of Jean Boucicaut and the Venetians. In 1390, he joined the unsuccessful expedition of Louis II, Duke of Bourbon, against Mahdia. In 1393, Philip was created Constable of France.

As a prominent crusader, Philip was one of the French contingent sent to take part in the Battle of Nicopolis. After forcing the French into battle, he was captured after the battle and subsequently died in captivity.

== Marriage ==
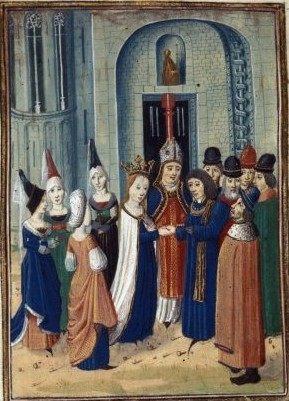
Wedding of Philip of Artois and Marie of Auvergne

On 27 January 1393, Philip married Marie (1367 – 1434), daughter of John, Duke of Berry. They had:

- Philip (1393 – 23 December 1397), likely already dead by the time news arrived in France of his father's death in an Ottoman Turk prison. Although he is buried in a tomb that names him as Count of Eu in the crypt of the Collegiale of Eu, he is generally not recognised as a count by historians and rarely given a regnal number.
- Charles, captured at Agincourt (1394 – 1472)
- Bonne (1396 – 17 September 1425, Dijon), married at Beaumont-en-Artois on 20 June 1413, Philip II, Count of Nevers, and afterwards at Moulins-les-Engelbert on 30 November 1424, Philip III, Duke of Burgundy
- Catherine (1397 – 1418/22), married c. 1416 John of Bourbon, Lord of Carency

== Sources ==
- Autrand, Françoise (2009). Christine de Pizan, une femme en politique (in French). Fayard. ISBN 9782213636429.
- Deck, Suzanne (1924). Bibliothèque de l'École des hautes études: Sciences historiques et philologiques (in French). Librairie Ancienne Edouard Champion.
- Green, Karen (2021). Joan of Arc and Christine de Pizan's Ditié. Rowman & Littlefield.
- McLeod, Enid (1970). Charles of Orleans, Prince and Poet. Viking Press.
- Setton, Kenneth Meyer (1976). The Papacy and the Levant, 1204-1571: The thirteenth and fourteenth centuries. American Philosophical Society.
- Taylor, Craig (2019). A Virtuous Knight: Defending Marshal Boucicaut (Jean II Le Meingre, 1366-1421). York Medieval Press.
- Vaughan, Richard (2010). Philip the Good. The Boydell Press.
- Walsingham, Thomas (2005). Clark, James G. (ed.). The Chronica Maiora of Thomas Walsingham, 1376-1422. The Boydell Press.
- Wilson, Katherine M. (1984). Medieval women writers. Manchester University Press.

Philip of Artois, Count of Eu House of Artois Cadet branch of the Capetian dynasty Born: 1358 Died: 16 June 1397
Preceded by Robert	Count of Eu; 1387–1397	Succeeded by Charles
