= Counts and dukes of Nevers =

Rulers of the County of Nevers, France

The counts of Nevers were the rulers of the County of Nevers, in France, The territory became a duchy in the peerage of France in 1539 under the dukes of Nevers.

== History ==
The history of the County of Nevers is closely connected to the Duchy of Burgundy. The counts also held the County of Auxerre in the 11th and 12th centuries, and the county was held by the count of Flanders and then the duke of Burgundy again in the 14th century.

In 1539, it became a duchy in the peerage of France. For a time, it was held by a cadet branch of the House of Gonzaga. This branch inherited the Duchy of Mantua from the senior Gonzaga line (when it became extinct in 1627) and ruled Mantua until 1708, when the branch died out in the male line.

Charles IV Gonzaga sold the duchies of Nevers and Rethel in 1659 to Cardinal Mazarin. His family held the duchy of Nevers until the French Revolution.

== Counts of Nevers ==
Arms of Renauld I, Count of Nevers

- Otto-Henry (c.973–987; Duke of Burgundy, 965–1002)
- Otto-William (987–992; Duke of Burgundy (contender), 1002–1004)
- Landry (992–1028)
- Renaud I (also Count of Auxerre, 1031–1040)
- William I (also Count of Auxerre, 1040–1083)
- Renaud II (also Count of Auxerre, 1083–1097)
- William II (also Count of Auxerre, 1097–1148)
- William III (also Count of Auxerre, 1148–1161)
- William IV (also Count of Auxerre, 1161–1168)
- Guy (also Count of Auxerre, 1168–1175)
- William V (also Count of Auxerre, 1175–1181)
- Agnes I (1181–1192)
  - Peter II of Courtenay (1184–1192; Latin Emperor, 1216–1217)
- Matilda I (1192–1257)
  - Hervé (1199–1223)
    - Agnès II, who married Philip, eldest son of the future Louis VIII of France, then Guy II of Saint-Pol
      - Yolande I, who married Archambaud IX of Bourbon, had Matilda II
  - Guigues (1226–1241)
- Matilda II (also Countess of Auxerre, 1257–1262)
  - Odo (also Count of Auxerre, 1257–1262)
- Yolande II (1262–1280)
  - John Tristan (1265–1270)
  - Robert III (1272–1280); Count of Flanders (1305–1322)
- Louis I (1280–1322), son of Yolande II and Robert III
- Louis II (also Count of Flanders, 1322–1346)
- Louis III (also Count of Flanders, 1346–1384) (on his death, the title passed directly to his grandson John, although John's mother Margaret, Countess of Flanders, and her husband Philip II, Duke of Burgundy received other titles)
- John I (1384–1404; John the Fearless, Duke of Burgundy, 1404–1419)
- Philip II (1404–1415), younger brother of John the Fearless
- Charles I (1415–1464)
- John II (1464–1491)
- Engelbert (1491–1506)
- Charles II (1506–1521)
- François I (1521-1539)

== Dukes of Nevers ==
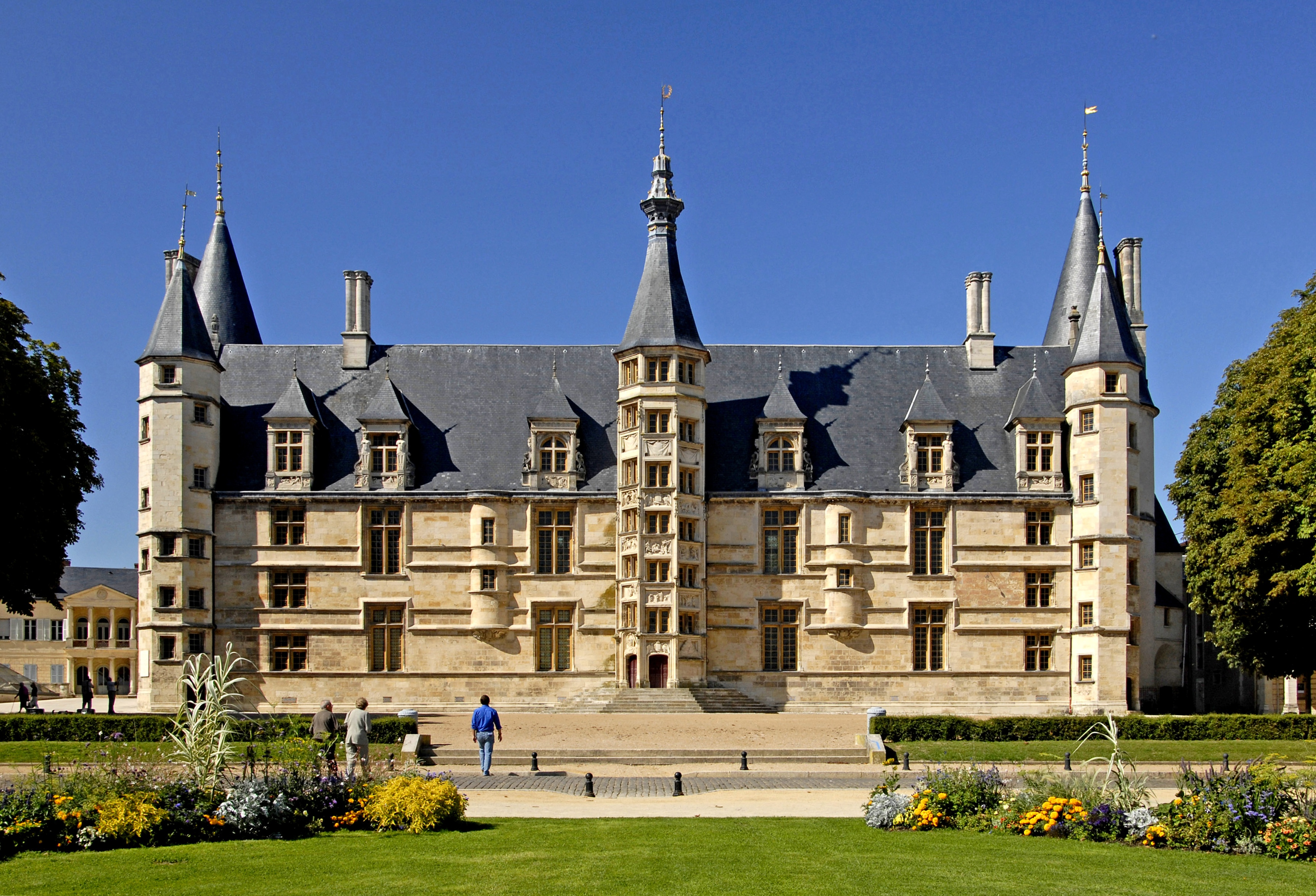
The Ducal Palace in Nevers

In 1539 the county of Nevers was raised to a duchy.

- François I (1539–1561) (His mother, Marie of Albret (d. 1549), widow of Charles II, also took the title in 1539, even though it was her son and his wife who became the actual duke and duchess.)
- François II (1561–1563)
- Jacques (1563–1564), his brother
- Henriette (1564–1601), his sister
  - Louis (1566–1595), her husband
- Charles III (1595–1637), also Duke of Mantua (1627–1637)
- Charles IV (1637–1659), also Duke of Mantua (1637–1665), sold the Duchies of Nevers and Rethel in 1659 to Cardinal Mazarin
- Cardinal Mazarin (1659–1661)
- Philippe Jules (1661–1707), his nephew
- Philippe Jules François (1707–1768)
- Louis-Jules (1768–1798)

== Sources ==
- Antonetti, Guy (2000). "Les Princes Etrangers". In Bardet, Jean-Pierre (ed.). Etat et société en France aux XVIIe et XVIIIe siècles (in French). Presses l'Universite de Paris-Sorbonne.
