= Philip II of Nevers =

Burgundian noble (1389–1415)

Philip II, Count of Nevers
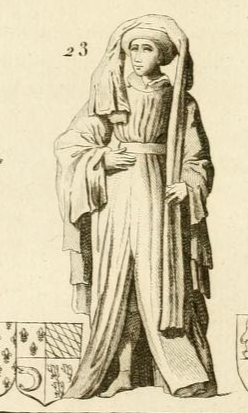
- Born: October 1389; Villaines-en-Duesmois
- Died: 25 October 1415 (aged 25–26)
- Noble family: Valois-Burgundy
- Spouses: Isabelle de Coucy (m. 1409; died 1411) Bonne of Artois (m. 1413)
- Issue: Philip of Nevers; Margaret of Nevers; Charles I of Nevers; John II, Count of Nevers
- Father: Philip the Bold
- Mother: Margaret III of Flanders

Phillip II (October 1389, Villaines-en-Duesmois – 25 October 1415, Agincourt), count of Nevers, was the youngest son of Philip the Bold and Margaret III of Flanders.

He succeeded his brothers, John the Fearless, Duke of Burgundy, and Anthony, Duke of Brabant, as Count of Nevers and Rethel respectively after each of them acceded to their duchies.

He married in Soissons, on 9 April 1409, Isabelle de Coucy (d. 1411), daughter of Enguerrand VII de Coucy and Isabelle of Lorraine. They had two children:

- Philip of Nevers (1410–1411/aft. 1415)
- Margaret of Nevers (1411–1411/1412)

He married again, in Beaumont-en-Artois on 20 June 1413, Bonne of Artois, daughter of Philip of Artois, Count of Eu. They had two sons:

- Charles I, Count of Nevers (1414–1464)
- John II, Count of Nevers (bef. 1415 – 1491)

He also had four illegitimate children by various mistresses.

In spite of his elder brother John's ambivalent position and ultimate refusal to come to the aid of the royal army in the face of the English invasion of Henry V in 1415, Philip was with the French army at the Battle of Agincourt, and both he and his brother Anthony were killed in the battle. He was succeeded by his son Charles.

Philip II of Nevers House of Valois-Burgundy Cadet branch of the House of Valois Born: October 1389 Died: 25 October 1415
Regnal titles
Preceded by John the Fearless	Count of Nevers; 1404–1415	Succeeded by Charles I
Preceded by Anthony	Count of Rethel; 1406–1415	Succeeded by Charles I
