= Jacques, Duke of Nevers =

French noble and peer (c. 1544 – 1564)

Jacques de Clèves
- Duke of Nevers; Count of Eu; Count of Rethel; Governor of the Nivernais
- Coat of arms of the duke of Nevers
- Born: c. 1544
- Died: 9 September 1564
- Noble family: House of La Marck
- Spouse: Diane de La Marck
- Father: François de Clèves
- Mother: Marguerite de Bourbon-Vendôme

Jacques de Clèves, duc de Nevers and comte d'Eu (c. 1544 – 6 September 1564) was a French duke, governor and military commander during the early French Wars of Religion. The son of the duke of Nevers and Marguerite de Bourbon he succeeded his brother as duke of Nevers and count of Rethel and Eu after his elder brother died of wounds sustained at the Battle of Dreux. This made him a ducal peer of France. He would not however inherit his brothers' position as governor of Champagne. During his brief career he was faced with his families overwhelming debts, which the crown intervened in to avoid his situation inducing a more general financial crisis in the nobility. In 1563 he was established as governor of the Nivernais. He died on 9 September 1564, and in the absence of any offspring was succeeded by his sister Henriette de Clèves who married Louis de Gonzague therefore transferring the ducal title to a new family jure uxoris (through the rights of the wife).

== Early life and family ==
=== Family ===
Jacques de Clèves was the son of François de Clèves and Marguerite de Bourbon. François was one of the richest nobles in France, possessing the duchy of Nevers at the southern edge of Champagne, and then inside Champagne: the county of Rethel, the barony of Ervy-le-Chastel, the viscounty of Saint-Florentin, the marquisate de l'Isle. Through his mother he had ties to the House of Bourbon-Vendôme, with the king of Navarre and prince of Condé as uncles.

=== Marriage ===
In 1558 Nevers was married to Diane de La Marck, third daughter of Robert IV de La Marck, the duke of Bouillon and Françoise de Brézé but the two would not have any offspring prior to Nevers' early death in 1564. The La Marck family gained a reputation as Protestants in this time period, with their principality of Sedan becoming a refuge for Protestants. Therefore, the Clèves line of dukes would terminate with him.

=== Inheritance ===
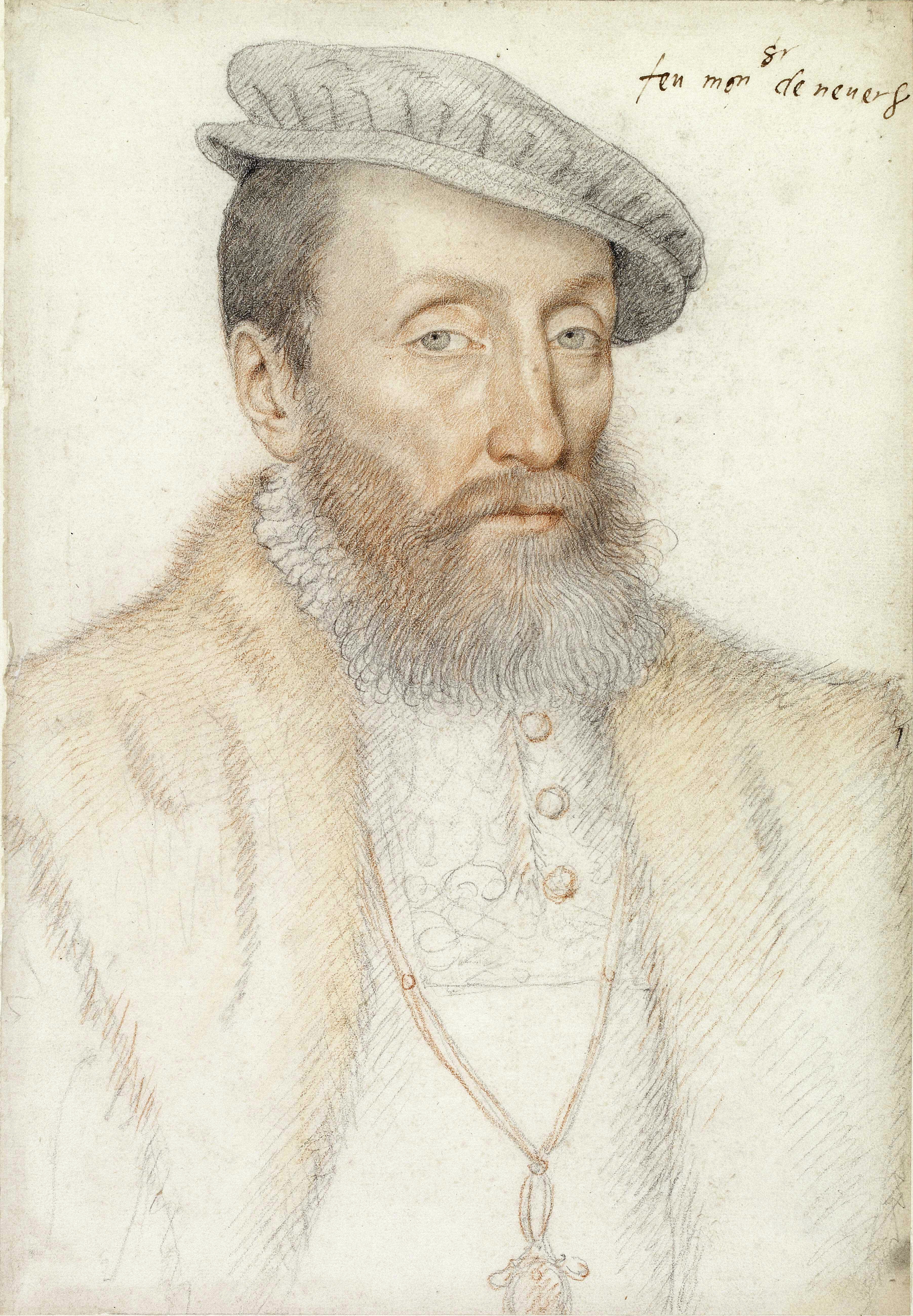
Portrait of Nevers' father, François I de Clèves, duke of Nevers

Upon the death of his father, Jacques became baron de Jaucourt, d'Ervy, de Chaource, de Villemaur et de Maraye and marquis de l'Isle. He also gained the county of Beaufort. Meanwhile, his elder brother became duke of Nevers.

== Reign of Charles IX ==
=== Military command ===
In early 1561 his father died, and Nevers inherited his military command of 40 lances in a royal ordinance company.

With the outbreak of the First War of Religion in 1562, his elder brother was initially tempted by the Protestant cause and promised the prince of Condé that he would join the Protestant army. However he would betray the promise and remain loyal to the royal cause. Like his elder brother, Nevers was for a time drawn to the Protestant faith, this was reinforced by his relations to the duke of Bouillon through his wife.

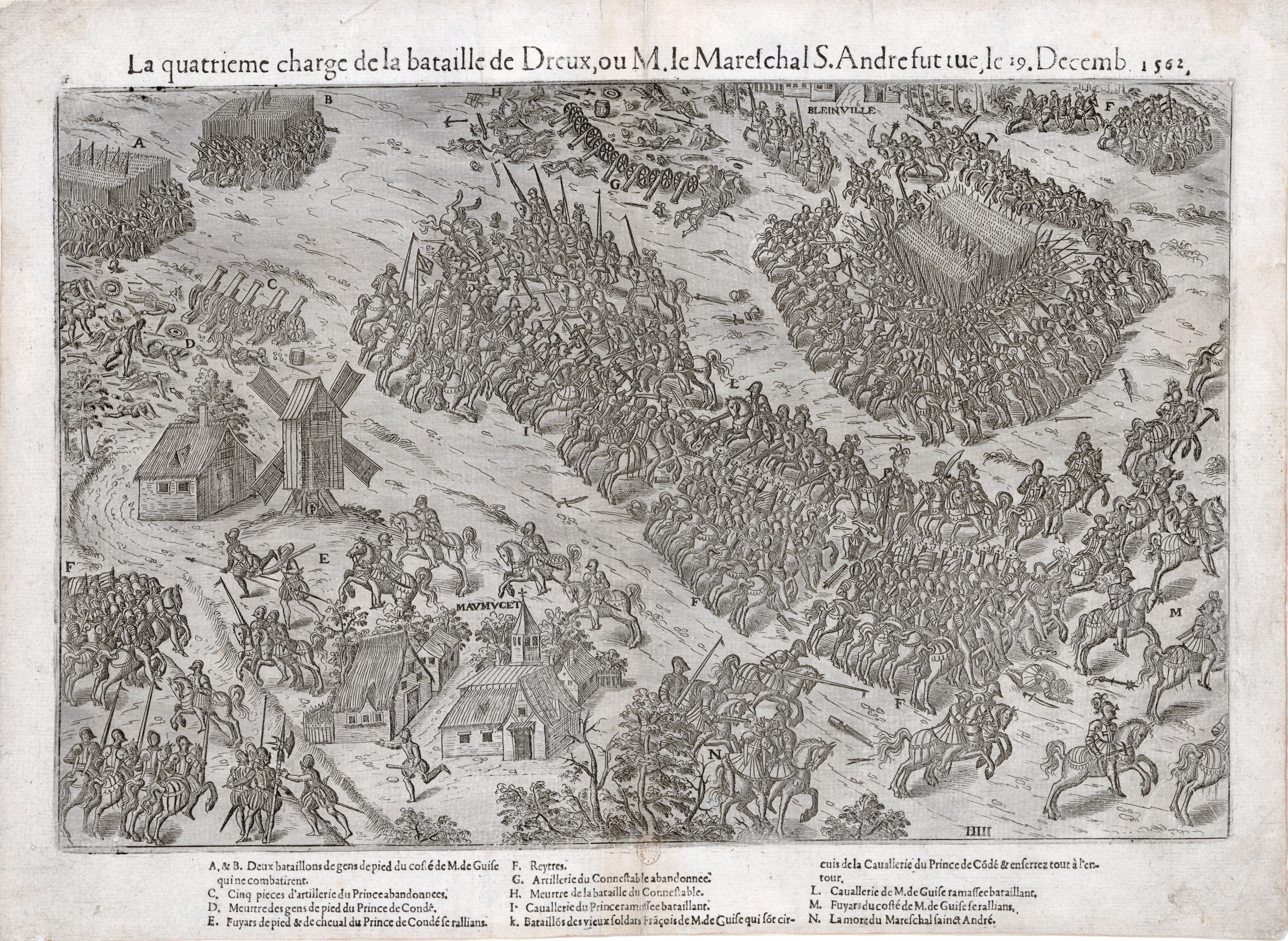
Rendition of the Battle of Dreux at which his elder brother, François II de Clèves, duke of Nevers would be killed, leaving the inheritance to him

His elder brother, the duke of Nevers would fight in the climactic battle of the First War of Religion at Dreux. During the combat he would be receive wounds of which he would die on 10 January 1563. With his death, Jacques took over the notable parts of his father's inheritance from his brother, that had been considered indivisible by the brother's father when he conferred them all to François in the partage of March 1560. This included possession of the families sovereign possessions. Jacques then provided some of the titles he had originally received in the partage to his sister Henriette. Nevers would not however inherit his governorship of Champagne, which went to the duke of Guise, the Clèves family had held the government since 1545. This followed the pattern of establishing men with powerful local interests in the post of governor.

=== Financial situation ===
Shortly before his death, in early January 1563, king Charles had granted Nevers permission to begin selling off family lands to satisfy his debts. Though the death of the duke would impede this, the process of relieving the debt would continue under his successor in the following months. The crown feared that if the financial situation of the Clèves was not solved, it was cause a more general cascade of financial failure among the nobility as their various creditors were also penured. This in turn was felt as likely to jeopardise the peace of the kingdom.

Now duke of Nevers, he tasked his ducal council (which included men such as Pierre Séguier, président of the Paris Parlement and François du Pontot the bailli of the Nivernais) with combatting the extensive debts that had been accrued under his immediate predecessor. To assist him in this, his maternal uncles Cardinal Bourbon and the prince of Condé petitioned the crown on his behalf, highlighting the heavy burden of debt that Nevers was subject to. Indeed, according to Crouzet his debts totalled 493,000 livres at this time.

=== Governor of the Nivernais ===
The region of the Nivernais was largely dominated by the Clèves family (the lieutenant-generalcy having been first acquired by the family in 1505) and possessed no royal governor prior to the establishment of Nevers as governor of the province on 15 June 1563.

In May 1564 the royal conseil privé (privy council) took further steps to protect Nevers from his debts, calling upon the chambre des comptes of the duke to begin looking into solutions. The king's mother Catherine de Medici wrote to two of the duke's councillors (Pierre Séguier and Charles Lamoignon) who were to be lead the effort. She informed them that she was intervening at the request of Nevers and Bourbon. The men would administer his debts and oversee necessary liquidations to restore his solvency. There was friction between these two agents of the crown and Nevers, the former complaining that the ducal council tried to involve itself in the business of debt management that they were overseeing. They began planning the alienation of components of Nevers' domains, including the seigneuries of Aspremont, Briost and Ressons. Potential buyers were to come directly to them as opposed to the duke. Nevers for his part was prepared to alienate the seigneurie of Beu. However his death would interefere with this project.

=== Death ===
Nevers died on 6 September 1564, and with him died the male line of the Clèves family.

Since the beginning of the French Wars of Religion, the financial situation of the house had been deteriorating, and this was only accelerated by the extinction of the male line. Soon thereafter the family was on the verge of bankruptcy.

=== Clèves inheritance ===
With the death of Nevers, his sister Henriette de Clèves became much sought after by suitors. Louis de Gonzague was able to secure a marriage with her, and thus became jure uxoris the duke of Nevers. A full partage of the inheritance that Nevers had left on his death was undertaken by the crown on 1 March 1566. Henriette maintained the main body of the inheritance, but her younger sister Catherine de Clèves received the county of Eu (worth around 28,000 livres in revenues), and Marie de Clèves several baronies in the county of Eu, and the families lands in the Île de France.

It was not possible for the Clèves possession of the governate of Champagne to be returned to the dukes of Nevers upon the assumption of the title by Louis; though the monarchy would have liked to diminish Guise's power they were unable to. In 1569 Louis would be granted the governate of the Nivernais that Jacques had held however.

== Sources ==
- Boltanski, Ariane (2006). Les ducs de Nevers et l'État royal: genèse d'un compromis (ca 1550 - ca 1600). Librairie Droz.
- Carroll, Stuart (2011). Martyrs and Murderers: The Guise Family and the Making of Europe. Oxford University Press. IA.
- Konnert, Mark (2006). Local Politics in the French Wars of Religion: The Towns of Champagne, the Duc de Guise and the Catholic League 1560-1595. Ashgate.
- Harding, Robert (1978). Anatomy of a Power Elite: the Provincial Governors in Early Modern France. Yale University Press. IA.
- Jouanna, Arlette (1998). Histoire et Dictionnaire des Guerres de Religion. Bouquins.
