= Louis III, Cardinal of Guise =

Catholic cardinal (1575–1621)

- Cardinal, Archbishop of Reims
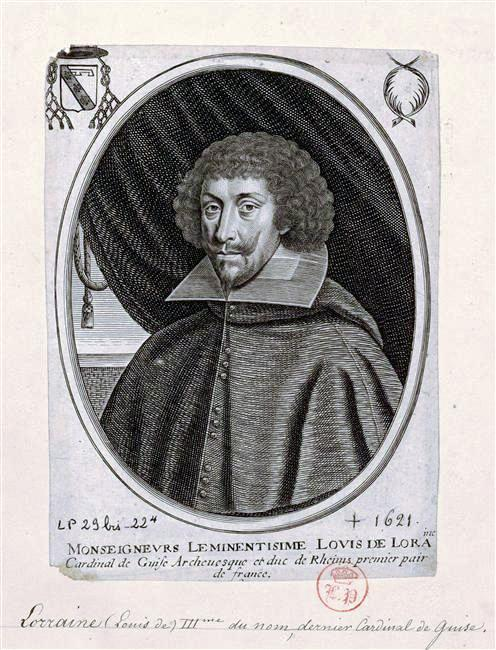
- Church: Roman Catholic Church
- Archdiocese: Reims
- In office: 1605-1621
- Predecessor: Philippe du Bec
- Successor: Gabriel Gifford
- Other post: Abbot of Cluny (1612-1621)
- Previous post: Coadjutor Archbishop of Reims (1601-1605)

Orders
- Created cardinal: 2 December 1615 by Pope Paul V

Personal details
- Born: 22 January 1575 Lorraine
- Died: 18 June 1621 (aged 46) Saintes
- Coat of arms

Louis de Lorraine known as the Cardinal de Guise (22 January 1575 – 21 June 1621, Saintes) was the second son of Henry I, Duke of Guise and Catherine of Cleves.

== Life ==
His ecclesiastical post was entirely a sinecure; he was never ordained, and led a dissipated life. Nevertheless, he was made Archbishop of Reims in January 1605, and created cardinal on December 2, 1615. He incurred the displeasure of Louis XIII, and was imprisoned in the Bastille in 1620. He joined the royal campaign to besiege the Huguenot stronghold of Montauban in 1621, and there fell ill with scarlet fever and died.

He married, in secret, Charlotte des Essarts, Mademoiselle de La Haye in 1611. They had five children:

1. Charles Louis (d. July 12, 1668, Auteuil), Abbot of Chaalis, Bishop of Condom
2. Achille (c. 1615–1648, Heraklion), Prince of Guise, Count of Romorantin, killed in the siege of Candia, married Anna Maria of Salm-Dhaun
3. Charlotte (d. bef. 1664), Abbess of St. Pierre, Lyon
4. Henri Hector (b. 1620)
5. Louise (d. July 5, 1662), married October 24, 1639 Claude Pot, Lord of Rhodes (d. August 3, 1642)

== Ancestry ==
Ancestors of Louis III, Cardinal of Guise

16. René de Lorraine, Duke of Lorraine
8. Claude de Lorraine, Duke of Guise
17. Philippa of Guelders
4. Francis de Lorraine, Duke of Guise
18. François de Bourbon, Count of Vendôme
9. Antoinette de Bourbon
19. Marie de Luxembourg
2. Henri de Lorraine, Duke of Guise
20. Alfonso I d'Este, Duke of Ferrara
10. Ercole II d'Este, Duke of Ferrara
21. Lucrezia Borgia
5. Anna d'Este
22. Louis XII of France
11. Princess Renée of France
23. Anne of Brittany
1. Louis de Lorraine
24. Engelbert, Count of Nevers
12. Charles de Cleves, Count of Nevers
25. Charlotte de Bourbon
6. François of Clèves, Duke of Nevers
26. Jean d'Albret, Baron d'Orval
13. Marie d'Albret, Countess of Rethel
27. Charlotte de Bourgogne; great grand daughter of Philip the Bold
3. Catherine of Cleves
28. François de Bourbon, Count of Vendôme =18
14. Charles de Bourbon, Duke of Vendôme
29. Marie de Luxembourg =19
7. Marguerite de Bourbon
30. René d'Alençon, Duke of Alençon
15. Françoise d'Alençon
31. Marguerite de Lorraine

== Sources ==
- Bergin, Joseph (1996). The Making of the French Episcopate, 1589-1661. Yale University Press.
- Carroll, Stuart (2009). Martyrs and Murderers: The Guise Family and the Making of Europe. Oxford University Press.
- Kettering, Sharon (2008). Power and Reputation at the Court of Louis XIII: The Career of Charles d'Albert, duc de Luynes (1578-1621). Manchester University Press.
- Spangler, Jonathan (2016). The Society of Princes: The Lorraine-Guise and the Conservation of Power and Wealth in Seventeenth-Century France. Routledge.

Catholic Church titles
Preceded by Philippe du Bec	Archbishop of Reims; 1605–1621	Succeeded by Gabriel de Sainte-Marie
