= Henriette of Cleves =

French noblewoman (1542–1601)

- suo jure Duchess of Nevers suo jure Countess, then Duchess of Rethel; Princess of Mantua
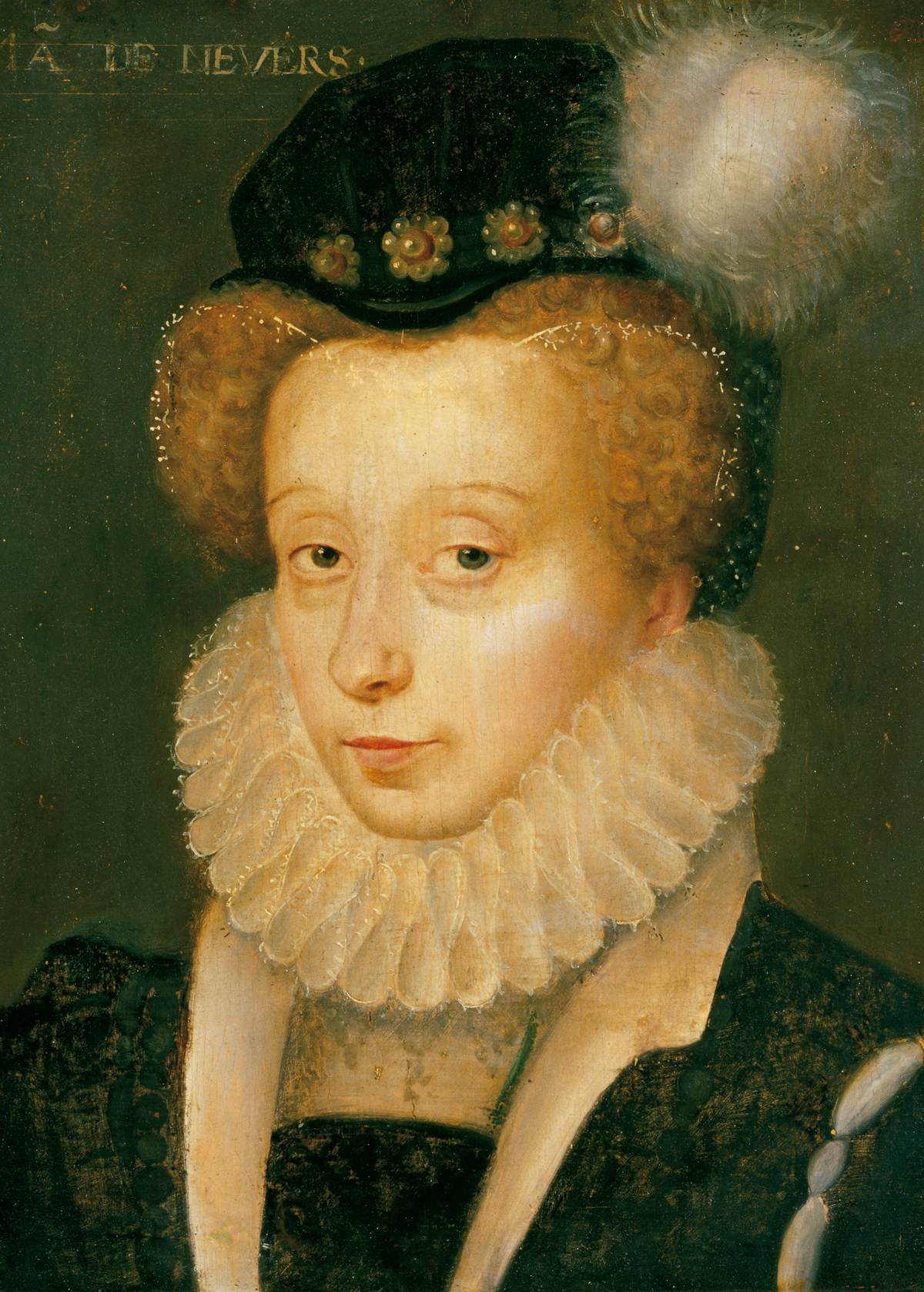
- Portrait of Henriette of Cleves painted by François Clouet on an unknown date
- Born: 31 October 1542; La Chapelle-d'Angillon, Cher, France
- Died: 24 June 1601 (aged 58); Hôtel de Nevers, Paris, France
- Buried: Nevers Cathedral
- Noble family: La Marck
- Spouse: Louis of Gonzaga
- Issue: Catherine, Duchess of Longueville; Marie Henriette, Duchess of Mayenne; Frederic Gonzaga; Francois Gonzaga; Charles I, Duke of Mantua
- Father: Francis I of Cleves, 1st Duke of Nevers, Count of Rethel
- Mother: Marguerite of Bourbon-La Marche

Henriette de La Marck (31 October 1542 – 24 June 1601), also known as Henriette of Cleves, was a member of the French high noblility, being a Duchess in her own right and courtier. She was the 4th Duchess of Nevers, suo jure Countess of Rethel, and Princess of Mantua by her marriage with Louis I of Gonzaga-Nevers. Through her marriage to Louis, she is the ancestor of many European Royals. A very talented landowner, she was one of France's chief creditors until her death, which allowed her to enlarge her personal fortune, and make her one of the richest members of the French nobility of her age.

== Early life ==
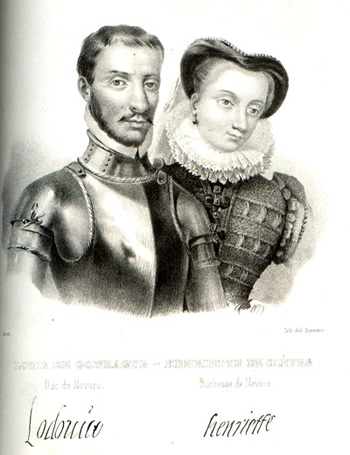
Henriette and her husband, Louis I Gonzaga.

Henriette was born in La Chapelle-d'Angillon, in the department of Cher, France, on 31 October 1542. She was the eldest daughter and second child of Francis I of Cleves, 1st Duke of Nevers, Count of Rethel, and Marguerite of Bourbon-La Marche. Her mother was the daughter of Charles, Duke of Vendôme (1489-1537) and Frances of Alençon. Dauphin Henry (future King Henry II of France) acted as her godfather at her baptism. She had many siblings, including her brothers Francis and James, her father's heirs as rulers of Nevers and Rethel, Henri (who died young), Catherine, and Marie.

Henriette soon obtained an office at court as the lady-in-waiting of Queen Catherine de' Medici. She became the intimate personal friend and confidant of Princess Marguerite. On 4 March 1565, 22-year-old Henriette married Louis I Gonzaga, Prince of Mantua in Moulins, Bourbonnais.

== Duchess of Nevers and Rethel ==
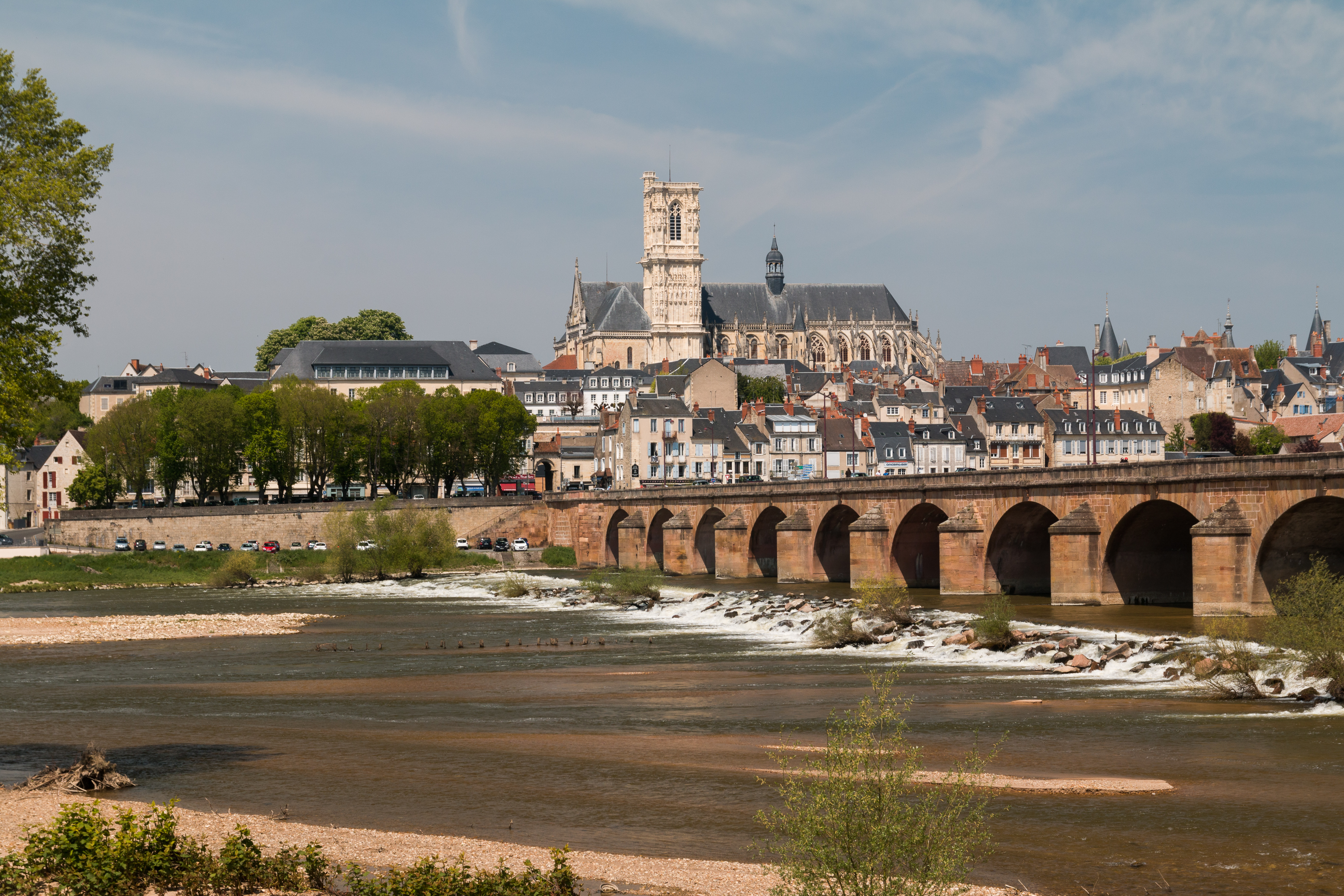
Nevers, one of the Duchies Henriette had control over.

After her eldest brother Francis had died in 1562 and brother James in 1564 without leaving heirs, Henriette became the suo jure 4th Duchess of Nevers and Countess of Rethel. She had been left with enormous debts from her late father and brothers, but managed her lands well and brought the financial situation back in order. Her profits were such that she eventually became one of the chief creditors of France's unstable state during the Wars of Religion.

Henriette died at the Hôtel de Nevers in Paris, on 24 June 1601 at the age of 58. She was buried in Nevers Cathedral at the side of her husband, who had preceded her in death in 1595.

== Issue ==
- Catherine de Nevers (21 January 1568 - 1 December 1629): Married Henry I, Duke of Longueville, by whom she had one son, Henri II d'Orléans, Duke of Longueville.
- Maria Henrietta (3 September 1571 - 3 August 1601): Married Henry of Lorraine, Duke of Mayenne.
- Frederick (11 March 1573 - 22 April 1574): Died in infancy.
- Francis (17 September 1576 - 13 June 1580): Died in childhood.
- Charles (6 May 1580- 20 September 1637): Succeeded his parents as Duke of Nevers, Rethel, Mantua, and Montferrat. Married Catherine Mayenne, daughter of Charles of Lorraine, Duke of Mayenne and Henriette of Savoy, Marquise of Villars, by whom he had six children, including Charles II Gonzaga and Anna Gonzaga.

== Rumours ==
It was rumoured that Henriette became lovers with Annibal de Coconas, a Piedmontese adventurer who was beheaded in 1574, along with Joseph Boniface de La Môle, for participating in a conspiracy against King Charles IX which was supported by the Duke of Alençon. It was alleged that she and Marguerite (now Queen of Navarre) woke up the middle of the night, removed the heads which had been placed on public display, embalmed them, and buried them in consecrated ground.

== The Nevers Foundation for Sixty Poor Girls ==
Henriette and Louis de Gonzaga, on 13 November 1573, proclaimed the establishment of their charity for poor girls in their rural domain of Nevers.

Sixty chosen poor girls, in return for promising to live ‘a good Christian life” and pray regularly for the souls of their benefactors, received a dowry of 16 écus 40 sols, a silver wedding ring and, if their intended was without employment, a job found so he could support his new wife and family.

Upon the death of Henriette in 1601, the Parlement of Paris gave administrative responsibility for the foundation to the governors of Paris’ charity hospital, the Hotel-Dieu. From the extant documents, the foundation continued into the eighteenth century, over 200 years after it was established.

== In fiction ==
- Henriette of Cleves is a character in the book La Reine Margot by Alexandre Dumas.
- Henriette of Cleves, played by Dominique Blanc, has an important role in the movie La Reine Margot.

== Ancestry ==
Ancestors of Henriette of Cleves

16. Jean I, Duc de Clèves
8. Engelbert de Clèves, Comte de Nevers
17. Elizabeth de Nevers
4. Charles II de Clèves, Count of Nevers
18. Jean VIII, Comte de Vendôme = 24
9. Charlotte de Bourbon-Vendôme
19. Isabelle de Beauvau = 25
2. François I de Clèves, Duc de Nevers
20. Arnaud Amanieu d'Albret, Seigneur d'Orval
10. Jean d'Albret, Seigneur d'Orval
21. Isabelle de La Tour d'Auvergne
5. Marie d'Albret, Comtesse de Rethel
22. Jean II, Comte de Nevers et de Rethel
11. Charlotte de Nevers, Comtesse de Rethel
23. Pauline de Bosse-Bretagne
1. Henriette of Cleves
24. Jean VIII, Comte de Vendôme = 18
12. François I, Comte de Vendôme
25. Isabelle de Beauvau = 19
6. Charles IV de Bourbon, Duc de Vendôme
26. Pierre II de Luxembourg
13. Marie de Luxembourg
27. Marguerite of Savoy
3. Marguerite de Bourbon-Vendôme
28. Jean II, Duc d'Alençon
14. René de Valois, Duc d'Alençon
29. Marie d'Armagnac
7. Françoise d'Alençon
30. Ferry II de Vaudémont
15. Marguerite de Lorraine
31. Yolande d'Anjou

== Sources ==
- Boltanski, Ariane (2006). Les ducs de Nevers et l'État royal: genèse d'un compromis (ca 1550 - ca 1600) (in French). Librairie Droz.
- Commire, Anne; Klezmer, Deborah, eds. (2000). Women in World History: Harr-I. Yorkin Publications.
- Elliott, Lisa Keane (2012). "Charitable Intent in Late Sixteenth Century France: The Nevers Foundation and Single Poor Catholic Girls". In Scott, Anne M. (ed.). Experiences of Poverty in Late Medieval and Early Modern England and France. Routledge.
- Potter, David (1993). War and Government in the French Provinces: Picardy 1470-1560. Cambridge University Press.
- Strage, Mark (1976). Women of Power: The Life and Times of Catherine de' Medici. Harcourt Brace Jovanovich. ISBN 9780151983704.

French nobility
Preceded by James of Cleves	Duchess of Nevers; 1564–1601	Succeeded by Charles I, Duke of Mantua
Preceded by James of Cleves	Duchess of La Trénches; 1564–1601	Succeeded by Charles I, Duke of Mantua
Preceded by James of Cleves	Countess of Rethel; 1564–1565	Succeeded by Title was elevated to duchy in 1565
Preceded by Title was elevated from countship	Duchess of Rethel; 1565–1601	Succeeded by Charles I, Duke of Mantua
