= François II, Duke of Nevers =

French aristocrat (1540–1562)

François II de Clèves
- Duke of Nevers; Count of Eu; Count of Rethel; Governor of Champagne
- Coat of arms of the duke of Nevers
- Born: c. 1540
- Died: 10 January 1563
- Noble family: House of La Marck
- Spouse: Anne de Bourbon-Montpensier
- Father: François I, Duke of Nevers
- Mother: Marguerite of Bourbon-La Marche

François II de Clèves, duc de Nevers et comte de Rethel (c. 1540 – 10 January 1563) was a French Prince étranger, military commander and governor of Champagne. Beginning his military career during the latter Italian Wars, he fought under François, Duke of Guise in Italy as captain of light horse.

In the reign of Charles IX, he ascended to his father's position as governor of Champagne. In this position, he initially showed favour to his co-religionists, encouraging their church services when he visited Troyes in November 1561. With the outbreak of the French Wars of Religion the following year, he confirmed this attitude with a promise of support to the leader of the rebels, Condé. However, after this point he would retreat from his support of the Protestant cause.

When the Protestants of Troyes, one of the primary cities of his governate, attempted a coup in favour of Condé in April 1562, Nevers travelled to the city, urging the Protestants to withdraw from the gates they had seized and disarm. In the following months, he sought to chart a middle path, encouraging Catholics and Protestants to share control of the city government and militia. However, when he withdrew from the town, he left it under the authority of his subordinate Bordes who began persecuting the towns Protestants. Nevers, increasingly uninterested, supported Bordes in his brutal capture of the town of Bar-sur-Seine which had been taken by Protestant rebels. After this, he seized a château near Reims that had been taken by Protestants, executing the garrison. In December, now with the royal army in Normandy, he fought for the crown at the Battle of Dreux where he was fatally wounded, dying several weeks later.

== Early life and family ==
François II de Clèves duke of Nevers was born in 1540, the son of François I de Clèves and Marguerite de Bourbon-La Marche. His family held a strategic position between the Aisne and the Meuse, with his families main seat of residence at Rethel. To ensure the families success in the region François I established marital alliances with the other leading princely families of the region. François II's sister Catherine de Clèves was married to the sovereign prince of Porcien, Antoine III de Croÿ a leading Protestant militant. His brother Jacques de Clèves married the daughter of Bouillon, another Protestant sovereign prince.

François married Anne de Bourbon-Montpensier in September 1561, with whom he would have no children before his death.

== Reign of Henri II ==
Nevers began his career serving as a captain of light horse under Guise, fighting in Italy in 1555. In 1557, Nevers was with Guise in Italy again, as Guise campaigned against the duke of Alba in the Papal States.

== Reign of François II ==
With the death of Henri II, the new regime, led by the Guise was faced with sources of potential opposition. The most prominent of these was the ambitious Condé, who chafed at their leadership. To remove him as a challenger, the Guise first floated the idea of him receiving Coligny's governorship of Picardy. They then moved to extricate him from the court while they consolidated, instructing him to present the signed peace of Cateau-Cambrésis to Philip II of Spain. After hesitating to accept this removal from court, Condé eventually obliged them in August. Nevers and one of his brothers accompanied him on his mission to Ghent to ensure he performed his task correctly.

== Reign of Charles IX ==
=== Succession ===
In August 1561 Nevers succeeded his dying father as governor of Champagne. He was viewed with great hope by both the Protestants and Catholics of Champagne, many of whom felt he would be a strong friend of their religion. In November he confirmed the Protestants hopes visiting Troyes and encouraging the Protestant community of the town to hold open services.

=== Condé ===
In April 1562 as the first war of religion got underway, Nevers was approached by Condé, his uncle, who asked him to draw up funds and troops from Champagne to support the capture of Orléans. Nevers verbally assured him of his support and dutifully passed this request onto the towns of Champagne.

=== Troyes ===
In Troyes the Catholic notable Esclavolles engineered the election of Catholic échevins, excluding Huguenot candidates from the vote. The Protestants of the town, outraged sent petitions to Paris, to inform Nevers that Esclavolles was usurping his rightful authority in the city. Shortly thereafter the Protestants of the city seized two of the gates in a partial coup of the town. Nevers made his way to the town, arriving on 21 April, entering after he had talked the Protestant militants into putting down their arms, promising they would not be harmed.

Nevers was not as enthusiastic to support Condé's cause as the Protestants of Troyes had hoped, preferring instead a police of neutrality. When his subordinate Bordes tried to pursue a group of Protestant soldiers who were travelling off to Condé's army, Nevers called him off from the chase. Nevers favoured a joint Catholic and Protestant control of the gates of the town, he also prohibited the possession of weapons, ordering judges to disarm the populace. These policy moves made the Protestants nervous, concerned the Catholic judiciary would un-evenly enforce the prohibition however Nevers reassured them that no harm would come. The searches revealed a large stash of weapons held by the Protestants of the town, Nevers was frustrated and wrote to the king saying he wished the leading Protestants of the town would leave but would not force them to go.

Nevers opined that the town would benefit from a council comprised equally of both religions, and further pushed the town to raise a defensive company which the urban administration resisted, unwilling to shoulder the expense. At this time Porcien was active in Champagne with a Protestant force, and menaced the towns of Troyes and Châlons, but did not conduct an assault on either. In July Nevers withdrew from Troyes, as it underwent a bout of plague and left his militant Catholic subordinate Bordes in charge of the town. The situation for Protestants in Troyes rapidly declined as they were excluded from the militia, political office and then subject to violent harassment. Representatives of the community went to complain to Nevers but he trusted his subordinate was being misrepresented. In late August Bordes attacked the town of Bar-sur-Seine, which had been taken over in a Protestant coup, on Nevers' orders. He massacred the Protestants of the town killing over 100 after he had control of the town. Involved in the assault was Nevers' gendarmerie company.

=== Campaigning and death ===
On 23 September, Nevers led a force of 1600 men against a Protestant held château near Reims. Having successfully drawn the garrison out with a ruse, he had them executed.

As the two sides drew up in front of each other at the field of Dreux, Nevers faced down his co-religionists from the royal camp. In the battle that followed, he would be wounded, dying of his wounds on 10 January.

== Sources ==
- Boltanski, Ariane (2006). Les ducs de Nevers et l'État royal: genèse d'un compromis (ca 1550 - ca 1600) (in French). Librairie Droz. ISBN 9782600010221.
- Carroll, Stuart (2013). "'Nager entre deux eaux': The Princes and the Ambiguities of French Protestantism". Sixteenth Century Journal. 44 (4): 985–1020. JSTOR 24246299.
- Carroll, Stuart (2009). Martyrs and Murderers: The Guise Family and the Making of Europe. Oxford University Press. IA.
- Durot, Éric (2012). François de Lorraine, duc de Guise entre Dieu et le Roi. Classiques Garnier. ISBN 9782812406102.
- Harding, Robert (1978). Anatomy of a Power Elite: the Provincial Governors in Early Modern France. Yale University Press. IA.
- Roberts, Penny (1996). A City in Conflict: Troyes during the French Wars of Religion. Manchester University Press. IA.
