= Nevers Cathedral =

Cathedral located in Nièvre, France

- Cathédrale Saint-Cyr-et-Sainte-Julitte de Nevers
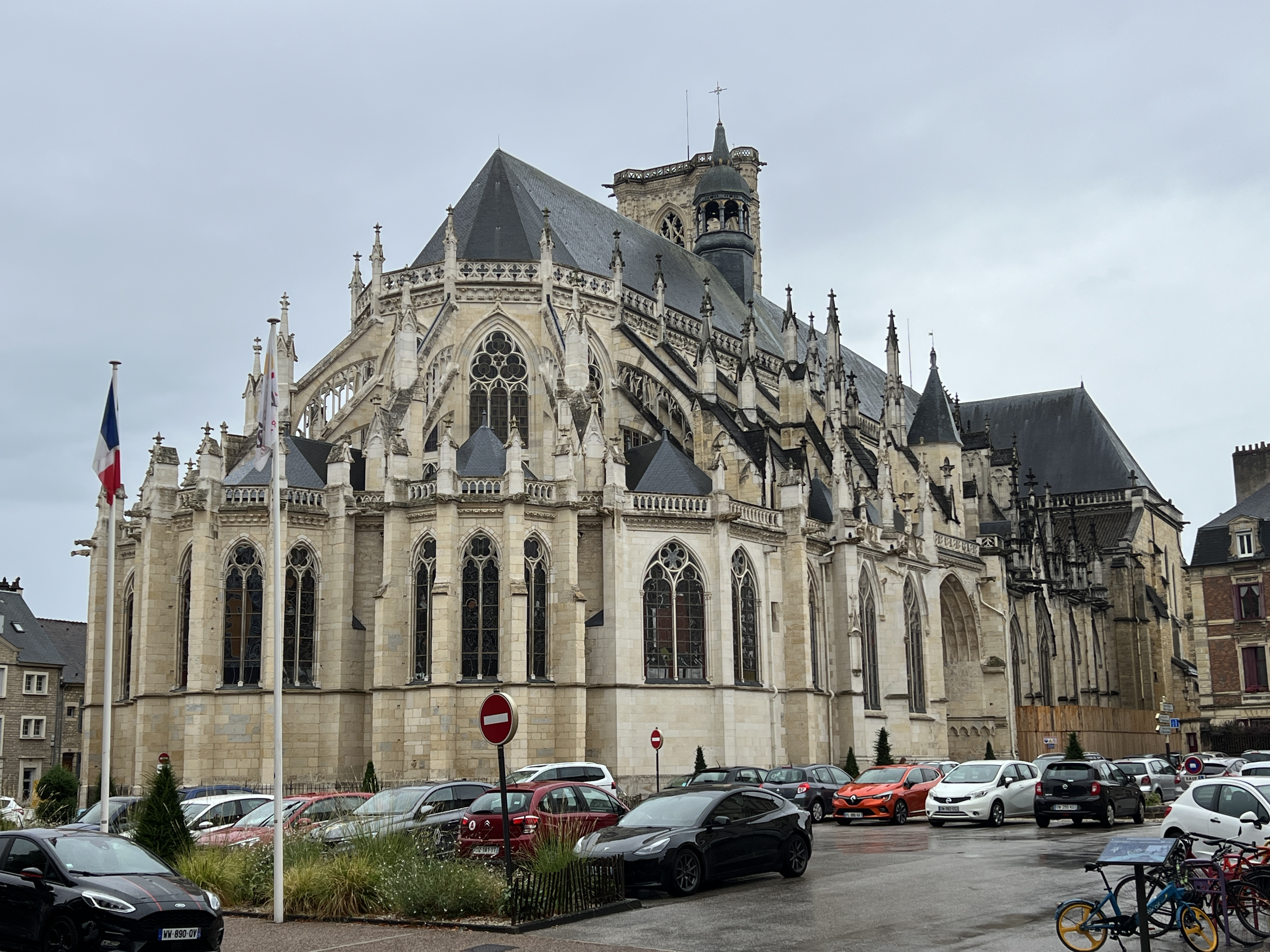

Religion
- Affiliation: Catholic Church
- Province: Dijon
- Region: Nièvre
- Rite: Roman Rite
- Ecclesiastical or organisational status: Cathedral

Location
- Location: Nevers, France
- Interactive map of Nevers Cathedral
- Coordinates: 46°59′14″N 3°9′26″E

Architecture
- Type: Church
- Style: Romanesque, Gothic

Website
- Official website (in French)

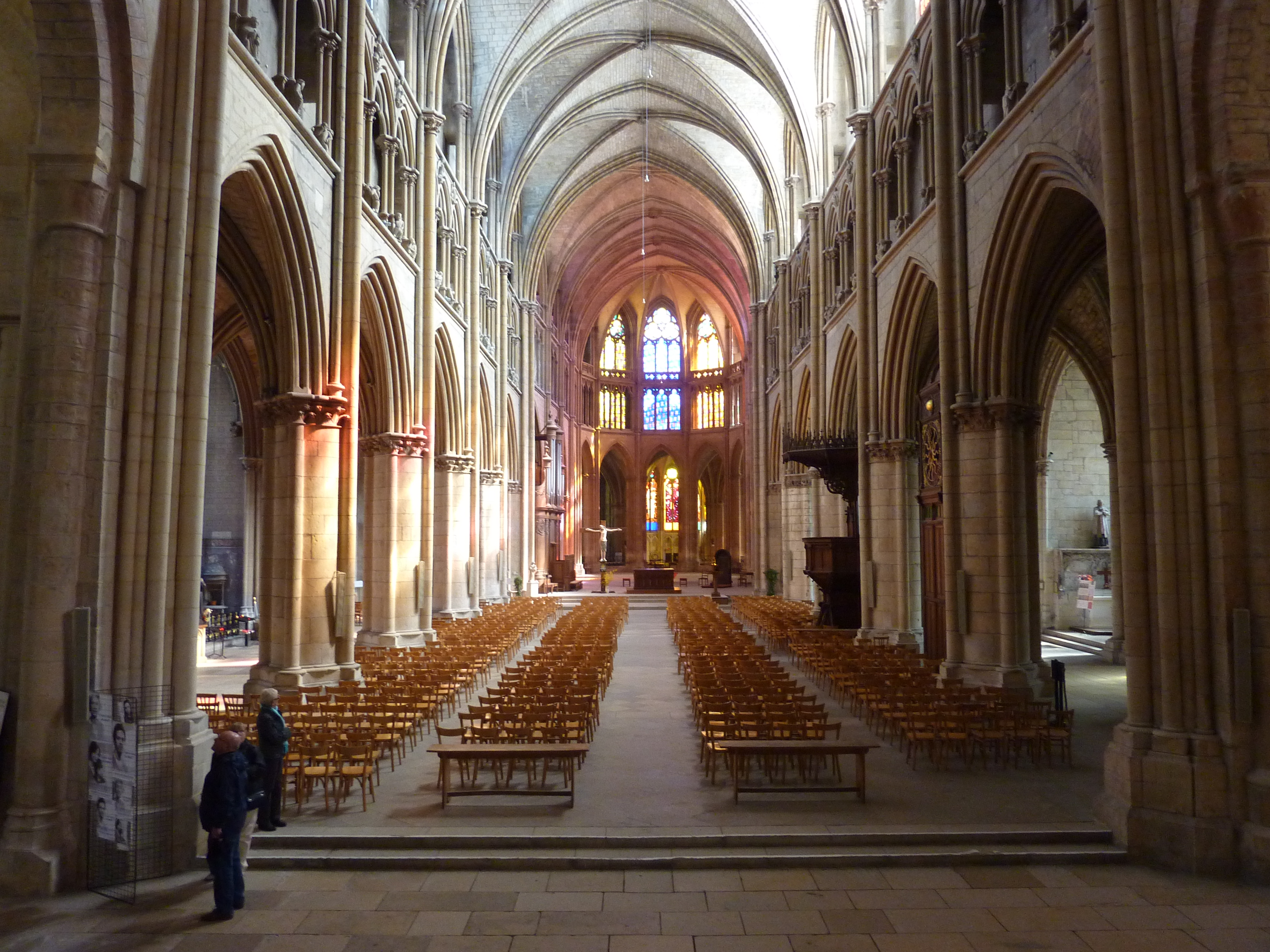
View of the interior

Nevers Cathedral (French: Cathédrale Saint-Cyr-et-Sainte-Julitte de Nevers) is a Roman Catholic church located in the town of Nevers, Nièvre, France, and dedicated to Saints Cyricus and Julitta. The cathedral is the seat of the Bishop of Nevers. It is a national monument. The cathedral was designated a basilica in the mid-19th century and as a Monument Historique in 1862.

== History ==
The origins of the cathedral date as early as the Roman period. The remains of a Gallo-Roman temple dedicated to Janus were discovered around 1904 at the foot of the building.

The diocese was established in Nevers in 517, with the construction of the first building dedicated to Saints Gervais and Protais. At that time, the city's footprint remained limited, and the building's orientation would have placed the entrance opposite the political center, on the side facing the ramparts. The building's chancel also faced west due to the need to establish a presence on the pagan site without turning its back on the city.

By the end of the 8th century, the building was in very poor condition. With funding from Charlemagne, reconstruction of a second cathedral started in 1068 and was completed by the end of the 13th century with consecration in 1097. Unlike the smaller former building, the new church was constructed in a Carolingian style, with a flat wooden roof, a transept, and two towers that flanked the eastern facades of the transept, to the north and south. The relics of Saint Cyr and his mother, Saint Julitta, were brought to Nevers in two stages during this period, and the church was consecrated in 1097.

After a fire in 1211 destroyed large portions of the cathedral, Bishop Guillaume de Saint-Lazare rebuilt it in the Gothic style. The new building featured a three-story elevation with large arcades, a blind triforium, and tall bays. while the Romanesque choir and transept were preserved. The cathedral was also rebuilt facing east because of the expansion of the city allowing for a greater structural footprint. Following two fires in 1228 and 1308, the cathedral was completely rebuilt in a Rayonnant Gothic style, with a new choir elaborate window panels, and an open triforium. Peter Paludanus consecrated the cathedral in 1330. Construction of a tower on the south side of the nave began at the start of the 14th century, but plans for a west facade and additional tower were abandoned due to a lack of additional funding. During this time, Nevers also became one of the pilgrimage sites on route to Santiago de Compostela. Construction continued steadily into the 15th century, with radiating chapels being built within the Gothic choir and the installation of an organ. Around the same time, work resumed on the reconstruction of the south tower. Partially reclad with dressed stone in its lower section during the 14th century, the work was restarted under the episcopate of Jean Bohier and completed in 1528 under Jean III of Navarre. The north tower, lowered and simply covered with a section of terracotta tiles, now blends into the silhouette of the building.

In the second half of the 18th century, Jean-Antoine Tinseau, Bishop of Nevers, launched a major restoration campaign. The building, previously covered with flat Burgundy tiles, was reroofed with fine slate and rebuilt in a Louis XV style. A bell tower with a lead arch and slate dome was added to the nave roof, connecting it to the clockwork figure in the choir. New additions to the interior included the installation of a fine chancel screen and the removal of the old rood screen. The cathedral suffered from vandalism during the French Revolution, with the destruction of some of the portals and statues. By order, the tombs that had previously been located in the nave were demolished, and the cathedral was turned into a Temple of Reason. Despite these changes, the cathedral was erected as a minor basilica by Pope Pius IX in 1868.

In the first half of the 20th century were devoted to the continuation of the restoration work. Significant achievements included the removal of the old stone paving on the cathedral, a complete repair of the gutter balustrades, replacement of the pinnacles, and restoration of the flying buttresses. Abbé-Boutillier Street was built in 1904, south of the cathedral, destroying the old refectory and the medieval chapter house, half of an 18th-century building, and the 16th-century chapel on the Romanesque apse side. An English courtyard was excavated at the foot of the Romanesque choir to create large windows to illuminate the crypt. A marble mosaic created by the Favret workshop in Nevers, was installed in the choir, and the bell tower roof was replaced around 1910.

The cathedral suffered severe damage during World War II, when Allied bombs accidentally struck the old town center of Nevers instead of the railway depots they had originally targeted. Two bombs fell on the Gothic choir, destroying the gothic vaulting, organ, and most of the stained-glass windows. Postwar reconstruction work, primarily focused on the structural elements, took place between 1946 and 1966. The building was rebuilt exactly as it had been, and restoration of the furnishings and the creation of new stained-glass windows continue to this day.

== Architecture ==
After the building suffered a series of fires in the 13th century, the Gothic nave and eastern apse were added to the still standing Romanesque parts. There is no transept at the eastern end. The lateral portal on the south side belongs to the late 15th century; the massive and elaborately decorated Bohier tower which rises beside it to the early 16th century. The gothic nave and chevet were seriously damaged by a Royal Air Force bombing in the night of 15–16 July 1944 but later restored.

The cathedral preserves a polychrome oak triumphal cross dating from about 1200. The cross bears a Christus carved in walnut. At each end are medallions with symbols representing the four evangelists.

== Burials ==
- Yolande II, Countess of Nevers
- Henriette of Cleves

== See also ==
- List of Gothic Cathedrals in Europe
