= François I, Duke of Nevers =

French Prince étranger and military commander

François I de Clèves
- Duke of Nevers; Count of Eu; Count of Rethel
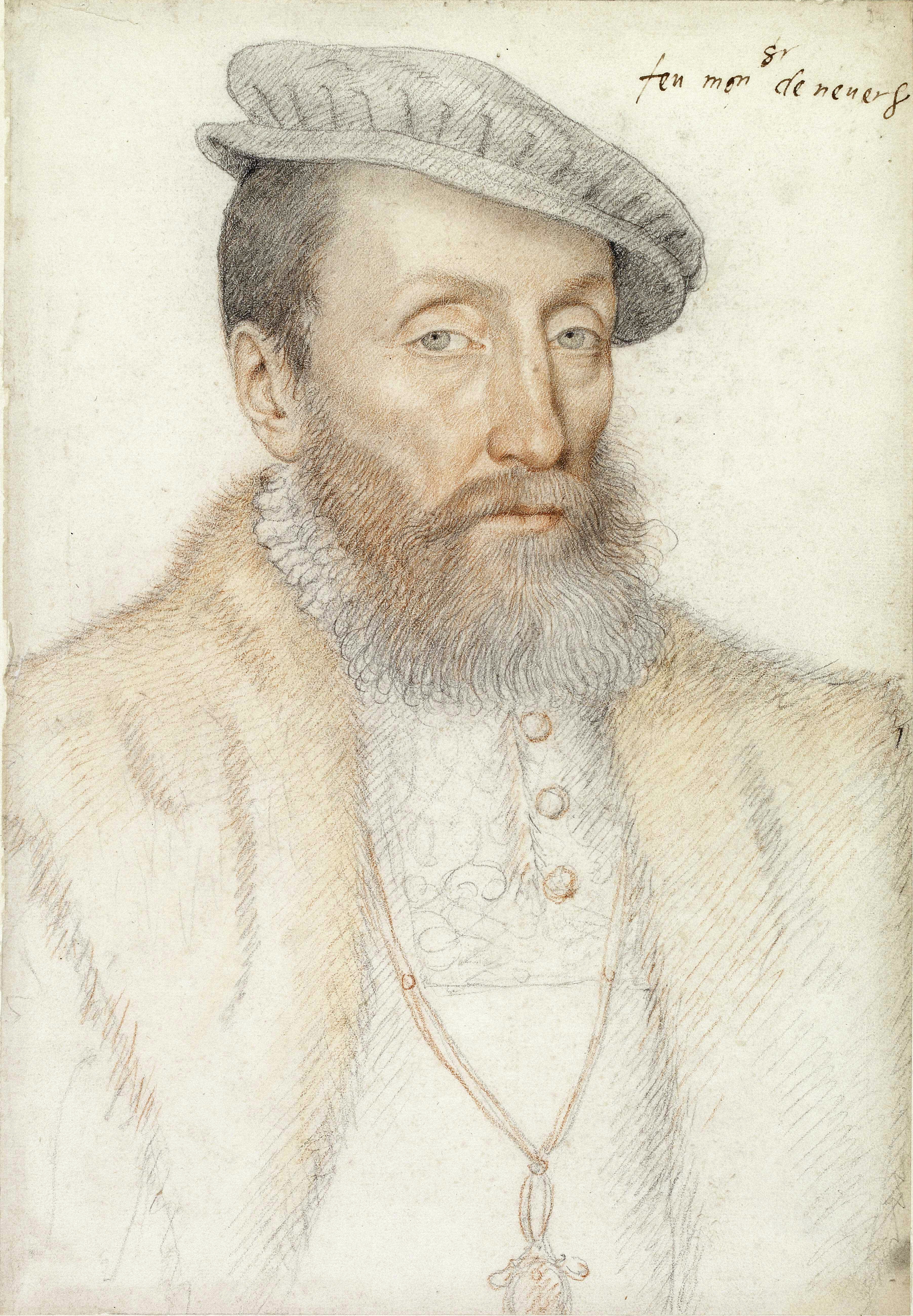
- François I de Clèves, Duke of Nevers (by François Clouet)
- Born: 2 September 1516
- Died: 13 February 1561 (aged 44)
- Noble family: La Marck
- Spouses: Marguerite of Bourbon-Vendôme; Marie of Bourbon-Saint-Pol
- Issue: François II, Duke of Nevers; Henriette, Duchess of Nevers; Jacques, Duke of Nevers; Catherine of Cleves; Marie of Cleves
- Father: Charles II, Count of Nevers
- Mother: Marie d'Albret, Countess of Rethel

François I de Clèves (2 September 1516 – 13 February 1561) was a French Prince étranger and military commander during the Italian Wars. He was the first duke of Nevers, his county being elevated to a duchy in 1539. In deference to the large amount of land he held in Champagne, and lands he was set to inherit there from his mother, François was made governor of Champagne in 1545.

Upon the ascent of Henri II to the throne of France, François would involve himself deeply in the king's ambitions for resuming the Italian Wars. He fought at the decisive victory of the siege of Metz in 1552. In 1554 he was granted the honour of leading one of the three royal armies that invaded Artois, and in the following campaign was with François, Duke of Guise's small force when it won a surprising victory against the main imperial army under Charles V, Holy Roman Emperor. He assisted in the salvage of French forces after the disaster at Saint-Quentin and assisted in the successful defence of Thionville against the victorious Spanish army the following year.

Upon the death of Henri II, François attempted to control the Protestants of his governorship, who were growing increasingly bold, but was unable to do much to slow the growth of their community. Increasingly ill, he died the following year, resigning his governorship in favour of his son on his deathbed. Throughout his career François had attempted to tie his children into the leading princely families of the northern frontier, who were largely Protestant, those of La Marck and Croÿ. His son, François, would only outlive him by a year, and upon his death his second son Jacques would die in 1564, extinguishing the male line of his house, leading to the duchy of Nevers being inherited by Louis Gonzaga through marriage to his daughter.

== Early life and family ==
The only son of Charles II of Nevers (d. 1521) and Marie d'Albret, Countess of Rethel, François succeeded his father as Count of Nevers and Eu.

In 1538, Nevers married Marguerite of Bourbon-Vendôme (1516–1589), daughter of Charles de Bourbon, Duke of Vendôme and Françoise of Alençon. He received 100,000 livres from her dowry and a further 20,000 as a royal gift to celebrate the event.

They had:

- François II, Duke of Nevers (1540–1563), 2nd Duke; married Anne de Bourbon, daughter of Louis, Duke of Montpensier, no issue.
- Henriette of Cleves (1542–1601); married Louis Gonzaga, Duke of Nevers, and became 4th Duchess of Nevers after the death of her brothers.
- Jacques, Duke of Nevers (1544–1564), 3rd Duke, married Diane de la Marck
- Catherine of Cleves (1548–1633); married Antoine III de Croÿ and Henry I, Duke of Guise.
- Marie of Cleves (1553–1574); married Henri I de Bourbon, prince de Condé.

In 1560 Nevers remarried in an elaborate double wedding, occurring simultaneously to that of his daughter with Porcien. The event was hosted at the royal château of Saint-Germain-en-Laye with the attendance of all the French princes except the Bourbon-Vendôme.

== Reign of François I ==
In 1539, his county was elevated and he became Duke of Nevers.

== Reign of Henri II ==
In 1545 Nevers was named governor of Champagne. When his mother died in 1549, he inherited the title of comte de Rethel et Beaufort, vicomté de Saint Florentin, baron de Evry le Chastel. These acquisitions further cemented his landed interests in Champagne. At this time the combined worth of all the titles he held was at least 2 million livres.

He spent little time in his governorship, most of the following years consumed fighting the Italian Wars. In 1552 he fought at the defence of Metz.

In the 1554 campaign season he led one of the three armies Henri sent into Artois, the forces devastated the region and captured several fortress. In July the armies reunited and he was with a small shadowing force of 2000 under François, Duke of Guise when they stumbled upon the main imperial army. Utilising the forest for cover the small force was able to deliver a shocking victory over Charles V at Renty, however the main royal force was unable to decide how to exploit their victory for a more decisive result.

After the disaster at the battle of Saint-Quentin, Nevers was among those commanders able to lead the remnants of the French army to safety, preserving some of their forces. He assisted in the successful defence of Thionville that followed.

In 1557 several Protestant pastors wrote to the Swiss cantons urging them to intercede on behalf of those who had been arrested after the rue Saint-Jacques affair. The pastors told the Swiss that if the council wrote to the court, there were several influential nobles who would support the arrested worshippers, among them Nevers.

At the peace celebrations for the end of the Italian Wars, Nevers was among the nobles jousting with the king, before the king would find himself accidentally killed by another of his jousting opponents.

== Reign of François II ==
As the Protestants grew in confidence in France in the late 1550s they began to assert themselves inside Nevers' governorship. In Troyes some Protestants attacked a statue of the virgin Mary. In response a procession of absolution was organised by the local Catholic community. However the procession would disperse when they heard that Huguenot artisans were lying in wait to ambush them. Nevers would prohibit further attempted processions arguing that it was not safe for them to be conducted.

== Reign of Charles IX ==
On his deathbed in 1561, Nevers would be granted the privilege to resign his governorship of Champagne directly to his son. Only once in the years 1494-1547 had a major governor been granted the permission to resign their governorship in favour of a specific candidate of their choosing.

His many campaigns, upon which he had spent a large part of his fortune meant that his son would be forced to declare bankruptcy shortly after inheriting his fathers titles, unable to meet the interest payments on the loans his father had taken out to fund his troops.

== Sources ==
- Antonetti, Guy (2000). "Les Princes Etrangers". In Bardet, Jean-Pierre (ed.). Etat et société en France aux XVIIe et XVIIIe siècles (in French). Presses l'Universite de Paris-Sorbonne.
- Baumgartner, Frederic (1988). Henry II: King of France 1547-1559. Duke University Press.
- Boltanski, Ariane (2006). Les ducs de Nevers et l'État royal: genèse d'un compromis (ca 1550 - ca 1600) (in French). Librairie Droz.
- Carroll, Stuart (2009). Martyrs and Murderers: The Guise Family and the Making of Europe. Oxford University Press.
- Harding, Robert (1978). Anatomy of a Power Elite: the Provincial Governors in Early Modern France. Yale University Press.
- Knecht, Robert (1998). Catherine de' Medici. Routledge.
- Potter, David (1990). "Marriage and Cruelty among the Protestant Nobility in Sixteenth-Century France: Diane de Barbançon and Jean de Rohan, 1561-7". European History Quarterly. 20 (January 1): 5–38. doi:10.1177/026569149002000101. S2CID 144245625.
- Potter, David (1995). Keen, Maurice (ed.). A History of France, 1460–1560: The Emergence of a Nation State. Macmillan.
- Roberts, Penny (1996). A City in Conflict: Troyes during the French Wars of Religion. Manchester University Press.

coat-of-arms of Nevers

François I, Duke of Nevers House of La Marck Born: 2 September 1516 Died: 1 February 1561
Preceded by Charles II	Count of Nevers; 1521–1539	Succeeded by raised to Duchy
Preceded by County of Nevers	Duke of Nevers; 1539–1561	Succeeded by François II (1561–1563); Jacques (1563–1564); Henriette of Cleves (1564–1601)
