= Louis de Gonzague, Duke of Nevers =

Italian-French soldier, governor and statesman (1539–1595)

Louis de Gonzague
- jure uxoris Duke of Nevers
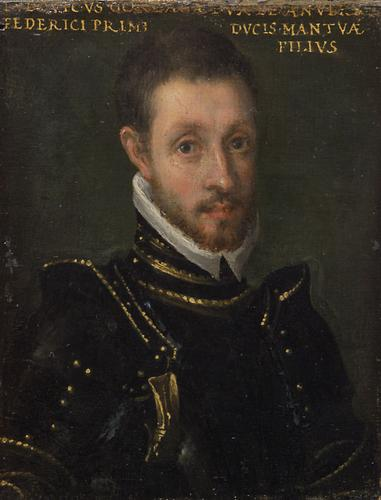
- Anonymous portrait of the duke
- Born: 18 September 1539; Mantua
- Died: 23 October 1595 (aged 56); Nesle
- Noble family: House of Gonzaga
- Spouse: Henriette de Clèves
- Issue: Catherine, Duchess of Longueville; Marie Henriette, Duchess of Mayenne; Frederic Gonzague; François Gonzague; Charles I, Duke of Mantua
- Father: Federico II Gonzaga
- Mother: Margaret Palaeologina

Louis de Gonzague, Duke of Nevers (Italian: Ludovico or Luigi di Gonzaga-Nevers; 18 September 1539 – 23 October 1595) was a soldier, governor and statesman during the French Wars of Religion. His father and brother were reigning dukes of Mantua. He came to France in 1549, and fought for Henri II of France during the latter Italian Wars, getting himself captured during the battle of Saint Quentin. Due to his Italian connections he was seen as a useful figure to have as governor of French Piedmont, a post he would hold until Henri III ceded the territory in 1574. In 1565 his patron, Catherine de' Medici secured for him a marriage with the key heiress Henriette de Clèves, elevating him to duke of Nevers and count of Rethel. He fought for the crown through the early wars of religion, receiving a bad injury in the third war. At this time he formed a close bond with the young Anjou, future king Henri III, a bond that would last until the king's death.

He opposed any drive to war with Spain in 1572, and after the attempt on Admiral Coligny's life was a key member of the council that decided on the policy of elimination for the Protestant leadership. A radical Catholic, he revelled in his involvement in the Massacre that unfolded in the subsequent days. In the fourth war of religion he was the de facto leader of the siege of La Rochelle but was unable to bring it success. In the fifth civil war his army shadowed that of the duke of Alençon brother of the new king Henri, not giving battle, but containing him until Catherine negotiated a settlement. Nevers was disgusted with the generous Peace of Monsieur that concluded the civil war, joining the ligue movement that spread in the wake of it among radical Catholics, and campaigning for the resumption of war which was soon achieved. He now acted in the sixth civil war as the de facto leader of Alençon's now loyal army, campaigning brutally along the Loire, sacking La Charité-sur-Loire and Issoire, the war concluding in the harsher Treaty of Bergerac.

Nevers was again tempted to join the ligue during the second wave of the movement after the death of Alençon. Briefly serving as a commander for their forces in 1584, before he was pealed off from the movement in 1585 and returned to loyally supporting Henri. In 1588 he was chosen to replace the Prince of Condé as governor of Picardie. He would try and fail to receive the submission of several ligue towns in the governate for the king. In 1589 he would be replaced in the governate, and granted the role of governor of Champagne instead, a role he held in the name of his son. After the assassination of the Duke of Guise he was courted by the insurgent ligueurs in Paris who wanted to bring him over to the cause, but he rebuffed their advances. He virulently urged the king in the chaos that followed, not to come to terms with his heir Navarre but the king refused his advice, and formed an alliance, despite this Nevers remained loyal. On the death of the king, he again flirted with the ligue before committing himself to Henri IV serving him in Champagne, and then in failed diplomatic negotiations with the Pope after his abjuration from Protestantism. After briefly serving on his financial council, he died in 1595.

== Early life and family ==
Born in Mantua in 1539, he was the third child of Frederick II Gonzaga, Duke of Mantua, and Margaret Palaeologina. His brother Guglielmo became the duke of Mantua. At the age of 10 he was sent to Paris to inherit the assets left by his grandmother, Anne d'Alençon, widow of Marquess Gugiliemo IX of Montferrat.

=== Marriage ===
On 4 March 1565 Nevers was married to the heiress Henriette de Clèves who brought with her to the marriage the Nivernais and the county of Rethel. Catherine de Medici had helped engineer this marriage for her favourite. As such Louis de Gonzague became duke of Nevers jure uxoris. This was due to the extinction of the male line with the death of Jacques de Clèves, Duke of Nevers the previous year. Nevers was supported in his militant Catholicism by his wife, who shared his proclivities for uncompromising Catholicism. Henriette's sisters would marry Henri I, Duke of Guise, another leader militant Catholic, and Henri, Prince of Condé, who would be one of the leader Protestant rebels in the later wars of religion.

=== Children ===
His first son held the title of comte de Rethel during his lifetime. Their son Charles became duke of Mantua in 1627, establishing the Gonzaga-Nevers line. Charles' grandson, Charles II, Duke of Mantua and Montferrat, sold the titles of Nevers and Rethel to Cardinal Mazarin in 1659.

Louis, Duke of Nevers, and his wife had five children:

- Catherine Gonzaga (21 January 1568 – 1 December 1629), married Henry I, Duke of Longueville
- Maria Henrietta Gonzaga (3 September 1571 – 3 August 1614), married Henry of Lorraine, Duke of Mayenne
- Frederick Gonzaga (11 March 1573 – 22 April 1574).
- Francis Gonzaga (17 September 1576 – 13 June 1580).
- Charles I, Duke of Mantua (6 May 1580 – 20 September 1637).

== Reign of Henri II ==
In 1549, Nevers emigrated from Italy, setting himself up in the court of the recently crowned Henri II. He fought with Henri in the latter Italian Wars, and was one of the many high nobles captured after the disastrous battle of Saint-Quentin in 1557.

The Peace of Cateau-Cambrésis that brought the Italian Wars to a close featured a joust as part of the celebrations. Henri decided to compete as was his habit, however his joust against Gabriel de Lorges, Count of Montgomery went awry, and he received a large shard of wood into his eye. Nevers who was present reported on what had happened to his Italian compatriots.

== Reign of François II ==
As an important Prince étranger, Nevers was among the notables called to attend the Assembly of Notables in 1560, the assembly brought together by the Guise government in response to the financial and religious crisis that had recently been laid bare by the Conspiracy of Amboise in which malcontents tried to overthrow their government and kidnap the king. This assembly concluded that an Estates General was necessary to meet France's financial problems, one would meet later that year and that a general religious council was needed to resolve the problem of Protestantism.

== Reign of Charles IX ==
By the mid-1560s, Nevers had received the position of lieutenant-general of the Piedmont, responsible for the military security of the remaining French possessions in Italy. He would maintain his hold on this strategic post into the 1570s.

In the peace that followed the first war of religion, there was not much opportunity for promotion within the companies under Nevers command, however that changed with the return of war, with 12 promotions within his units in October 1567 alone.

=== Second war of religion ===
At the start of the second war of religion, negotiations flew back and forth between the Prince of Condé and the crown as Catherine de Medici tried to persuade him to call off his rebellion. One of the terms Condé demanded for laying down his arms was a removal of all 'Italians' from court, by which he meant Nevers, Albert de Gondi, Jacques de Savoie, duke of Nemours. This would become a common demand of rebels during the French Wars of Religion, with the king's brother Alençon demanding similarly when he joined the Malcontents in 1575. Condé, who had been besieging Paris, was dislodged after the battle of Saint Denis and began moving east, hoping to link up with an army of German reiters. The royal army after some delay pursued him from Paris, while Nevers brought a separate army up from the south, exiting his governorship in Piedmont, and marching through Burgundy, gathering more forces in Lyon including a contingent of Swiss to join in the hunt for the battered prince's army before it could escape. En route he captured the town of Mâcon which had gone over to the rebels at the start of the war. They would be unsuccessful in this hunt and Condé slipped over the frontier into the Empire. In January the secondary armies of Nevers and Claude, Duke of Aumale would link up with the main royal body at Vitry-le-François, exhausted after the pursuit of the Protestant force. With the return of the rebel army, it was agreed that the army would split up to pursue it, with Anjou taking the main body again to shadow them from the north, while Nevers harassed them from the south. The Protestant army marched on Chartres and put the city to siege, while the royal forces found themselves racked with illness, and lack of pay, forcing them to return to Paris and allow the Protestant siege. Before the siege could conclude, a peace settlement would be reached Nevers had spent March urging Anjou not to depart from Paris to confront the Protestants until such time as their German reiters arrived, which Nevers felt was critical to victory, however they would not do so until peace had been declared.

During the third war that followed in 1568, Nevers would receive a serious leg wound, which compromised his ability to lead a military life, pushing him more into the role of statesman going forward, though he would continue to hold commands.

=== Friendship ===
He took the young Anjou brother of the king under his wing after 1568, acting as his intellectual and political adviser, warning him away from closeness with the Guise, telling Anjou that their family was the principal cause of the crowns current weakness. His continued hostility to the Guise, who he disparaged both for their great power over the state and due to their somewhat deficient learning, in particular that of Louis II, Cardinal of Guise, came despite the fact that Henri I, Duke of Guise was, by 1570, his brother in law, with both men married to daughters of François I, Duke of Nevers.

=== Peace ===
In 1571, with the Admiral de Coligny pushing hard for a war with Spain to 're-unite Catholic and Protestant behind the crown' Nevers found himself in virulent opposition on council to such a scheme. He was not alone in opposition, all other members of the council bar Coligny were uninterested in such a venture and informed the king they opposed it. Nevers however had his intellectual protégé Anjou to make his case for him. His opposition came not only on grounds of principal, disliking the thought of declaring war on a Catholic monarch in favour of a Protestant adviser to the king, but also strategic, feeling that France would be fatally compromised when Spanish forces attacked from their Italian holdings. He did not leave himself at this however, and alongside having Anjou argue his position, he was among those leading councillors who prepared memoranda highlighting the dangers of a war with Spain.

In 1572 Nevers purchased from Charles IX, the Grand Nesle, an old townhouse located just east of the Tour de Nesle on the Left Bank of Paris. Nevers had it reconstructed, after which it became known as the Hôtel de Nevers. Although it was never completed, it was greatly admired by contemporaries. Nevers' secretary, Blaise de Vigenère, a distinguished antiquarian and art historian, wrote that the house had a vault, built by Italian workmen, which was more grand than the one at the Baths of Caracalla. Although De Vigenère likely overstated the size, it must have been very impressive and was an architectural feature that was new to Paris.

=== Radical ===
In August 1572, shortly before the upcoming royal marriage, a smaller marriage was held between the Prince of Condé and Marie de Clèves, the sister of Nevers' wife. Condé and Clèves were first cousins, and as such their marriage would require Papal dispensation to go ahead, both were Protestant however, and as such no dispensation was going to be forthcoming. The king gave his assent to the marriage, and it was decided that this would be sufficient without the dispensation. The leading Catholics of the court reacted in disgust to this, with the Cardinal de Bourbon accosting his nephew asking him how he dared marry a Protestant, and without Papal dispensation. Condé replied the only dispensation he required was that of the king, causing Bourbon to leave in disgust. Louis, Duke of Montpensier spoke dark words to the king himself before joining the cardinal in storming out. He was followed by the two brothers in law of the bride, Henri I, Duke of Guise and Nevers, neither of whom had any stomach for this arrangement on religious grounds.

=== Wedding ===
During the celebrations for the wedding of Navarre to the king's sister Marguerite de Valois, Coligny was non-fatally shot while walking home from the Louvre. Nevers was among the many candidates accused by the ambassadors present in Paris of involvement in the attempted hit. The court was immediately plunged into crisis as the already tense capital became a powder keg, with a real prospect of civil war resuming, and Coligny's Protestant followers in the city threatening revenge on the killer. Rumours swirled that Nevers, Guise and other leading Catholics would be revenged upon for their alleged involvement in the attack. On 23 August, Catherine assembled a meeting of her close advisers, among them Nevers, Gondi and Tavannes, the group agreed that crisis could be averted with a targeted strike to eliminate the main Protestant leadership. For Nevers it was not a matter of religion, but rather concerns over the ambitions of Coligny that drove him towards this policy. The targeted strike would not however proceed as planned, and shortly the whole of Paris was in the throws of a Massacre, Nevers reacted to this turn of events with glee, interpreting it as gods will that the situation would develop this way, he described the days of the massacre, in which thousands died, as a spiritual experience in which he came closer to god. The king was not pleased with this development however, and Nevers and Henri d'Angoulême both of whom had been heavily involved in the killings were called to the Louvre and sent out with orders to get the killings to stop on the morning of 24 August. He would be a poor ambassador for this message, the units under his command and those of Anjou, which had originally been tasked with conducting various hits on the leadership, joined in as the bloodshed spread, while those under Nevers' enemy Guise held back once they had achieved the satisfaction of executing their enemy Coligny. Though he was keen to 'cleanse' Paris of the Protestants he was not entirely insensitive to diplomatic needs. When he encountered the terrified English ambassador besieged in his house, Nevers drove away the besiegers and placed the ambassador under guard.

=== Massacre of Saint Bartholomew ===
Keen to spread the massacre into the provinces, Nevers likely instructed his men to perpetrate the massacre that occurred in La Charité-sur-Loire, his forces arriving on 26 August. Meanwhile La Rochelle a largely Protestant town, horrified at the massacre's across France, entered rebellion against the crown. Charles was determined to restore its obedience and a siege began. Nevers was among the host of nobles who were present on the siege lines for the unsuccessful effort to the reduce the town, the siege being called off after its commander was called off to become king of Poland-Lithuania. Indeed, Nevers was de facto leader of the military effort against the city, while it remained under the nominal command of Anjou. The king was not happy with this choice, and told Anjou he would prefer if the prince followed Retz as opposed to Nevers. During the siege Nevers had commanded the siege lines against the northern wall of the city and the bastion of Evangile. He quarrelled incessantly with the commander of the siege's artillery the baron de Biron who resented being subordinated to Nevers despite his authority over the city. He was critical of the common soldiers, who he accused of being unenthusiastic about conducting assaults, failing to follow their officers. With the siege concluded Anjou went first to Paris before departing, to explain the conduct of the operation, Retz and Nevers travelled with him, both of them having conduct to explain. All three of them would submit proposals to the crown for administrative and military reforms to avoid another debacle like the siege.

=== Poland ===
Anjou selected Nevers as one of the men to accompany him to the Commonwealth, still treating him as the chief adviser he had done since the 1560s. He was the princely exception among a retinue largely composed of secondary provincial nobility, mainly new men who Anjou had met on the siege lines of La Rochelle. Anjou was keen to disassociate himself from his mothers favourites for the most part. As Anjou settled in as king, Nevers became increasingly frustrated that Anjou was choosing to spend more time with Bellegarde, leaving him increasingly out in the cold. Excusing himself as unable to tolerate the weather he departed from the king. After Anjou returned from the country to become king of France as Henri III the two linked up again in Italy on the road home at Venzone. Upon reaching Turin, Anjou was cajoled by his aunt to yield the French Piedmont possessions on the far side of the Alps (Pinerolo, Savigliano and Perugia). He readily agreed, without consultation with his council or any of his Italian advisers. Nevers was furious that he had not been consulted about this destruction of his governate, with only the marquisate of Saluzzo left as a French possession beyond the Alps. He insisted on formerly registering his disapproval.

== Reign of Henri III ==
=== Intellectual interests ===
The new king was intellectually more curious than his young predecessors, and liked to hear philosophical discussions and debates, these lectures became known as the Académie du Palais, and Nevers was an infrequent attendee of these intellectual discourses. His wife Henriette also frequented them on occasion The new king was keen on theatre, this worked well with Nevers, who in 1571 had invited the first troop of Italian players into Paris. Nevers became one of the important patrons of the arts and sciences in 16th-century France. He fostered faience production in the Duchy of Nevers, beginning in 1588 under the Italian masters, the brothers Augustin Conrade, Baptiste Conrade, and Dominique Conrade from Albisola, and Giulio Gambin, who had worked in Lyon. Though a close friend of the new king, he remained strongly connected to his former patron Catherine, and as her personal influence declined with the king, he and Retz could often be relied to champion her views during council discussions.

The La Marcks had held the governorship of Normandie for some time, however in 1574 Henri-Robert de la Marck died. Henri was beset by demands from his powerful nobles seeking to secure the office as replacement. Nevers claimed that while the king had been in the Polish-Lithuanian Commonwealth he had promised Nevers the office, and when Henri refused to grant it to him he flew into a rage and departed court. Henri would settle on splitting the key governorship into three instead, to dilute the power of the office.

=== Alençon ===
After Alençon fled from court to join with the Malcontents, Henri struggled to find a commander to bring the young prince back to court. Eventually he turned to Nevers as his man for the job, a decision which was met with much laughter at court, due to the duke's war injuries that left him with a limp. Alençon travelled north to Dreux where he laid out the manifesto of his rebellion against the crown, lambasting his brother for relying on Italian advisers like Nevers for his administration. He began mustering forces at Dreux, far outmatching those that Nevers had brought with him to escort the prince back to the capital. Unable to militarily confront the prince he wrote to Catherine and Henri, explaining that his mission was not possible without reinforcements. His small force was also deteriorating, suffering defections to Alençon's camp in the days they faced off against one another. Catherine at first suggested to him trying to kidnap Alençon via covert means to avoid a direct confrontation, she then abandoned this policy. Catherine decided to negotiate personally with her son, who had now departed Dreux towards the Loire. Nevers who had been following the prince, was instructed to go no further than Chartres and hold back while the queen mother negotiated. He would have no further military engagements with Alençon.

=== Ligueur ===
The fifth war of religion was brought to a close with the generous Peace of Monsieur which was highly favourable to the Protestants, in the hopes of re-securing Alençon's loyalty to the crown. Militant Catholics reacted with disgust to the terms, and Nevers was among those who pushed for Henri to overturn the peace and ensure that there was only one religion in France. Nevers did not however exert much of his energies against the specifics of the piece as they related to a town of his, Mézières being given as surety to Condé, alienating much of the area from him and sending it into the arms of the local Guise clients. Catherine listened to Nevers' demands for a resumption of war frustratedly, trying to impart to him that while she and her son supported a sole religion, the financial situation of the kingdom simply couldn't support a war to achieve that. The Estates General of 1576, called as a term of the peace, and the vote of the council, forced Henri to follow Nevers' advice and re-open war. Indeed, Nevers spoke passionately at the estates, conjuring up the language of a crusade in his urgings for France to expunge heresy. At this time, Nevers was heavily in debt, with creditors through the Parlements such as the Séguiers, but he was soon to be bailed out of his financial situation by his patron Catherine, ensuring in future his greater loyalty to the crown.

=== Sixth war of religion ===
In conflict once more, Henri decided the now loyal Alençon would lead the royal army against the Protestants. As a symbol of the reunited Valois dynasty. Alençon lacked much in the way of military skill however, so real authority in the army would rest with Nevers, supported by Guise and Mayenne. Indeed, the king instructed Nevers to keep Alençon safely away from any place on the field that might be in danger. Throughout this period Catherine was desperately seeking a way to achieve peace, Nevers remained in opposition to such a policy. The army under Nevers command laid siege to La Charité, on the Loire, the site in which Nevers' soldiers had committed a massacre back in 1572. The army was of considerable size, however the bankrupt crown struggled to keep it in the field, with Henri writing to Nevers to ensure our 'deniers are used sparingly.' By late April 1577 Alençon wrote urgently to the king speaking of the plight of their men. Nevertheless, by 2 May the city surrendered, quickly falling prey to the starved and unpaid men of Nevers' army which brutally sacked the town. Alençon was received in glory when he returned to court, fêted and given all the credit for a victory the king had made sure he wasn't involved in. It was decided to continue the offensive on 8 May towards Issoire in the Auvergne. By now the royal army was only 5000 strong, and tried at first to negotiate with the city leaders, they were uninterested however, describing the siege as a violation of the peace edict. Keen to make an example of the town, the king instructed Nevers to proceed with a siege, and after 2 weeks of bombardment, the town was captured. Scenes of great brutality accompanied its fall, as every Protestant house in the town was burned to the ground, while the soldiers went about raping and murdering the inhabitants. The army, now numbering 2000 men continued on into the Limousin, Nevers complaining to the king in letters about his lack of ammunition and his troops unwillingness to fight. The city of Limoges, keen to avoid the presence of these troops within its walls, offered the army 30,000 not to billet in the city. The king urged him to accept, and admitted he could not pay the army any more. Nevers and the remaining troops were recalled from the field. While the army had achieved several successes on the Loire, it was unable to make much headway against the main Protestant centres, and the king came to terms with them in the harsher Treaty of Bergerac in September 1577.

Nevers was among the grandees who gathered in 1583 at the personal invitation of the king for an Assembly of Notables. 68 Notables in total attended to discuss reform programs for the kingdom. The intended course of the sessions was derailed however, by the Cardinal de Bourbon who fell on his knees and begged the king to restore singular Catholic worship in the kingdom. Some progress was derived from the discussions however, and it was agreed that Henri would curb the extravagant expenditure that he had bestowed upon his favourites in the prior decade. In general the king was reinforced in his desire to reduce the spending required to upkeep the court.

=== Second ligue ===
At the foundation of the second ligue in 1584, it was hoped by Guise and Philip II of Spain that Nevers would be amenable to participating, and as such a place was reserved for him among the leadership of the group. The ligue aimed to block the right of succession of the Protestant Navarre to the French throne, now being next in line after the death of the king's brother Alençon. Unable to suppress his views on the succession he joined the ligue in 1584, but was not involved in any military operations, despite having been named commander of a ligue army in 1584. He and the king were in unison in their opposition to Guise's usurpation of the governor of the town of Mézières, when he replaced the governor with his own man, however Guise refused to back down. While the king would eventually satisfy himself with the new reality in the town, Nevers continued to angle for the prior office holder, succeeding in installing him in 1587. After the Treaty of Flaix in 1585 in which the king capitulated to the ligue Catherine was able to negotiate his departure from it, restoring his loyalty to the crown. After this point he remained loyal to the crown when faced with its successor. As such when Henri faced off with the ligueur Charles, Duke of Aumale who was trying to seize Boulogne as a staging ground for the Spanish Armada, the king appointed Nevers as governor of Picardie to replace the recently deceased Prince of Condé confident that he would reliably support the crown against Aumale's influence in the region. The ligueurs refused to hand over the towns of Douellens or Le Crotoy to him. This appointment proved brief however, and in January 1589, he was relieved of the office in favour of Henri I d'Orléans, Duke of Longueville, the son of Léonor d'Orléans who had governed Picardie from 1569 to 1573, and who was descended from the Valois through the bastard of Orléans. In return for yielding the office, Nevers was offered the governorship of Champagne. He accepted, though he demanded that it be in the name of his son, as such while he governed Champagne, it would be his son who formerly held the office until his death, when his son unified the theoretical and practical control of the region. To support him and his son as lieutenant-general of the region, Joachim de Dinteville was maintained, largely able to act as governor in his own right, due to the absence of the Gonzague from the province.

In August 1587, the king outlined how he planned to personally lead the army against the Protestant reiters who were crossing the border into France in support of Navarre. All of his council virulently opposed the suggestion, arguing it was far too dangerous. Nevers however stood alone in support of the proposal, arguing that if the king secured a victory against the Protestant mercenaries that it would disarm the ability of Guise to claim pre-eminence as a defender of Catholicism. The king liked this idea and sent Guise with inadequate forces to block the German approach while he commanded the main body. His plan did not proceed as expected however, the German army began to disintegrate after crossing into France and was picked off by Guise in two battles.

=== Guise ===
The Estates General of 1588 required the presence of Guise, as such he abdicated his command of the army in Poitou to Nevers while he went to attend to the sessions, hoping they would support his ligueur proposals against the king. The king faced a ligueur assembly and was compelled into humiliating concessions. In return the Estates granted him a small sum of 120,000 livres while offering 100,000 livres directly to the armies under Mayenne and Nevers.

With the various humiliations forced upon him by the Guise and Ligue the king resolved to have them killed. In December 1588 his assassination plot fired, and the duke of Guise was murdered while attending a council session. The cardinal de Guise meanwhile was aggressively interrogated by the king's men, and confessed under duress that there was a plan for Nevers and other Catholic notables to capture the king.

=== Collapse of royal authority ===
In the wake of these assassinations, Paris rose up and declared for the ligue. The new ligue administration of the city, the 'sixteen', urged Nevers to join them. After several weeks he responded, informing the ligue that he was of course sympathetic to their desires for a country free of heresy, but chastising them for trying to achieve it in defiance of the king. He highlighted recent reversals for the Catholic cause in Europe, at the Battle of Coutras, the Spanish Armada and other defeats, informing the city that these were gods punishment for internal Catholic divisions. He warned the city that if they continued in this manner, France might face a ruin akin to that of the Byzantine Empire. The sixteen shot back that if he continued to be loyal to the king his honour would be tarnished, but he refused to entertain their advances. The late dukes wife Catherine de Clèves was equally optimistic Nevers might be a tool against the 'monster' who had murdered her husband, however he rebuffed her advances also. His vassal town in Rethel, that of Mézières informed him that he had to declare his intentions, or else the town would declare for the ligue, he allowed the deadline to expire and the town joined the 'holy union'.

The king licked his wounds in Tours as his situation spiralled out of control. Many of his advisors urged him to come to terms with Navarre, forming an alliance against the ligue. Nevers bitterly opposed such suggestions, outlining a picture of a ruined lawless France where Catholicism was illegal if such an alliance came to pass. Henri ignored these warnings, deciding to come to terms with his heir. Nevers in disgust departed the court, however he merely retired to his estates, not entering the ligue camp. From his home in the Nivernois he promised Henri he was still loyal and that he would suffer the afflictions god would send to him for his sins of remaining loyal to the crown. The two maintained contact over the following months By June Nevers had become aware of plots to kill the king, writing in disgust to a friend of the wicked and sinful schemes to harm the lawful king. The following month Henri would be assassinated by the radical Catholic Jacques Clément.

== Reign of Henri IV ==
=== War against the ligue ===
With the assassination of Henri III, the matter of his service to a Protestant king was immediately put to the test. Nevers wavered, departing from the royal army to his estates and offering vague overtures to the ligue for a couple of months, however he was secured for the royal fold. Fighting for his new king, in 1590 the combat reached Champagne as the duke of Lorraine invaded France in support of the ligue. He quickly captured Villefranche, the commander of whom was promptly hanged by Nevers for having yielded too easily to the attackers. Two years later Henri would campaign against the ligue in the region. Nevers urged him on to reduce the town of Épernay. Biron was killed in the initial attempt, and when reinforced by troops under Nevers, the town was captured, a heavy blow to the nearby ligueurs in Reims. In 1593 he held Beauce for the crown against any attempts to seize it by the ligue. Chaumont held out until 1594, when upon hearing of the fall of Paris to Henri, the town councillors opened up lines of communication to Dinteville and Nevers, surrendering the town. Guise continued holding out until October 1594, hoping to receive the governorship of Champagne, the king however was not willing to deprive the Gonzague-Nevers of this privilege and he was offered the governorship of Provence in return for surrendering Reims and the other towns under his control.

=== Diplomat ===
Nevers was given the sensitive task by Henri IV in 1593 of communicating his conversion to Catholicism to the Pope, such that he could be granted absolution. Achieving absolution was seen as a necessary pre-requisite to the acceptance of many of the Catholic magnates who backed the ligue. In response the ligue sent the Jesuit Antonio Possevino to argue against Nevers. Nevers faced an uphill battle in his task, being accepted into Rome only due to his Mantuan nobility, and not as a representative of the 'Béarnais' the ligueur pejorative for Henri IV. As he and his allies worked to bring the Pope round, the ligueurs fell into disagreement over whether the Pope granting absolution was enough to make Henri acceptable as king. While Nevers had been told he would not be accepted as an ambassador, this was not confirmed until January 1594, and came as a heavy blow to the royalist camp. Henri tried again in 1595, and after meeting several conditions for the Pope, was granted absolution in September of that year.

=== Finance and death ===
Upon the death of François d'O in 1594, who had monopolised the financial administration of the kingdom, the conseil des finances was reconstituted. It would consist of four sword nobles: Retz, Damville, Schomberg and Nevers, and other figures from the administrative nobility. The group set about engaging in every fiscal expedient they could imagine to raise finances for the kingdom, selling off offices, leasing out royal territory, floating loans and creating new offices to sell. In 1595, he died.

== Sources ==
- Boltanski, Ariane (2006). Les ducs de Nevers et l'État royal: genèse d'un compromis (ca 1550 - ca 1600) (in French). Librairie Droz. ISBN 9782600010221.
- Braham, Allan; Smith, Peter (1973). François Mansart. London: A. Zwemmer. ISBN 9780302022511
- Carroll, Stuart (2009). Martyrs and Murderers: The Guise Family and the Making of Europe. Oxford University Press.
- Cloulas, Ivan (1985). Henri II. Fayard.
- Condren, John (2021). "The role of women in Louis XIV's relationship with the Gonzaga-Nevers di Mantova between 1665 and 1691". In Anderson, Roberta; Santaliestra, Laura Oliván; Suner, Suna (eds.). Gender and Diplomacy: Women and Men in European Embassies from the 15th to the 18th century. Hollitzer Verlag.
- Durot, Éric (2012). François de Lorraine, duc de Guise entre Dieu et le Roi. Classiques Garnier.
- Harding, Robert (1978). Anatomy of a Power Elite: the Provincial Governors in Early Modern France. Yale University Press.
- Holt, Mack P. (2002). The Duke of Anjou and the Politique Struggle During the Wars of Religion. Cambridge University Press.
- Holt, Mack P. (2005). The French Wars of Religion, 1562-1629. Cambridge University Press.
- Jouanna, Arlette (1998). Histoire et Dictionnaire des Guerres de Religion. Bouquins.
- Jouanna, Arlette (2007). The St Bartholomew's Day Massacre: The Mysteries of a Crime of State. Manchester University Press.
- Knecht, Robert (2010). The French Wars of Religion, 1559-1598. Routledge.
- Knecht, Robert (2014). Catherine de' Medici. Routledge.
- Knecht, Robert (2016). Hero or Tyrant? Henry III, King of France, 1574-1589. Routledge.
- Konnert, Mark (2006). Local Politics in the French Wars of Religion: The Towns of Champagne, the Duc de Guise and the Catholic League 1560-1595. Ashgate.
- Oman, Charles (1937). A History of the Art of War in the Sixteenth Century. Metheun.
- Riccardi-Cubit, Monique (1996). "France, VII, 1(i)(a): Pottery, before 1600: Lead-glazed", vol. 11, pp. 603–607, in The Dictionary of Art, 34 volumes, edited by Jane Turner. New York: Grove. ISBN 9781884446009.
- Roelker, Nancy (1996). One King, One Faith: The Parlement of Paris and the Religious Reformation of the Sixteenth Century. University of California Press.
- Salmon, J.H.M (1975). Society in Crisis: France during the Sixteenth Century. Metheun & Co.
- Sutherland, Nicola (1962). The French Secretaries of State in the Age of Catherine de Medici. The Athlone Press.
- Sutherland, Nicola (1980). The Huguenot Struggle for Recognition. Yale University Press.
- Thomson, David (1984). Renaissance Paris: Architecture and Growth 1475–1600. Berkeley and Los Angeles: University of California Press. ISBN 0520053478.
- Thompson, James (1909). The Wars of Religion in France 1559-1576: The Huguenots, Catherine de Medici and Philip II. Chicago University Press.
- Ward, A.W.; Prothero, G.W.; Leathes, Stanley, eds. (1911). The Cambridge Modern History. Vol. XIII. The Macmillan Company.
- Wood, James (2002). The King's Army: Warfare, Soldiers and Society during the Wars of Religion in France, 1562-1576. Cambridge University Press.
