= Antoine III de Croÿ =

- Prince de Porcien
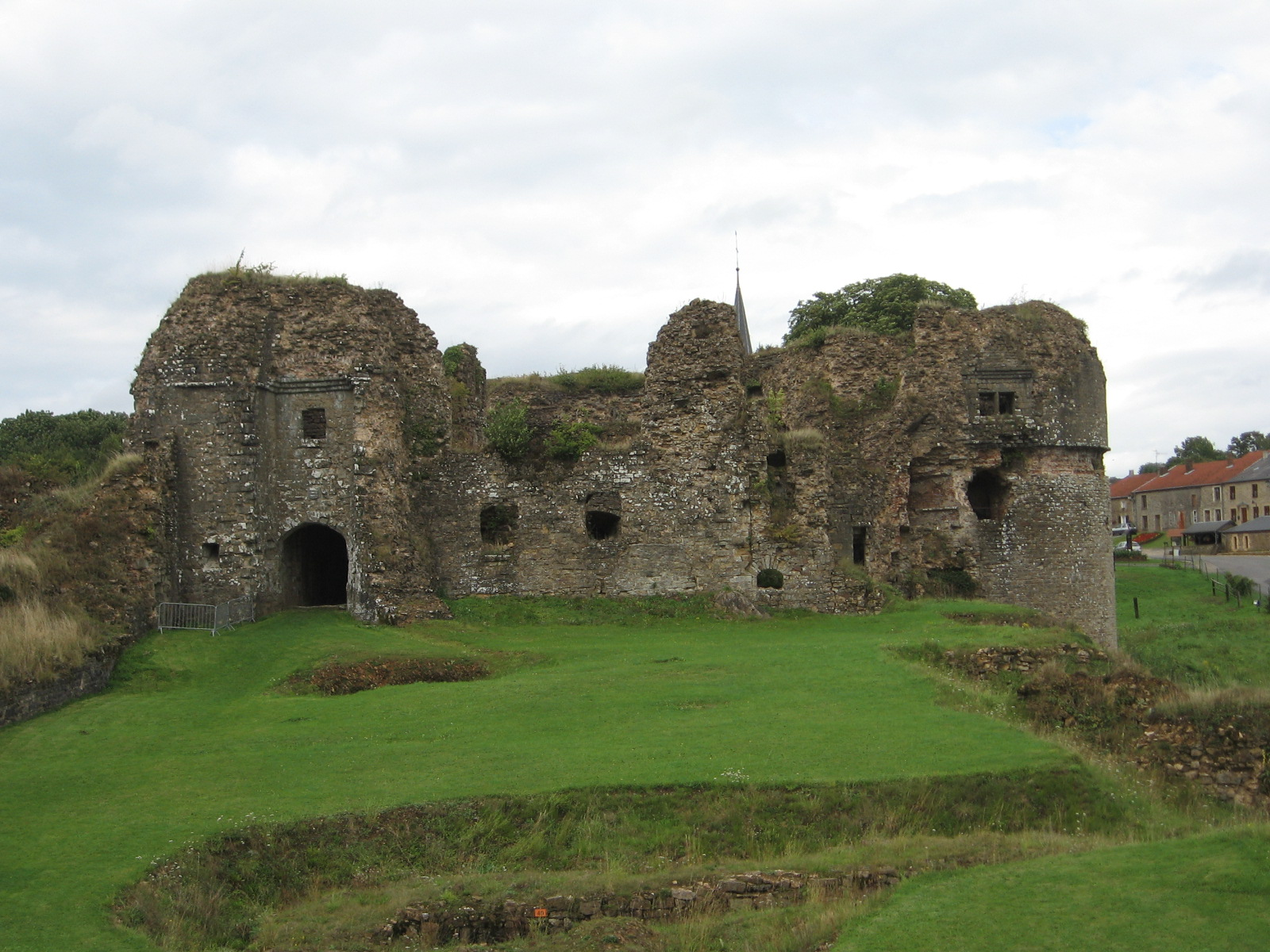
- Porcien's castle Montcornet, raised to a principality in 1561
- Born: January 1540; Kingdom of France
- Died: January 1567 (aged 26–27)
- Family: House of Croÿ
- Spouse: Catherine de Clèves
- Father: Charles de Croÿ
- Mother: Françoise d'Amboise

Antoine III de Croÿ, Prince de Porcien (1540–1567) was a French noble and Protestant rebel. Porcien, who held the rank of prince through his sovereign possessions, was a member of the Croÿ family. In 1558 his mother converted to Protestantism, and he followed her in 1560. His house, de Croÿ had been close with the Guise who used them as part of their broader rivalry with the House of Montmorency, supporting their claims that hurt their rival. Porcien broke with the Guise after his conversion. With the advent of Francis II's reign he joined Navarre in opposition to their house. The following year a strategic marriage was arranged for him with Catherine de Clèves which would bring him the County of Eu in 1564.

During the first civil war he fought against the crown, attempting to invade Champagne (province) in July though was not able to achieve much success. He returned to royal favour with the establishment of peace and got into a bitter dispute with Aumale. He would back the Montmorency in their feud with the Guise in 1565, fighting against Charles, Cardinal of Lorraine in a skirmish when he tried to enter Paris. The following year he would be working in the Spanish Netherlands with Robert IV de la Marck in the aim of a transnational Protestant alliance against Spain. He died in 1567, with accusations of poisoning surrounding his death. His wife remarried his enemy the Duke of Guise

== Early life and family ==
In the 1550s the Croÿ family was close with the Guise, who supported them in their disputes with the Montmorency. Porciens château sat at the strategic location of Montcornet between Metz and Sedan.

Porcien was born in 1540, the son of Charles de Croÿ and Françoise d'Amboise. Porcien, whose mother had converted in 1558, expressed his Protestantism openly among aristocratic circles.

In August 1560 during a grand joint wedding, Porcien was married to Catherine de Clèves in a Catholic ceremony. At the same ceremony Clèves father Nevers remarried. Clèves had been raised after the death of her mother at Joinville by the duchess of Guise and so was at the point of their marriage, Catholic, unlike her husband who converted to Protestantism that year.

On 4 June 1561 the seigneurie of Porcien was raised to a principality, making Porcien a sovereign prince.

== Reign of Henri II ==
In 1559, Porcien was still an opponent of the Montmorency and he tried to provoke François de Montmorency into a duel with his taunts.

== Reign of Francis II ==
With the sudden death of Henri II the Guise took control of the government of his young successor rapidly. Those who opposed the Guise travelled south, to Navarre, achieving juncture with him in Vendôme on his journey north. Among those opponents of the new regime, Porcien met with Navarre, Condé and the Vidame of Chartres, however no course of action was agreed upon.

== Reign of Charles IX ==
=== First civil war ===
At the advent of the first civil war in 1562, Porcien was a signatory of Condé's declaration alongside the other leader Protestant rebels. Porcien sought to sneak his troops into his brother in laws government, Champagne to seize the towns for the rebels in July. They threatened to attack the city of Troyes but their assault did not materialise. In October he operated with François de Coligny d'Andelot to accompany German reiter mercenaries into the kingdom.

=== Inheritance ===
Through his wife Clèves, Porcien inherited the important Norman holding of the County of Eu in 1564. The Guise disputed the inheritance of the county, feeling betrayed by Porciens support for the Protestants in the civil war. Using this newfound territory he established a Protestant chapel at Roumare near Rouen. Roumare was an appenage of Eu, owned by the cathedral chapter of Rouen who held all rights their except for high justice, which was held by the count of Eu, allowing Porcien to build there. The cathedral resented the building of the chapel bitterly, though it was technically legal by the Edict of Amboise. The Parlement of Rouen took an interest in the dispute in 1566, and Porcien fumed at the 'machinations' of the ultra Catholics on the court in how they adjudicated the disagreement.

=== Grand tour ===
Aiming to reinforce the authority of the king on the provinces which had so recently demonstrated their rebellious instincts, and ensure the obedience of the leading aristocrats and bodies to the Edict of Amboise, the court embarked upon a grand tour of France in 1564. Porcien accompanied the court on its route, and in Champagne got into a violent quarrel with Aumale of the powerful Guise family, the governor of Champagne.

=== Feud ===
The following year, as the Montmorency-Guise feud heated up, initially fuelled by the Assassination of the Duke of Guise (1563), Lorraine decided to make a show of force entry into Paris. Paris was a Montmorency stronghold and the governor of the Île-de-France François de Montmorency. Montmorency went to the Parlement of Paris on 8 January, declaring he could not tolerate Lorraine's plan to flout the prohibition on arms in Paris with his armed entry and declared that he would not allow Lorraine to enter the city. Lorraine and his brother Aumale ignored this prohibition and entered via different gates under arms. Montmorency and Porcien were waiting at the Saint-Denis gate, and they descended into a violent skirmish with Lorraine's forces. Lorraine came out the worse, two of his men dead, and he fled to a nearby house.

=== Dutch enterprise ===
Porcien was involved alongside the duke of Bouillon in intrigues in the Spanish Netherlands in the years 1566–7, as they planned how to create a united front to make war on Spain.

When Porcien died in 1567, Lorraine was widely accused of having poisoned him. Lorraine celebrated the death describing it as a 'useful and happy' circumstance. On his death bed, Porcien urged his wife not to marry Henry I, Duke of Guise; this was for nought and she would marry him in 1570.

== Sources ==
- Carroll, Stuart (1998). Noble Power during the French Wars of Religion: The Guise Affinity and the Catholic Cause in Normandy. Cambridge University Press.
- Carroll, Stuart (2009). Martyrs and Murderers: The Guise Family and the Making of Europe. Oxford University Press.
- Carroll, Stuart (2013). "'Nager Entre deux Eaux': The Princes and the Ambiguities of French Protestantism". Sixteenth Century Journal. 44 (4): 985–1020.
- Harding, Robert (1978). Anatomy of a Power Elite: the Provincial Governors in Early Modern France. Yale University Press.
- Potter, David (2001). "The French Protestant Nobility in 1562: The 'Associacion de Monseigneur le Prince de Condé". French History. 15 3.
- Roberts, Penny (1996). A City in Conflict: Troyes during the French Wars of Religion. Manchester University Press.
- Roelker, Nancy (1968). Queen of Navarre: Jeanne d'Albret 1528-1572. Harvard University Press.
- Salmon, J.H.M (1975). Society in Crisis: France during the Sixteenth Century. Metheun & Co.
- Thompson, James (1909). The Wars of Religion in France 1559-1576: The Huguenots, Catherine de Medici and Philip II. Chicago University Press.
