= Battle of St. Quentin (1557) =

Part of the Italian War of 1551–1559

Coordinates: 49.8486°N 3.2864°E

- Part of the Italian War of 1551–1559
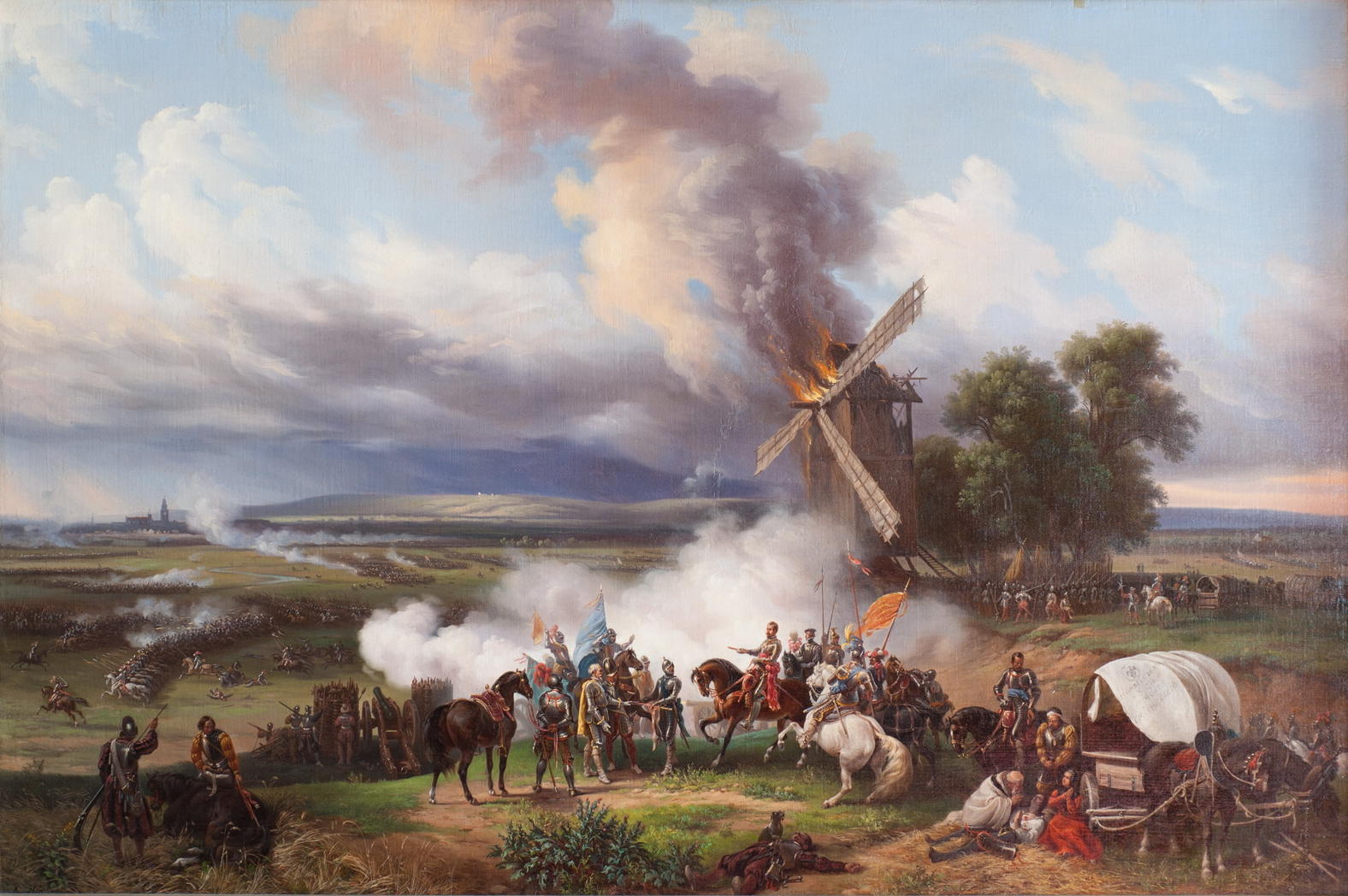
- French surrender to the Duke of Savoy Emanuele Filiberto
Date	10 August 1557
Location	Saint-Quentin, France
Result	Spanish victory

Belligerents
Kingdom of France	Spanish Empire: Seventeen Provinces; Duchy of Savoy; Kingdom of England

Commanders and leaders
(Kingdom of France) Louis de Gonzague (Kingdom of France) Anne de Montmorency (POW)	(Spain) (Savoy) Duke Emmanuel Philibert (Spain) Ferrante I Gonzaga (Spain) Count of Egmont (Spain) Julián Romero

Strength
26,000	50,000–80,000

Casualties and losses
10,000 casualties (3,000 killed and 7,000 captured) or 14,000	1,000

The Battle of Saint-Quentin of 1557 was a decisive engagement of the Italian War of 1551–1559 between the Kingdom of France and the Spanish Empire, at Saint-Quentin in Picardy. A Habsburg Spanish force under Duke Emmanuel Philibert of Savoy defeated a French army under the command of Louis de Gonzague, and Anne de Montmorency, Duke of Montmorency.

== Battle ==
The battle took place on the Feast Day of St. Lawrence 10 August. Philibert, with his 7,000 English allies, (Note: Henry Kamen, Philip of Spain (1997) gives a brief account based on contemporary sources, noting that Spanish troops constituted about 10% of the Habsburg total. Kamen claims that the battle was "won by a mainly Netherlandish army commanded by the non-Spaniards the duke of Savoy and the earl of Egmont". On the other hand, Geoffrey Parker states that Spanish troops were decisive in defeating the French at St. Quentin owing to their high value, as well as in defeating the Ottomans at Hungary in 1532 and at Tunis in 1535, and the German protestants at Mühlberg in 1547. Kamen states that Philip was busy organizing his Italian and German troops.) (Note: England had entered the war at the behest of Phillip II, on 7 June 1557.) had placed St. Quentin under siege. Montmorency with a force of around 26,000 men marched to St. Quentin to relieve the city. Facing a force twice their size, Montmorency attempted to gain access to St. Quentin through a marsh, but a delayed French withdrawal allowed the Spanish to defeat the French and capture Montmorency.

During the battle the Saint-Quentin collegiate church was badly damaged by fire.

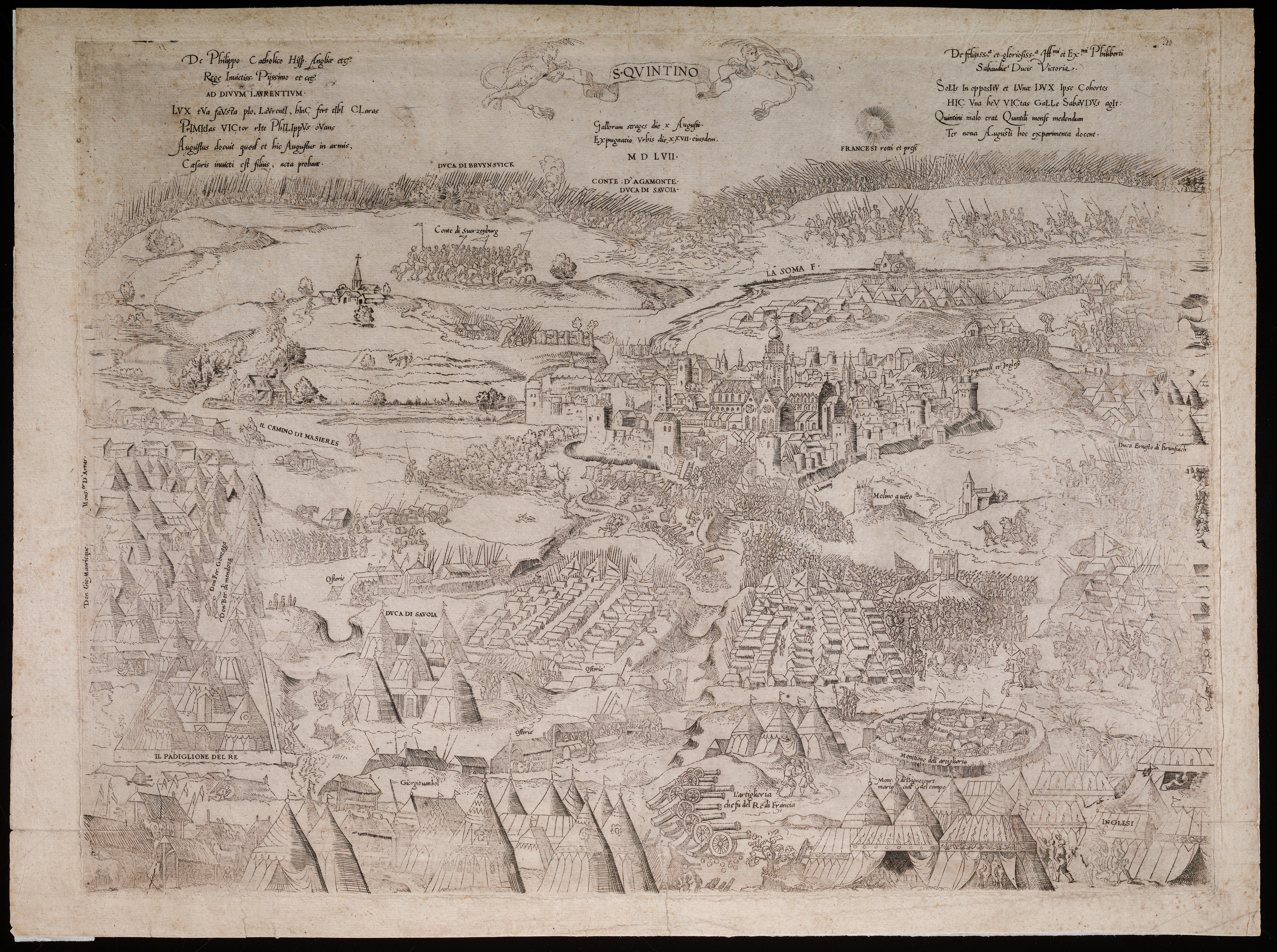
Anonymous view of the 1557 battle of Saint-Quentin.

== Aftermath ==
After the victory over the French at St. Quentin, "the sight of the battlefield gave Philip a permanent distaste for war"; he declined to pursue his advantage, withdrawing to the Spanish Netherlands to the north, where he had been the Governor since 1555. In 1558, the Habsburgs won again at the Battle of Gravelines. The Treaty of Cateau-Cambrésis ended the war in 1559.

== Feast of Saint Lawrence ==
Being extremely pious, Philip II was aware that 10 August is the Feast of Saint Lawrence, a Roman deacon who was roasted on a gridiron for his Christian beliefs. Hence, in commemoration of the great victory on St Lawrence's Day, Philip sent orders to Spain that a great palace in the shape of a gridiron should be built in the Guadarrama Mountains northwest of Madrid. Known as El Escorial, it was finally completed in 1584.

== Notable participants ==
The Frenchman Martin Guerre, who was later famously impersonated in his home village, fought for the Spanish and lost his leg at St. Quentin.

== In culture ==
Se armó la de San Quintín ("It became the one of St. Quentin") is a Spanish proverbial phrase to describe a big dispute.

== Sources ==
- Bonner, E.A. (1992). "Continuing the 'Auld Alliance' in the Sixteenth Century". In Simpson, Grant G. (ed.). The Scottish Soldier Abroad, 1247–1967. Rowman & Littlefield.
- Kamen, Henry (1997). Philip of Spain. Yale University Press. ISBN 9780300070811.
- Klaiber, Susan (1993). Guarino Guarini's Theatine Architecture (Thesis). Vol. 1. Columbia University Press.
- Leathes, Stanley (1907). "Habsburg and Valois". In Ward, Adolphus William (ed.). The Cambridge Modern History. Vol. 10. Cambridge University Press.
- Nolan, Cathal J. (2006). The Age of Wars of Religion, 1000–1650: An Encyclopedia of Global Warfare and Civilization. Vol. 2. Greenwood Publishing Group.
- Parker, Geoffrey (1989). España y la rebelión de Flandes. Nerea.
- Parker, Geoffrey (2014). Imprudent King: A new life of Philip II. Yale University Press. p. 53.
- Tucker, Spencer C., ed. (2010). "August 10, 1557". A Global Chronology of Conflict: From the Ancient World to the Modern Middle East. Vol. II. ABC-CLIO.
- Wilson, Peter H. (2016). Heart of Europe: A History of the Holy Roman Empire. Harvard University Press.
- Oman, Charles (1937). A History of the Art of War in the Sixteenth Century. E.P. Dutton. p. 598.
