= Catherine of Cleves =

French countess (1548–1633)

Catherine
- Duchess consort of Guise; suo jure Countess of Eu
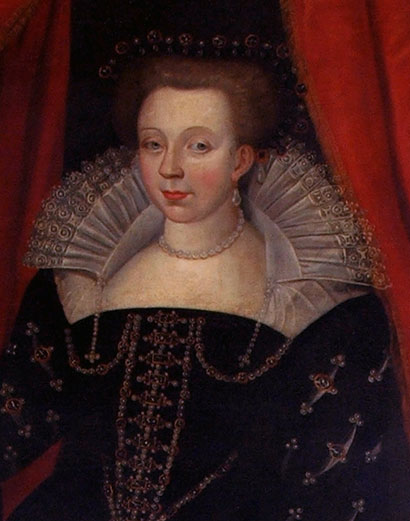
- Born: 1548
- Died: 11 May 1633 (aged 84–85); Château d'Eu, France
- Spouse: Antoine III de Croÿ, Prince of Porcien; Henri de Lorraine, Duke of Guise
- Issue Detail: Charles, Duke of Guise; Louis III, Cardinal of Guise; Claude, Duke of Chevreuse; François Alexandre, Knight of the Order of Malta; Renée, Abbess of St. Pierre; Jeanne, Abbess of Jouarre; Louise Marguerite, Princess of Conti
- House: La Marck
- Father: Francis I, Duke of Nevers
- Mother: Marguerite de Bourbon
- Religion: Roman Catholicism Calvinism (1560-1570)

Catherine of Cleves (or of Nevers), Countess of Eu (1548 – 11 May 1633) was the wife of Henry I, Duke of Guise and the matriarch of the powerful and influential House of Guise. By marriage, she was Duchess of Guise from 1570 to 1588, and Dowager Duchess of Guise thereafter. She was also Countess of Eu in her own right from 1564.

== Biography ==
Catherine was the second daughter of Francis of Cleves, Duke of Nevers, and Margaret of Bourbon, the elder sister of Antoine de Bourbon. She was the first cousin of Henry III of Navarre, the sister-in-law of Henry of Bourbon, Prince of Condé, and great-aunt of Ludwika Maria Gonzaga, the queen consort of Poland.

At the age of twelve, Catherine married the 19-year-old Antoine III de Croÿ, Prince de Porcien (or Porcean), who died seven years later, leaving her a widow at the young age of 19. Because of his marriage with Catherine de Cleves, a member of the House of Nevers, the feud over Beaufort and Coulommiers began as a dispute between the Croy and Nevers families. (Note: After Catherine's marriage to Henry of Guise, the dispute over Beaufort and Coulommiers would be between the Croy and Guise families.) Antoine de Croÿ was a Calvinist and demanded that his wife also adopt this faith. They had four children, all of whom died in early childhood. After the conventional three years of mourning, on 4 October 1570, Catherine married Henri de Lorraine, Duke of Guise, who was two years her junior. They had fourteen children, including Charles, Duke of Guise and Louis III, Cardinal of Guise. Catherine had a widely publicised affair with a young nobleman, the sieur de Saint-Mégrin, who was killed by her brother-in-law, the Duke of Mayenne. The event is dramatised in the Alexandre Dumas play Henri III et sa cour (1829).

Henry of Guise was the leader of the fervently Catholic faction in the French Wars of Religion. From 1584, the conflict among factions led by Henry of Guise, Henry of Navarre, and Henry III of France was known as the War of the Three Henrys. In 1588, Henry of Guise was assassinated on the orders of King Henry III.

Catherine never forgave Henry III of France (who kept taunting her as "la maîtresse de Saint Megrin") for his part in the assassination of her husband. She took a keen interest in the intrigues of the Catholic League and encouraged Henry III's assassination in 1589. At the conclusion of the War of the Three Henrys, she was mindful of the interests of her large family and supported her son Charles as a candidate for the French throne.

Catherine's reconciliation with her cousin, Henry IV of France, was not effected until his conversion to Catholicism. She immediately moved to Paris and obtained a very honorable position in the retinue of his wife, Marie de' Medici. In 1613, Catherine interceded for her son, François Alexandre, who had killed the Baron of Luz in a duel, asking for his banishment instead of execution for murder.

The Guises continued to support the queen throughout the regency, and Catherine followed Marie into exile in Blois after Louis XIII assumed the reins of government in 1619. After returning to the Louvre, the Dowager Duchess - anxious to promote the interests of the House of Guise - resumed plotting against Cardinal Richelieu.

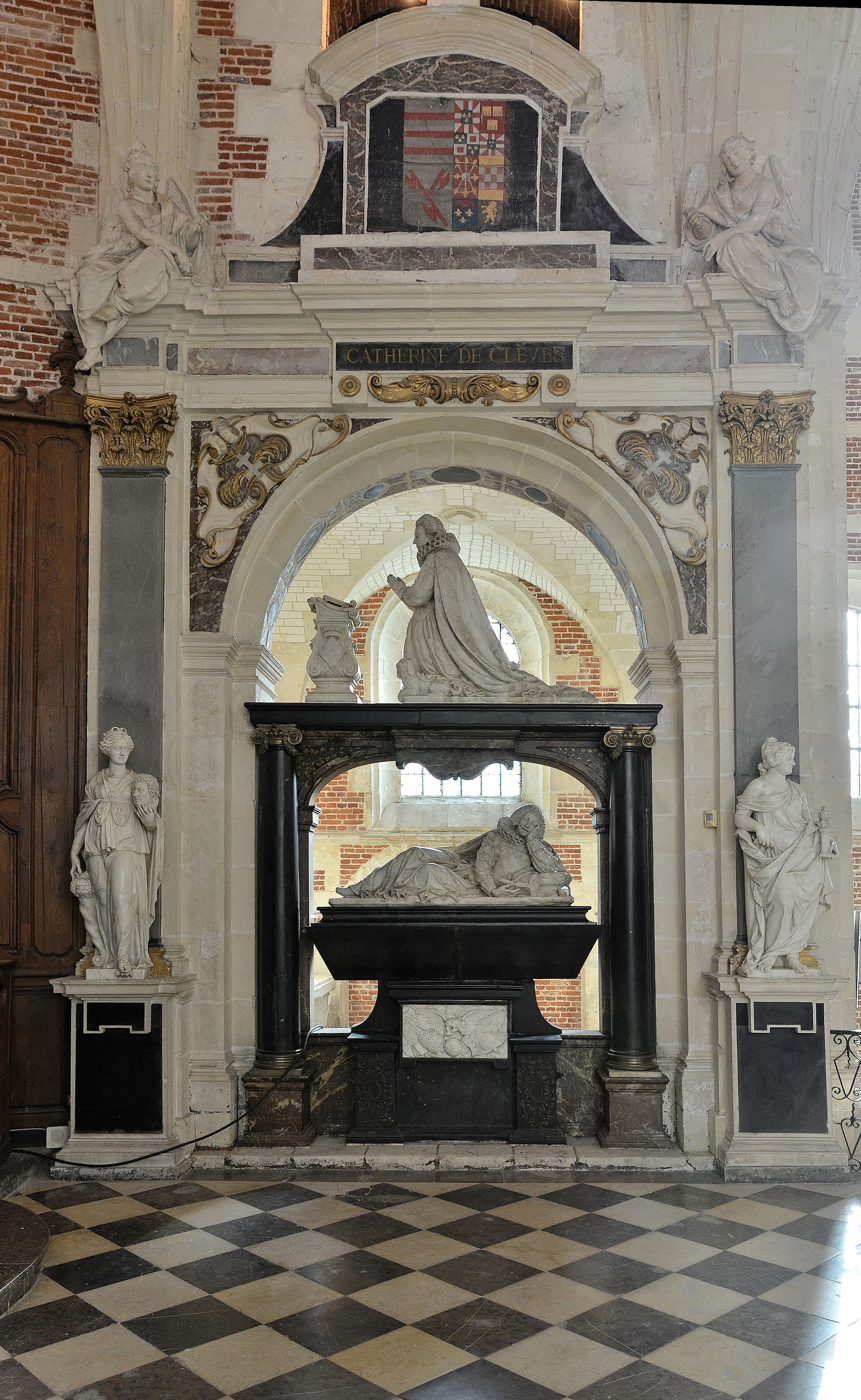
Catherine of Cleves' mausoleum in the chapel of the château d'Eu

The death of her youngest daughter, the princesse de Conti (who had been implicated in the Day of the Dupes conspiracy), proved a blow to her spirits. She retired to her château d'Eu, where she died aged 85. She was buried in the château chapel in a mausoleum adjacent to and directly mirroring her husband's ornate cenotaph.

== Issue ==
On October 4, 1560, at the age of twelve, Catherine married the Prince of Porcien, Antoine de Croy, who died in 1567.

Catherine remarried on October 4, 1570 in Paris to Henry I, Duke of Guise, by whom she had fourteen children, half of whom died in childhood:

1. Charles, Duke of Guise (1571–1640)
2. Henri (June 30, 1572, Paris – August 13, 1574), died in childhood
3. Catherine (November 3, 1573), died at birth
4. Louis III, Cardinal of Guise (1575–1621), Archbishop of Reims
5. Charles (January 1, 1576, Paris), died at birth
6. Marie (June 1, 1577 – 1582), died in childhood
7. Claude, Duke of Chevreuse (1578–1657) married Marie de Rohan, daughter of Hercule de Rohan, duc de Montbazon
8. Catherine (b. May 29, 1579), died in childhood
9. Christine (January 21, 1580), died at birth
10. François (May 14, 1581 – September 29, 1582), died in childhood
11. Renée (1585 – June 13, 1626, Reims), Abbess of St. Pierre
12. Jeanne (July 31, 1586 – October 8, 1638, Jouarre), Abbess of Jouarre
13. Louise Marguerite, (1588 – April 30, 1631, Château d'Eu), married at the Château de Meudon on July 24, 1605 François, Prince of Conti
14. François Alexandre (February 7, 1589 – June 1, 1614, Château des Baux-de-Provence), a Knight of the Order of Malta

== Ancestry ==
Ancestors of Catherine of Cleves

16. Jean I, Duc de Clèves
8. Engelbert de Clèves, Comte de Nevers
17. Elizabeth de Nevers
4. Charles II de Clèves, Count of Nevers
18. Jean VIII, Comte de Vendôme = 24
9. Charlotte de Bourbon-Vendôme
19. Isabelle de Beauvau = 25
2. François I de Clèves, Duc de Nevers
20. Arnaud Amanieu d'Albret, Seigneur d'Orval
10. Jean d'Albret, Seigneur d'Orval
21. Isabelle de La Tour d'Auvergne
5. Marie d'Albret, Comtesse de Rethel
22. Jean II, Comte de Nevers et de Rethel
11. Charlotte de Nevers, Comtesse de Rethel
23. Pauline de Bosse-Bretagne
1. Catherine of Cleves
24. Jean VIII, Comte de Vendôme = 18
12. François I, Comte de Vendôme
25. Isabelle de Beauvau = 19
6. Charles IV de Bourbon, Duc de Vendôme
26. Pierre II de Luxembourg
13. Marie de Luxembourg
27. Marguerite of Savoy
3. Marguerite de Bourbon-Vendôme
28. Jean II, Duc d'Alençon
14. René de Valois, Duc d'Alençon
29. Marie d'Armagnac
7. Françoise d'Alençon
30. Ferry II de Vaudémont
15. Marguerite de Lorraine
31. Yolande d'Anjou

== Sources ==
- Bergin, Joseph (1996). The Making of the French Episcopate, 1589-1661. Yale University Press. ISBN 9780300067514.
- Boltanski, Ariane (2006). Les ducs de Nevers et l'État royal: genèse d'un compromis (ca 1550 - ca 1600) (in French). Librairie Droz.
- McIlvenna, Una (2016). Scandal and Reputation at the Court of Catherine de Medici. Routledge.
- Soen, Violet (2016). "The Chièvres Legacy, the Croÿ Family and Litigation in Paris. Dynastic Identities between the Low Countries and France (1519-1559)". In Geevers, Liesbeth; Marini, Mirella (eds.). Dynastic Identity in Early Modern Europe: Rulers, Aristocrats and the Formation of Identities. Routledge.101
