= Philippe du Bec =

16th-century French churchman

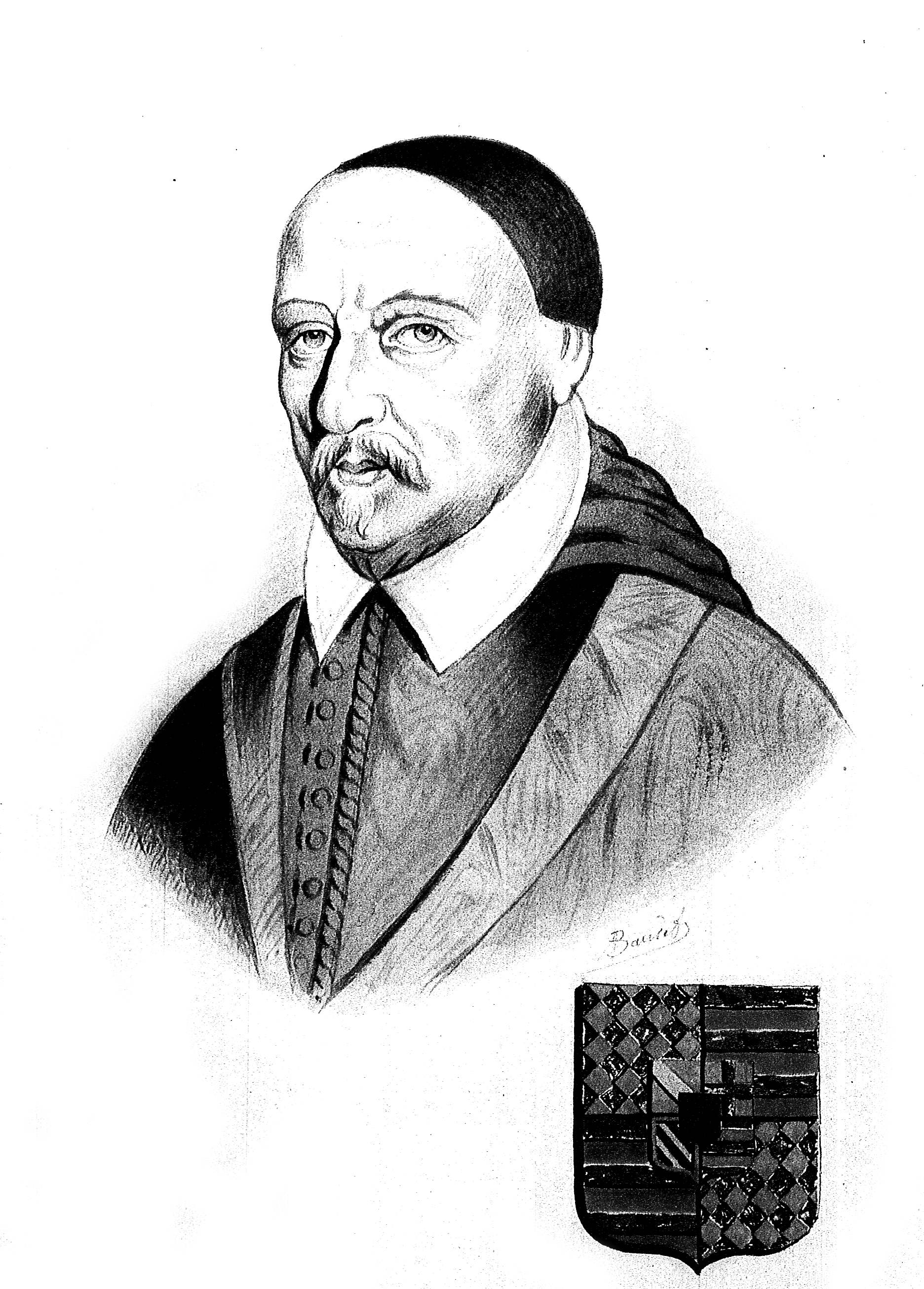
Bmr 92 Phillipe du Bec

Philippe Crespin du Bec (1519 – January 10, 1605) was a French churchman of the 16th century. He was successively Bishop of Vannes (1559–1566), Bishop of Nantes (1566–1594) and Archbishop of Reims (1594–1605). He was also a master of the King's Chapel and Commander of the Order of the Holy Spirit.

== Biography ==
Philippe du Bec is the second son of Charles du Bec, lord of Bourri and Vardes, vice-admiral of France, and his wife Magdelaine or Marguerite de Beauvillier.

=== Ecclesiastical career ===
Dean of the Saint-Maurice cathedral in Angers, he became bishop of Vannes in 1559, following the resignation of Sébastien de L'Aubespine. He participated in this capacity in the Council of Trent.

In 1566 he became Bishop of Nantes.

He attached himself to King Henry IV. He was present at his coronation on February 27, 1594, in the cathedral of Chartres, and as a prelate reminded him of the obligations of a Catholic monarch, then "the eldest son of the Church." Recognizing it, Henry IV named it in 1594 to Archbishop of Reims and made the following year Commander of its Orders.

Philippe du Bec died on 10 January 1605 at the age of 86 years.
