= Marie d'Albret, Countess of Rethel =

French countess (1491–1549)

Marie d'Albret
- suo jure Countess of Rethel; Countess of Nevers; Duchess of Nevers
- Coat-of-arms of Marie d'Albret
- Born: 25 March 1491; Chateau de Cuffy, Cher, France
- Died: 27 October 1549 (aged 58); Hotel de Nevers, Paris, France
- Noble family: Albret
- Spouse: Charles II of Cleves, Count of Nevers
- Issue: Francis I of Cleves, 1st Duke of Nevers, Count of Rethel (2 September 1516- 13 February 1561)
- Father: Jean d'Albret, Sire of Orval
- Mother: Charlotte of Nevers, Countess of Rethel

Marie d'Albret, Countess of Rethel, Countess of Nevers (25 March 1491 – 27 October 1549) was the suo jure Countess of Rethel, a title which she inherited at the age of nine upon the death of her mother, Charlotte of Nevers, Sovereign Countess of Rethel, on 23 August 1500. She was the wife of Charles II of Cleves, Count of Nevers.

== Early life ==
Marie was born in the Chateau de Cuffy, France on 25 March 1491, the eldest child of Jean d'Albret, Sire of Orval, Governor of Champagne, and Charlotte of Nevers, Countess of Rethel. She had two younger sisters, Charlotte d'Albret, wife of Odet de Foix, Count of Comminges; and Hélène d'Albret (16 July 1495- 28 October 1519). She had two illegitimate half-siblings, Jacques d'Albret, Bishop of Nevers, and Françoise d'Albret, Abbess of Notre Dame de Nevers.

Her paternal grandparents were Arnaud Amanieu d'Albret, Sire d'Orval (died 1463) and Isabelle de La Tour d'Auvergne (died 8 September 1488), daughter of Bertrand V of La Tour, Count of Auvergne and Boulogne and Jacquette du Peschin. Her maternal grandparents were John II, Count of Nevers, Count of Rethel and Pauline de Bosse-Bretagne. Marie's paternal great-great-grandfather was Charles d'Albret, Constable of France, who was killed while commanding the French troops at the Battle of Agincourt in 1415.

Marie became the sovereign Countess of Rethel at the age of nine upon the death of her mother, Charlotte, at the Chateau de Meillan-en-Berry, who had herself held the suo jure title.

== Marriage ==
On 25 January 1504, Marie married Charles II of Cleves, Count of Nevers (died 17 August 1521), the son of Engelbert, Count of Nevers and Charlotte of Bourbon-Vendôme. Upon her marriage she became the Countess of Nevers. Together Charles and Marie had:

- Francis I of Cleves, 1st Duke of Nevers, Count of Rethel (2 September 1516- 13 February 1561) on 19 January 1538 at the Louvre Palace he married Marguerite of Bourbon-La Marche (26 October 1516- 20 October 1589), daughter of Charles de Bourbon, Duke of Vendôme and Françoise of Alençon, by whom he had six children including Henriette of Cleves (31 October 1542- 24 June 1601), heiress to the Duchy of Nevers and County of Rethel, who in her own turn married Louis I Gonzaga of Mantua.

Marie became a widow in 1521. In 1539, she took the title of Duchess of Nevers, although in point of fact, her son Francis was the suo jure duke.

On 27 October 1549 Marie died at the Hotel de Nevers in Paris at the age of fifty-eight. Her son Francis succeeded her as Count of Rethel.

== Sources ==
- Boltanski, Ariane (2006). Les ducs de Nevers et l'État royal: genèse d'un compromis (ca 1550 - ca 1600) (in French). Librairie Droz.

Preceded by John II, Count of Nevers and Charlotte of Nevers	Countess of Rethel; 1500- 1549	Succeeded by Francis I of Cleves
