= Charles II, Count of Nevers =

Charles II, Duke of Nevers
- Coat-of-arms of Nevers
- Died: 1521; Louvre
- Noble family: La Marck
- Spouse: Marie d'Albret, Countess of Rethel
- Issue: Francis I, Duke of Nevers
- Father: Engelbert, Count of Nevers
- Mother: Charlotte de Bourbone-Vendome

Charles II (died 1521) was the Count of Nevers (1506–1521). He was the son of Engelbert de La Marck and Catherine de Bourbon-Vendome.

He belongs to the House de La Marck. His father Engelbert, Count of Nevers (1491–1506) was son of John I, Duke of Cleves (1384–1404) and Elisabeth Countess of Nevers. Elisabeth was great-granddaughter of Philip II duke of Burgundy.

Charles II succeeded his father in 1506. He married in 1504 to Marie d'Albret, Countess of Rethel, daughter of Jean d'Albret and Charlotte Countess of Rethel. Thus he became Count of Rethel jure uxoris. They had:

- Francis I 1516–1561, Duke of Nevers (1521–1561)

Charles II became entangled in intrigues at the court of King Francis I and was imprisoned in a tower of the Louvre in 1521. His mother and Charles III, Duke of Bourbon tried to get him released, but he died before they could secure his release.

== Sources ==
- Boltanski, Ariane (2006). Les ducs de Nevers et l'État royal: genèse d'un compromis (ca 1550 – ca 1600) (in French). Librairie Droz.

Charles II, Count of Nevers House of La Marck Died: 1521
Preceded by Engelbert	Count of Nevers; 1506–1521	Succeeded by Francis I
