= Marie of Cleves, Princess of Condé =

Princess of Condé (1553–1574)

Marie de Clèves
- Princess of Condé
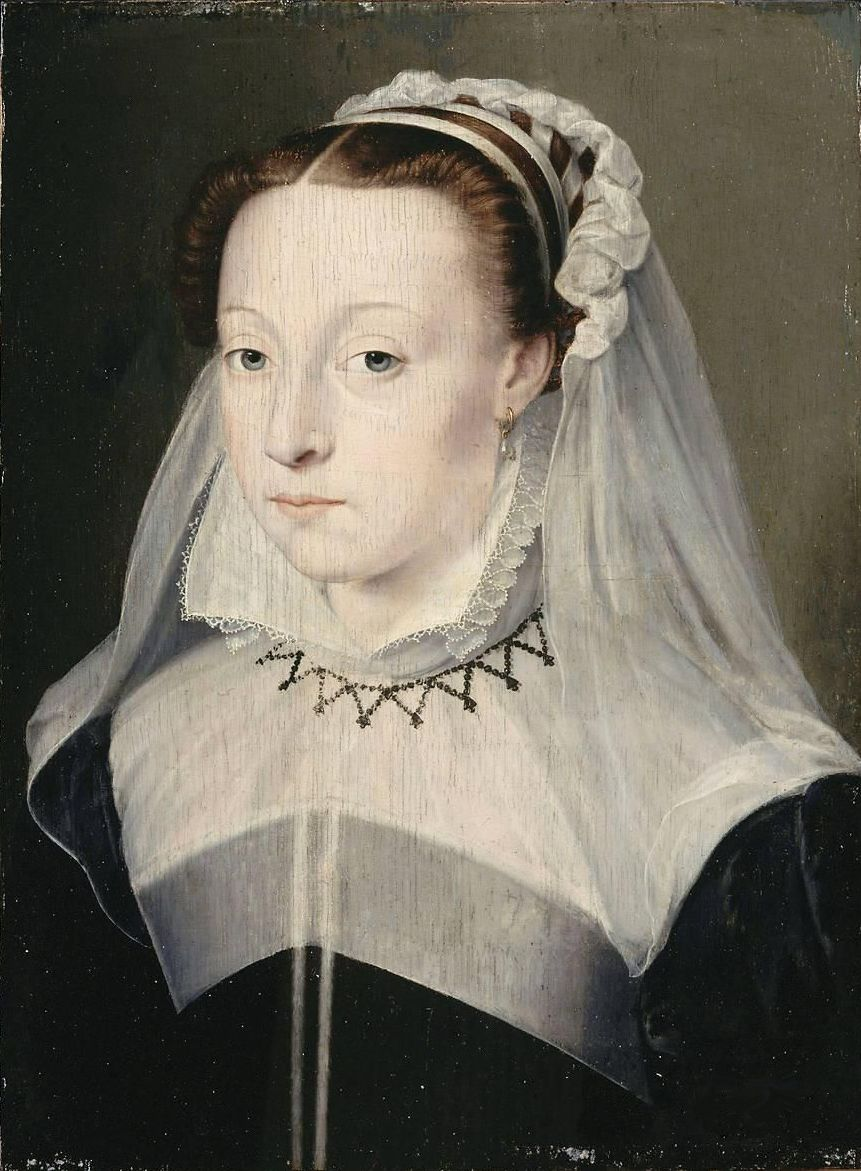
- Portrait by the workshop of François Clouet
- Born: 1553
- Died: 1574 (aged 20–21)
- Noble family: La Marck
- Spouse: Henri I de Bourbon, prince de Condé
- Issue: Catherine, Marquise d'Isles
- Father: Francis I of Cleves
- Mother: Margaret of Bourbon-Vendôme

Marie of Cleves or of Nevers (Marie de Clèves, Marie de Nevers; 1553–1574), by marriage the Princess of Condé, was the wife of Henry, Prince of Condé, and an early love interest of King Henry III of France.

Marie was the last child of Francis I of Cleves, Duke of Nevers, and Marguerite of Bourbon-Vendôme.

She was brought up by her aunt Queen Jeanne III of Navarre, who raised her as a Calvinist. In July 1572 she married in a Calvinist ceremony her first cousin, Henri I de Bourbon, prince de Condé, duc d'Enghien. A few months later, after the St. Bartholomew's day massacre, the couple had forcibly been converted to Roman Catholicism and remarried according to Catholic rites. When her husband fled the court and rejoined the Protestant cause, she refused and stayed behind at court remaining a Catholic the rest of her life.

Known for her beauty, Marie caught the eye of the young Henry, Duke of Anjou, the future Henry III of France, sometime before 1574. Upon ascending the throne later that year, Henry intended to procure Marie a divorce from her husband and marry her himself; however, Marie died before he could implement his plan. The Princess of Conde's cause of death has been historically recorded to have been lung infection from ongoing pneumonia.

Henri, Prince of Condé would go on to remarry Charlotte Catherine de La Trémoille (1568−1629), while the now King Henry III would mourn for several months and eventually marry Louise de Lorraine-Vaudémont, who greatly resembled Marie.

== Sources ==
- Boltanski, Ariane (2006). Les ducs de Nevers et l'État royal: genèse d'un compromis (ca 1550 - ca 1600) (in French). Librairie Droz. ISBN 978-2-600-01022-1.
- Women in power in 1570
