= Alix, Countess of Eu =

Countess of Eu

- Born: c. 1180
- Died: May 1246
- Burial place: La Mothe-Saint-Héray, France
- Spouse: Raoul I of Lusignan
- Children: Raoul II of Lusignan
- Father: Henry II, Count of Eu
- Relatives: Hamelin de Warenne, Earl of Surrey (grandfather), Isabel de Warenne, Countess of Surrey (grandmother)

Alix d'Eu or Alice of Eu (c. 1180 – May 1246) was ruling Countess of Eu from 1191 to 1246. She was the last ruler of the county of Eu from the House of Normandy.

== Biography ==
Alix was the daughter of Henry II, Count of Eu, and Matilda, daughter of Hamelin de Warenne, Earl of Surrey, and Isabel de Warenne. Alix inherited Eu and Hastings upon her father's death in 1191 as her older brothers had both died prematurely.

By 1191, Alix was married to Raoul I of Lusignan, Lord of Exoudun (died 1219), who became (through marriage with Alix: de jure uxoris) Count of Eu and Lord of Hastings. Alix and Raoul had several children, including:

- Raoul II de Lusignan, Count of Eu (born c. 1200 – died in 1250).
- Matilda Lusignan (c. 1210 – August 14, 1241), who married Humphrey de Bohun, 2nd Earl of Hereford, 1st Earl of Essex and Constable of England. She was buried at Llanthony, Gloucester.

Her husband died in 1219, and Alix traveled to England, apparently under an arrangement with Hubert de Burgh, 1st Earl of Kent, Justicar of England. Their relationship remains a mystery.

In a charter dated February 1233, Alix granted terram de Forz...ex eschæta Guillelmi quondam domini de Forz et comitis Aubemarle to Louis IX, King of France. It is unclear how Alix came to control Forz.

Alix was interred at La Mothe-Saint-Héray upon her death. The Counts of Eu continued through several generations of the House of Lusignan.

== Sources ==
- Pollock, Melissa A. (2015). Scotland, England and France After the Loss of Normandy, 1204-1296: Auld Amitie. Woodbridge: The Boydell Press. ISBN 9781843839927.
- Power, Daniel (2004). The Norman Frontier in the Twelfth and Early Thirteenth Centuries. Cambridge: Cambridge University Press. ISBN 9780521571722.
