= Tumulus of Bougon =

Tumulus in Bougon, France

- Les Chirons
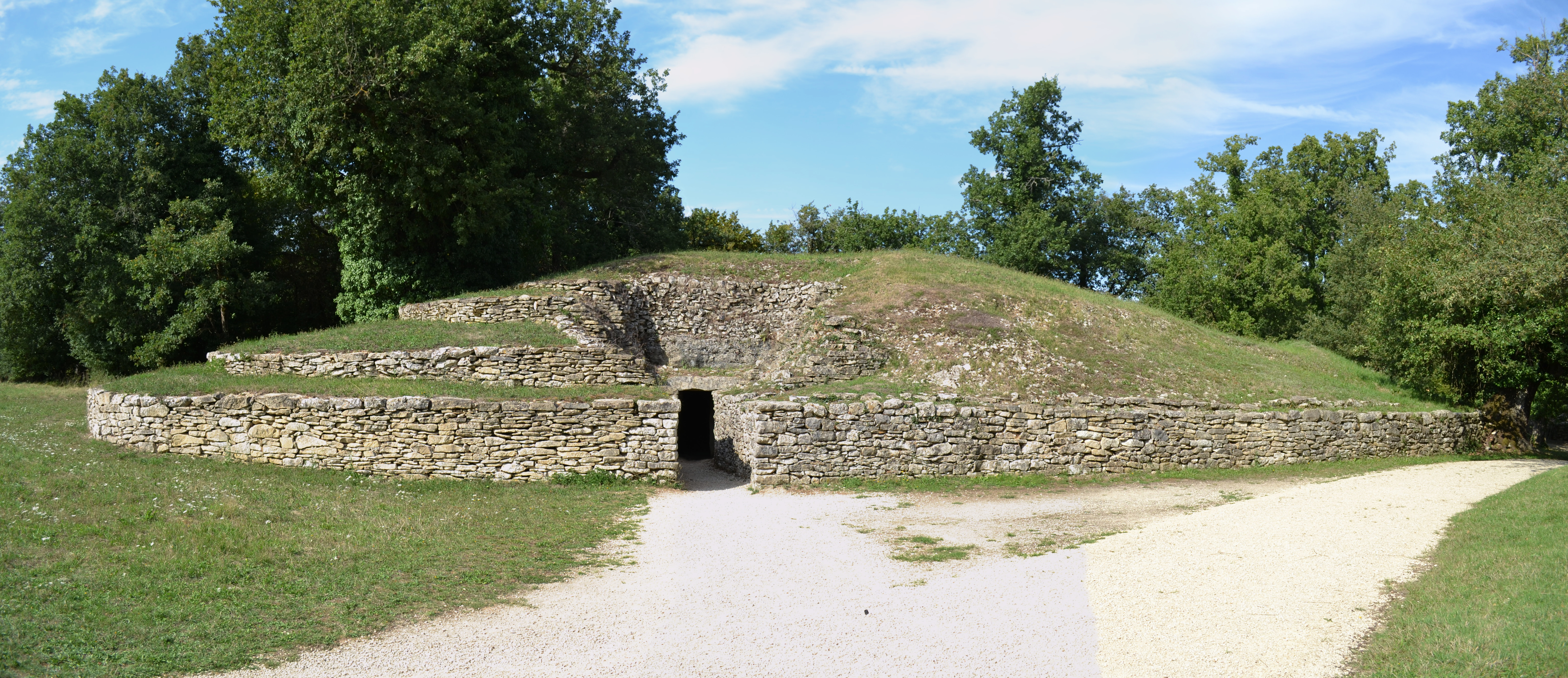
- Tumulus A, necropolis of Les Chirons Bougon, Deux-Sèvres, France

- Location of Bougon in France
- 46°22′24″N 0°03′59″W
- Type: Angoumoisin Tumulus
- Periods: Neolithic
- Cultures: Chasséen
- Location: valley of the River Bougon
- Region: Nouvelle-Aquitaine, France

Site notes
- Material: Limestone
- Elevation: 95 m (312 ft)
- Archaeologists: 1840 : Charles Arnault; 1968 : Claude Burnez; 1972 to 1987 : Jean-Pierre Mohen, Chris Scarre
- Public access: yes (guided tour only)
- Website: tumulus-de-bougon.fr

Monument historique
- Designated: 1960

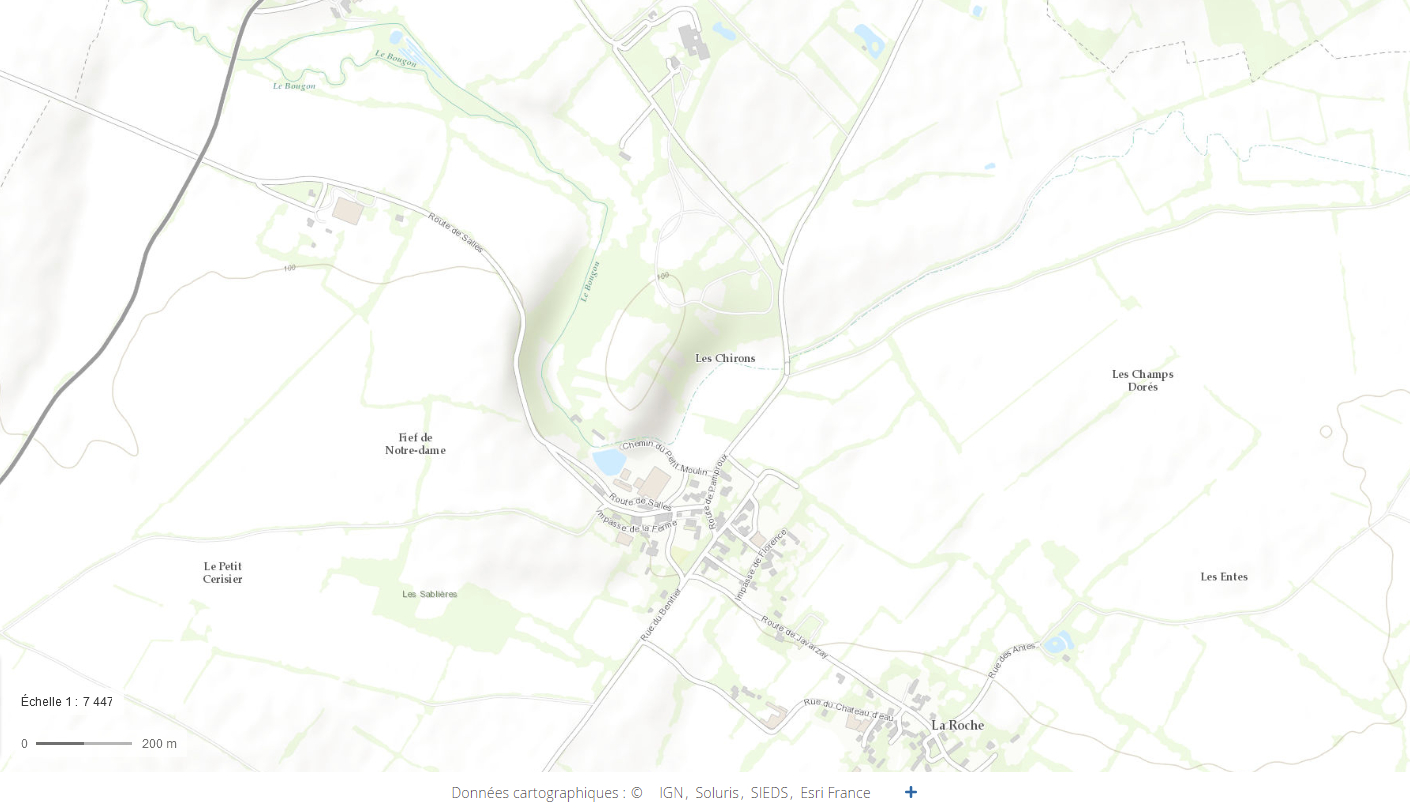
Map of the megalithic site, Les Chirons, Bougon: Esri World Topographic Map, from geoportail.gouv.fr

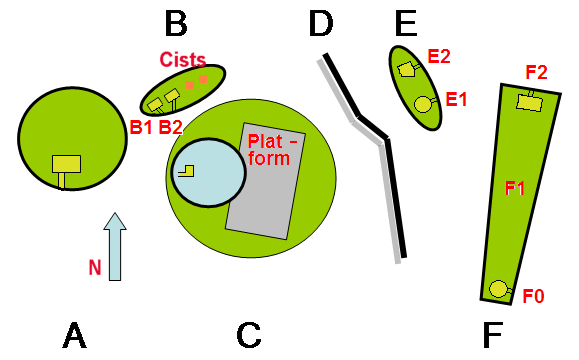
Plan of the Bougon complex

The Tumulus of Bougon or Necropolis of Bougon (French: "Tumulus de Bougon", "Nécropole de Bougon") is a group of five Neolithic barrows located in Bougon, near La-Mothe-Saint-Héray, between Exoudun and Pamproux in Nouvelle-Aquitaine, France.

Their discovery in 1840 raised great scientific interest. To protect the monuments, the site was acquired by the department of Deux-Sèvres in 1873. Excavations resumed in the late 1960s. The oldest structures of this prehistoric monument, called E1 and F0 date to 4800 BC.

== Archaeological site ==
The site is located on a limestone plateau within a loop of the river Bougon. The area used to be known as "Les Chirons".

=== Tumulus A ===
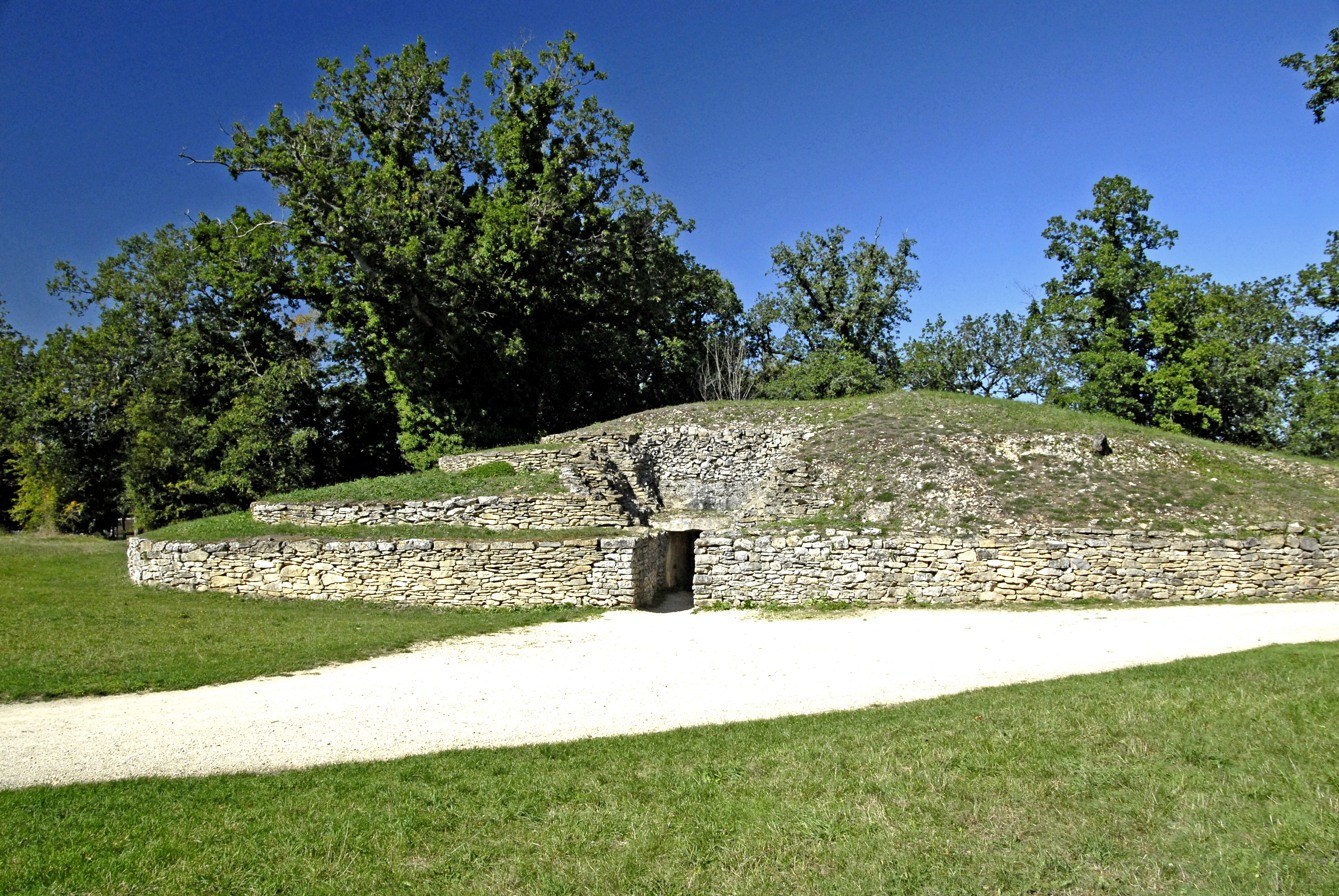
Tumulus A

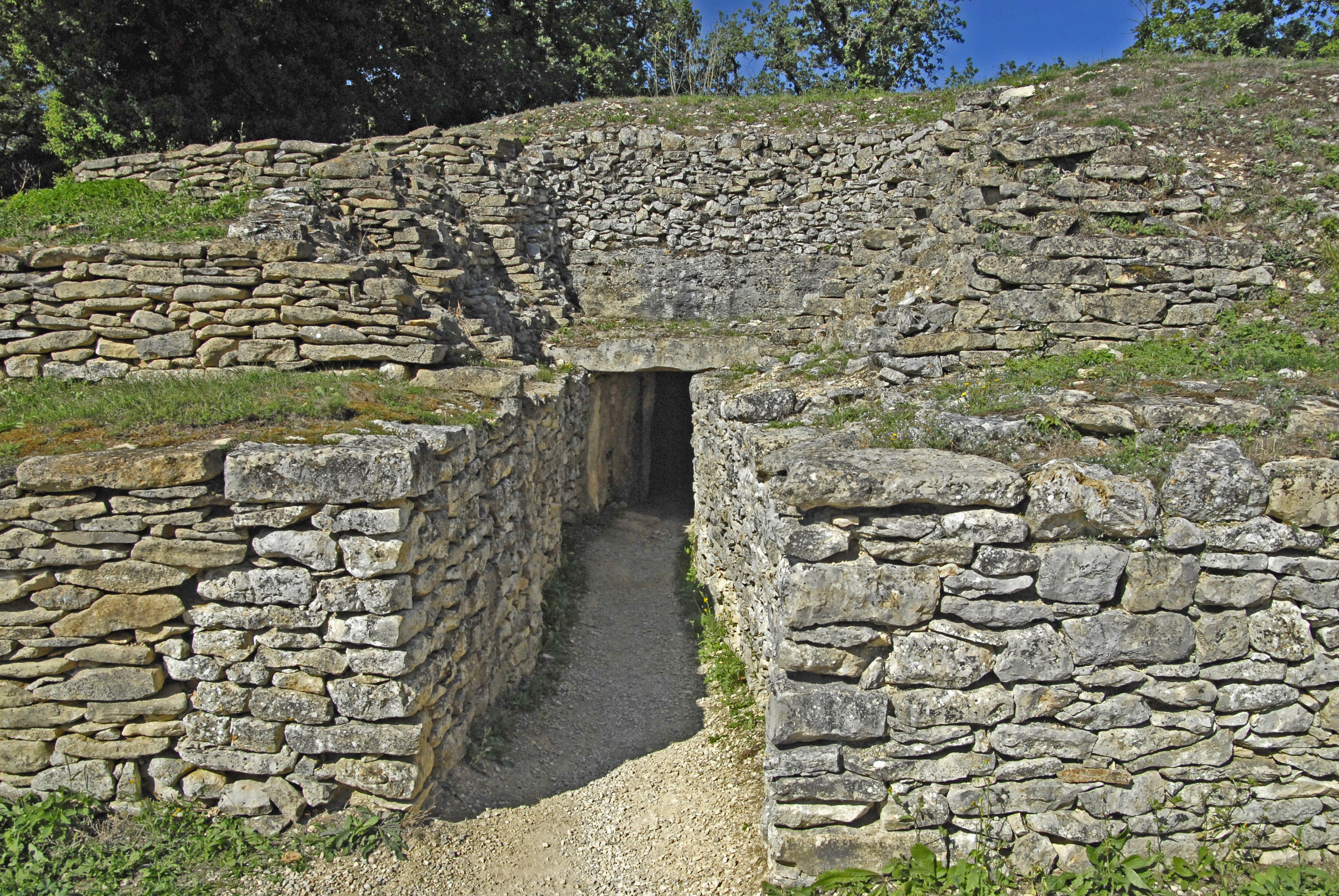
Tumulus A, entrance

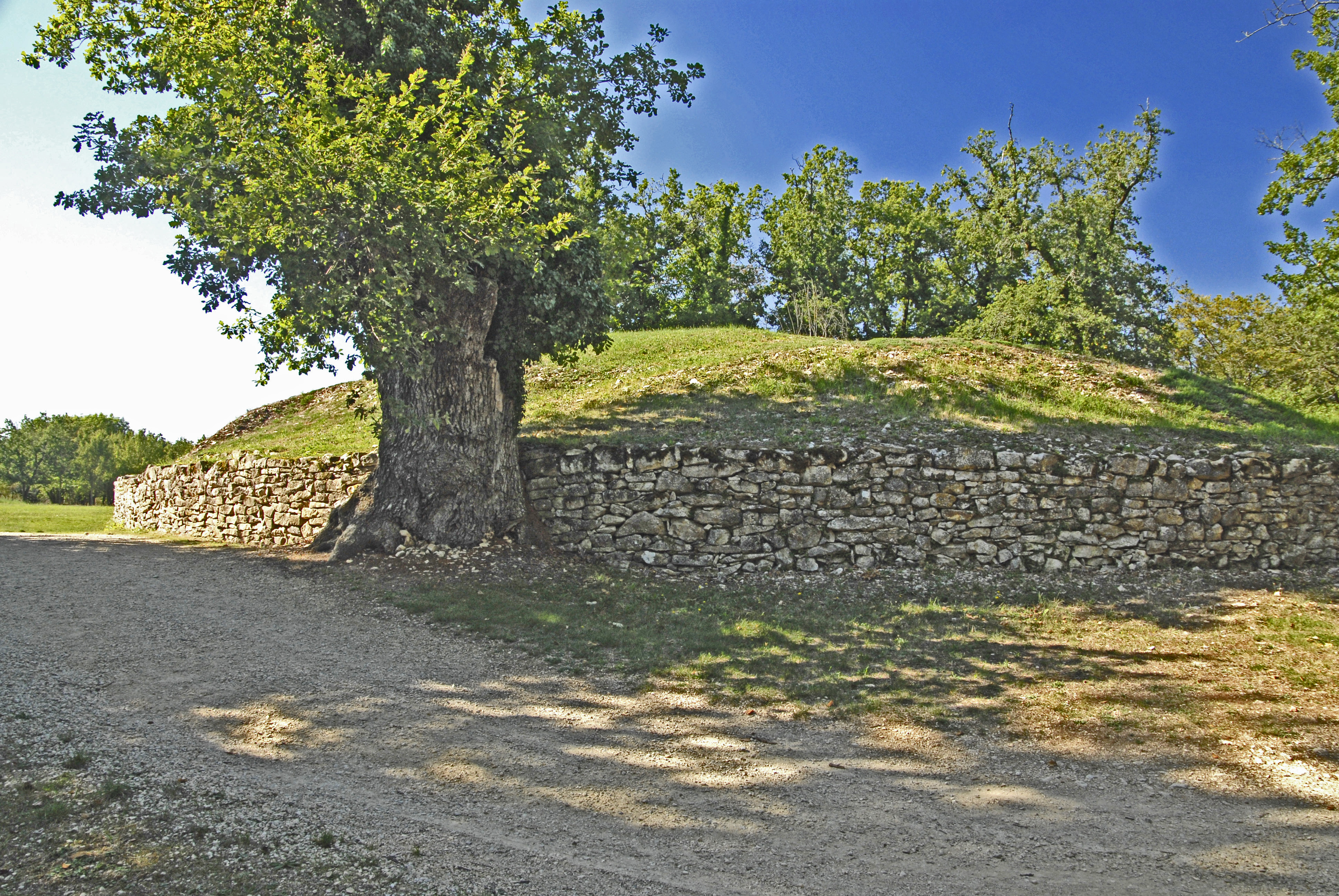
Tumulus A, rear

The stepped mound, erected in the early 4th millennium BC, has a diameter of 42 m and a maximum height of 5 m. Its large rectangular chamber (7.8 × 5 m, 2.25 m high) lies south of its centre. It is connected by a non-centrally placed passage. There is evidence that the passage was still used by the 3rd millennium BC. The chamber's walls contain artificially shaped orthostats, the gaps were filled with dry stone walling. The chamber is covered by a capstone which weighs 90 tons. It is supported by two monolithic pillars, which also serve to subdivide the chamber. Ammonite fossils, and some imprints of them, are visible in relief in the middle of these central orthostats.

During its excavation in 1840, about 200 skeletons were discovered in three layers, separated by stone slabs. The vague reports of that early excavation prevent any detailed chronological analysis. Accompanying finds included flat-bottomed and round-bottomed pottery, beads, pierced teeth, chains of seashells and stone tools, including a diorite mace. More recent excavations showed that the grave was abandoned shortly after its construction. The passage had been blocked with a large stone slab. At its base lay the skull of a man who had undergone three trepanations during his lifetime. Pottery was also found in front of the monument's facade, suggesting that cult activities, entailing the deposition of pottery, took place after its closure. About 1,000 years later, the monument was re-used for more burials by people of a different culture who reached the passage from above.

=== Tumulus B ===
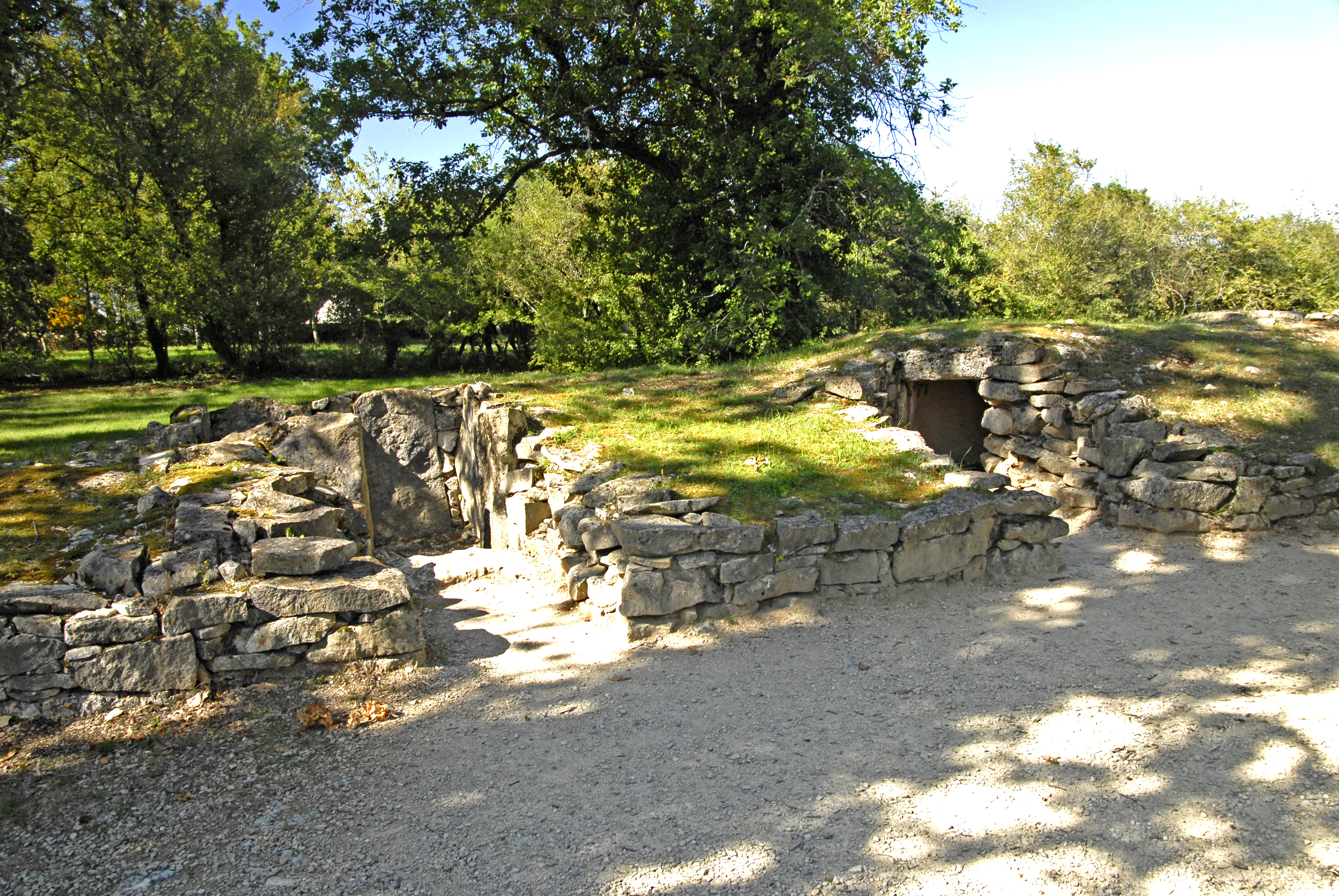
Tumulus B

Tumulus B is a long mound, 36 m long and 8 m wide. It has four chambers. Two of them are very small cists, with no access passage. The mound's west part has two larger rectangular chambers, each accessible via a passage from the south.

==== Chamber B1 ====
The chamber B1 is a small square structure, built from monolithic slabs. Such constructions are known as dolmen angoumoisin. A 2.2 m long passage leads to a chamber of 2 by 1.5 m, built simply from four wall slabs. One of them has a hook carved out of its side. A fifth slab covers the chamber. Little archaeological material was found in it, probably because it had been cleared and reused in the 3rd millennium BC.

==== Chamber B2 ====
Excavation here revealed a distinctive treatment of human remains. About ten skullcaps were found placed upside down in two rows. They were associated with several longbones.

==== Cists ====
The cists in the east part of the mound were discovered in 1978. Set in the centre of the mound, they were built of small stones. Both were empty, but they may possibly be associated with a large heap of Late Neolithic pottery sherds found nearby.

=== Tumulus C ===
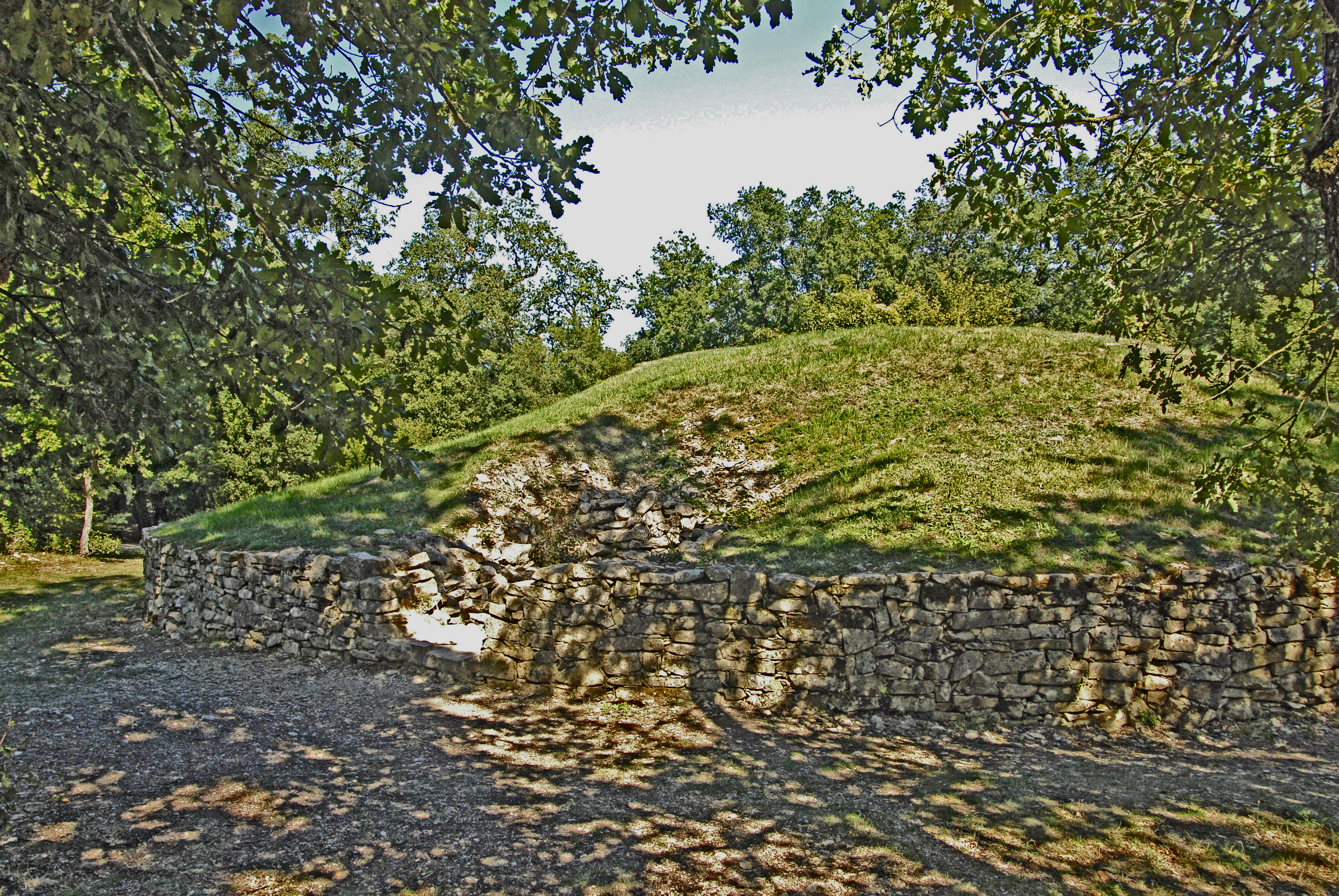
Tumulus C

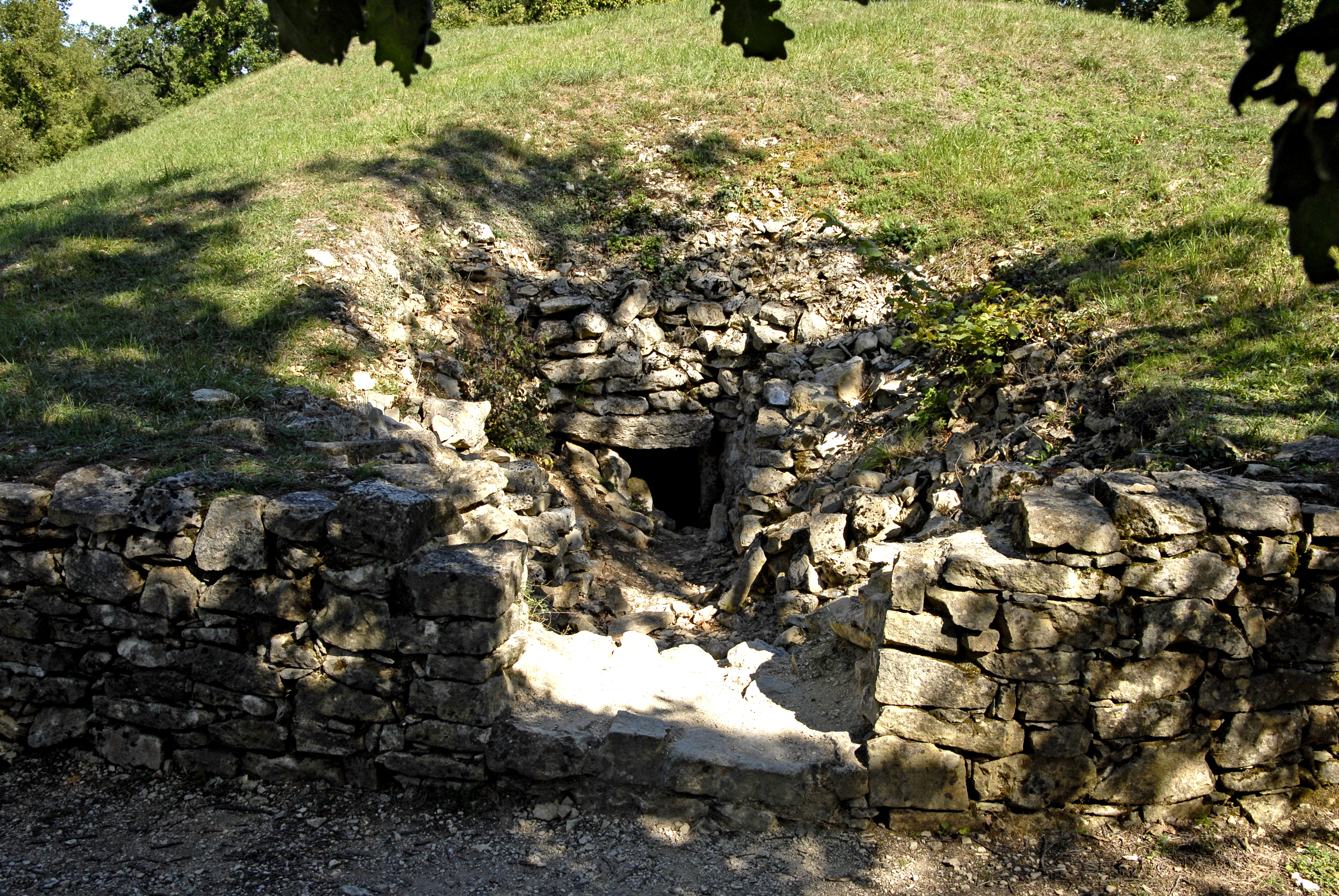
Tumulus C, entrance, partially obscured

This circular earthen mound with a diameter of 57 m and a height of 5 m is a complex structure. It reached its final shape through several phases. The mound covers two earlier monuments:

- a rectangular platform and
- a smaller circular mound.

==== Earlier mound ====
The earlier mound had a diameter of 24 m and a height of 4 m. It contained a small off-centre chamber (2 by 1.45 m), accessible by a passage from the west. Six slabs formed its floor. It contained four skeletons (including an old woman), as well as pottery and flint tools.

==== Platform ====
Attached to the east side of the earlier mound was a large platform, 20 m x 40 m in size (possibly an excarnation platform). In front of each of the three sides of its tall facade wall, a double burial of an adult and a child was found.

=== Structure D ===
A 35m long and 2 m tall drystone wall subdivides the Bougon complex in two zones, separating Tumuli E and F from the rest of the site.

Several finds, including a piece of wood, proved the Neolithic date of this feature, unparalleled among the megalithic monuments of France.

=== Tumulus E ===
This doubly stepped mound, 22m long and 10 m wide, has two chambers accessible by near-central passages from the east. Originally, the chambers were contained in separate circular mounds.

Tumulus E

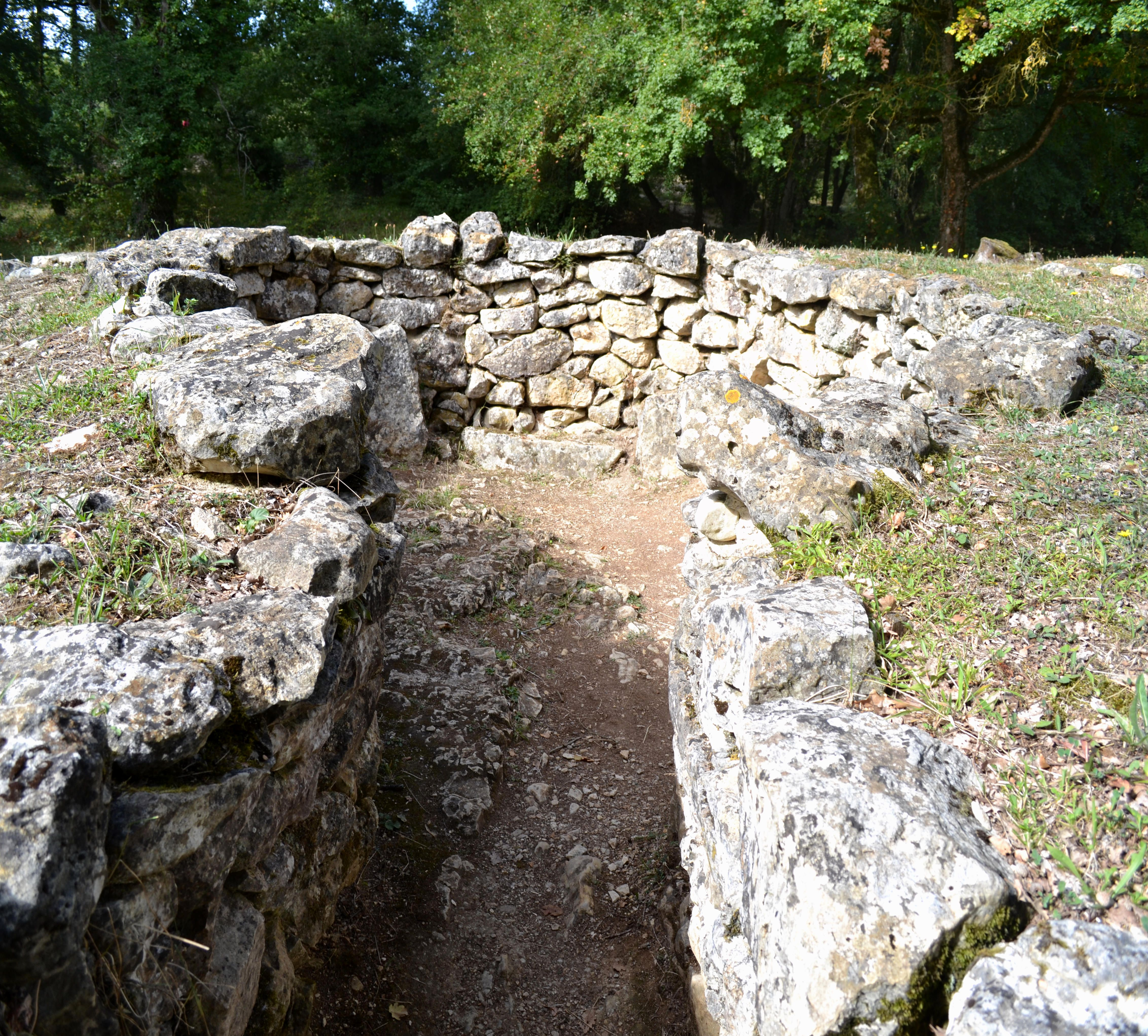
Circular chamber E1.

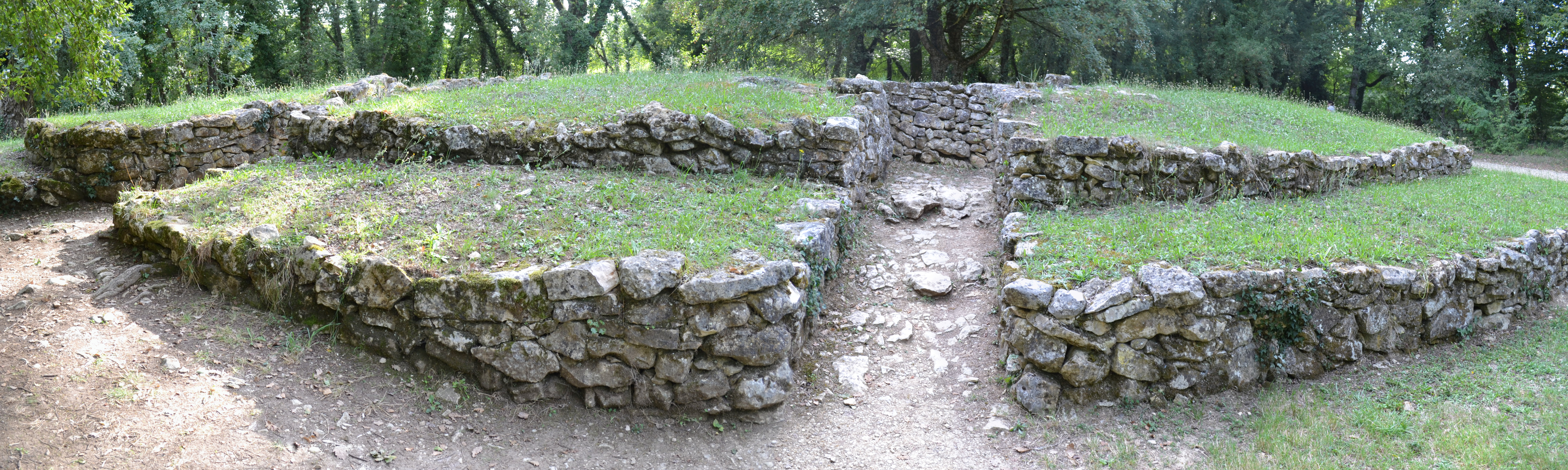
Chamber E1 on the left, chamber E2 on the right (distorted, curved view).

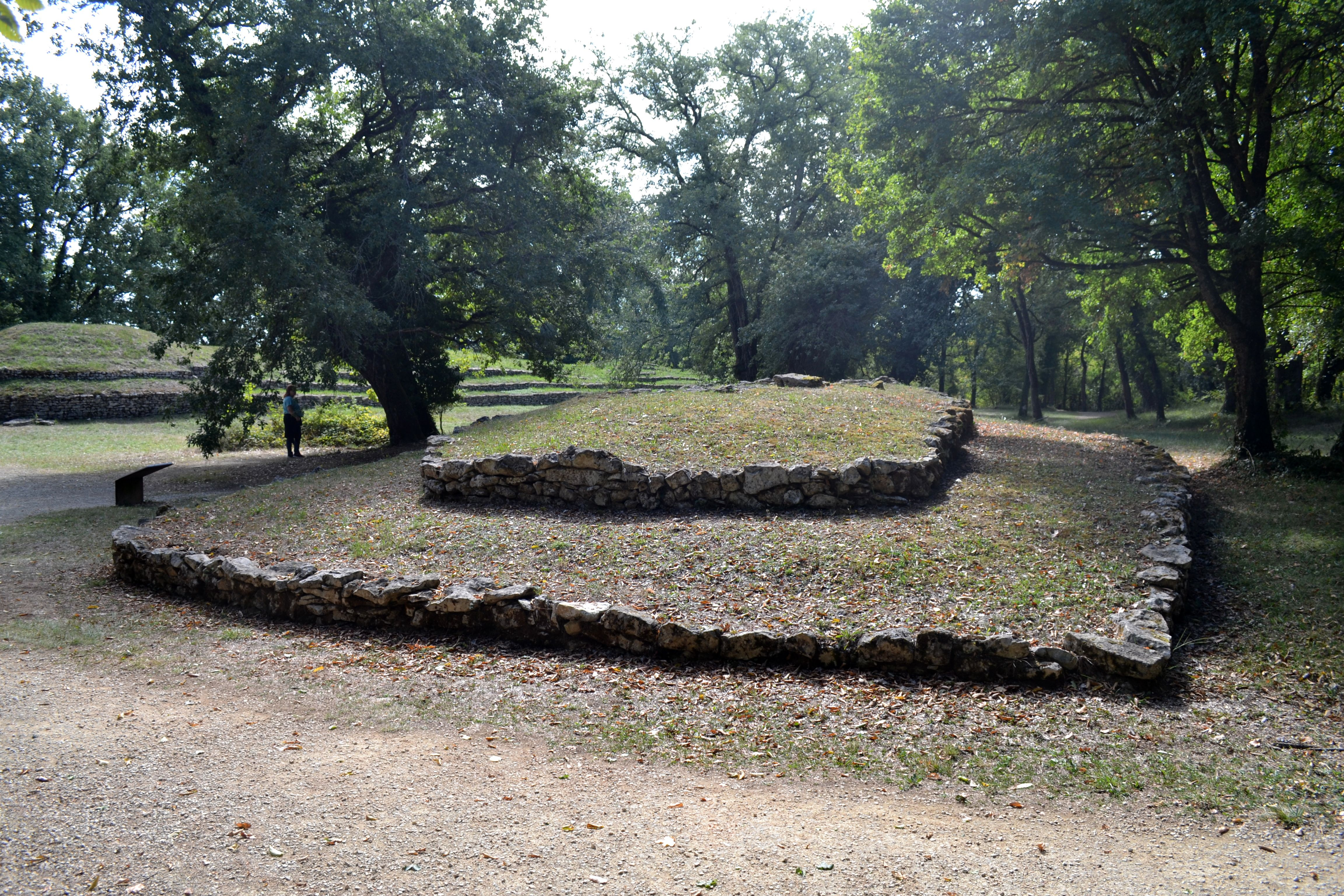
Tumulus E, seen from the north.

==== Chamber E1 ====
The southern chamber has a diameter of 3m and has a circular, tholos-like structure. Its foundation level is built with 11 blocks, set in a foundation trench. The construction is reminiscent of the chamber of a tumulus in Bazoges-en-Pareds (Vendée). Excavation revealed five or six skeletons, accompanied by pottery, bone tools and stone tools, dated to between 4,000 and 3500 BC, making it one of the most ancient dolmen structures in Central France.

==== Chamber E2 ====
E2, in the northern part of E, is near-square, with one apse-like side. It is suggested that it was altered around 2500 BC, long after it was erected. Materials from the chamber included arrowheads, knives and scrapers. Coarse round-bottomed pottery was also present.

=== Tumulus F ===
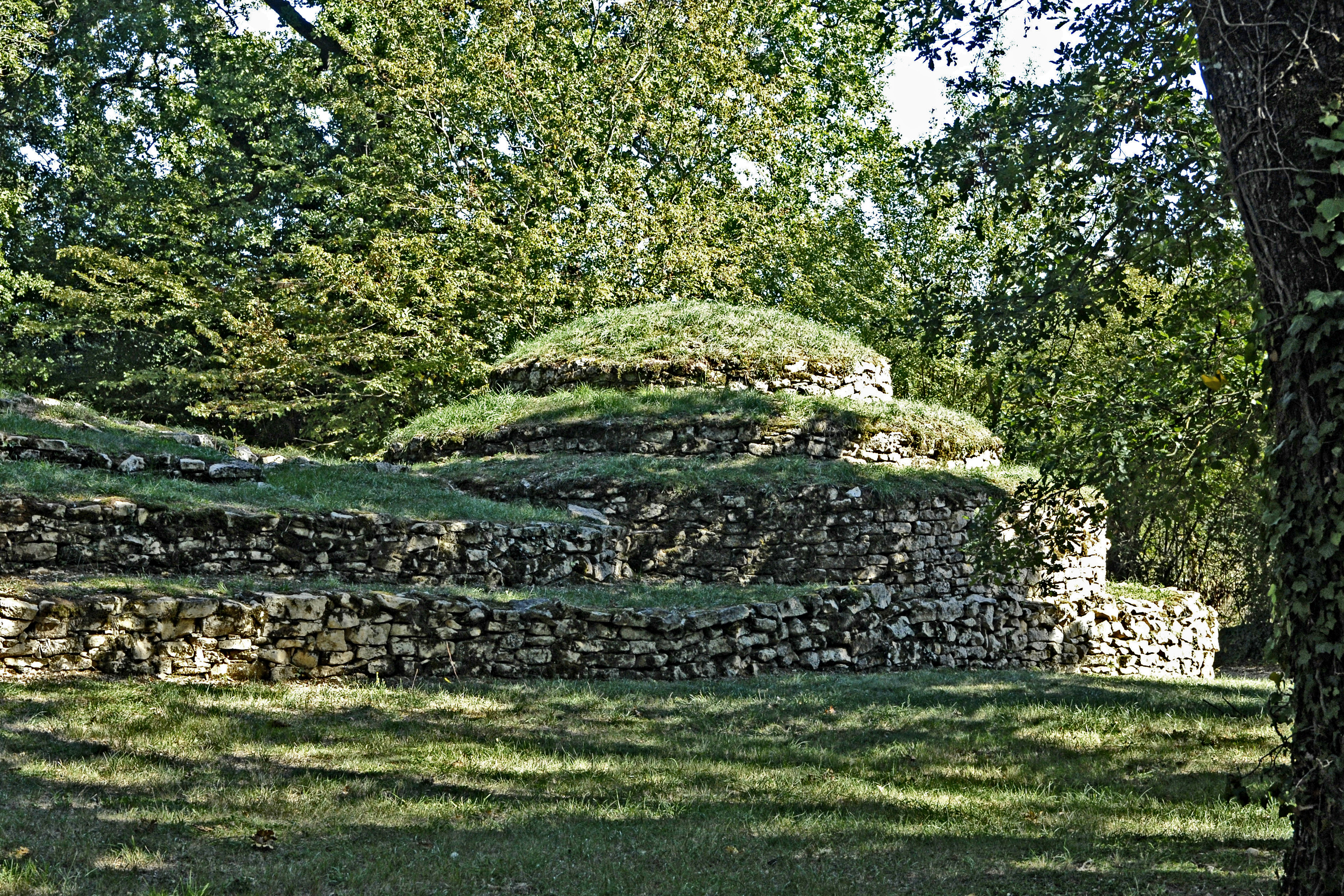
Tumulus F, elongated, with stepped mound at each terminal

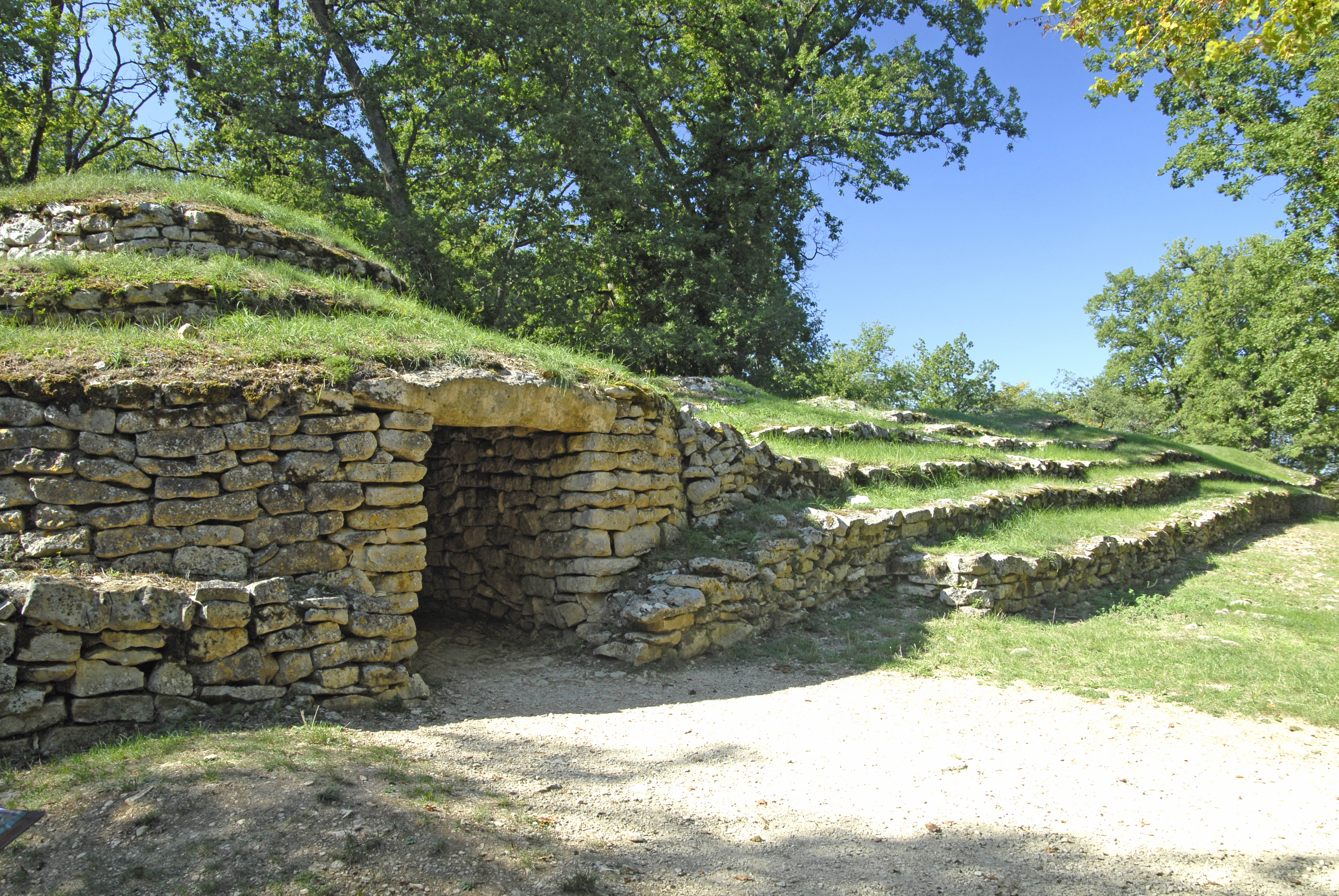
Tumulus F, other end

This trapezoidal long mound, 72 m long and 12 to 16 m wide, is the largest monument of the Bougon complex. Its west end abutted a pit that has been filled in since prehistory. The pit was the source of the material of which the mound (originally 3 m high) was built. The mound contains two chambers (F0 and F2), one at each end. Between them are seven different chamber-less structures (F1).

==== F0 ====
This monument was built in the first half of the 5th millennium BC and reused in the 3rd millennium BC. It is one of the oldest examples of monumental architecture in Atlantic France. Excavation in 1977 revealed a steep hemispherical mound containing a circular structure of 2.5 m in diameter. It lies within a triple concentric drystone facade and is covered with a corbelled vault. The architecture is similar to the complex of Er-Mané near Carnac in Brittany. The tomb, which dates from about 4700 BC, contained the unarticulated remains of about ten individuals, half of them children. A layer of red clay had been placed atop the natural floor level. There were few artifacts, mainly two pots, six bone chisels and some flint tools. They lay near the bones on two stones of around 30 cm height that protruded from the wall. The latter use was also associated with that structure.

==== F1 ====
The area known as F1 contains no burial chamber. It consists of a series of structures, some of them rectangular, that served to stabilise the monument. The walls separating them reach the ground level the tomb was built upon. The earth of the mound contained the remains of a man, a woman and a child.

==== F2 ====
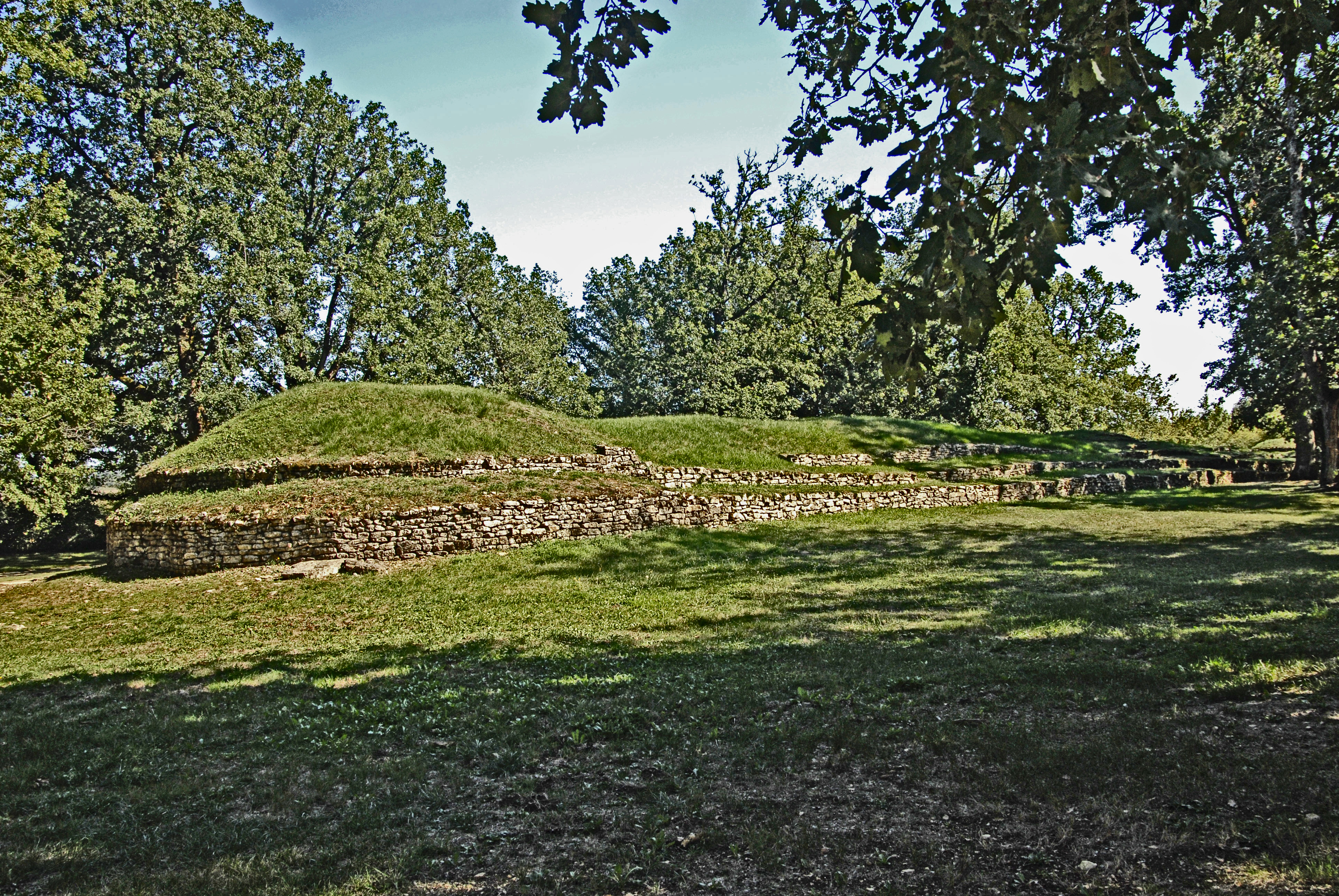
Tumulus F2

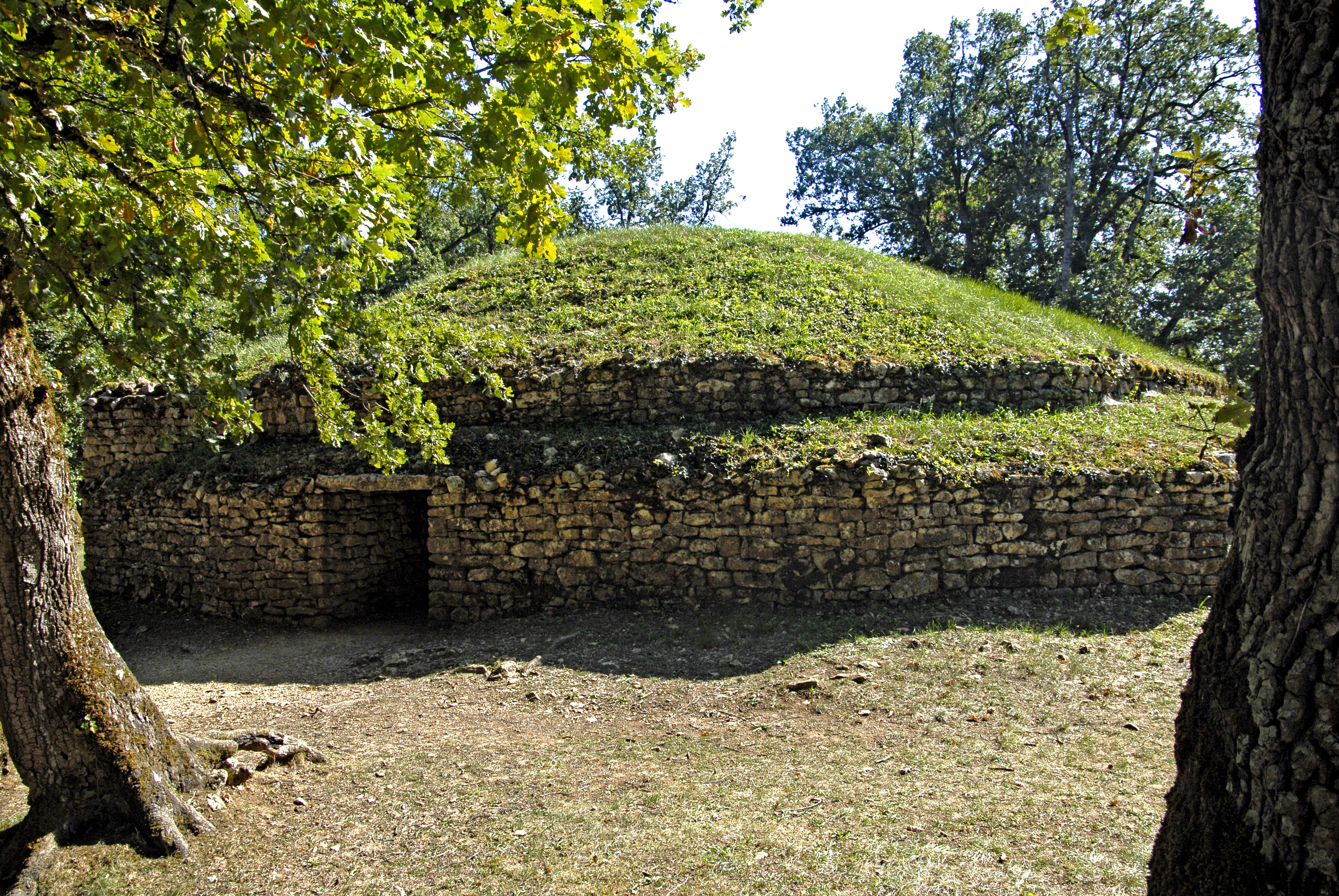
Tumulus F2

This chamber, dated to the early 4th millennium BC, is at the north end of monument F. It also underwent reuse in the 3rd millennium BC. The chamber, approximately 5 m by 2 m, is covered by a 32-ton slab, made from a type of stone available near Exodoun, 4 km away. The scarce finds from the chamber included pottery fragments, some unusual jewellery (beads) and flint tools.

=== Synopsis ===
The 1,000-year development of architecture at Bougon can be subdivided in three phases:

1. round or oval mounds with corbel-vaulted chambers
2. elongated mounds with small rectangular megalithic chambers
3. large rectangular megalithic chambers

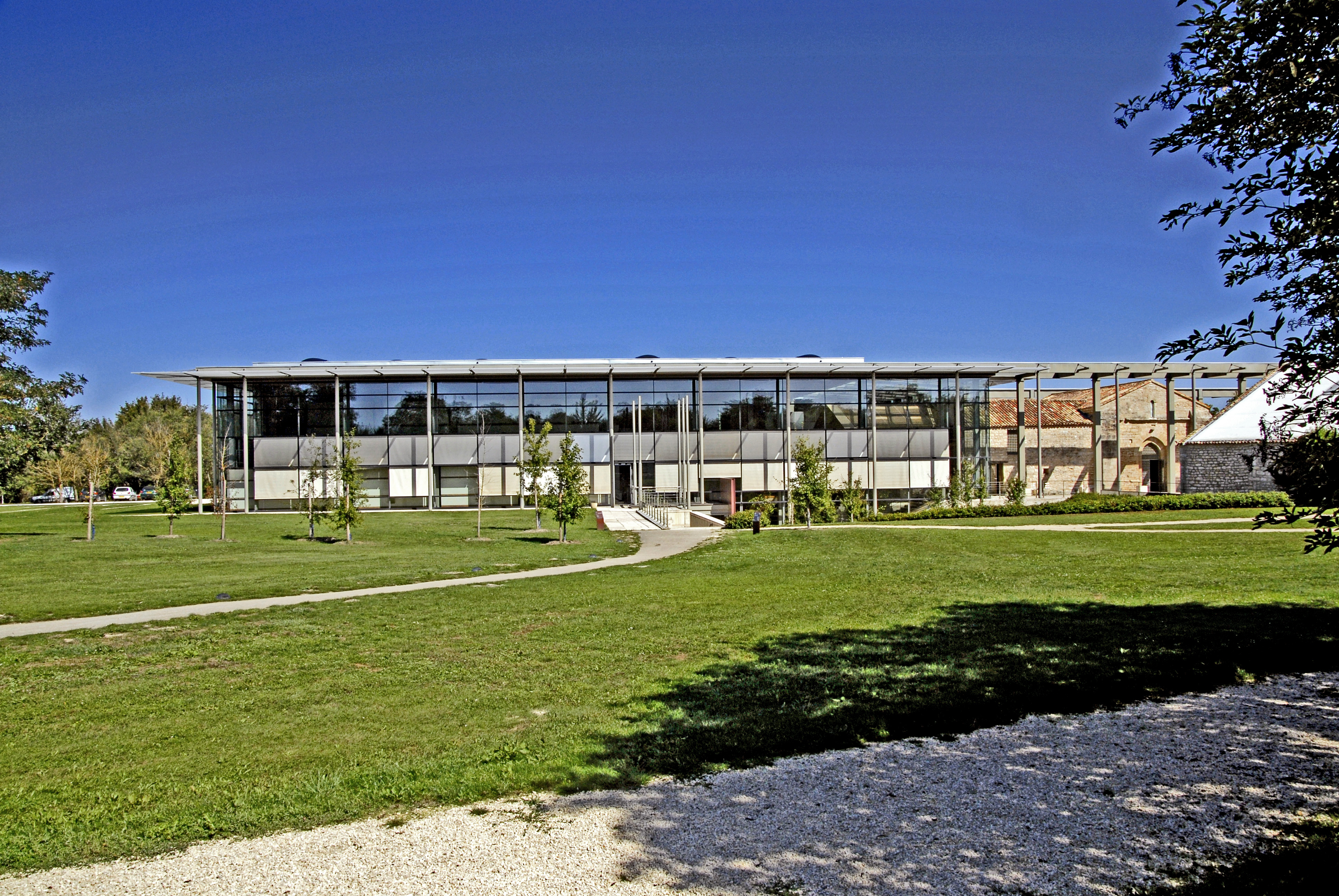
The Bougon Museum

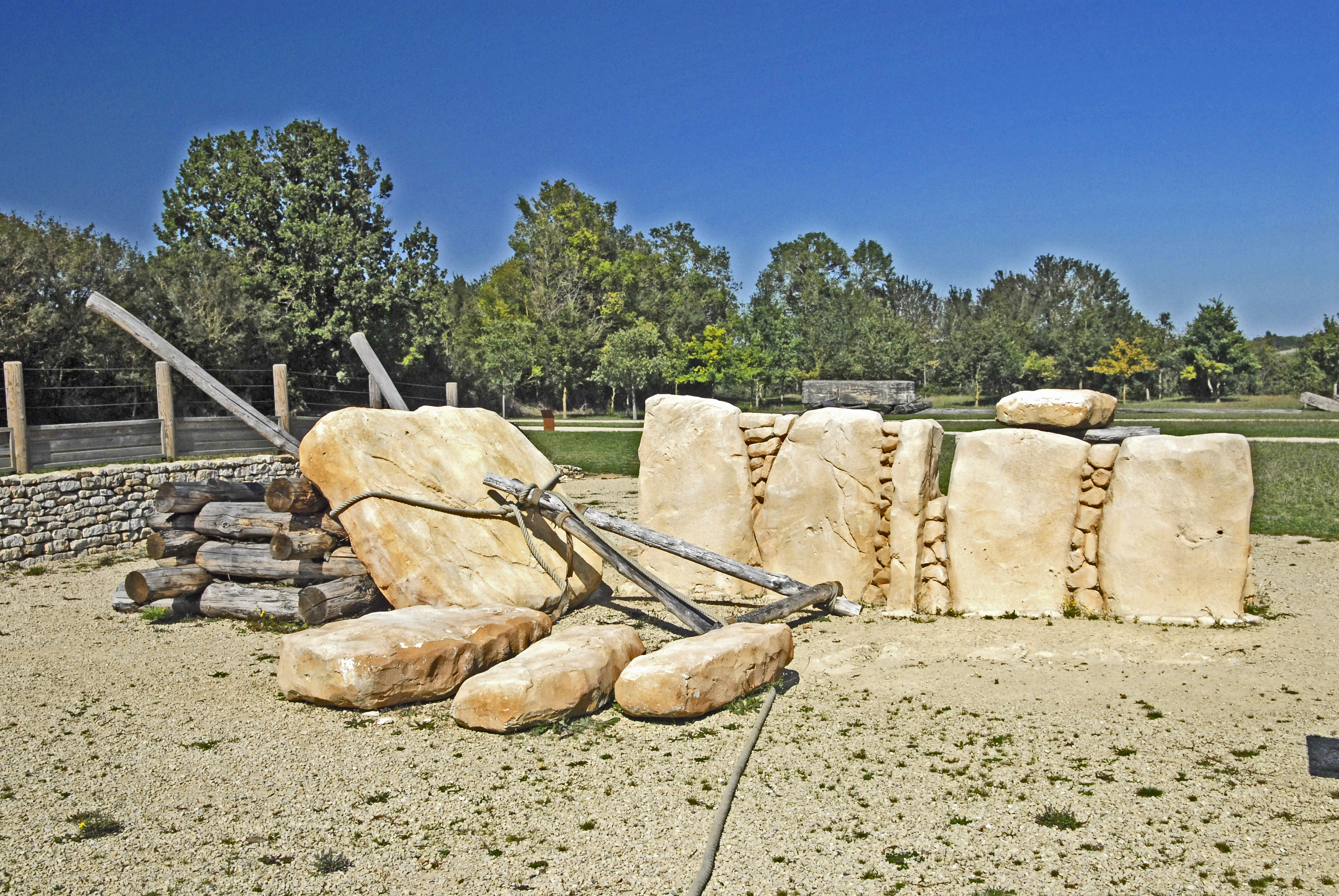
Display illustrating megalith-building technology

== Bougon Museum ==
The Bougon Museum, opened in 1993, is a modern structure, incorporating an ancient farmhouse. The exhibition is focused on prehistory in general and the Neolithic in particular.

It includes the excavated material from the site, but also replicas of a room in the Neolithic settlement of Çatalhöyük (Turkey) and of the passage tomb art from Gavrinis (Brittany).

The museum also has an outside area with displays of experimental archaeology, including reconstructions concerned with prehistoric methods for the transport and construction of megalithic monuments.

Museum rooms: Bougon necropolis and Neolithic sites of Deux-Sèvres

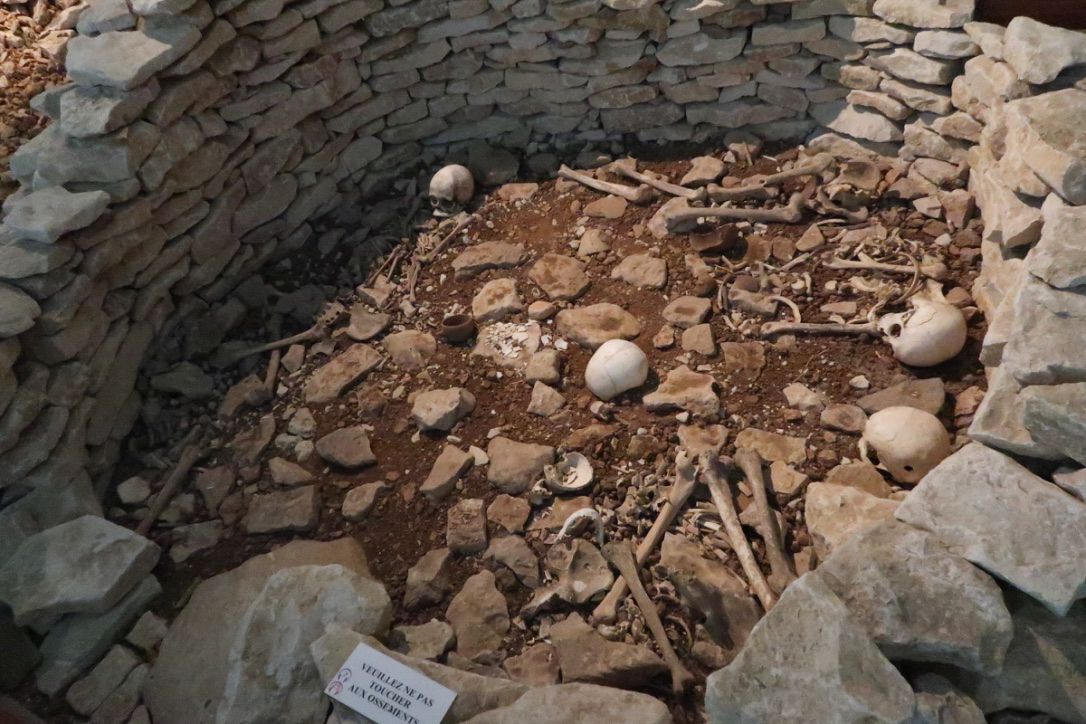
Skull having been trephined three times, corridor of tumulus A, upper level, 4th millennium.

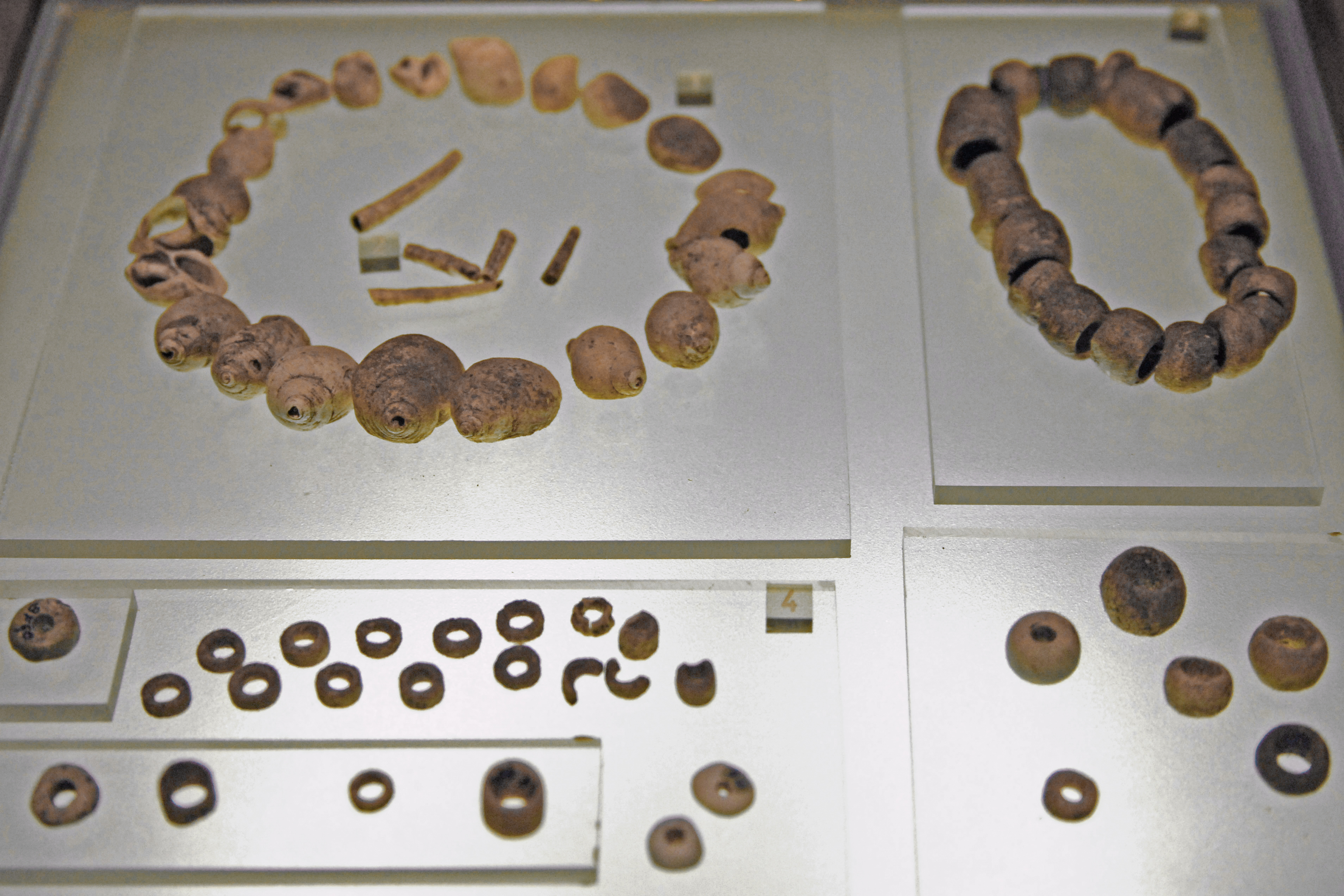
Perforated shells, limestone and variscite pearls. Tumulus A, upper level, 4th millennium.

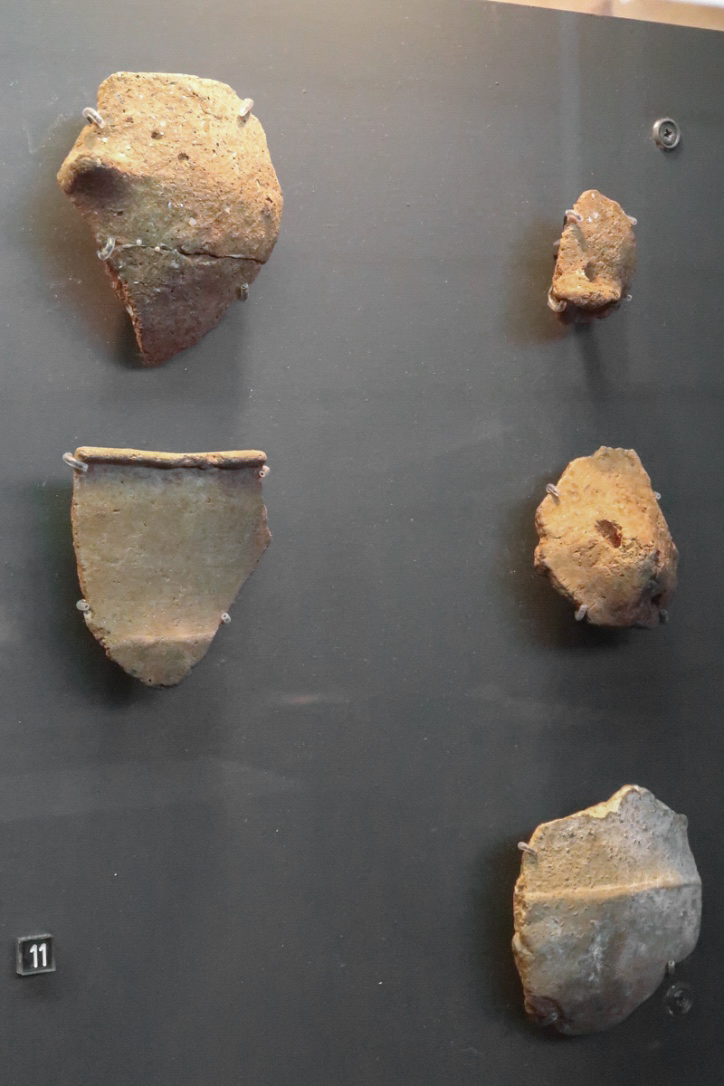
Shards, Middle Neolithic. Tumulus A dolmen II. Set of Atlantic Chasséen type ceramics.

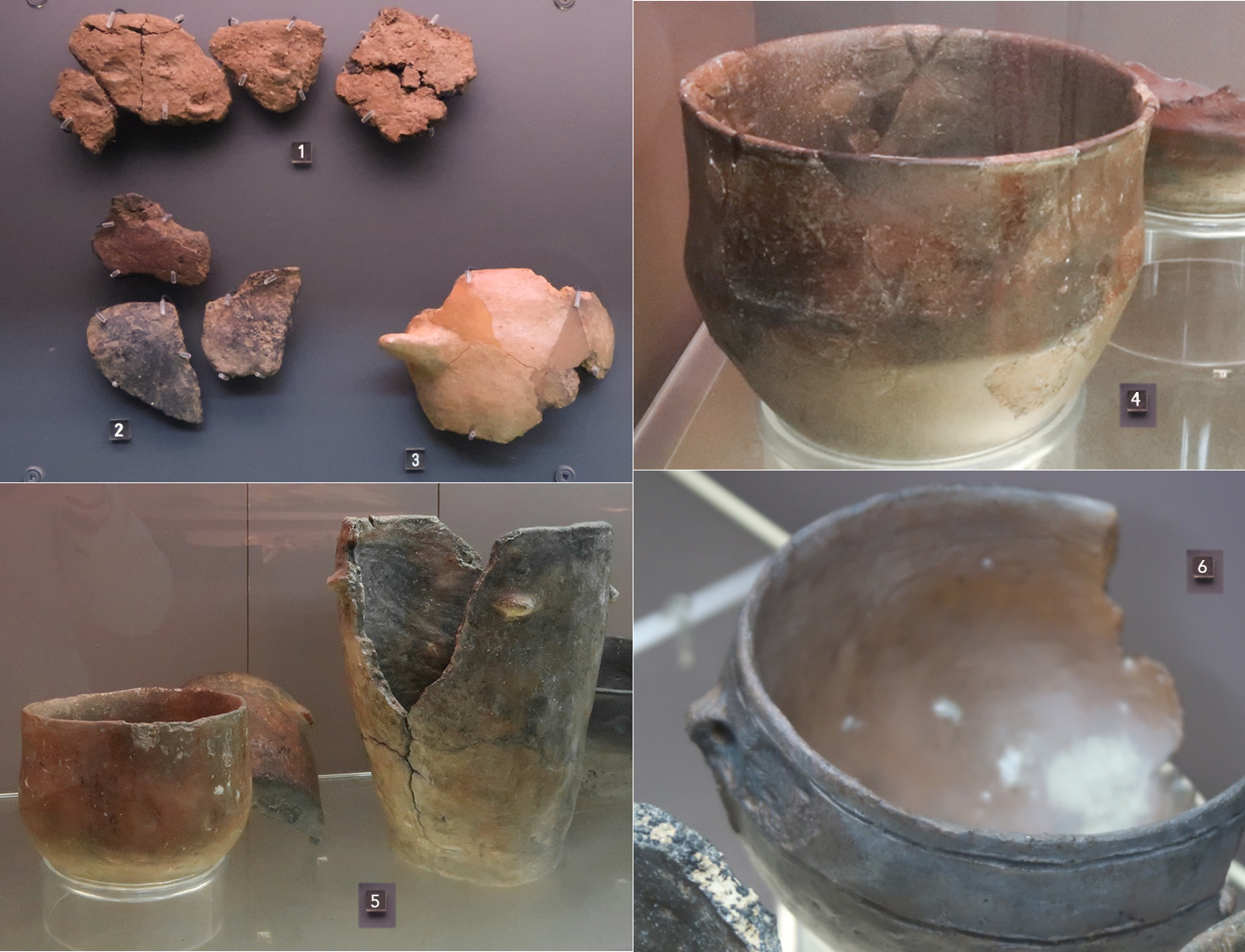
Ceramics, Bougon necropolis. Early and middle Neolithic, 5th millennium: 1, 2, 3. Late Neolithic, late 4th millennium: 4, 5, 6.

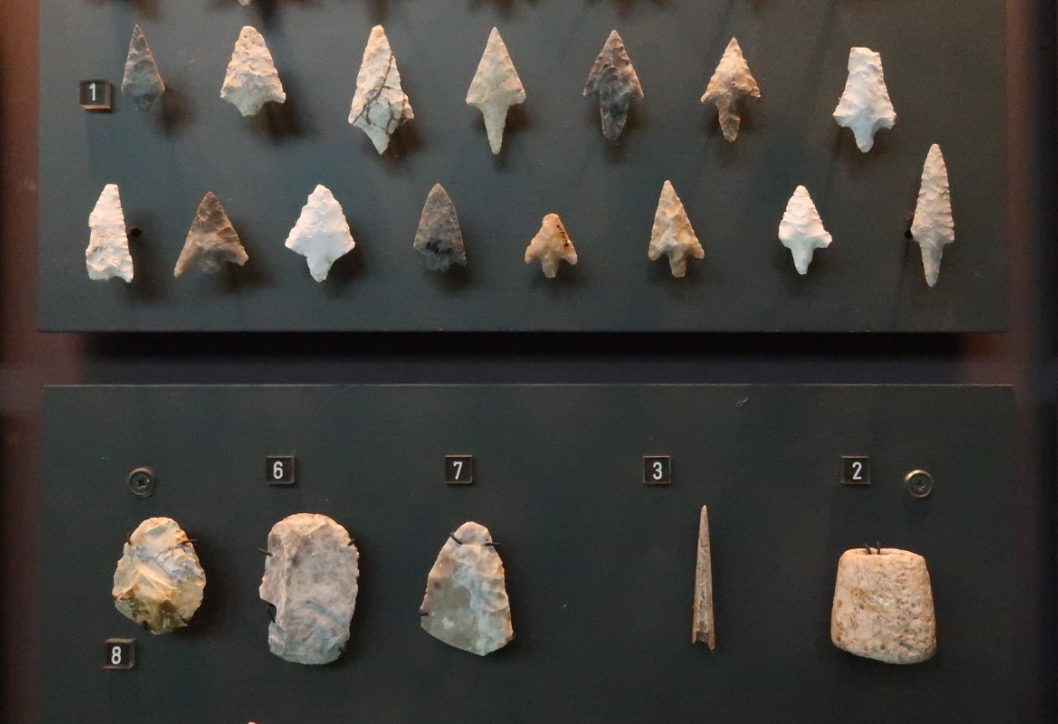
Late Neolithic tools, scale: height of a number: 0.39 in. Montabout tumulus, Pamproux (Deux-Sèvres).

== See also ==
- Necropolis of Monpalais (in french)
- Tumulus du Péré (in french)
- List of megaliths (in french) in Deux-Sèvres
- List of oldest known surviving buildings
- Megaliths
- Barnenez

== Bibliography ==
- Joussaume R., Laporte L.; Scarre C.: Longs tumulus néolithiques et organisation de l'espace dans l'ouest de la France.
- Mohen J.-P.: Le Site Megalithique de Bougon (Deux-Sèvres) – les Aspects Symboloiques et Sacrés de la Nèkropole. In Probleme der Megalithgräberforschung – Vorträge zum 100. Geburtstag von Vera Leisner. Madrider Forschungen 16 p. 73–81
- Pingel V. Megalithgruppen und ihre archäologische Differenzierung – ein Rückblick. In: Beinhauer K. W. et al. (Hrsg.): Studien zur Megalithik – Forschungsstand und ethnoarchäologische Perspektiven. p. 37–50 1999
