= Henry II of Eu =

Henry II, Count of Eu (died 1191), son of John, Count of Eu and Lord of Hastings, and Alice d'Aubigny. Henry inherited the countship of Eu and lordship of Hastings upon the death of his father (1170).

Henry married Matilda, daughter of Hamelin de Warenne, Earl of Surrey, and Isabel de Warenne, 4th Countess of Surrey. Henry and Matilda had:

- Raoul of Eu (d. 1 May 1186)
- Guy of Eu (d. 1185)
- Alix, Countess of Eu, married in 1213 to Raoul I of Lusignan who became Count of Eu
- Jeanne of Eu.

Upon the death of Henry, his daughter became Countess of Eu and Lady of Hastings. Henry was buried at Foucarmont.

== Sources ==
- Crouch, David (2005). The Birth of Nobility: Constructing Aristocracy in England and France, 900-1300. Pearson Education Limited.
- Pollock, M. A. (2015). Scotland, England and France After the Loss of Normandy, 1204-1296. The Boydell Press.
- Power, Daniel (2004). The Norman Frontier in the Twelfth and Early Thirteenth Centuries. Cambridge University Press.
