= Raoul I of Lusignan =

Nobleman from Poitou (c. 1160/5–1219)

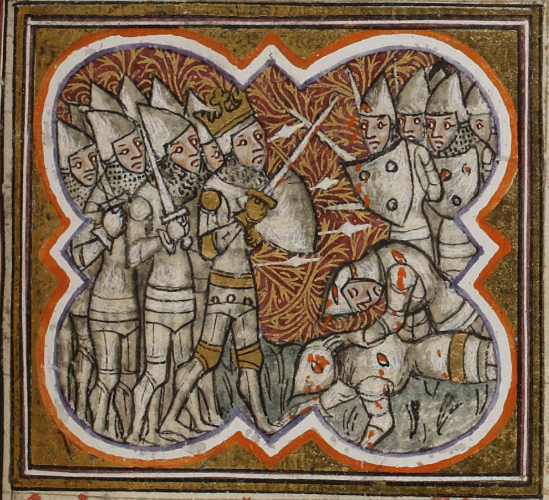
Medieval illustration of the Battle of Bouvines (1214)

Raoul I of Lusignan (born c. 1160/5 – Melle, 1 May 1219) was the second son of Hugh de Lusignan (died 1169) and the grandson of Hugh VIII of Lusignan. He was a prominent nobleman in the region of Poitou, and lord (seigneur) d'Exoudun, de Melle, de Chizé, de Civray and de La Mothe. He also became Count of Eu (c. 1191), by marriage (de jure uxoris) to Alix d'Eu. Since the region of Poitou was contested between kings of France and England, local nobility was often changing sides. Up to 1201, Raoul was loyal to kings of England, but then changed his allegiance to king of France. He later rejoined the English side, and took part in the Battle of Bouvines (1214). For his services to the king England, he was granted possession of Hastings and Tickhill, in 1216. Earlier, he participated, as a young knight, in the Third Crusade, and later again in the Fifth Crusade, and died upon return. He was buried at the Priory of Fontblanche, in Exoudun.

== Family ==
By 1191, Raoul married a young noblewoman Alix d'Eu, heiress of the County of Eu (born c. 1180 – La Mothe-Saint-Heray, Poitou, May 1246).

They had several children, including:

- Raoul II de Lusignan, Count of Eu (c. 1200 – 1246)
- Matilda de Lusignan (c. 1210 – 14 August 1241), who married Humphrey de Bohun, 2nd Earl of Hereford, 1st Earl of Essex and Constable of England. She was buried at Llanthony, Gloucester. They were ancestors to Queen Catherine Parr.

As lord of Exoudun, he is known as: Raoul d'Exoudun, and should not be confused with a contemporary nobleman, Raoul of Issoudun (Raoul d'Issoudun), who was married to Margaret of Courtenay.

== See also ==
- French invasion of Normandy (1202–1204)
- Anglo-French War (1213–1214)

== Bibliography ==
- Jourdain, Charles; Delisle, Léopold; Wailly, Natalis de, eds. (1894). Recueil des Historiens des Gaules et de la France. Vol. 23. Paris: H. Welter.
- Painter, Sidney (1955). "The Houses of Lusignan and Chatellerault 1150-1250". Speculum. 30 (3): 374–384. doi:10.2307/2848076. JSTOR 2848076. S2CID 162997835.
- Pollock, Melissa A. (2015). Scotland, England and France After the Loss of Normandy, 1204-1296: Auld Amitie. Woodbridge: The Boydell Press. ISBN 9781843839927.
- Power, Daniel (2004). The Norman Frontier in the Twelfth and Early Thirteenth Centuries. Cambridge: Cambridge University Press. ISBN 9780521571722.
- Richardson, Douglas (2011) [2004]. Plantagenet Ancestry: A Study in Colonial and Medieval Families (2nd ed.). Baltimore: Genealogical Publishing Company. ISBN 9781461045137.
