= Raoul II of Lusignan =

Raoul II of Lusignan (c. 1200 – c. September 1, 1246, buried at the Abbey of Foucarmont) was the son of Raoul I of Lusignan and his wife Alix, Countess of Eu. He became Seigneur d'Exoudun and Count of Eu upon his father’s death in 1219.

He was married first in 1222 to Jeanne de Bourgogne (1200 – 1223, buried at the Abbaye de Foncarmont), daughter of Odo III, Duke of Burgundy.

His second wife, whom he married after 1223, was Yolande of Dreux (1196 – October 16, 1239), daughter of Robert II; their daughter, his only surviving child, was Marie, Countess of Eu.

Raoul's third wife was Philippe of Dammartin.

== Sources ==
- Adamo, Phillip C. (2014). New Monks in Old Habits: The Formation of the Caulite Monastic Order, 1193-1267. Pontifical Institute of Mediaeval Studies.
- Jourdain, Charles; Delisle, Léopold; Wailly, Natalis de, eds. (1894). Recueil des Historiens des Gaules et de la France. Vol. 23. Paris: H. Welter.
- Painter, Sidney (1955). "The Houses of Lusignan and Chatellerault 1150-1250". Speculum. 30 (3): 374–384. doi:10.2307/2848076. JSTOR 2848076. S2CID 162997835.
- Pollock, Melissa A. (2015). Scotland, England and France After the Loss of Normandy, 1204-1296: Auld Amitie. Woodbridge: The Boydell Press. ISBN 9781843839927.
