= Exoudun =

- Commune
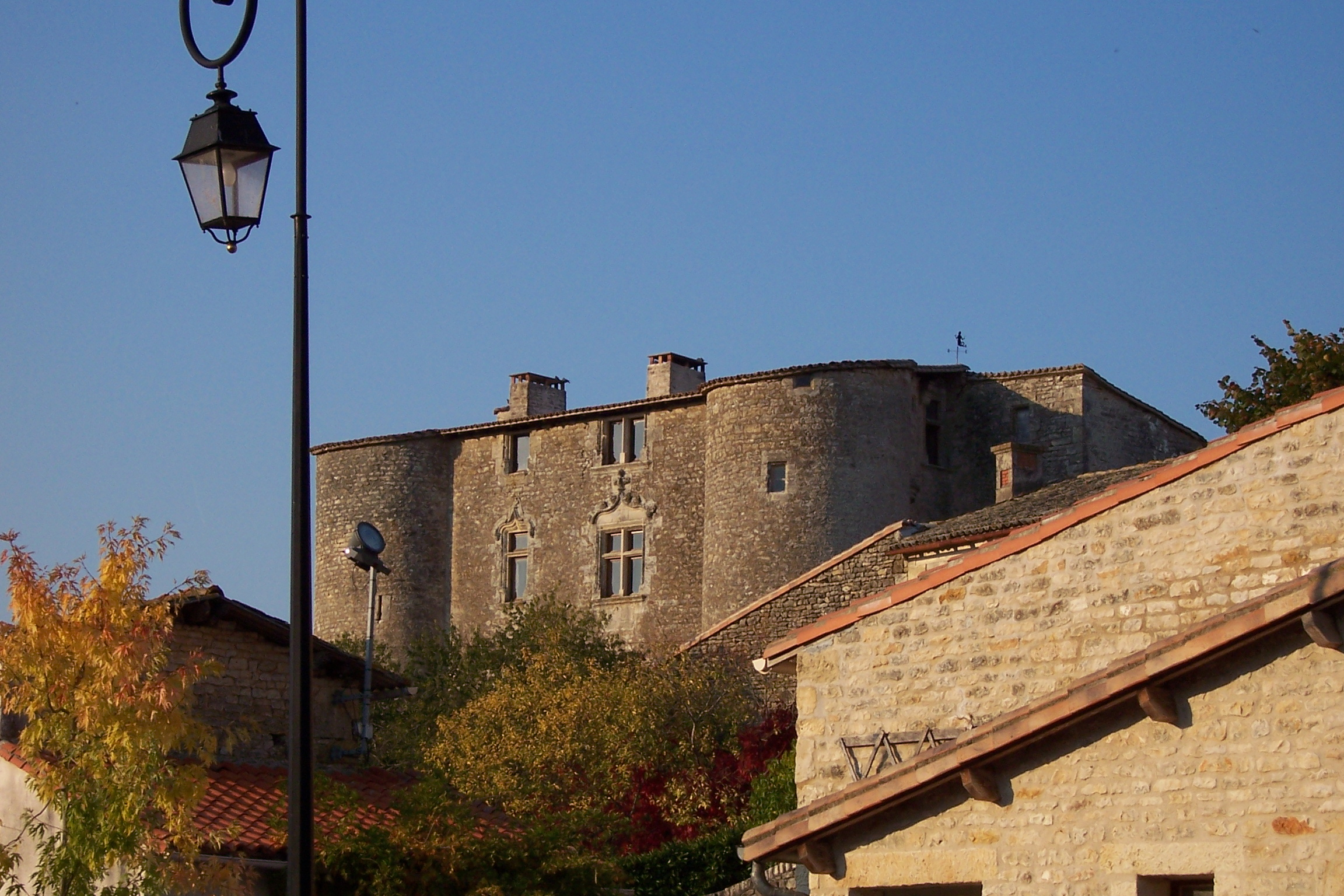
- The fortified house in Exoudun

- Coat of arms
- Location of Exoudun
- Location within France Location within Nouvelle-Aquitaine
- Coordinates: 46°20′43″N 0°04′51″W
- Country: France
- Region: Nouvelle-Aquitaine
- Department: Deux-Sèvres
- Arrondissement: Niort
- Canton: Celles-sur-Belle

Government
  - Mayor (2020–2026): Murielle Heurtebise-Daniaud
- Area^{1}: 25.95 km^{2} (10.02 sq mi)
- Elevation: 180 m (590 ft)
- Highest elevation: 188 m (617 ft)
- Lowest elevation: 80 m (260 ft)
- Population (2023): 531
  - Density: 20.5/km^{2} (53.0/sq mi)
- Time zone: UTC+01:00 (CET)
  - Summer (DST): UTC+02:00 (CEST)
- INSEE/Postal code: 79115 /79800
- ^{1} French Land Register data, which excludes lakes, ponds, glaciers > 1 km^{2} (0.386 sq mi or 247 acres) and river estuaries.

Exoudun is a commune in the Deux-Sèvres department in the Nouvelle-Aquitaine region in western France.

== Etymology ==
The name is attested in 872 in the form of Exuldunus.

According to Albert Dauzat and Charles Rostaing, the name is derived from the Gallic uxelo, high, and dunum, fortress. (see Issoudun)

Ernest Nègre also brings the same meaning, from the Gallic adjective uxello- meaning elevated + the suffix dunum, fortified enclosure.

== History ==
Human occupation in the area dates back to prehistoric times, during the Neolithic, when the first neolithic men who practiced agriculture arrived, as highlighted by the presence in the commune itself, of the dolmen near the village that presents a covering table and two orthostats at its side. The dolmen's condition is considered ruined. The 'Pierre Levée des sept chemins' is also located halfway on the road towards the Chirons de Bougon, where half a dozen tumulus are located, which are among the oldest on the Atlantic coast and were used for almost 2000 years. The presence of pottery in these different archaeological sites, dating from the Bronze Age, is evidence of the presence of inhabitants.

During Antiquity, in Exoudun, as its toponymy attests, the presence of the Celtic Gauls, probably the Pictons, as well as a fortified enclosure of good height are proven.

During the Middle Ages, Lordship of Exoudun was held in succession by several noble families, including the Lusignans. Lord of Exoudun was titled: Seigneur d'Exoudun.

== See also ==
- Communes of the Deux-Sèvres department
- Raoul I of Exoudun
- Raoul II of Exoudun

== Sources ==
- Jourdain, Charles; Delisle, Léopold; Wailly, Natalis de, eds. (1894). Recueil des Historiens des Gaules et de la France. Vol. 23. Paris: H. Welter.
- Painter, Sidney (1955). "The Houses of Lusignan and Chatellerault 1150-1250". Speculum. 30 (3): 374–384. doi:10.2307/2848076. JSTOR 2848076. S2CID 162997835.
