= La Mothe-Saint-Héray =

- Commune
- Coat of arms
- Location of La Mothe-Saint-Héray
- Location within France Location within Nouvelle-Aquitaine
- Coordinates: 46°21′21″N 0°06′32″W
- Country: France
- Region: Nouvelle-Aquitaine
- Department: Deux-Sèvres
- Arrondissement: Niort
- Canton: Celles-sur-Belle

Government
  - Mayor (2020–2026): Philippe Blanchet
- Area^{1}: 14.92 km^{2} (5.76 sq mi)
- Elevation: 80 m (260 ft)
- Highest elevation: 178 m (584 ft)
- Lowest elevation: 67 m (220 ft)
- Population (2023): 1,652
  - Density: 110.7/km^{2} (286.8/sq mi)
- Time zone: UTC+01:00 (CET)
  - Summer (DST): UTC+02:00 (CEST)
- INSEE/Postal code: 79184 /79800
- ^{1} French Land Register data, which excludes lakes, ponds, glaciers > 1 km^{2} (0.386 sq mi or 247 acres) and river estuaries.

La Mothe-Saint-Héray (French pronunciation: [la mɔt sɛ̃.t‿eʁɛ]) is a commune in the Deux-Sèvres department in western France.

== See also ==
- Communes of the Deux-Sèvres department
