= Siege of Geertruidenberg (1351–1352) =

Long siege of Geertruidenberg Castle

- Part of the Hook and Cod wars
- Reconstructed foundations of Geertruidenberg Castle
Date	1351 – August 1352
Location	Geertruidenberg, County of Holland (present-day North Brabant the Netherlands) 51.699044°N 4.859439°E
Result	Cod victory

Commanders and leaders
John IV, Lord of Arkel	Philips I, Lord of Polanen
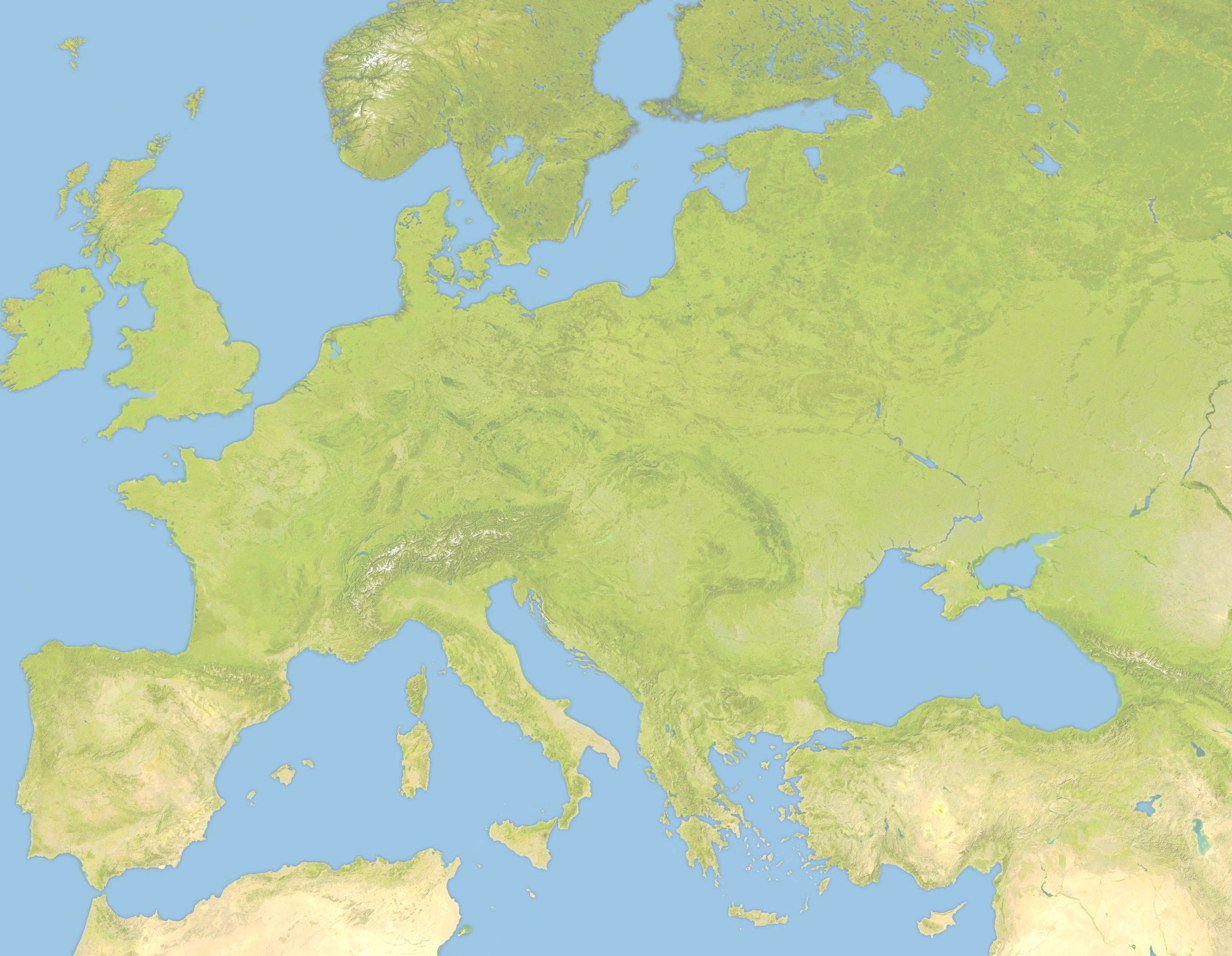
- Location within Netherlands Siege of Geertruidenberg (1351–1352) (Europe without the extreme north)

The siege of Geertruidenberg (1351–1352) was a long siege of Geertruidenberg Castle during the first of the Hook and Cod wars. It took place between 4 October 1351 and 18 August 1352.

== Context ==
=== Geertruidenberg and its castle ===
In 1345, Geertruidenberg was part of the County of Holland. The town itself was well fortified and was important for the county, not in the least because it was closest to the County of Hainaut, which was in a personal union with Holland and Zeeland. Geertruidenberg was also important as a border town to protect Holland against the Duchy of Brabant.

In 1323, Willem van Duvenvoorde got orders to build what would become Geertruidenberg Castle. About 5 kilometers to the south, Van Duvenvoorde also had the formidable Strijen Castle, his residence as Lord of Oosterhout. He connected the two by a paved road.

Geertruidenberg Castle was a special kind of castle. It was owned by the Count of Holland, and kept by a castellan. The office of castellan was not unusual, but at Geertruidenberg Castle the castellan also happened to be Schout of the town. In 1344 Van Duvenvoorde succeeded in making his right to both offices inheritable. In 1347 or 1348 he invested John II of Polanen with both offices.

=== War between Margaret of Hainaut and William V (1349-1354) ===
The first of the Hook and Cod wars was fought between Margaret of Hainaut and her son William V. It started with an attack by the Bishop of Utrecht. In August 1350 the situation led to an open revolt by most of the Holland cities led by Delft. In February 1351 Margaret's son William joined the rebellion. His side was called the Cod party. The party that remained loyal to Margaret was called the Hook party.

Margaret tried to subdue William by summoning him to Dordrecht, but failed. In April 1351 the important city of Dordrecht joined the rebellion. In May William made peace with Utrecht. Meanwhile, the Cod party attacked and quickly conquered a lot of the smaller castles of the Hook lords. On 15 June the town of Geertruidenberg joined William's side.

Margaret had succeeded in enlisting the help of England. In May she won the naval Battle of Veere, but when she wanted to press her advantage, her forces were decisively beaten in the 4 July 1351 naval Battle of Zwartewaal on the Oude Maas.

== Siege ==
=== Position of the defenders (Hooks) ===
Sign with explanation

All that remained of the Hook party in Holland after the July 1351 Battle of Zwartewaal were some castles that the party occupied. For the isolated Brederode Castle, Groot Poelgeest, and Oud Haerlem Castle the situation looked hopeless. Vreeland castle on the border with Utrecht was in a better position, but Geertruidenberg Castle probably had the best chance to hold out.

One of the reasons why Geertruidenberg Castle was so strong, was that it was probably very difficult to cut its supply routes. The Hook Strijen Castle was less than 5 km to the south over a good road. Whether Strijen Castle was a Brabant or a Holland castle was debatable, but its owner Willem van Duvenvoorde was a mighty member of the Hook party. A simple blockade with a few forces would be dangerous, because these could be surprised by a raiding party from Strijen Castle. This is proven by the delay between Geertruidenberg switching to the Cod side on 15 June 1351, and the start of the blockade or siege. This was at least three and a half months later, perhaps even more than half a year later.

A second reason for the strength of Geertruidenberg, was that Willem van Duvenvoorde was a very important leader of the Hook party. He was probably its most important leader after Margaret. Van Duvenvoorde was very wealthy and would have used his riches to invest in the defense of Geertruidenberg Castle, and with it Strijen Castle.

A third reason why Geertruidenberg Castle was so strong remained obscure until very recently. In the 16th century, the castle was completely demolished and disappeared out of view. With the scant descriptions and probably unreliable images that survived, historians assumed that Geertruidenberg Castle was a typical medieval square castle with square towers, much like Medemblik Castle or Muiden Castle. The archaeological excavation of the castle in 2001 indeed found a straight wall of at least 32 m long. In 2006 it was followed by an investigation with ground penetrating radar. This indicated that the main castle measured about 50 by 50 m. I.e. Geertruidenberg Castle was about twice the size of the average square castle in Holland.

The defenders were led by Philips I, Lord of Polanen, a younger brother of John II, Lord of Polanen, the lord of Geertruidenberg and castellan of the castle. John II got these fiefs from his father John I, Lord of Polanen, who in turn got them from his half brother of Willem van Duvenvoorde.

=== Attackers (Cods) ===
After the July 1351 Battle of Zwartewaal, William's Cod party had little reason for concern in Holland itself. In the County of Zeeland however, the (then) major city of Zierikzee was still loyal to Margaret. William obviously gave precedence to this threat, and started a siege of Zierikzee. On 21 August 1351 he made a treaty with Zierikzee. If Margaret would not show up with an army before October 1, the city would submit to William. In case she did, the hostilities would continue. By early October 1351, William was indeed master of Zierikzee.

The besiegers of Geertruidenberg Castle were led by John IV, Lord of Arkel. All the Cod leaders and their henchmen joined the siege. These Cod leaders were: John I, Lord of Egmond, Gerard III van Heemskerk, Gerard van Herlaar, and Jan van der Noordeloos. They were joined by militia from Dordrecht, Haarlem, Delft, Leiden, and Geertruidenberg.

=== Siege and surrender ===
Two dates are given for the start of the siege. Some say it started in October 1351. Others say it started in December 1351. Hunger forced Philips van Polanen to ask for a truce in mid 1352. William V then travelled to Geertruidenberg.

On 22 July 1352, a temporary truce was made. Philips sent his envoy Philips van Tetrode to urge his Hook friends in Breda to send a relief force. In mid-August, the Hook party indeed sent a few hundred cavalry from Breda. These were led by John of Polanen. On 17 August these returned to Brussels, apparently without any result.

On 18 August 1352, Philips van Polanen surrendered Geertruidenberg Castle. Philips and his warriors were allowed to keep the goods they had before the war and were allowed a safe conduct to use them. Similar provisions were made for Philips van Tetrode, Willem van Foreest, Arend Nachtegaal, Wouter van Haarlem, Willem the bastard van Wassenaar, Gijsbrecht Hendrikszoon van de Lek, Philips van Beesd, and Gerrit the Bastard van Tetrode.

== Aftermath ==
With the surrender of Geertruidenberg Castle, the war between William and Margaret was almost over. Philips van Polanen and 34 defenders kept their possessions, but chose to go into exile in Breda.

For the members of the Hook party, the outcome of the siege was a bit counterintuitive. E.g. the Geertruidenberg citizens Claes and Philips Nachtegaal lost their goods after William V reconquered Geertruidenberg. Their father Arend (above), who was part of the castle garrison, kept his due to the treaty. John II of Polanen was the official schout of Geertruidenberg and castellan of its castle. He was not part of the defenders of the castle and lost these fiefs. In 1356 he made his peace with William V, but William V retained these fiefs to himself.
