= Polanen Castle =

Castle in the Netherlands

- Kasteel Polanen
- Monster, the Netherlands
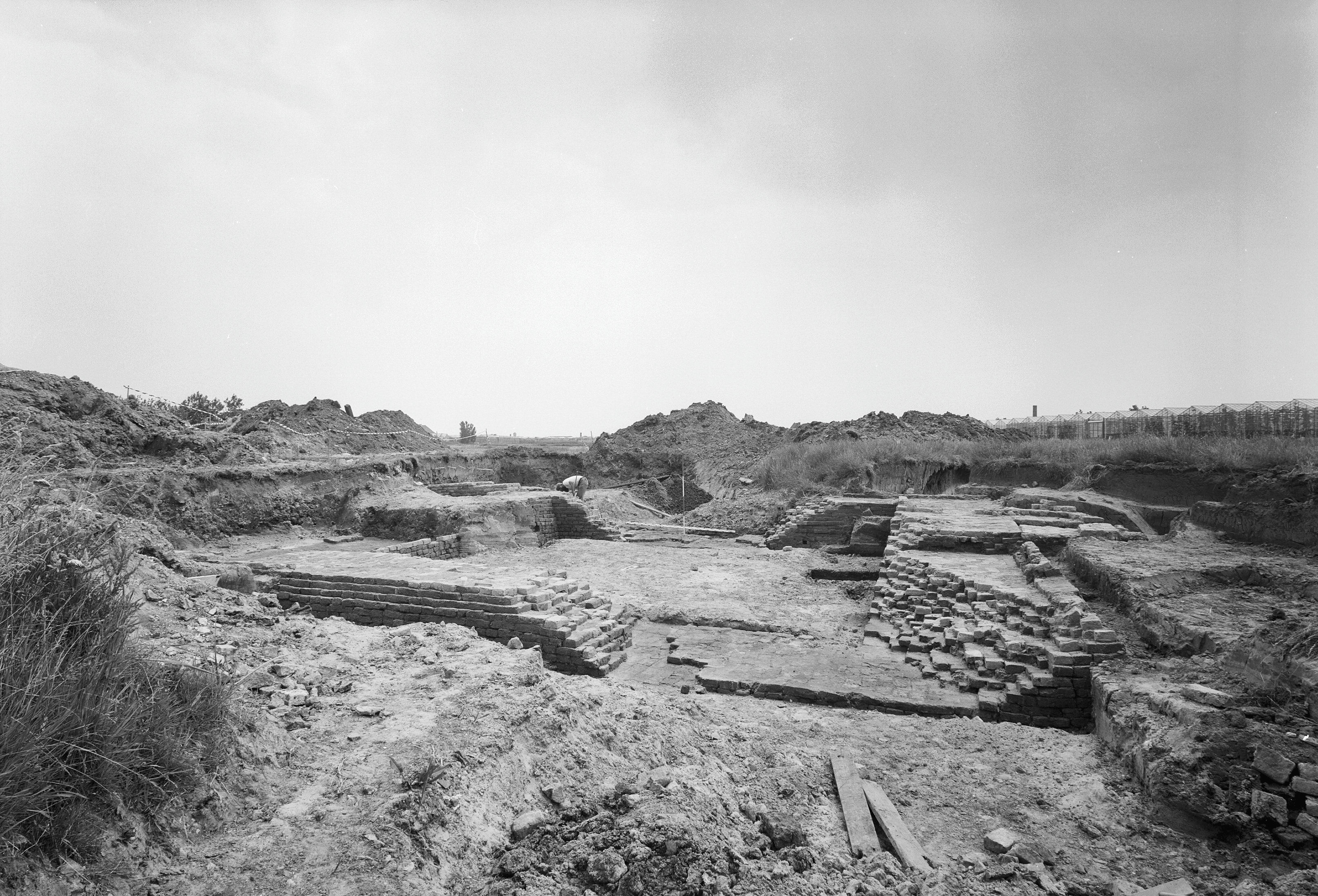
- Foundations of the tower house

Site information
- Type: Castle

Location
- South Holland
- Location within South Holland
- Coordinates: 52.030491°N 4.195978°E

Site history
- Built: c. 1295
- Demolished: 1394
- Battles/wars: Siege of 1351

Polanen Castle was a castle located in today's Monster, South Holland in the Netherlands. The ancestral home of the Polanen family, it suffered a siege in 1351 and was demolished in 1394. It was replaced by a small manor somewhat to the south.

== Castle Characteristics ==
=== The castle ===
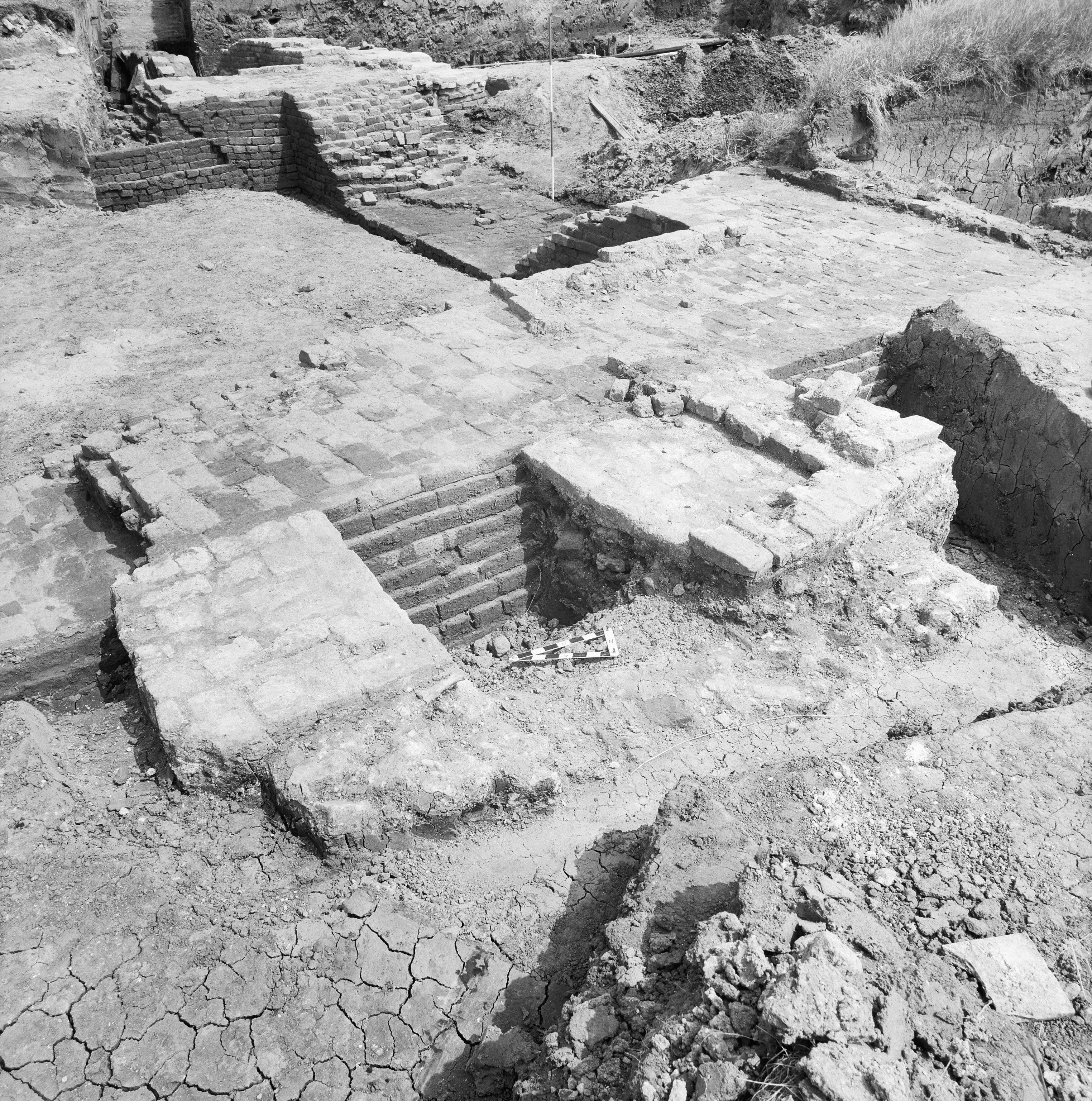
Tower west side

Polanen Castle was located on an island, or inner bailey of 42 by 29 m. The island was surrounded by a 12 m wide moat. On the northeast corner was a tower house or donjon built c. 1300. It measured 11.60 by 11.30 m, and on the inside 7.60 by 7.10 m, making the wall about 2 m thick at the foundation level. At the top the walls were still 1.30 m thick. It was at least 12 m high. The bricks used measured 29-30 * 13-14 * 5–7 cm.

In the 1320s other structures were added to the castle. On the northeast corner of the terrain a small stair tower was added. Its northwest corner was adjacent to the east corner of the tower house. It was identified as a stair tower with privy due to it being open on the water front at floor level. The top of the stair was later found back in the northern moat. The tower had two funnels on the side of the moat. Here its wall was only half a stone (c. 15 cm) thick. On the outside, the surface of the walls of the stair tower had been smoothened and painted red.

The entrance of the tower house was probably on the west side, because two foundation pieces poeren were found near that side. The kitchen and store rooms were in the cool northwest corner of the tower.

South of the tower house was a building of unknown characteristics. Its presence was deduced from debris in the moat. On the northwest corner of the bailey was another building. Part of its northern wall of 75 cm thick was found on the bottom of the moat. Some heavy piles in the moat before this building indicate that the bridge over the moat was located here.

What sets Polanen Castle apart from other solitary tower houses is that it was built on a large site. Most other solitary towers were located on a small island without room for other buildings. It therefore seems that Polanen was all along planned to be expanded, but that this plan was cut short by its demolishment in 1394.

=== The manor ===
South of the bailey was another terrain of 21 by 21 m. The oldest artefacts found on this terrain dated from 1400, making it the probably location of the manor which succeeded to Polanen Castle after it was finally demolished in 1393. This manor consisted of two perpendicular buildings with a small tower, which only had a representative purpose.

This island had a moat of only 9 m wide. The manor gradually got the character of a farm in the fifteenth century. For agricultural purposes, the island was expanded by moving the southeast moat further outwards. In about 1700 the manor was replaced by a regular farm.

== History ==
=== The Van Polanen family ===
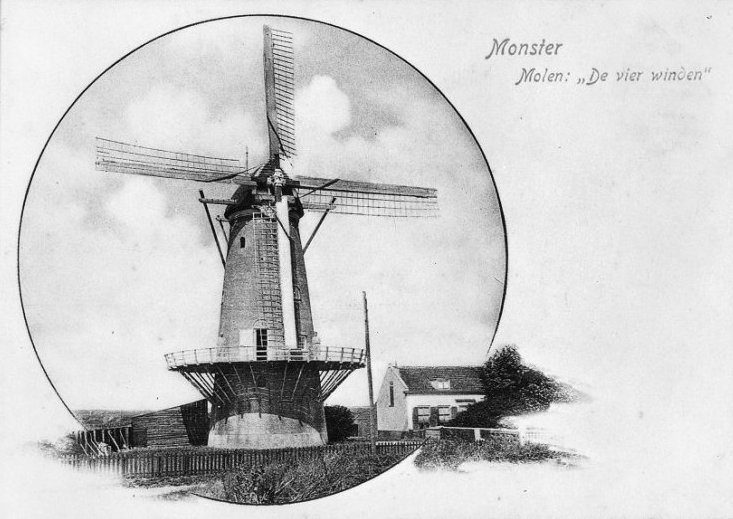
The mill at Voswijk

On 6 November 1295 Floris V, Count of Holland granted the fief Polanen 'with the house' to Philips van Duvenvoorde. He was a junior member of the Van Duvenvoorde family, which was seated at Duivenvoorde Castle.

Philip's son John (c. 1285–1342) and Philip's natural son Willem van Duvenvoorde would become very successful. John acquired many possessions and fiefs near Monster. John was helped by his uncle Diederik van der Wale, who e.g. gifted the very profitable wind mill at Voswijk near Monster. Already in 1305 John was referred to as 'Van Polanen'. Both John of Polanen and Willem van Duvenvoorde became counselor of count Willem III in about 1316.

The reason that Polanen Castle remained a tower house, and did not develop into a new castle, was the dazzling career of the brothers. On 5 August 1320 John got granted Nieuwendoorn Castle near Krabbendam, which was a full castle. In 1327 John got Oud Haerlem Castle, which would become a castle that matched his new stature. In 1342 John II, Lord of Polanen succeeded his father.

=== A younger Van Polanen branch ===
In 1345 Philips I, Lord of Polanen was granted Polanen Castle in subfief by his older brother John II. The act mentioned an: Die huysinghe tot Pollanen, beyde boven ende beneden, ende met den heemwerf daer sij op staet ende met den ouden hove binnen de uyterste grafte. (The house at Polanen, upper and lower, and the terrain on which it stands, including the old court inside the outer moat.).

=== The 1351 siege ===
During the Hook and Cod wars the Van Polanen family belonged to the Hook alliance, which supported Margaret II, Countess of Hainaut against her son William V of Holland. The war erupted in earnest after William of Holland entered his county in February 1351. After failed negotiations William seized Dordrecht in about April 1351. He then started his campaign against the castles of the Hook lords. First came a lengthy siege of Rosenburgh Castle near Voorschoten. Next came a short siege of Binckhorst Castle, and then it was time to besiege Polanen Castle.

On 1 June 1351 the battering ram which had served at Rosenburg Castle, and a new one, were ordered to Polanen. These were called mol or mole, and would provide cover for its crew while they filled the moat, and then broke down the wall by battering. Shortly before 1 June the construction of a siege tower for Polanen had started in The Hague.

In early June the first besiegers arrived. These were perhaps no more than a few dozen men that blocked access to the castle. It might be that these were only the 9 men that arrived on 6 June, 8 of them English. On 8 June Lord Willem van der Wateringe arrived with 24 English. Soon the count's tent and banner arrived before the castle, as well as a trebuchet. The total number of besiegers is estimated at 50. Judging by the recovery of trebuchet stone bullets and debris in the moat, the bombardment was quite serious. The besieged surrendered about 22 June.

=== Probable renovation ===
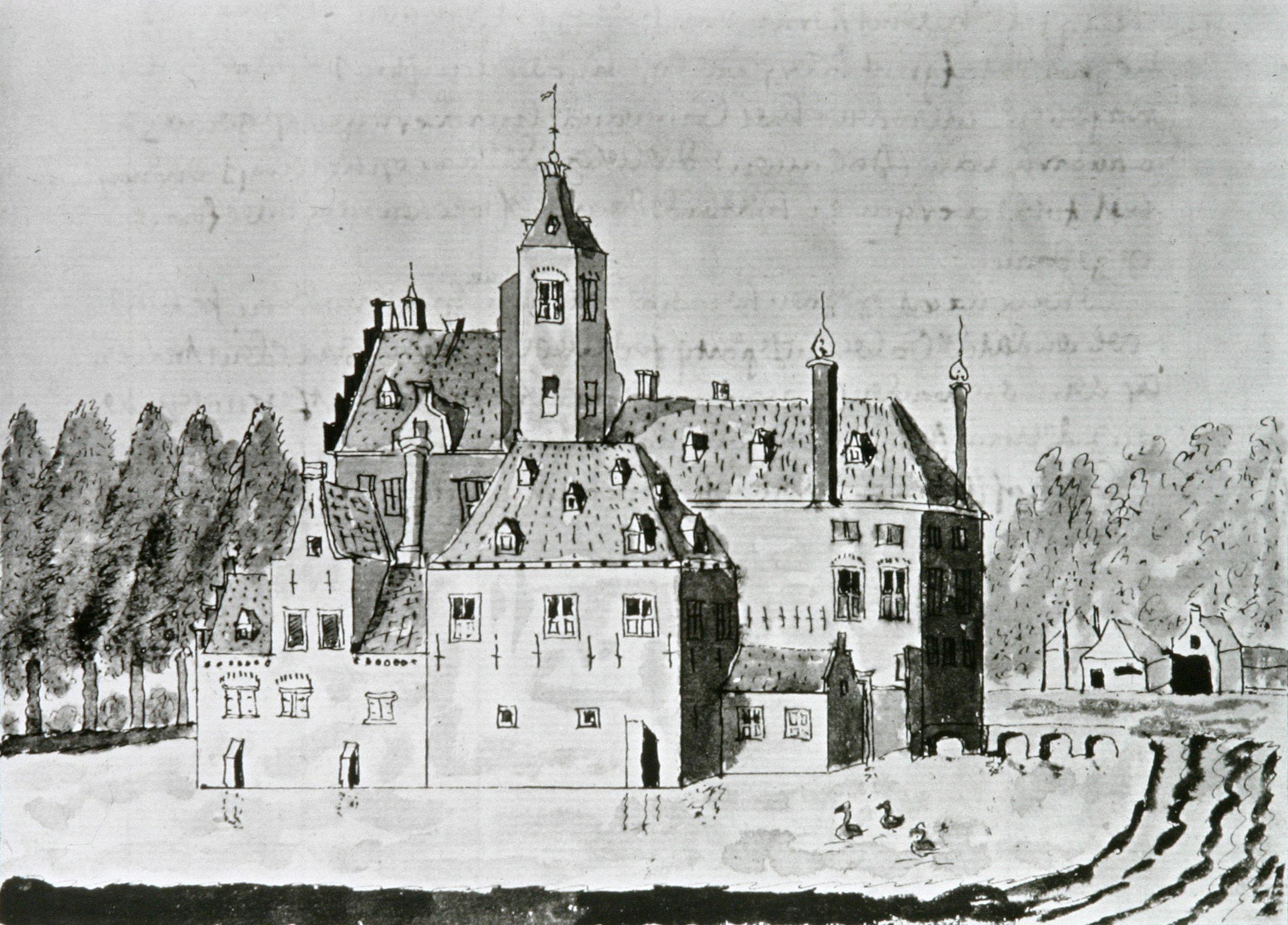
Later impression of the Manor Polanen

What happened next at Polanen is not that clear. There are no indications that Polanen Castle was demolished after the 1351 siege. A quick destruction to render it permanently unusable would have entailed pushing most of it into the moat, but no signs of that were found.

During the 1351 siege, Philip I of Polanen was absent, because he was in command of Geertruidenberg Castle, which would get under siege in early October 1351. In 1355 Philip I made his peace with Count William. After William went insane, his younger brother Albert became regent in 1358. The Cod faction and the city of Delft opposed his regency, and so the Hooks were on the side of regent Albert.

There is a claim that in February 1359, just before the 1359 Siege of Delft, some Cod lords attacked and destroyed Polanen Castle and Binckhorst Castle. Even if this raid took place, it probably did not cause lasting damage. For Philip I, these were good years, by 1366 he was a counselor of the count. In 1374 he commanded 25 men against Utrecht.

=== Destruction in 1394 ===
In 1375 Philip II succeeded as Lord of Polanen. He made a quick career at the court of Albert. In 1381 he became bailiff of Schieland, and in 1391 Hoogheemraad of Delfland.

In the night of 22–23 September 1392 the count's mistress Aleid van Poelgeest was murdered. Philip van Polanen was one of the main suspects, and fled the county. In the 1394 accounts of the county, money was paid to a mason for 10 weeks of breaking bricks from the castle. Another contractor was paid for the 28 days that he spent to fill the moats, and to transport the brick to The Hague.

=== The manor is constructed ===
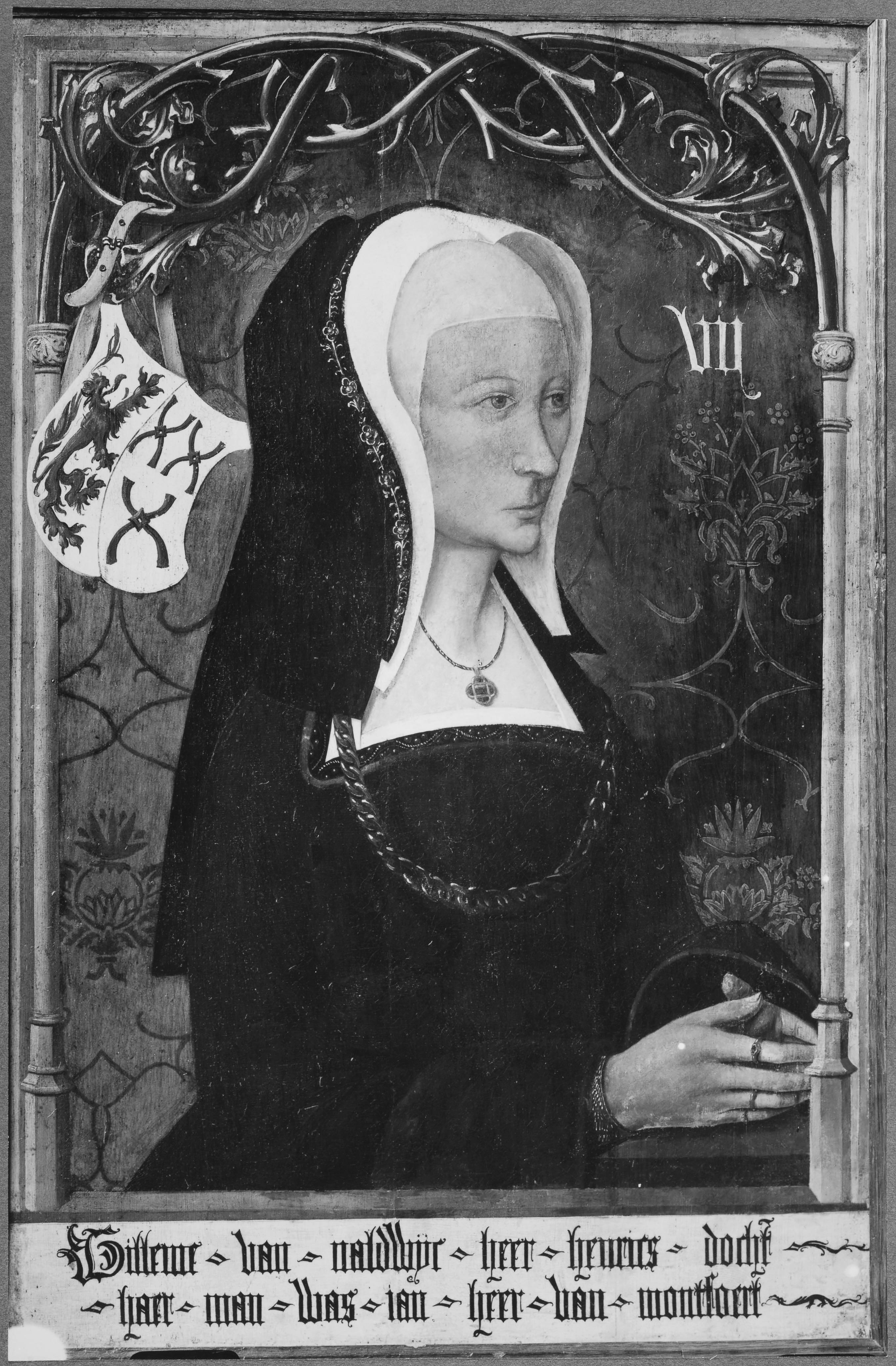
Wilhelmina van Naaldwijk

In 1396 Philip II of Polanen made peace with Count Albert. He got some of his offices back, and joined the count in four campaigns against Frisia. Between 1396 and 1401 Philip built a new manor somewhat southeast of the former castle.

=== Van Heenvliet ===
The possession by the Van Heenvliet family started in 1401. In that year Philip II of Polanen died, and Philip II's sister Elisabeth of Polanen inherited the fiefs she could inherit, like Polanen Castle. Other parts of the inheritance reverted to the liege lord. Polanen included 61.5 Morgen of land. Elisabeth also got some other goods. She died before 5 April 1405. She was married to Hugo IV of Heenvliet (c. 1351–1409). Their fourth child, Catharina (1371-1421) married Hendrik III van Naaldwijk (1367-1419).

=== Van Naaldwijk and Arenberg ===
Hendrik III van Naalswijk had a son Willem III (1397-1444), married to Wilhelmina van Egmond. They had a son Hendrik IV van Naaldwijk (1434-1496) married to Machteld van Jaarsveld. Hendrik IV and Machteld had a daughter Wilhelmina van Naaldwijk (1460-1506). By about 1450 the Van Naaldwijk family owned the fief Polanen. Wilhelmina married Jan III van Montfoort (c. 1448–1522) in 1475. In 1507 their daughter Machteld van Montfoort (1475–1550) inherited Polanen. She was married to Robert van der Mark Lord of Arenberg. In 1550 her daughter Margaretha, who was married to Jan de Ligne, inherited Polanen.

During the Eighty Years' War Charles of Arenberg remained loyal to the King of Spain, leading to the sequester of his possessions in Holland. During the Twelve Years' Truce Arenberg sold most of his lands in 1612. Frederick Henry, Prince of Orange bought part of the rights and land for 360,000 guilders. Polanen was not part of this deal. In 1612 a description of the inventory was made. It was a farm with 14 cows, and 5 horses. It grew crops and produced cheese.

In 1627 Frederick Henry bought Polanen Castle for 13,390 guilders. Some maps depicting the castle were then made by surveyors. The transaction with Frederick Henry ended the status of Polanen as an arrear fief, because Frederick Henry had been the liege lord of the lords of Polanen. The old manor was probably demolished in about 1700, including the moat. A new farm was built with old brick.

== Archaeological excavations ==
=== First excavation ===
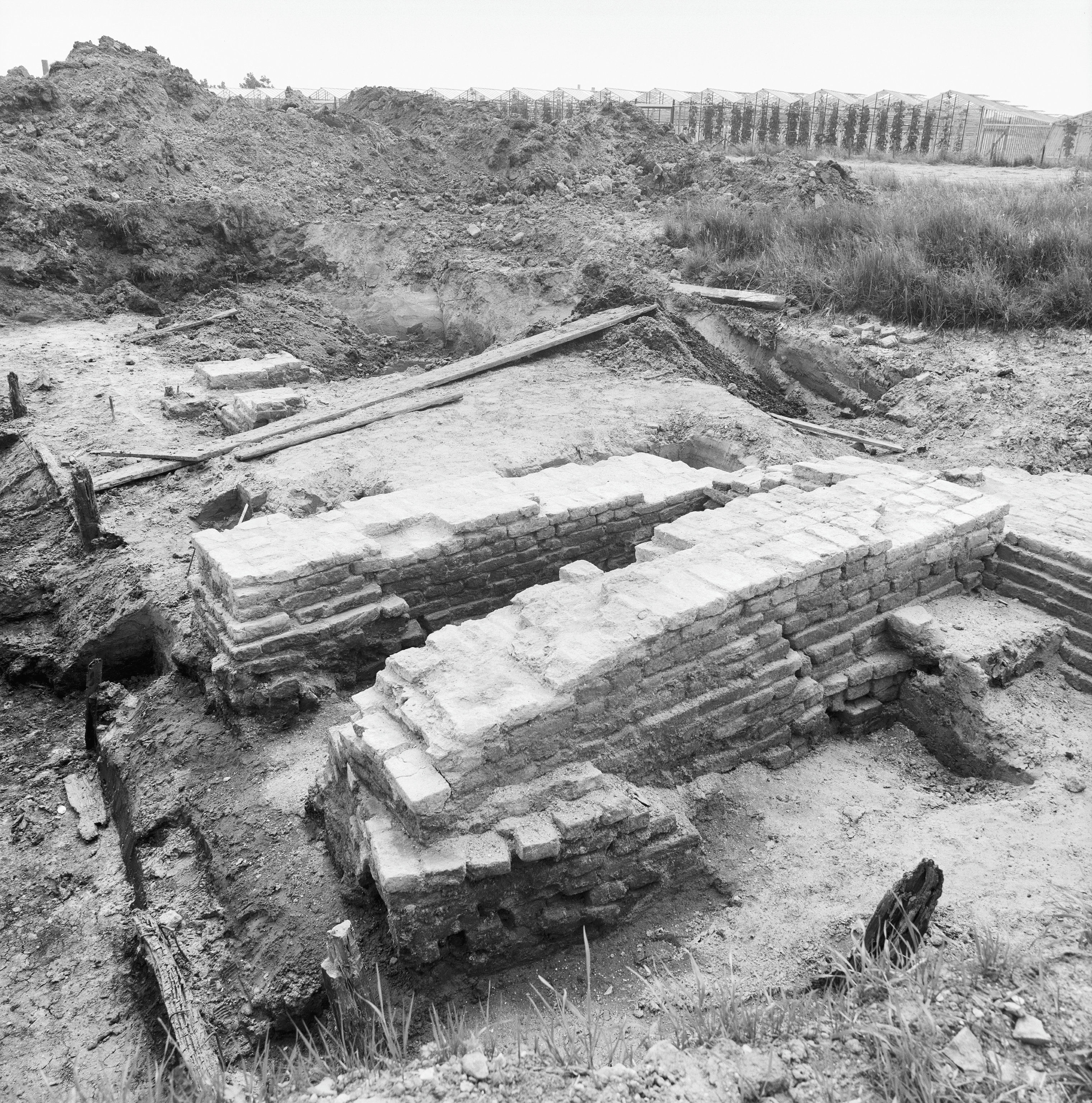
Stair / privy tower

In 1936 some artefacts were found near Monster, amongst these a sarcophagus, and many bricks. Historians immediately connected these to Polanen Castle. In late March 1940 Archeologist Jaap Renaud succeeded in borrowing some mobilized soldiers from Captain Roorda van Eysinga, so he could do a preliminary investigation. Some digging then uncovered part of the walls of Castle Polanen. In 1942 Renaud published the results.

=== Excavation in 1981 ===
In the early 1980s there were plans for greenhouse farming on the terrain of Castle Polanen. This would entail reshuffling the ground till 5 meters below the surface, and so a new thorough excavation was planned. This was done by the Westlands Centrum voor Streekgeschiedenis, and led by E.J. Bult.

This new excavation completed the picture about the tower house, its bailey, and the location of the succeeding manor and farm. It confirmed that Polanen was a solitary tower house on a larger bailey. This excavation also found trebuchet stones and arrowheads in the old moat. This confirmed that the siege had been quite serious at Polanen Castle.

The excavation also confirmed the events after the siege of 1351, and the final demolishment of the castle. The moat held a layer of debris with many bricks from 1351. Above that was a normal sediment layer with almost no artefacts, leading to doubts about whether the castle was inhabited after 1351. On top of that was a layer of debris with many small pieces of brick, and above all, much mortar. It confirmed the 1394 demolishing by a mason, which led to moving the bricks to The Hague for reuse.

=== Folly ===
After the 1981 excavation, the ruins of Polanen Castle were completely removed. The medieval bricks, so called kloostermoppen, were stored in order to use them in renovations, but were later judged unsuitable for that purpose. The then owner of villa Nieuw Polanen used these kloostermoppen to build a folly (pseudo-ruins) in his garden.
