= Geertruidenberg Castle =

Castle in North Brabant, Netherlands

- Kasteel van Geertruidenberg
- Geertruidenberg
- Reconstructed part of Geertruidenberg Castle

Site information
- Open to the public: Yes, as reconstructed foundation

Location
- The Netherlands
- Location within North Brabant
- Coordinates: 51.699044°N 4.859439°E

Site history
- Built: 1323

Geertruidenberg Castle was a major medieval castle in Geertruidenberg, then part of the County of Holland now in North-Brabant, Netherlands

== Context ==
The geography of the area around Geertruidenberg has radically changed over the centuries. In the early 14th century, Geertruidenberg was a Holland town on the southern border of the Grote Waard. This was an agricultural area that had a dike all around it. In 1283 this dike had been completed. Somewhat before, in 1273, natural events and more works had moved the main course of the Meuse to what is now known as the Afgedamde Maas. The Afgedamde Maas flows from Heusden to Woudrichem, but was simply known as (Nieuwe) Maas till the late twentieth century.

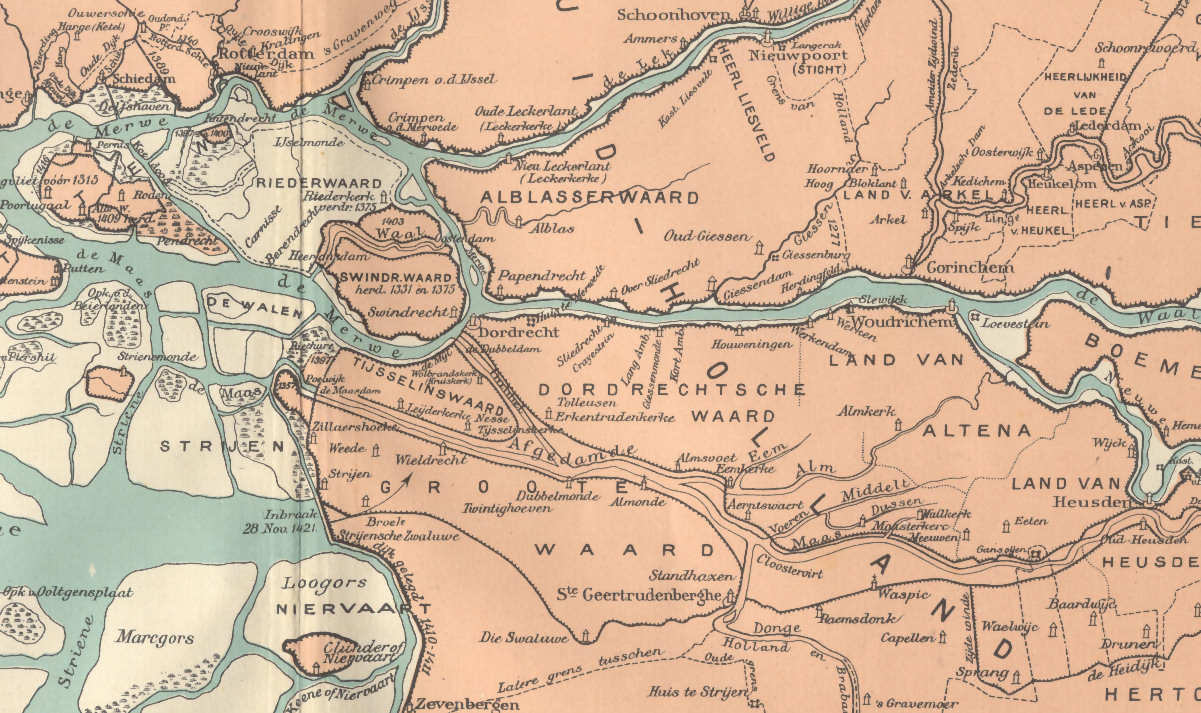
The Grote Waard

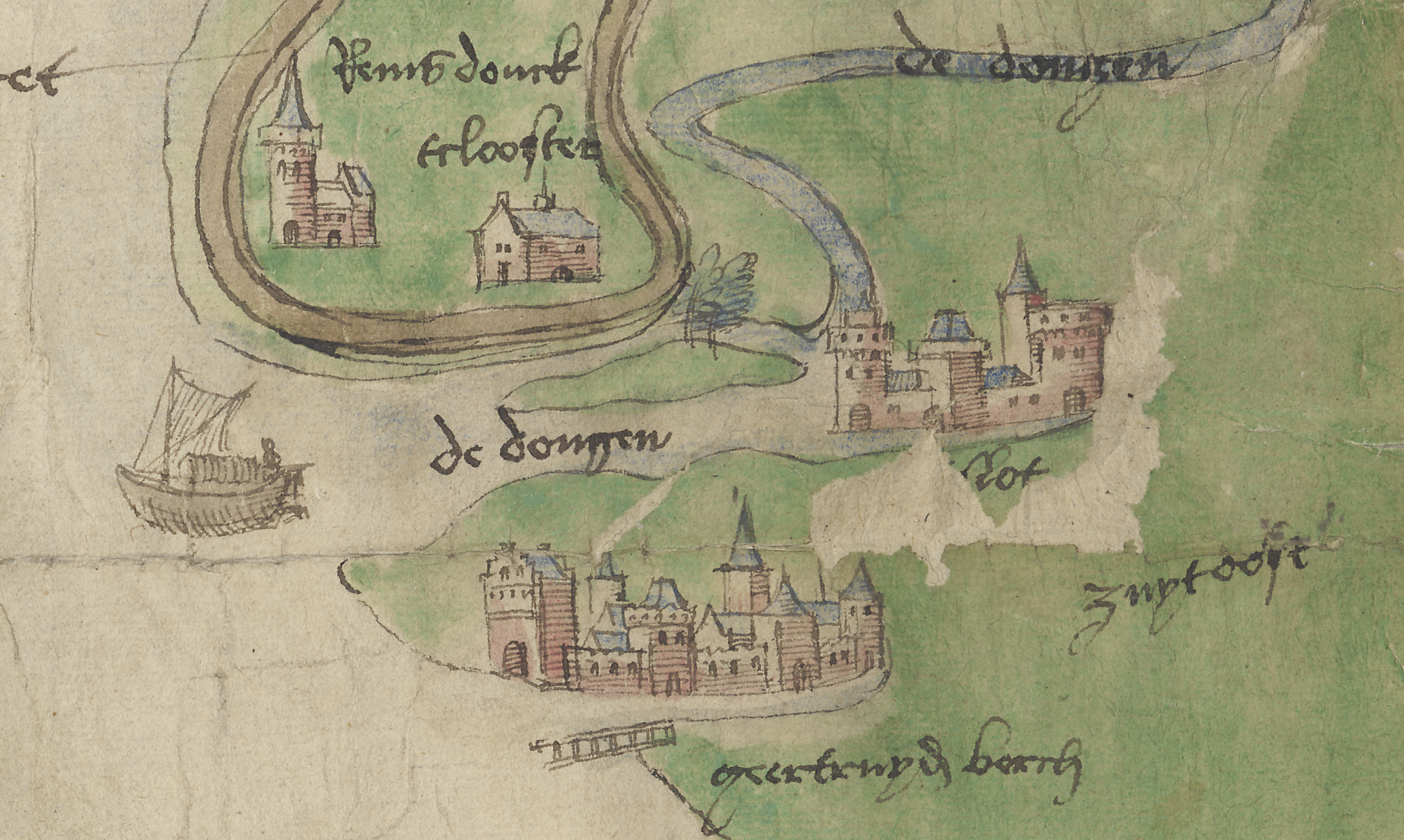
Geertruidenberg and Geertruidenberg Castle on a 16th century map.

The 1421 St. Elizabeth's flood would inundate the Grote Waard. Parts were reclaimed, but a substantial part is now the De Biesbosch National Park, a large wetlands area. In 1874 the Nieuwe Merwede was dug. The Bergse Maas was completed in 1904. After that, the Afgedamde Maas was renamed after a dam that was built at its southern end. All this makes that before 1421, there were no major rivers that blocked the overland connection from Dordrecht to the south.

At the time that Geertruidenberg Castle was built, the surrounding area was still very much a wilderness. The area still had many noticeable differences in height and was very wet. The Donge flowed from the east towards the section of the Meuse which had been dammed off in 1273. The Rul joined the Donge south of Geertruidenberg. Soon after the construction of the castle, a road was built between Geertruidenberg and Strijen Castle near Oosterhout.

An obvious reason to build a strong castle at Geertruidenberg, was that the town was part of the County of Holland, but was very close to the Duchy of Brabant. In 1303 the Duke of Brabant even conquered Geertruidenberg without much effort. The town of Heusden was about 20 km east of Geertruidenberg. In 1279, a conflict erupted between the then quasi-independent lord of Heusden and the city of 's-Hertogenbosch. It led to Heusden becoming a fief of Brabant, especially after the 1318 failed siege of Heusden Castle by William III of Holland.

== History ==
=== Foundation and character of Geertruidenberg Castle ===
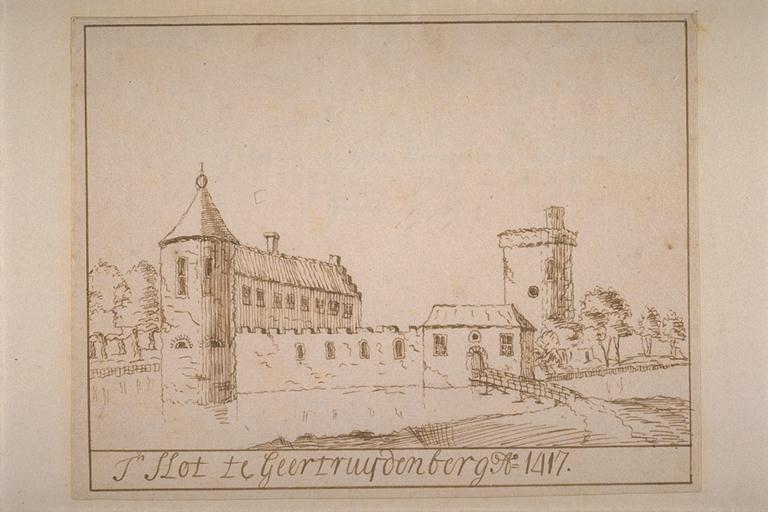
17th century reconstruction of the 1417 situation

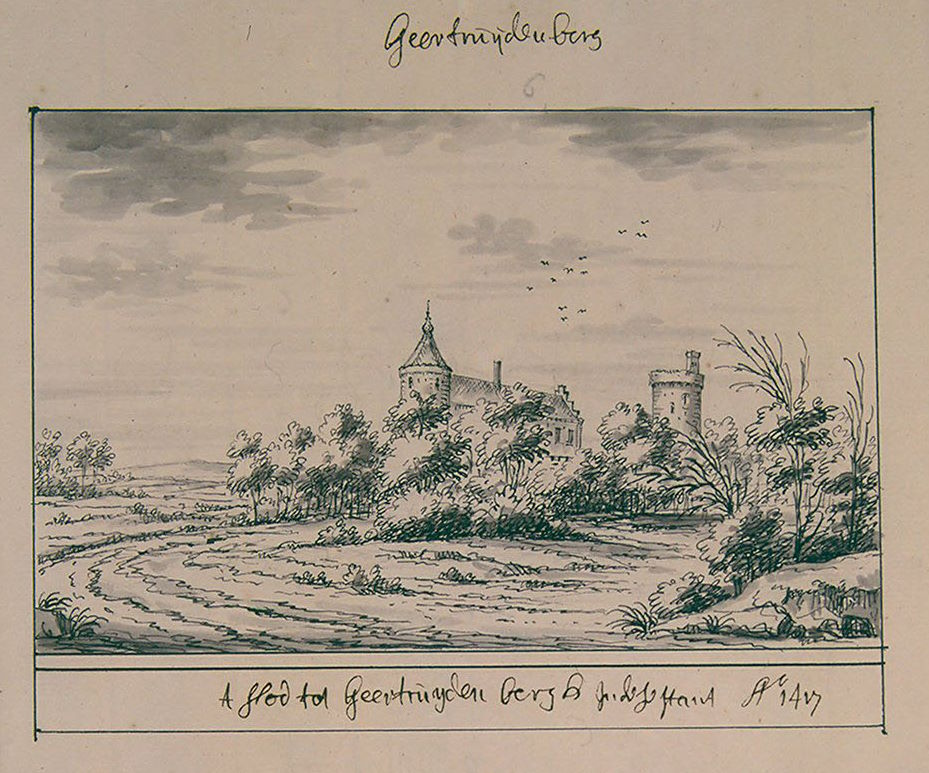
By Stellingwerff

In 1319 Count William III of Holland probably understood that he needed to increase the protection of his borders. That year, he gifted a large stretch of wilderness to the city of Geertruidenberg. The idea was that with the income of these grounds, the city could construct better city walls. In June 1323 Count William invested Willem van Duvenvoorde (1290–1353) as Schout of Geertruidenberg. This office gave some income, but in return Van Duvenvoorde would have to build a castle at the place. For this he could use the bricks that had already been made in the area, but he also had to spend 1,000 Tournai pound of his own money over the next two years. Van Duvenvoorde would have to maintain the castle, but the count would have the right to occupy the castle in times of war. Together with the castles at Zevenbergen and Oosterhout this would be sufficient protection of the southwestern border of Holland.

The 1319 deed also made Van Duvenvoorde hereditary castellan of the new castle. The two offices 'Schout of Geertruidenberg' (for life) and 'Castellan of Geertruidenberg' (inheritable by sons) have to be considered as separate offices. Van Duvenvoorde was allowed to appoint a lieutenant as Schout. On 30 March 1330, the Count of Holland appointed John I, Lord of Polanen as a successor to Willem van Duvenvoorde in case Van Duvenvoorde had no children. In such case, John would inherit both offices and several other goods. In the order the count again stressed the character of the castle as an 'open house' for the count and his family. I.e. Jan would always have to grant access and hospitality to them when they showed up. By that time, the county paid 100 Holland pounds per year for maintenance of the castle.

In the first decades of its existence, Geertruidenberg Castle was used very often by the Counts of Holland. It was an important place for conferences and for the administration of the Grote Waard. After about 1330 the Grote Waard became more dependent on Dordrecht. The subsequent first Hook and Cod War would lead to a serious degradation of the importance of the town and castle.

=== The Hook and Cod Wars ===
The Hook and Cod Wars came about after Count William IV of Holland died without a direct male heir in 1345. On 25 March 1347(/48?) Van Duvenvoorde handed the offices of Schout and castellan of Geertruidenberg to his nephew John II, Lord of Polanen as loans that could both also be inherited by females. This deed was approved by Margaret II, Countess of Hainaut. It was a perfect example of some of the causes of the Hook and Cod Wars.

Reconstructed foundations

In late 1350 Delft and other cities in Holland revolted against Margaret II, Countess of Hainaut, claiming that her son William V of Holland was their rightful lord. On 27 September 1350 Margaret and William were in Geertruidenberg. Here William renounced his pretensions as Count of Holland and asked the rebels to submit to his mother as rightful countess. Margaret stayed at Geertruidenberg till at least 23 October 1350. It's safe to assume that both stayed at the castle at the time. The attempt to restore order in Holland from Geertruidenberg and later from Dordrecht, failed.

In early 1351, William escaped from Hainaut, and became the leader of the rebels, known as the Cod alliance. Already on 15 June the town of Geertruidenberg switched to the Cod alliance. The war was decided by William's victory in the July 1351 Battle of Zwartewaal. By December 1351, only Geertruidenberg Castle, the castle of Vreeland on the Vecht, and Oud Haerlem Castle were held by the Hook alliance.

From the subsequent events, we can assume that a blockade or siege of Geertruidenberg Castle started after 15 June 1351. The siege of Geertruidenberg Castle ended when Philips I, Lord of Polanen handed over the castle by treaty in July–August 1352. Philips got good terms, as he and his companions got back the possessions they had before the war started.

During the (1417–1432) war, The Hooks supported Jacqueline of Bavaria while the Cods supported John III, Duke of Bavaria and later Philip of Burgundy. Geertruidenberg and its castellan first chose Jacqueline's side. When the Cod army got close in 1420, the town let the soldiers in, but the castle held firm to Jacqueline. It led to a half year long siege that was very destructive for the town and the castle. The siege ended with the castellan leaving on terms.

In 1439, Geertruidenberg Castle became the property of the dukes of Brabant. By then it had probably become less significant. In 1489 Jan van Naaldwijk easily conquered Geertruidenberg for the Hook party without there being any mention of the castle. In 1494 Philip I of Castile was acclaimed as lord in the inn 'De Wildeman' in Geertruidenberg and did not spend the night in the town. This indicates that by then, the castle was in severe disrepair.

=== Demolition ===
In 1525 or shortly before, the municipality of Geertruidenberg asked Charles V, Holy Roman Emperor for permission to demolish the ruinous Geertruidenberg Castle. This permission was granted on condition that the retrieved brick would be used for the fortification of the town. In the subsequent years the city's accounts showed many transaction with regard to the demolition of the castle. The last of these showed up in 1547, when 18,000 bricks were retrieved from the castle.

=== Rediscovery ===
On 13 December 2001 works on the sewage system at Wilhelminaplein, on the southern side of Geertruidenberg's center, hit the foundations of the castle. These later showed to be the foundations of the northern tower. It led to an emergency excavation (investigation) in the following days, and to the discovery of an adjoining northeastern wall in April 2002. This was found to be 32 m long. In 2005, there a was geophysical examination of the castle grounds with Ground-penetrating radar. Furthermore, in 2011, foundations of what might have been the outer bailey were found behind the houses Wilhelminaplein 13 and 15.

== Characteristics ==
=== Location of the castle ===
The re-use of the castle bricks led to the complete disappearance of the castle from the landscape. Subsequent works on the southern side of Geertruidenberg in 1833-1837 and 1911 did their part to destroy traces of the castle. However that may be, many supposed that the obscure scratches that Van Deventer placed in the knee of his 16th century map of the town represented the ruins of the castle. This would later be confirmed by the excavations.

=== Characteristics of Geertruidenberg Castle ===
Sign with explanation

The 25 March 1347 deed referred to a castle and outer bailey at Geertruidenberg Castle. A somewhat later act referred to a castle surrounded by a moat with a bailey and a second moat around both. In 1984, that is before the excavations, the accepted supposition was that Geertruidenberg Castle was a square castle with one or two towers and a built up area of about 900 m^{2}. It would also have an outer bailey with a fortified gate.

The ground radar investigations of 2005 indeed showed a square castle, but indicated that its size was about 2,000 m^{2}. It's not immediately clear whether the manuscript map of about 1550 contains a reliable representation of Geertruidenberg Castle. Later drawings were made by Jacobus Stellingwerff (1667-1727), Gerrit Schoemaker (1692-1736), Abraham Rademaker (1677-1735), and Kornelis van Alkemade (1654-1737). Stellingwerf made two drawings of Geertruidenberg: 't slot van Geertruidenberg 1593 depicts the Groot Princenhof; 't slot tot Geertruydenbergh in Welstant Ao 1417 does refer to Geertruidenberg Castle. Stellingwerf's picture can be dismissed as a (romanticized) copy of Schoemaker's picture called: 't slot tot Geertruydenbergh Ao 1417.

What was excavated in 2001/2 were parts of the northern tower of the castle and a section of wall that stretched to the southeast. The tower's foundations were made of red brick of 27 * 13.5 * 7/8 cm, 10 layers being 77 cm high. Between the inner and outer work, the foundations were filled with broken brick. Soundings showed that the height of the remaining piece foundation was at least 2.75 m. On the courtyard side, the tower was covered with white stone. It had an entrance right behind the northeast castle wall, below the (supposed) first arc of that wall. The tower also had a pit with a diameter of 2.44 m and a depth of -0.57 m NAP. Southwest of the pit was the start of a round stairway.

The northeast wall that was excavated was quite impressive. 32 m of the wall were found, but it might be 15 m long than that. The wall itself was 140 cm thick. The 7 supporting buttresses that were found each projected about two meters into the courtyard and were 1.2 m wide. These would have supported a chemin de ronde above. Buttress 3 and 7 were wider than the others. On the outside the wall was covered by stone blocks of 26 * 26 * 90 cm.

In 2001 a smaller excavation was done somewhat more to the west, in front of Wilhelminaplein 13. At great depth this uncovered foundations of what might be supposed to have been the western tower of the castle.

The investigation with ground penetrating radar probably showed the foundations of two or even three towers. One on the eastern side, in the line of the northeast wall. The other on the south of the supposed square castle. It was noted that the radar did not clearly show the north and west towers. On the drawing of the radar results, a fifth tower or building was drawn on the southwest wall. This would probably have been a gatehouse.

== Reconstruction (2017-2022) ==
After the rediscovery of the castle, a plan was made to visualize the castle. This plan was made by Bas Zijlmans, an archeologist who had led the 2000/1 excavations. The plan consisted of rebuilding the base of a 25 m long section of the wall that had been found. On top of the rediscovered foundations, a protective layer of sand would be deposited, and above that a wall that followed the contours of the foundations would stick out about 30–50 cm above the ground. The plan was first proposed to the municipality by Zijlmans on 15 February 2017.

By April 2019 North Brabant province had agreed to furnish half of the project cost of 157,000 EUR and it seemed almost certain that the plan would succeed. By July 2020 the project seemed to get stuck in bickering. The municipality wanted to be in the lead, even while it contributed only 30,000 EUR against 42,000 EUR by people around Zijlmans. However, in October 2020 the 85 year old Bas Zijlmans gave the official start sign for the reconstruction. On 21 May 2022 Mayor Witte and Zijlmans performed the official opening of the monument.
