= 1351 =

1351 in various calendars
- Gregorian calendar: 1351; MCCCLI
- Ab urbe condita: 2104
- Armenian calendar: 800; ԹՎ Պ
- Assyrian calendar: 6101
- Balinese saka calendar: 1272–1273
- Bengali calendar: 757–758
- Berber calendar: 2301
- English Regnal year: 24 Edw. 3 – 25 Edw. 3
- Buddhist calendar: 1895
- Burmese calendar: 713
- Byzantine calendar: 6859–6860
- Chinese calendar: 庚寅年 (Metal Tiger); 4048 or 3841 — to — 辛卯年 (Metal Rabbit); 4049 or 3842
- Coptic calendar: 1067–1068
- Discordian calendar: 2517
- Ethiopian calendar: 1343–1344
- Hebrew calendar: 5111–5112
- Hindu calendars
- Vikram Samvat: 1407–1408
- Shaka Samvat: 1272–1273
- Kali Yuga: 4451–4452
- Holocene calendar: 11351
- Igbo calendar: 351–352
- Iranian calendar: 729–730
- Islamic calendar: 751–752
- Japanese calendar: Kannō 2 (観応２年)
- Javanese calendar: 1263–1264
- Julian calendar: 1351; MCCCLI
- Korean calendar: 3684
- Minguo calendar: 561 before ROC 民前561年
- Nanakshahi calendar: −117
- Thai solar calendar: 1893–1894
- Tibetan calendar: ལྕགས་ཕོ་སྟག་ལོ་ (male Iron-Tiger); 1477 or 1096 or 324 — to — ལྕགས་མོ་ཡོས་ལོ་ (female Iron-Hare); 1478 or 1097 or 325

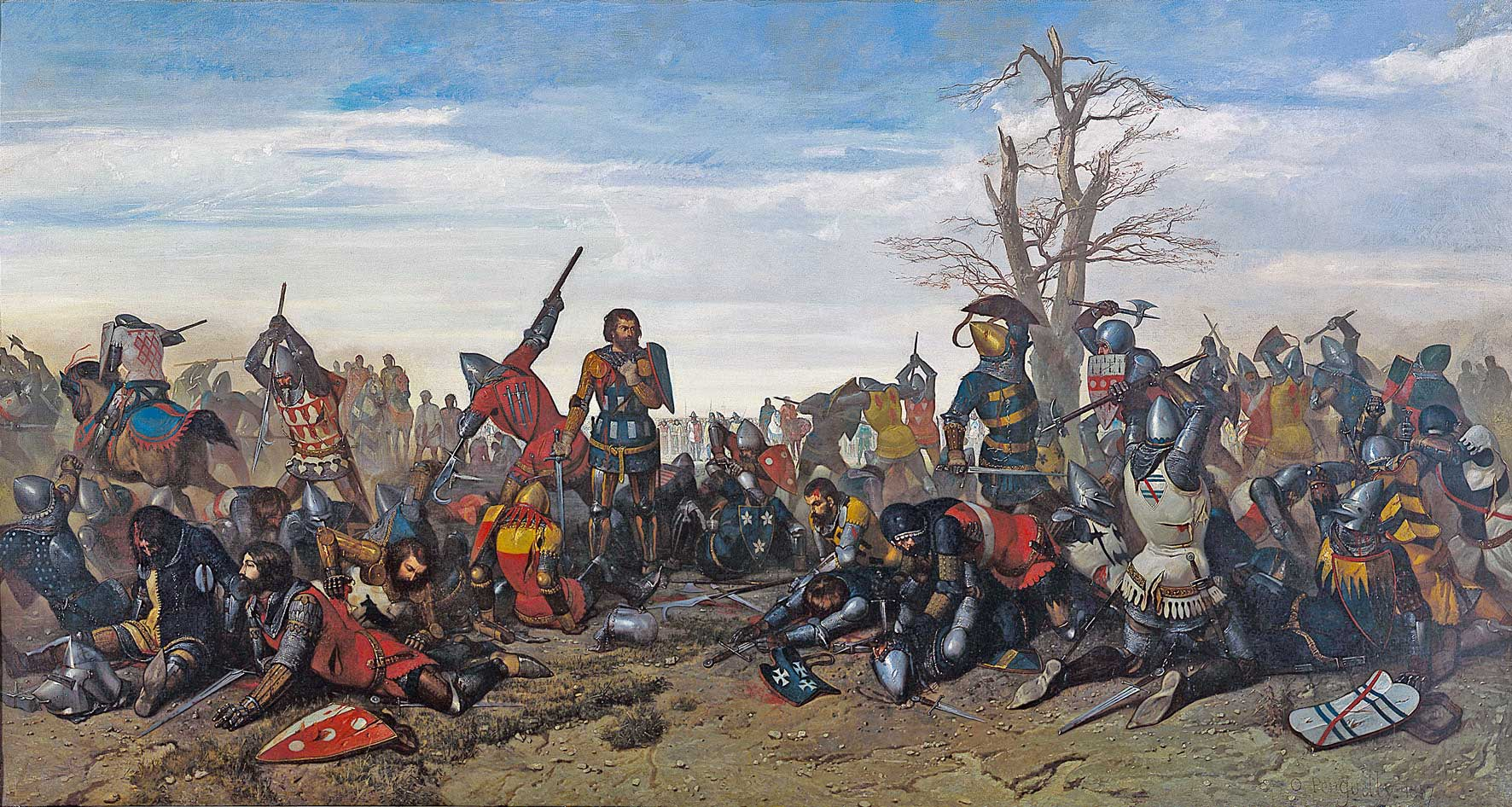
March 26: France and Britain send teams of 30 knights each to fight the Combat of the Thirty for control of the Duchy of Brittany.

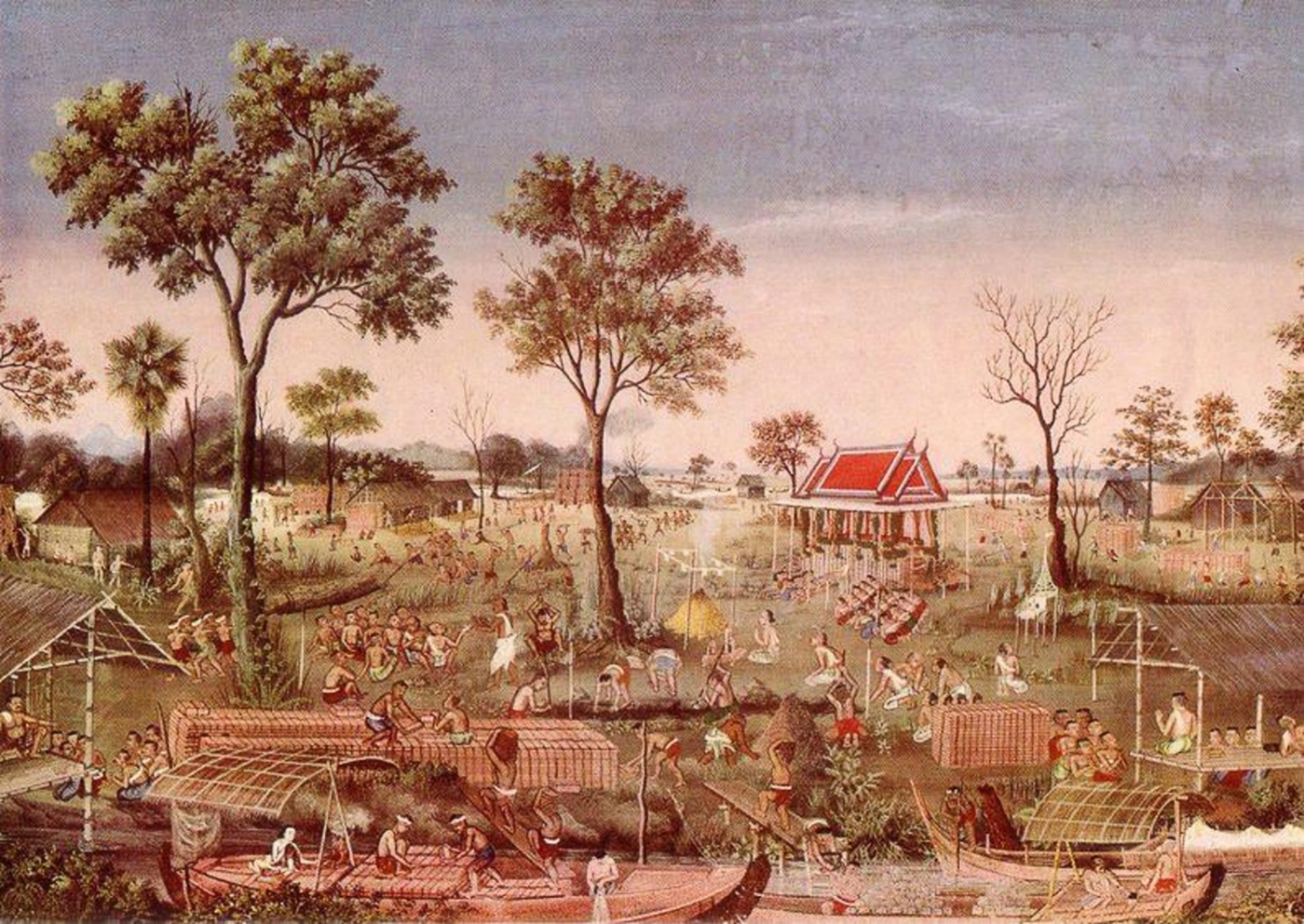
March 4: King Ramatibodi I founds the Ayutthaya Kingdom, the forerunner of modern-day Thailand.

Year 1351 (MCCCLI) was a common year starting on Saturday of the Julian calendar.

== Events ==
=== January–March ===
- January 14 – Edward III of England institutes the Treason Act 1351, defining treason in English law. It remains unrepealed into the 21st century.
- February 2 – Hook and Cod wars: William of Bavaria, aspirant to the title of Count of Holland, is rescued from imprisonment at Burbant Castle in Ath by Gerard van Herlaar and Gerard van Merxem, and joins the Cod faction.
- February 9 – The English Parliament is opened by King Edward III of England for a 20-day session.
- March 1 – The English Parliament adjourns after 20 days and the laws passed during that time are given royal assent by King Edward III, including the Statute of Labourers Act to respond to the shortage of labour shortage caused by the Black Death, and the Statute of Provisors to prevent the Pope from appointing clergy to English benefices.
- March 4 – The Ayutthaya Kingdom is established by King Uthong (Ramathibodi I) in modern-day Thailand. He begins to propagate Theravada Buddhism as the state religion.
- March 23 – Firuz Shah Tughlaq succeeds Mohammad Tughlaq as ruler of the Delhi Sultanate. At this time, the Samma dynasty in Sindh (part of modern-day Pakistan) breaks away from the Sultanate.
- March 26 – War of the Breton Succession: The "Combat of the Thirty" takes place as the Kingdom of France and the Kingdom of England each select 30 knights and squires to fight a battle at Guillac, midway between the Breton castles of Josselin and Ploërmel, with the winning side to rule the disputed Duchy of Brittany. France kills 9 Englishmen, while England kills two French knights, with the Franco-Breton force winning the clash, considered by later historians to be the most notable example of the knights' code of chivalry.

=== April–June ===
- April 1 – Hundred Years' War: Battle of Saintes. – The French are defeated by the English.
- April 8 – Hundred Years' War: Battle of Taillebourg. – The French are defeated by the English.
- May 1 – The Canton of Zürich becomes the fifth member state of the Swiss Confederacy as the citizens of Zurich swear allegiance to the Confederacy in fron of representatives of the cantons of Lucerne, Schwyz, Uri and Unterwalden. Rudolf Brun, Mayor of Zurich, signs a treaty of allegiance with the Confederacy, represented by Johann von Attinghausen.
- May 28 –
  - In Yuan dynasty China, the arrest of Han Shantong, a leader of the Buddhist White Lotus sect, in Yingzhou, sparks a peasant uprising in the Anhui Province, whose soldiers are declared by their new leader Liu Futong to be the Red Turban (hongiin jun) rebels.The Red Turbans identify thmesleves by wearing red scarves around their heads, and the rebellion spreads to other areas, starting with Xuzhou in Jiangsu province in August, and in the provinces of Hubei, Jiangxi and Hubei by the end of the year.
  - The sixth and final session of the Fifth Council of Constantinople takes place among the bishops of the Eastern Orthodox Church at the Palace of Blachernae. The criticisms by Gregory Akindynos and other opponents of the theology of Gregory Palamas are condemned as heresy and the opposition is brought to an end, with the opponents excommunicated
- May 30 – Hook and Cod wars: The four-day Battle of Veere, fought between the Hook faction of Margaret, Countess of Holland and the Cod faction of William V, her son and challenger to the title, is won by the Hooks, giving the Hooks control of the county of Zeeland.

=== July–September ===
- July 5 – Hook and Cod wars: The forces of Margaret, Countess of Holland, are defeated by those of William of Bavaria, at the naval battle of Zwartewaal on the Oude Maas of the Rhine river.
- July 31 – War of the Straits: The Republic of Genoa, having increased the size of its navy in order to fight against the Republic of Venice and its allies in Aragon and Byzantium, dispatches 60 ships under the command of Adrmiral Paganino Doria, each with at least 180 men on board, to enter the War.
- August 15 – King Lajos of Hungary offers to make a peacce treaty with the Grand Duke of Lithuania, Kęstutis pledging to accept the Christianization of Lithuania, and the Grand Duchy providing military aid to Hungary, in exchange for a royal crown and recognition of Lithuania as an independent nation. Although Kęstutis shows his acceptance by the pagan ritual of throwing a knife to kill a bull and arranges to travel to the Hungarian capital of Buda, he never attempts to comply with the terms and the deal is never finalized.
- August 17 – Hook and Cod wars: William of Bavaria, leader of the Cod faction, begins the siege of Zierikzee, located in the Netherlands county of Zeeland, but offers a truce to the city of Zierikzee four days later and suspends all fighting on August 21, granting Zierikzee 40 days of peace. Under the terms of the offer, if William's mother and opponent, Margaret of Hainault, asks Zierikzee's aid before Ocrtober 2 in fighting for the Hook faction, fighting will resume. If Margaret does not do so, then the city council of Zierikzee agrees to support the Cod faction and to accept William as their lord.
- August 21 – As-Salih Salih becomes the new Sultan of Egypt by overthrowing his half-brother, Al-Nasir Hasan, wit the help of the Emir Taz al-Nasiri.
- September 18 – Siemowit III, Duke of Masovia and his co-regent, Casimir I, Duke of Warsaw, recognize the jurisdiction of Casimir the Great, King of Poland,over Warsaw. In return, they receive the Duchy of Plock, with Duke Casimir receiving the city of Sochaczew and Duke Siemowit getting Gostynin.
- September 26 – Hook and Cod wars: An alliance and mutual defense treaty is signed by representatives of twelve Dutch cities (Amsterdam, Rotterdam, Delft, Leiden, Haarlem, Dordrecht, Alkmaar, Medemblik, Oudewater, Geertruidenberg, Schiedam and Vlaardingen) that support the Cod faction.

=== October–December ===
- October 2 – Hook and Cod wars: The deadline set by William of Bavaria for the city of Zierikzee expires without Margaret of Hainault attempting to bring the city to the Hook side, and Zierikzee pledges its allegiance to William of Bavaria and the cod side.
- October 4 – Hook and Cod wars: The siege of Geertruidenberg Castle, occupied by a member of the Hook faction, Philips I, Lord of Polanen, is started by John IV, Lord of Arkel of the Cod faction. The siege will continue for 10 months before Polanen's surrender on August 15, 1352.
- November 3 – In what is now North Korea, King Chungjeong, the figurehead ruler of the Kingdom of Goryeo, controlled by Yuan dynasty China, is deposed by order of the Chinese Emperor. He is replaced by his uncle, Gongmin, and sent into exile.
- November 22 – Emperor Sukō, the third Emperor of the Northern Court of Japan, abdicates as the shogun Ashikaga Takauji returns to allegiance to the Southern Court and a truced between the two dynasties is observed. The halt in fighting will last for six months before a major attack is made on the northern capital, Kyoto, by the Southern Court.
- December 24 – Rudolf Brun, Mayor of Zurich, attempts a surprise attack on the Habsburg city of Baden in the Canton of Aargau, but the enemy troops are informed before the plan can be carried out, and retreat behind the city's walls. Unable to invade the city, the Zurich troops burn down the facilities for Baden's famous hot springs, plunder the Siggental area of the canton along the Aare river and destroy Freudenau Castle on Christmas Day, and overwhelm the Habsburgs in a battle at Dättwil on December 26.

=== Date unknown ===
- The region of Vantaa in Finland is first mentioned (as Helsinge).

== Births ==
- October 16 – Gian Galeazzo Visconti, first Duke of Milan (d. 1402)
- November 1 – Leopold III, Duke of Austria (d. 1386)
- Princess Joan of France (d. 1371)
- probable – Władysław II Jagiełło, Grand Duke of Lithuania and King of Poland (d. 1434)

== Deaths ==
- February 13 – Kō no Morofuyu, Japanese general
- March 20 – Muhammad bin Tughluq, Sultan of Delhi
- March 25
  - Kō no Moronao, Japanese samurai
  - Kō no Moroyasu, Japanese samurai
- May 24 – Abu al-Hasan Ali ibn Othman, Sultan of Morocco (b. 1297)
- June 20 – Margareta Ebner, German nun (b. 1291)
- November 15 – Joanna of Pfirt, duchess consort of Austria
