= John I of Polanen =

Lord of Polanen and De Lek

John I, Lord of Polanen
- Polanen coat of arms
- Born: c. 1285
- Died: 26 September 1342 (aged 56–57)
- Buried: Monster, South Holland
- Noble family: House of Polanen
- Father: Philips III van Duivenvoorde
- Mother: Elisabeth van Vianen

John I, Lord of Polanen (c. 1285 – 26 September 1342) was Lord of Polanen, and Lord of De Lek.

== Life ==
John was a son of Philips III van Duivenvoorde (?-c. 1308) and Elisabeth van Vianen. Philips got the fief Polanen in Monster, South Holland in 1295. This was made inheritable by sons and daughters. John had a sister Kerstine and a bastard brother Willem van Duvenvoorde.

=== Lord of Polanen ===
Upon the death of his father, John I became Lord of Polanen Castle. In his early years, John got help from his uncle Diederik van der Wale. In 1311 John got possession of a windmill in Monster. In the early 1320s he got possession of tithes in Monster, Delft, Maasland, and Schipluiden. The help of his half-brother helped John a lot. In 1326, he got the lordships of Krimpen aan de Merwede, Krimpen aan den IJssel, Ouderkerk, and Zuidbroek in pawn.

=== Lord of Heemskerk ===
In 1327 John bought Oud Haerlem Castle and the lordships (ambachtsheerlijkheden) of Heemskerk and Castricum. The price was only 100 pounds.

In 1328 John took part in the Battle of Cassel. He was probably knighted on that occasion. In 1329 he was mentioned as such, when he got a castle huis in De Lier and the promise that he could succeed to the lordship of Geertruidenberg and the office of castellan of Geertruidenberg Castle if his half brother would die without legal issue.

John was bailiff of some areas for considerable time. In 1331 he was bailiff of Woerden, in 1331 and 1336 of Rijnland, and in 1339 he became bailiff of Kennemerland and West Friesland.

John and his wife had a tombstone in the choir of the church of Monster. The text on this stone was mentioned in a book. In print, the year MCCCXLII was rendered as MCCCXVII.

== Marriage and issue ==
In 1322 John married Catharina van Van Brederode (died 1372). They had:

- John II, Lord of Polanen.
- Philips I, Lord of Polanen.
- Dirk van Polanen
- Gerard van Polanen
- Heilwich van Polanen married Aernt van Arkel lord of Noordeloos
- Maria van Polanen married 1) Viscount Jan of Montfoort (-1345) 2) Gerrit van Heemstede

While John II succeeded his father as lord of Polanen, he gave the lordship of Polanen in arrear-fief to his younger brother Philips on 17 November 1345.
