= Philips I of Polanen =

Philips I, Lord of Polanen
- Polanen coat of arms
- Died: 4 May 1375
- Buried: probably Egmond Abbey
- Noble family: House of Polanen
- Father: John I, Lord of Polanen
- Mother: Catherine of Brederode

Philips I, Lord of Polanen (? - 4 May 1375) became Lord of Polanen in 1345. He later became Lord of Capelle, Nieuwerkerk , and Uyterlier. Philips was an important commander during the Hook and Cod wars.

== Family and titles ==
Philips was the second son of John I, Lord of Polanen (c. 1285 - 1342) and Catharina van Van Brederode. Philip's older brother John II made a fast career. In 1342, John got a more important fief than Polanen: the Lordship of the Lek (Heerlijkheid van de Lek). John therefore began to style himself as Lord of the Lek. Somewhat later, he gave the lordship of Polanen in arrear-fief to his younger brother Philips on 17 November 1345.

== Career ==
Philips was bailiff of South Holland in 1348. In 1350 he was a knight. In July 1350 his uncle Willem van Duvenvoorde made some dispositions about his goods after his death. Philips older brother John got Geertruidenberg, Geertruidenberg Castle, and other possessions. Philips got Capelle Castle, with the lordships of Capelle and Nieuwerkerke, and a number of tithes to hold in arrear fief from his older brother. He also got Uiterliere.

When the first of the Hook and Cod wars erupted in 1350, Philips was on the Hook side. It led to a siege and destruction of Polanen Castle and the destruction of Capelle Castle. Philips was not present during these sieges, as he commanded the important Geertruidenberg Castle. He put up a long defence during the Siege of Geertruidenberg Castle. In the end he surrendered the castle with all defenders getting a guarantee for their possessions or an indemnity.

In 1355 Philips got back his possessions from the Count of Holland, at least he got back Polanen. After Albert I, Duke of Bavaria became regent of Holland in 1358, Philips came back into favor and made a career in the Holland government. In 1366 Philips became part of the count's council. From 1366 to 1371, Philips was the chief knight of the hotel of the countess.

Philips died on 4 May 1375. He was probably buried in Egmond Abbey.

== Marriage and issue ==
In 1359 Philips married Lizebette Lady van der Made, and had:

- Philips II van Polanen
- Elisabet married to Hugo van Heenvliet
- Catherina married to Jan van Buren
