= John II of Polanen =

John II, Lord of Polanen
- Polanen coat of arms
- Born: c. 1325
- Died: 3 November 1378
- Buried: Church of Our Lady in Breda
- Noble family: House of Polanen
- Father: John I, Lord of Polanen
- Mother: Catherine of Brederode

John II, Lord of Polanen (c. 1325 – 3 November 1378 in Breda) was Lord of Polanen, Lord of De Lek and Lord of Breda.

== Known as Lord of Polanen, Lord of the Lek, and Lord of Breda ==
In late Medieval times, noblemen were generally known for the most important fief that they held. In turn, they would name themselves after this fief. John was the second lord of Polanen, a fief centered on Polanen Castle. As long as John's most important fief was Polanen, he was known as John of Polanen.

In 1342, John of Polanen acquired the lordship of the Lek (Heerlijkheid van de Lek). This was obviously more important than Polanen, because John now began to be called Lord of the Lek (Heer van de Lek).

When John became lord of Breda, he became the first Jan of Breda, hence John I of Breda. As he lost Polanen in 1351 and did not get it back, it became usual to refer to him as Jan I.

== Life ==
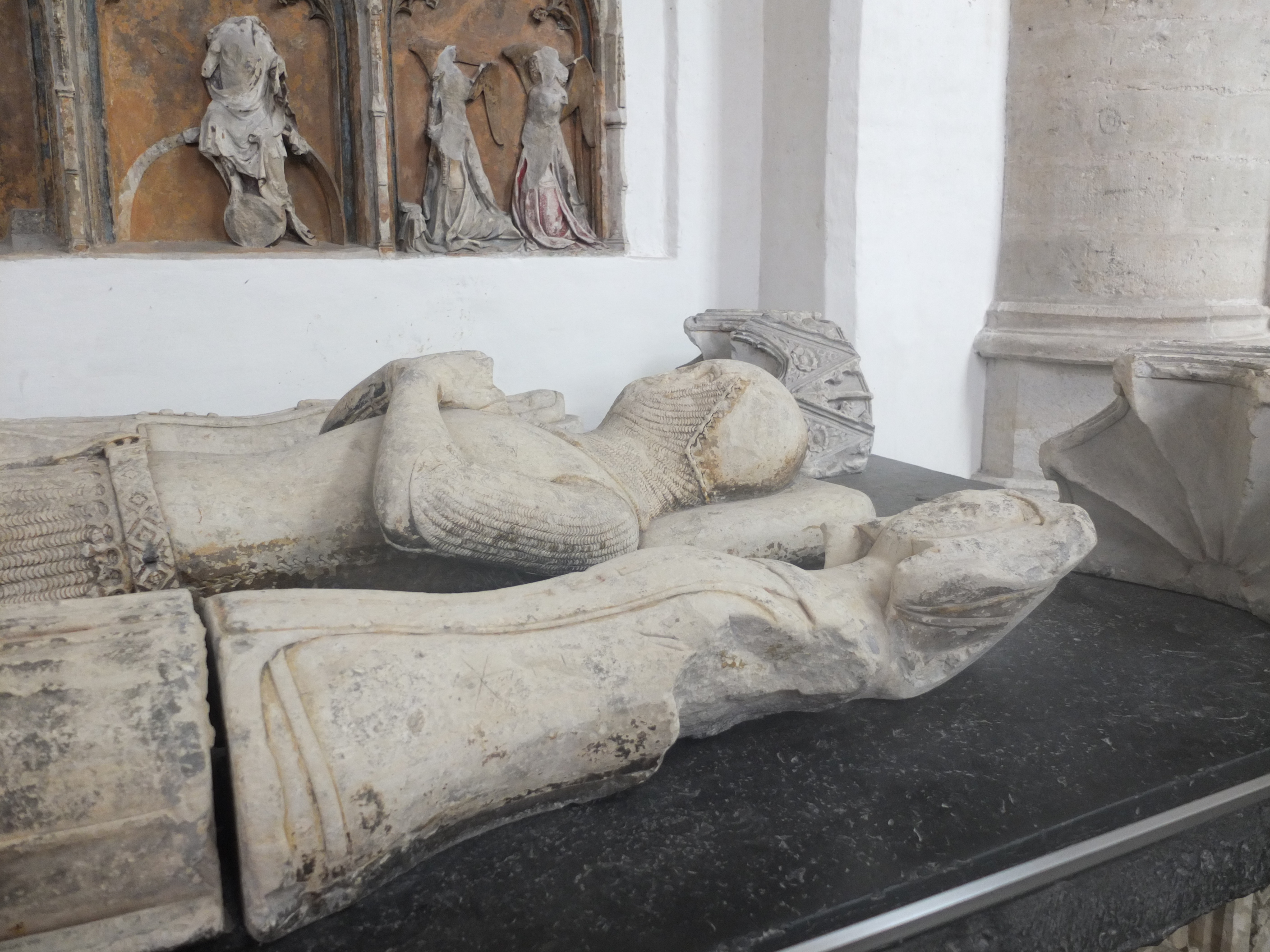
Monument of John II in Grote Kerk (Breda)

He was a son of John I, Lord of Polanen and Catherine of Brederode. Polanen Castle near Monster was the ancestral seat of the family. In 1327 John I had acquired Oud Haerlem Castle. In 1339, John II purchased the Lordship of Breda and built Breda Castle, together with his father.

John succeeded his father in 1342 and also took over his father's position as councilor of the Count of Holland and Zeeland. In the autumn of 1343, he accompanied Count William IV on a pilgrimage to the Holy Land. He also participated in a crusade against the Prussians. He was not present in the September 1345 campaign against the Frisians, which saw William IV killed during the disastrous Battle of Warns. On 17 November 1345, John II granted Polanen Castle in arrear fief to his younger brother Philip I of Polanen.

=== First phase of the Hook and Cod Wars ===
William of Duivenvoorde and his nephew John II were leaders of what would become known as the 'Hook' party during the Hook and Cod wars. In 1350, they travelled to Hainaut to pay homage to Countess Margaret II. Somewhere between 1347 and 1350, John was appointed Burgrave of Geertruidenberg. In 1350, he purchased the Land of Breda for 43000 florins from John III, Duke of Brabant. He also acquired high justice over Breda.

The Hook and Cod wars started in earnest in about March 1351. Polanen Castle was besieged for 2 weeks and then demolished. Oud Haerlem Castle was taken after a siege which lasted more than 6 months, even though John van not present. The Siege of Geertruidenberg Castle lasted from October 1351 to August 1352. Here John's brother Philip commanded as his lieutenant. As a result of the war John lost the Lordship of De Lek.

=== During the regency of Albert of Bavaria ===
In 1358, Albert of Bavaria became regent of Holland for his brother. This was good for the members of the old Hook faction. In 1358 John was somewhat compensated for his losses with other fiefs and possessions.

=== In Brabant ===
Whatever the later events in Holland, John seems to have concentrated his efforts on extending his holdings in the Breda area. It made him more of a Brabant than a Holland lord.

John II was captured during the 1371 Battle of Baesweiler. He was released several months later, after his relatives had paid a ransom. In 1375, he was appointed stadtholder of the Great Holme.

John II died in 1378 and was buried in the Church of Our Lady in Breda.

== Marriages and issue ==
John II of Polanen married three times.

In 1340, he married Oda of Horne-Altena (1318-1353), daughter of Willem IV of Horne. They had three children:

- John III, his heir
- Beatrice (c. 1344 – 1394); married Henry VIII, the son of Henry VII, Lord of Bautershem, who was also Lord of Bergen op Zoom as Henry I, and his wife, Maria Merxheim, Lady of Wuustwezel and Brecht
- Oda (c. 1351 – 15th century), married Henry III, Burgrave of Montfoort

In 1353, he married Matilda (c. 1324 – 1366), an illegitimate daughter of John III, Duke of Brabant. They had two sons:

- Dirck of the Leck (d. 1416), married Gilisje of Cralingen. He was outlawed for a while, because he was suspected of having participated in the murder of Aleid van Poelgeest
- Henry of the Leck (d. 1427), married Jeanne of Ghistelles, and was a councillor of Countess Jacqueline of Holland

In 1370, he married Margaret, a daughter of Otto, Lord of Lippe and Irmgard of the Marck. They had one son:

- Otto (d. before 20 October 1428), married before 1396 to Sophia, a daughter of Count Frederick III of Bergh-'s-Heerenberg and Catherine of Buren

== Legacy ==
The mummified cat Polleke that was placed inside the walls of the Grote Kerk in Breda, Netherlands was partly named after him in 2025.

== Sources ==
- H.M. Brokken: Het ontstaan van de Hoekse en Kabeljauwse twisten, p. 414 and footnote 139 on page 227
- Vereeniging tot Uitgaaf der Bronnen van het Oud-Vaderlandsche Recht: Werken, issue 17, Kemink, 1956
- Van Mieris, Frans (1754), Groot charterboek der graaven van Holland, van Zeeland, en heeren van Vriesland, vol. II, Pieter vander Eyk, Leyden
- Van Vliet, Adri P. (2000), "Polanen. Een middeleeuws kasteel in Monster" (PDF), Historisch Jaarboek Westland, no. 13, Historische Vereniging Holland, pp. 47–63

John II of Polanen House of Wassenaer Born: c. 1325 Died: 3 November 1378
Preceded by John as Duke of Brabant	Baron of Breda; 1339-1378	Succeeded by John III
Preceded by John I	Lord of Polanen; 1342-1378	Succeeded by John III
Preceded by John I	Lord of De Lek; 1342-1378	Succeeded by Dirck
