= Zuidbroek, South Holland =

Hamlet in South Holland, the Netherlands

Coordinates: 51.936°N 4.725°E

Zuidbroek is a hamlet in the Dutch province of South Holland. It is located about 8 km south of the city of Gouda, in the municipality of Bergambacht.

Zuidbroek was a separate municipality between 1817 and 1857, when it became part of Bergambacht.
