= Oud Haerlem Castle =

Former castle in Heemskerk, Netherlands

- Kasteel Oud Haerlem
- Heemskerk, the Netherlands
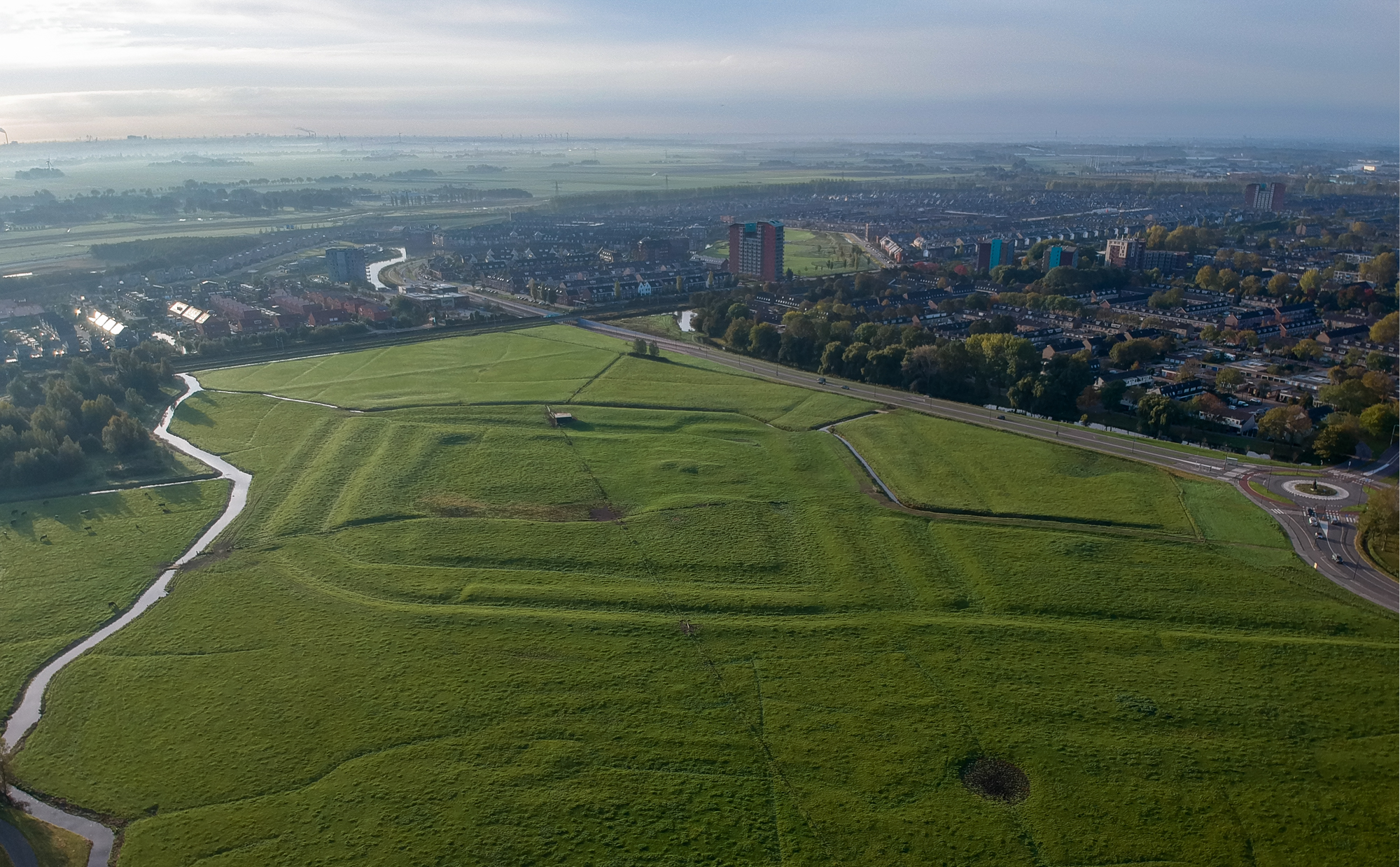
- Site of Oud Haerlem Castle October 2018

Site information
- Type: Castle

Location
- North Holland
- Coordinates: 52.500799°N 4.688197°E

Site history
- Built: 1248
- Demolished: 1351
- Battles/wars: Siege of 1351

Oud Haerlem Castle was a very strong castle in Holland. In 1351 it was demolished after a long siege.

== Location ==
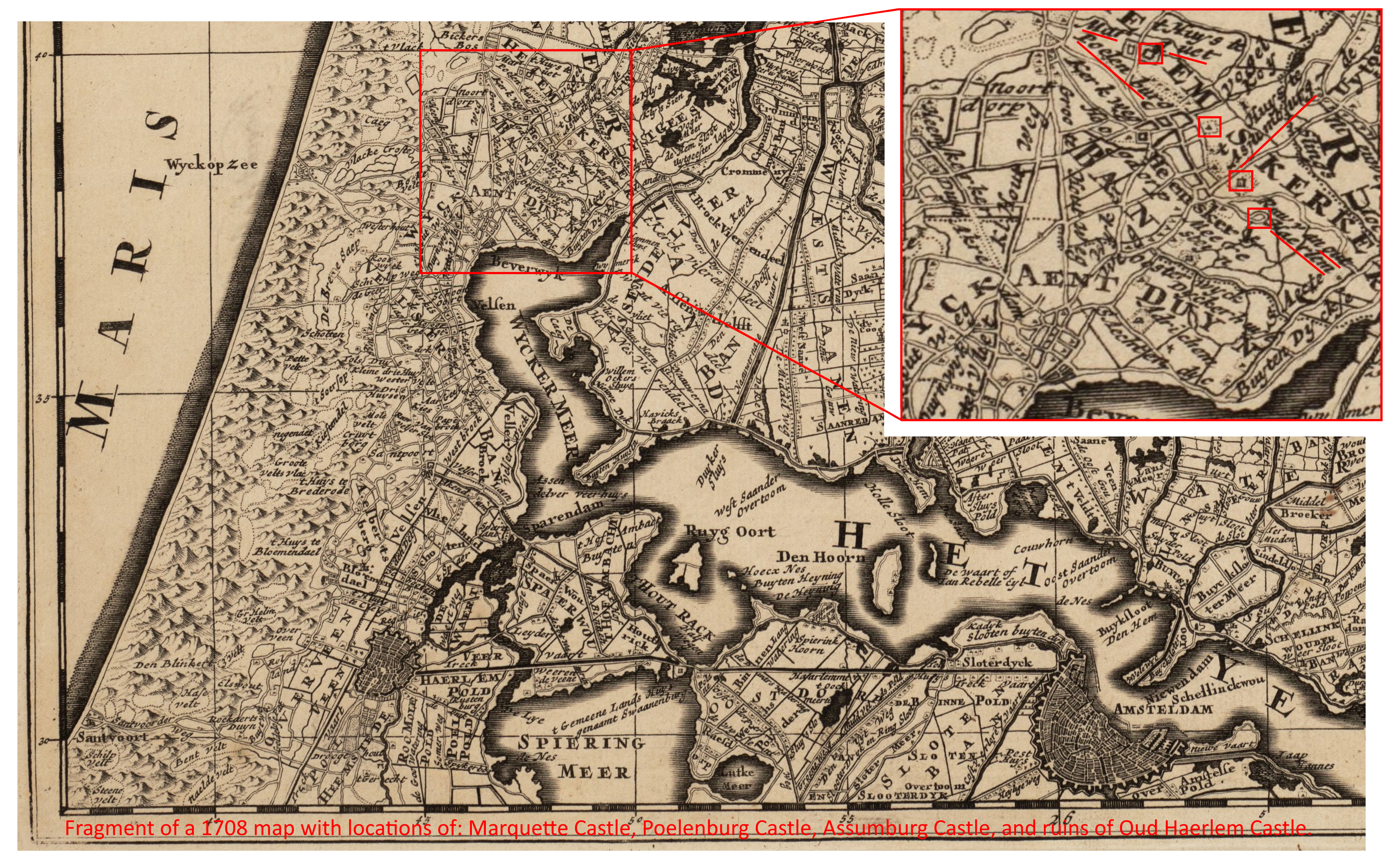
Castles near Heemskerk.

The location of Oud Haerlem castle is on the eastern fringe of what is now Heemskerk, just west of Amsterdam. It is 400 meter south-southeast of Assumburg Castle, which probably also dates from the thirteenth century, but was much smaller at the time. Somewhat further north northwest of Assumburg was Poelenburg Castle, of which nothing remains. About three kilometer north northwest of Oud Haerlem is Marquette Castle, which used to be called Heemskerk Castle. Marquette Castle was a large round water castle, of which only later, more square parts remain.

The unusually high concentration of castles in the area has been related to the contemporary geography of the area. The 1708 map still shows how the IJ reached far inland in medieval times. It continued in the now disappeared Wijkermeer, and left only the dunes and a very narrow strip of land to connect the parts of Holland north and south of the IJ. It is supposed that the counts of Holland wanted to create a defensive line on this narrow strip of land, so they could stop invasions from West Friesland further to the north.

== Castle Characteristics ==
=== The main castle ===
The main castle was not discovered before 2019. It consisted of a very large square castle of at least 45 by 45 meter. This probably had round towers on all corners, but this is not entirely certain for all corners. Inside the main castle were many wings or buildings. The details are not known, but it seems these were on the inside of all 4 four walls.

The size of the main castle is an aspect that makes it special. At 45 by 45 meter, the square castle is about twice the size of the square castles Ammersoyen Castle at 27 by 25 m and Muiden Castle (32*35). It is also significantly larger than Medemblik Castle (37*40) and Helmond Castle (35*35).

The construction date of the main castle has been put to the mid-thirteenth century. This date was deduced from pottery from that period, which was found during works at the place of the main castle in 2000-2001. If so, the construction date of the main castle moves back the date of the appearance of the square castle in Holland to before the reign of Floris V, Count of Holland (reign 1266-1296).

=== The outer bailey ===
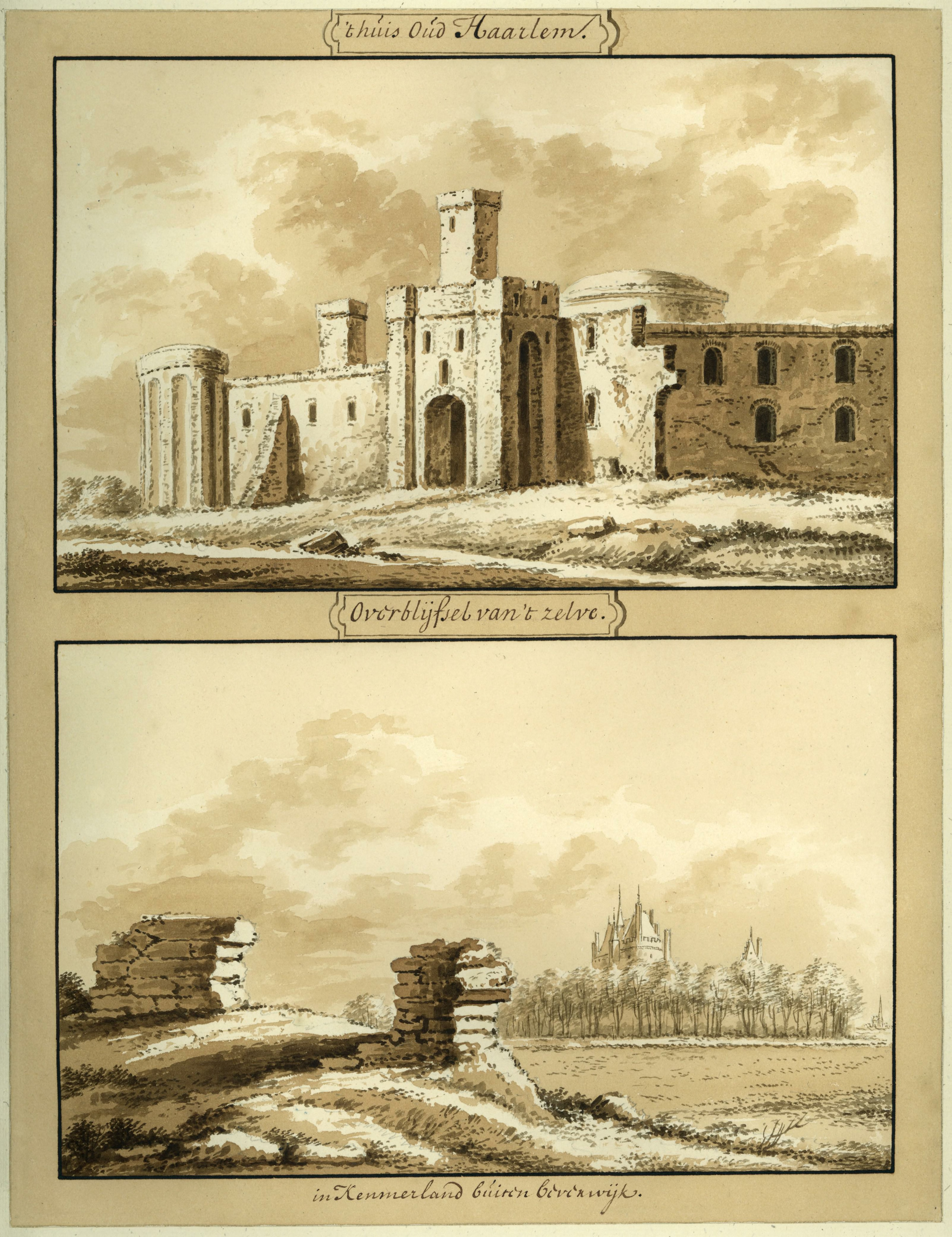
c. 1720 impression

The outer bailey of Oud Haerlem Castle was an almost rectangular structure, with one tower sticking out on the southeast corner. In the center is an elevation with very much debris. In reconstructions, a donjon was supposed to have been present there. In the northwest quarter, there was a 7 by 10 meter structure, probably a building. Note that before the main castle was discovered, the outer bailey was thought to be the main castle. Hence impressions like the one made in 2011.

=== The voorhof ===
The Dutch word voorhof literally translates like 'before court'. In Dutch it can apply to a terrain enclosed by defensive walls, and then translates as 'outer bailey'. It can also apply to a terrain only enclosed by water or a simple enclosure. In the rare cases that a castle has an outer bailey and a terrain without clear defensive walls, the Dutch are apt to apply voorburg (outer bailey) to the fortified terrain and voorhof to the unfortified terrain.

The voorhof of Oud Haerlem was massive. It was a terrain which enclosed the whole main castle, and about half of the outer bailey. On the northern part of the voorhof were three structures, most probably buildings. One of these was quite large, about 30 by 17 meters. On the southeast corner of the voorhof was a round structure which might have been a defensive tower or a wind mill on top of (such) a tower. In the middle of the south side there was an outward bridge.

=== Formidable defensive perimeter ===
While the castle and outer bailey were large, they are not that exceptional. In contrast, the defensive perimeter of these buildings was exceptional. Aerial photographs of the area give the impression of a Roman Legion's camp, and confirm the archaeological investigations.

The investigations showed an '8'-formed moat around the main castle and outer bailey. The western part of this moat was part of a large moat which surrounded the main castle, outer bailey and voorhof. Outside of this moat was a narrow strip of land surrounded by a second complete moat. At least on the south, west and east side, this pattern was repeated. Therefore, in order to reach the main castle 3-5 moats had to be passed. This seems extreme, but is still visible on site.

== History ==
=== The castle is built ===
In about 1248 several castles were built near Heemskerk and Beverwijk by order of count William II of Holland. Oud Haerlem Castle was one of these. At the time it was called Het huys tot Heemskerck. The name Oud Haerlem dates from after the destruction of the castle.

=== The first lords of Oud Haerlem ===
In 1248 Simon van Haerlam and his brother in law Wouter van Egmond, knights, bought the count's fief 'Hofland', a very large estate. The name 'Van Haerlem' means 'from Haarlem', not 'lord of Haarlem'. Simon then moved to Heemskerk, and gave the plot of his house in Haarlem to the Carmelites, who founded a convent on it. Sijmon was also the first ambachtsheer of Heemskerk, which means that he had some authority that is now mostly handled by the municipality and lower judges. Sijmon died in 1280, and was succeeded by his son Willem. Next came Willem's nephew Jan van Bergen, who died in 1321. The castle then reverted to the counts of Holland.

=== Van Polanen ===
In 1327 Oud Haerlem Castle was sold to John I, Lord of Polanen (c. 1285-1342), with the condition that it would be an open house for the count. John was a half brother of his father's natural son Willem van Duvenvoorde (1290-1353), financer and favorite of successive counts of Holland. The price of only 100 pounds, seems a bit low, and probably had to do with Van Duvenvoorde's influence.

The next lord was John II, Lord of Polanen (c. 1325-1378). He was a favorite of Margaret II, Countess of Hainaut, and got the Huyse dat geheeten es te Hairlem with the high jurisdiction.

=== Siege and destruction of the castle ===
In the Hook and Cod wars Van Duvenvoorde and the Polanen's belonged to the top of the Hook party. In February 1351 Count William of Bavaria (William V of Holland) returned to Holland. Soon after, fighting started in earnest. William started with a campaign against the castles of the Hook faction.

While most of the Hook castles fell quickly, this was not the case at Oud Haerlem. The siege is estimated to have lasted up to 11 months. It is known that siege equipment, one or more blijdes or trebuchets were used. The long siege ended with an assault.

=== The ruins ===
After the siege, most of the castle was razed. In 1379 there is a reference to a terrain where the castle used to be. In 1551, it is described as the terrain where the castle used to be, with inner- and outer bailey, double moats and singels.

All this time, the ruins were used as a quarry. It led to repeated protests of the owners, who wanted to get paid for the stones. Meanwhile the ruins were drawn by several artists. In 1866 an enormous part of the terrain was quarried to get stones for the restoration of Brederode Castle. In the 1970s the terrain became a national monument.

== Archeological investigations ==
=== Excavations at the outer bailey ===
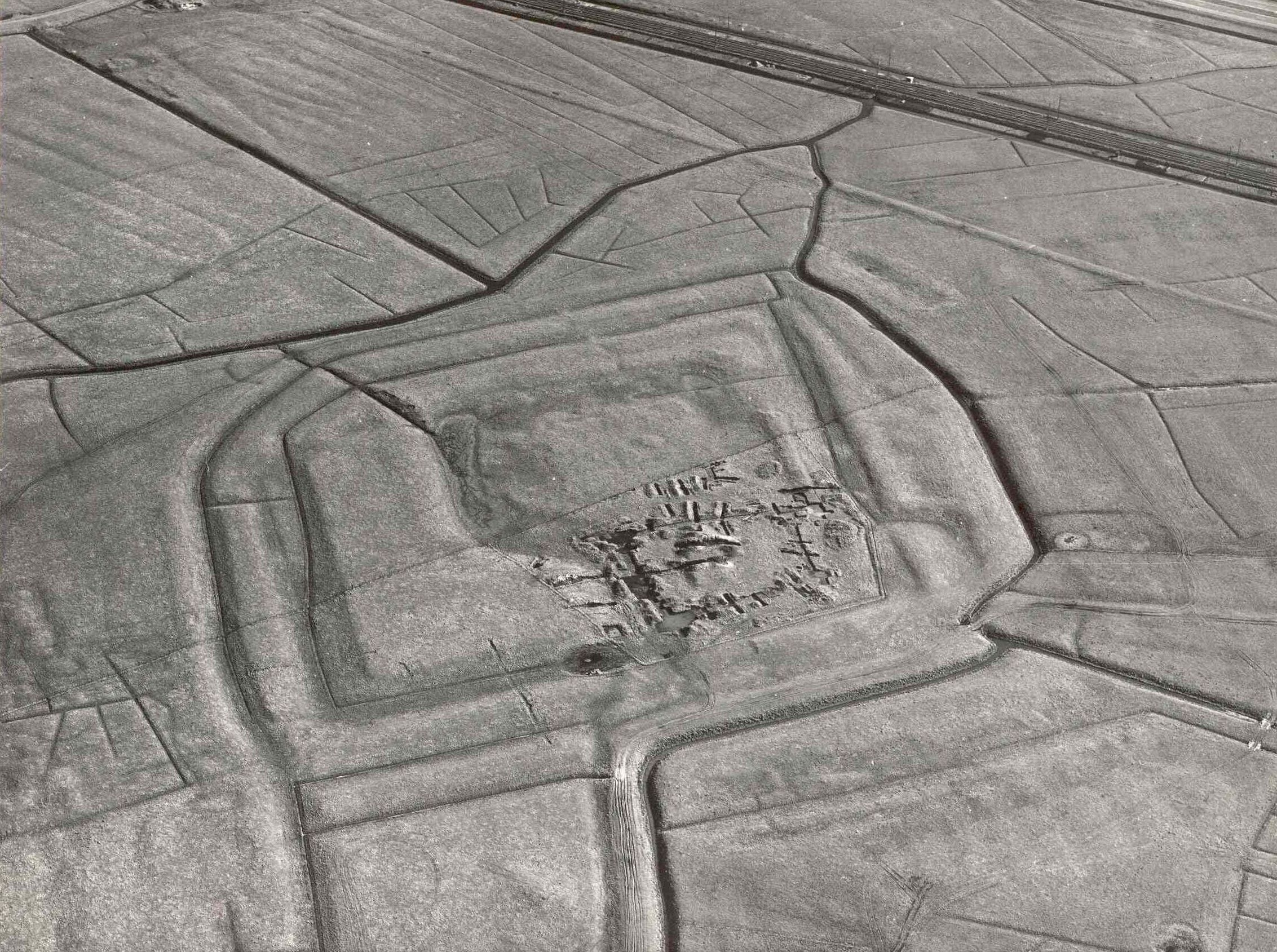
Excavation of outer bailey of the castle by Jaap Renaud in 1960

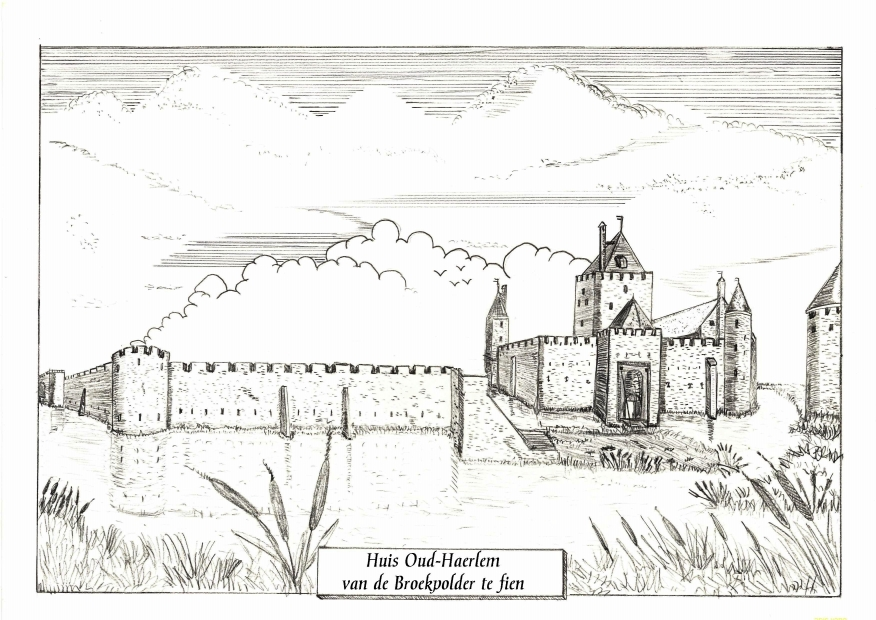
2011 outer bailey impression

In 1943 Jaap Renaud led a very short investigation on the terrain of Oud Haerlem Castle. Between 1960 and 1962 Renaud led more serious excavations on what is now seen as the outer bailey of the castle. The excavation was not complete, but relied on trenches dug through the terrain.

Renaud found a castle with an almost rectangular floor plan. It had two round towers on the western corners, a square (gate?) tower in the center of the northern side, and a protruding square tower on the southeast side. Renaud qualified this terrain as the outer bailey of Oud Haerlem Castle, and supposed that the main castle was just east of it.

Renaud's investigation was never properly elaborated. An attempt to do so failed in the 1980s. After Renaud's death important material surfaced, and in 2010 archaeologists Jean Roefstra and E.H.P. Cordfunke started to study the material again. One of the things they found, is that the compass arrow on the map published by Renaud was wrong. What they furthermore found, was a small moat around the still existing elevation inside the terrain of the outer bailey. This small moat was also mentioned by Renaud, but he had refuted its existence. The moat was shown to have been filled in the 13th century. Pottery findings showed mid-thirteenth century pottery around the elevation, and late thirteenth and fourteenth century pottery around the wall of the outer bailey.

The conclusion of Roefstra study of Renaud's excavation, and later finds, was that the castle started out as a tower house or donjon on the elevation on the outer bailey in the mid-thirteenth century, probably built by Simon van Haerlem. His successors filled the moat around the donjon and constructed a ring wall or enceinte, with an entrance in the square tower protruding on the southeast side. The small square tower in the middle of the north wall provided access to the outer bailey. In this interpretation the outer bailey is the main castle.

=== 2019-2021 investigations ===
In 2019 a preliminary investigation was done to find out the most effective technique to investigate the area without actually digging. The investigators tried ground-penetrating radar (GPR), magnetometry (MAG), and electromagnetic induction (EMI). These are all techniques that can find structures in the terrain. Both MAG and EMI proved very effective, especially because of the combination with geopositioning technology. Meanwhile, use of the Actueel Hoogtebestand Nederland with some software revealed a very large 45 by 45 m square castle structure, which is now considered to be the main castle.

The investigators did not immediately arrive at the conclusion that the large structure was the main castle. In June 2020, they still thought that they had found the outer bailey that Renaud could not find.

In the 2021 final report the conclusion was different. Both EMI and MAG showed a complex structure of wings and or buildings on the newly found structure, leading to the conclusion that the 45 by 45 m structure was the main castle. That is, at the time of the destruction of the castle in 1351. It does not contradict Roefstra's earlier theory about the evolution of the castle.

=== The bronze treasure of Oud Haerlem ===
In the early 1960s Renaud found what is still the largest medieval bronze treasure of the Netherlands. It consists of 15 large well crafted objects. Fearing looters, Renaud never revealed the exact location, which was only recovered in a private archive after his death in 2007. Renaud also applied this discretion to his other findings at Oud Haarlem. He was right about this. Real estate developers made all kinds of plans for the terrain in the 1990s, including the construction of a golf course. In spite of the terrain's status as a national monument, the municipality agreed to these plans. The 79 year old Renaud had to personally intervene to stop these plans.
