= Battle of Zwartewaal =

Battle of the Hook and Cod Wars; involving England

Coordinates: 51.91°N 4.34°E

- Part of Hook and Cod wars
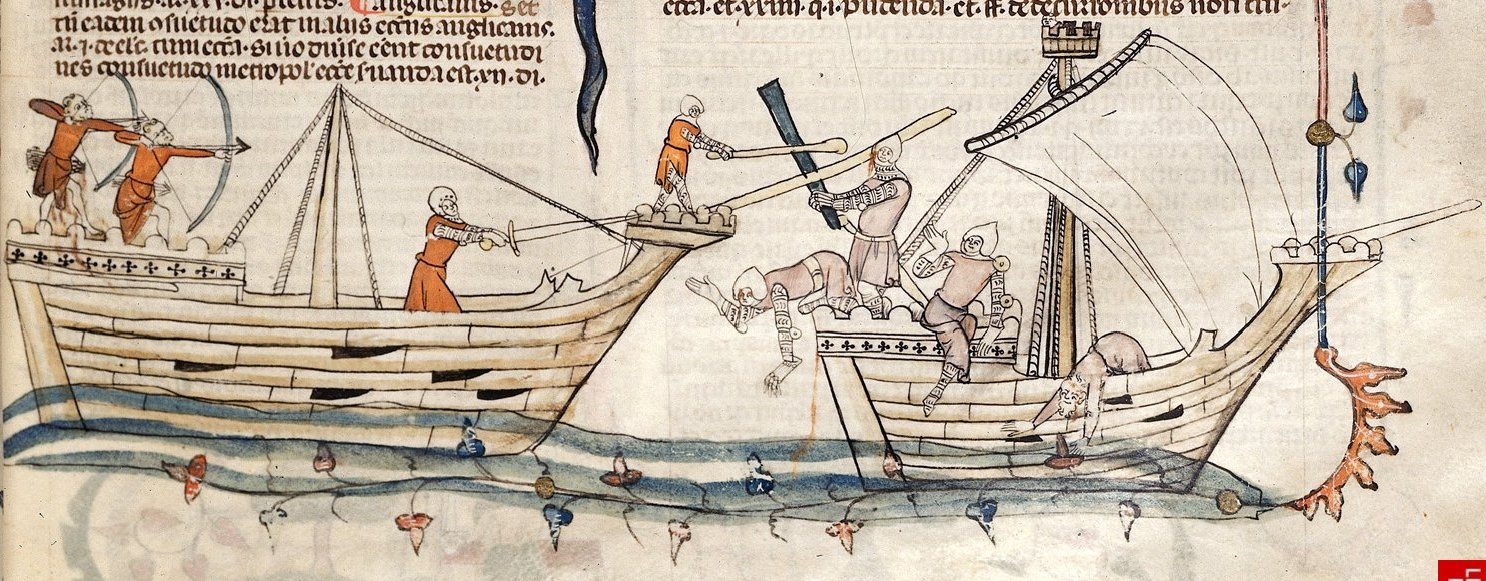
- Naval war in the 14th century
Date	3-5 July 1351
Location	Zwartewaal, County of Holland
Result	Cod faction victory
Territorial changes	William V grasps control of Holland and Zeeland

Belligerents
Hook faction England	Cod faction

Commanders and leaders
Margaret, Countess of Hainaut; Edward III of England	William V of Holland

The Battle of Zwartewaal (or Battle near Vlaardingen) was a decisive naval battle during the Hook and Cod wars.

== Context ==
The first phase of the Hook and Cod wars was fought between William I, Duke of Bavaria and his mother Margaret, Countess of Hainaut. At the time William was commonly known as William of Bavaria, or William the waiting. Later he became known as William V of Holland. He would be supported by the Cod party. Margaret, Countess of Hainaut was also the acknowledged Countess of Holland and Zeeland. All of which was to be inherited by her son. She was supported by the Hook party. William was lieutenant for his mother in Holland and Zeeland. After a first attempt to seize power from his mother in Holland, William was placed in confinement in Hainault.

In February 1351 some Cod nobles freed William of Bavaria from Burbant Castle in Ath and brought him to Holland. William then formally allied himself with the Cod party, which acknowledged him as their count. He also allied with the Bishop of Utrecht. While Dordrecht, Middelburg and Zierikzee allied with Margaret, William was acknowledged by Kennemerland and West-Friesland. In April 1351 Margaret moved to Calais to seek English help. William then seized Dordrecht, the most important city of Holland. Albert and the Cod party held almost all the cities, and next started a campaign against the many castles that were held by their Hook opponents.

== English intervention ==
Edward III of England had economic interests in the Low Countries. Margaret was prepared to temporary appoint him as 'guardian' of Holland and Zeeland in return for his support. In Zeeland towns like Middelburg and Zierikzee were in favor of close political relations with England, because they had so many economic ties with it.

Edward III had a mighty fleet, which recently gained victories in the 1340 Battle of Sluys and the August 1350 Battle of Winchelsea. An English Fleet was sent to Zeeland to join Margaret's party over there. In the May 1351 Battle of Veere this fleet defeated William's fleet. The whole of Zeeland then came under control of Margaret and the English.

== Battle at Zwartewaal ==
=== Location ===
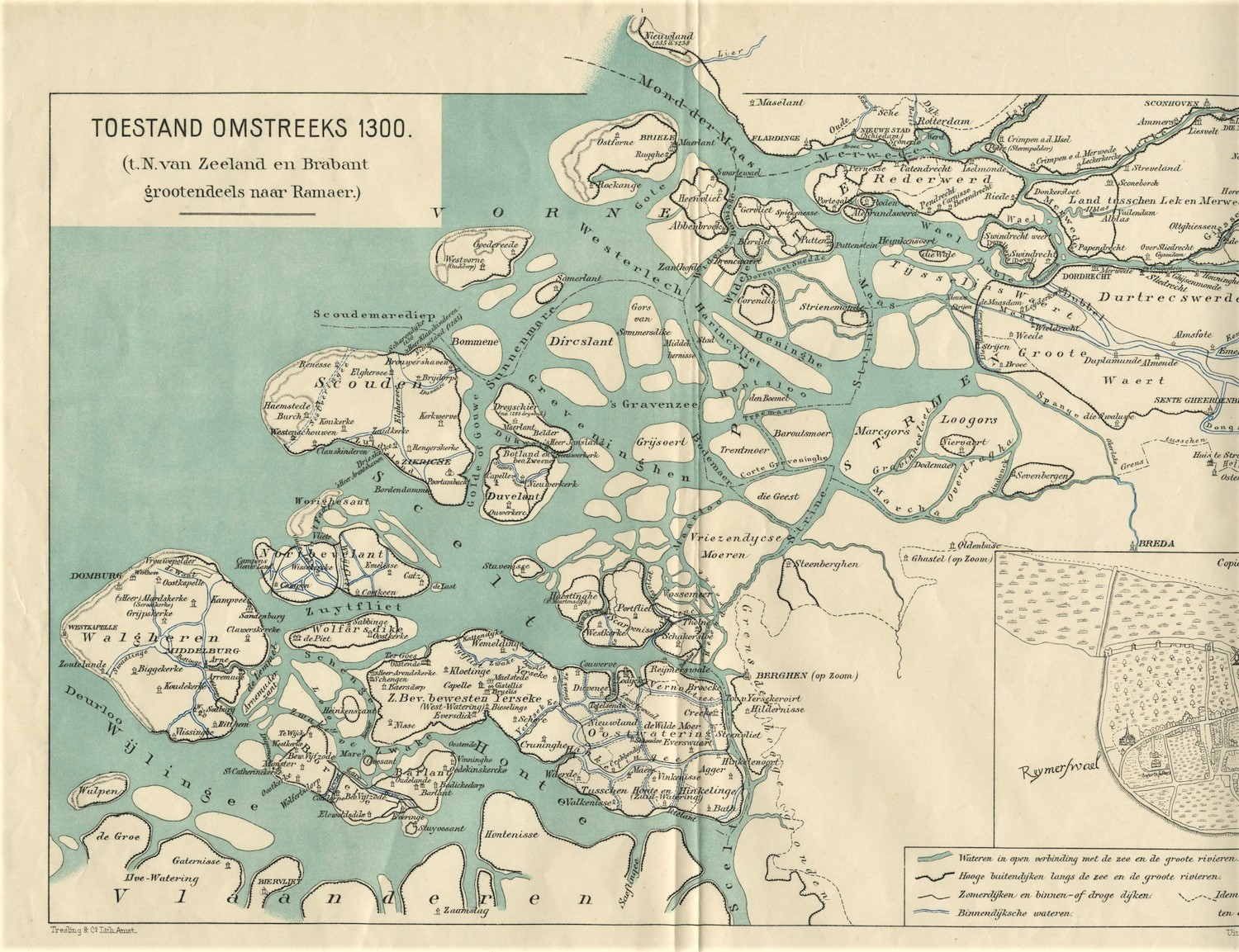
Reconstruction of the 1300 situation, Meuse on top

Zwartewaal is a town on the Oude Maas. Before the 1421 St. Elizabeth's flood much of the Meuse flowed to sea through the Oude Maas. Another part flowed further north through the Noord, and joined the Lek (main bed of the Rhine since 1122) to form the Nieuwe Maas known as 'Merwe' at the time. Since 1904 almost all Meuse water flows through the Bergse Maas, without ever reaching either the Oude Maas or Nieuwe Maas.

William of Bavaria actually referred to the battle as: den stride, die wy verwonnen up die Maze by den Zwerten Wale (the battle that we won on the Meuse near Zwartewaal).

=== Preparations ===
After his defeat at Veere William made thorough preparations for the next battle. He collected an army from Holland, Kennemerland and West-Friesland (now all in Holland). He was joined by Jan van Arkel, Lady Machteld van Voorne, Jan of Culemborg, Jan of Egmont, Gerrit of Heemskerk, Gerrit van Herlaer, and many lords and soldiers from Cleves, Guelders and upper Germany.

Margaret had soldiers from England, Hainault, Zeeland and Walcheren, amongst these many lords, barons, knights and squires.

=== Hook fleet sails up the Meuse ===
Margaret's fleet sailed to the mouth of the Meuse. On 4 July 1351 the fleets engaged each other not far from Brielle, west of Zwartewaal. The result was a Cod victory. Margaret escaped with some ships. Losses on the Hook side were heavy. The English admiral was killed. The Hook lords Kostyn of Renesse and Floris of Haamstede and many others were killed. Dirk van Brederode and many others were taken prisoner.

=== Result ===
The battle of Zwartewaal would prove decisive. Zeeland again submitted to William. Margaret hoped for English mediation, but by December 1351 she had only Geertruidenberg, Vredelant Castle on the border with Utrecht, and Oud Haerlem Castle left in Holland. William then made peace with England, and Margret only retained Hainault.
