= Willem van Duvenvoorde =

Willem van Duvenvoorde or van Duvoorde (c. 1290 – 12 August 1353), also known as Willem Snikkerieme, was a nobleman and financier who served as a financial and political adviser to four successive counts and countesses of Hainaut and Holland.

== Biography ==
Duvenvoorde was born c. 1290, the recognised bastard of Philip van Duvenvoorde, lord of Polanen and bailiff of Kennemerland, a member of the House of Wassenaer. In 1311, he became a squire in the household of William, Count of Hainaut and Holland, perhaps because the seneschal, Thierry van der Waele, was married to his aunt. From 1317, household records refer to him as chamberlain or treasurer, and from 1321 he was one of the count's leading advisers. He amassed substantial rewards in the service of the count, who was renowned for his liberality, and used these to engage in financial transactions that made him richer still. He provided loans at interest to the count of Hainaut and Holland, the count of Jülich, the duke of Brabant, the archbishop of Cologne, the bishops of Utrecht and Liège, and the king of England. As security he obtained the farm of tolls in Mechelen, Antwerp and Dordrecht, and property in Brussels.

In 1326, Duvenvoorde married Helwige van Vianen, heiress of an ancient but impoverished noble family. He fathered eight bastards but his wife remained childless, which led later historians to speculate that she may have refused her husband's advances as beneath her. He was knighted in 1328, perhaps at the Battle of Cassel, in which he took part, and on 11 August 1329 Louis IV, Holy Roman Emperor, granted him a patent of legitimisation.

Investing in land and lordships, he acquired extensive rights and possessions in the area south of Dordrecht, including seigneuries in Geertruidenberg (where he founded a Carthusian monastery), Dubbelmonde, Almonde, Drimmelen, Raamsdonk, Waspik, Munsterkerk, Zonzeel, Oosterhout and Dongen. He undertook diking and drainage works to make these lands more profitable, but also encouraged peat extraction from tidal lands on a scale that is likely to have contributed to the extent of St. Elizabeth's flood in 1421.

He retained his influence at court under William II, Empress Margaret, and William III. In politics, he supported the maintenance of alliances with Edward III of England and John III of Brabant as a counterweight to French pressure on Hainaut. He was active in the negotiations that led to the confederation of Holland and Hainaut with the duchy of Brabant and the county of Flanders, proclaimed at Vilvoorde in 1340. His lands in both Holland and Hainaut bordered on Brabant, and he had considerable properties and commercial interests within the duchy, giving him good personal reasons to avoid conflict. The alliances he had worked to bring about began to fall apart around 1350, when there was also civil war in Holland.

Duvenvoorde spent his final years in Brabant, where he expended large sums on charitable and pious works, such as convents, churches and hospitals. A chapel that he built in Brussels as part of his city palace is now incorporated into the structure of the Royal Library of Belgium. He died at his estate in Boutersem, near Mechelen, on 12 August 1353, and was buried in the church of the Poor Clares convent he had founded in Brussels. With no legitimate children of his own, most of his possessions passed to his nephew, John II, Lord of Polanen, and so, through Johanna van Polanen, to the House of Nassau.
