= William I of Bavaria =

Duke of Bavaria from 1347 to 1388

William I
- Duke of Bavaria
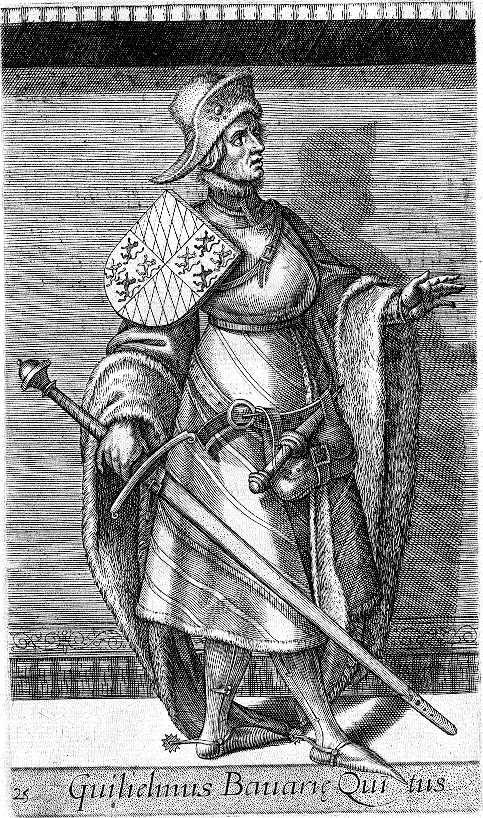
- Portrait by Willem Thibaut
- Born: 12 May 1330; Frankfurt, Holy Roman Empire
- Died: 15 April 1389 (aged 58); Le Quesnoy
- Spouse: Maud, Countess of Leicester
- House: Wittelsbach
- Father: Louis IV, Holy Roman Emperor
- Mother: Margaret II, Countess of Hainaut

William I, Duke of Bavaria-Straubing (Frankfurt am Main, 12 May 1330 – 15 April 1389, Le Quesnoy), was the second son of Emperor Louis IV and Margaret II of Hainaut. He was also known as William V, Count of Holland, as William III, Count of Hainaut and as William IV Count of Zeeland.

== Biography ==
In 1345 William's father was conferring Hainaut, Holland, Zeeland and Friesland upon his wife Margaret, and shortly later also upon their son William. After his father's death in 1347, William ruled Bavaria, Holland and Hainaut together with his five brothers until 1349. With the first division of the Wittelsbach possessions in 1349 he received Hainaut, Holland and Lower Bavaria together with his brothers Stephen II and Albert I. After the next division of Bavaria in 1353, he ruled together with his younger brother Albert I in Bavaria-Straubing, Holland and Hainaut.

William had engaged in a long struggle with his mother Margaret, obtaining Holland and Zeeland from her in 1354, and Hainaut on her death in 1356.

In 1350, the nobles of Holland asked Margaret to return to Holland again. She then battled for the power in Holland and Hainaut for some years with her son William who refused to pay her alimony. The Cod league was formed on 23 May 1350 by a number of supporters of William. On 5 September the same year, the Hook league was formed. Soon afterwards, these factions clashed, and a civil war began.

Edward III of England, Margaret's brother-in-law through her sister Philippa of Hainault, came to her aid. In May 1351 William lost the naval Battle of Veere. A few weeks later, the Hooks and their English allies were defeated by William and the Cods in the Battle of Zwartewaal, which ruined Margaret's cause. Edward III shortly afterwards changed sides, and the empress saw herself compelled (1354) to come to an understanding with her son, he being recognized as count of Holland and Zeeland, she of Hainaut. Margaret died two years later, leaving William in possession of the entire Holland-Hainaut inheritance (July 1356). William was married to Matilda ("Maud" in the English style) of Lancaster, sister to Blanche of Lancaster.

In 1357, on returning from a trip to England, William began to show signs of insanity, going so far as to attack and kill one of his knights (Gerard van Wateringe) for no apparent reason, before he could be restrained. His brother Albert assumed the regency in Holland and Hainaut in 1358. William, initially held in The Hague, was then confined to Castle Le Quesnoy for the remainder of his life. There were unfounded rumors that his insanity was caused by a poisoning attempt while in England.

Duke William of Bavaria, Count For Hainault, Holland and Zeeland. He was, truly, young and tall, strong and swarthy and agile, more fleet and dexterous than any man in his land, and he had married the daughter of the worthy and valiant Duke of Lancaster; but he was curiously distant and inscrutable: he wouldn't welcome or acknowledge people in the manner of a great prince, and took no pleasure in the company of ladies or damsels, at feasts or otherwise; nor did he have any close confidants (except just one, called master Thierry); and you could never be quite sure whether you were in favor with him or not. And in the end, not long after he'd arranged the peace between the Count of Flanders and the Duke of Brabant, he lost his wits entirely, and most of the time he had to be bound hand and foot. From that point on, the two lands of Hainault and Holland were governed by the lady his wife, and subsequently, since she never had a child by him, by his younger brother Duke Albert.

— Jean le Bel, The True Chronicles of Jean Le Bel, p. 107

== Family and children ==
Coats of arms of the Counts of Hainaut and Holland of Wittelsbach family

He married Matilda of Lancaster, daughter of Henry of Grosmont, 1st Duke of Lancaster and Isabel de Beaumont in London in 1352. They had only one daughter Alice, who died in 1356.

Also, he had illegitimate children:

1. Wilhelm, married 1398 Lisbeth Hughe.
2. Elisabeth, married Brustijn van Herwijnen, lord of Stavenisse.

He was succeeded by his brother Albert in 1389.

== See also ==
- Counts of Hainaut family tree

William I of Bavaria House of Wittelsbach Born: 1330 Died: 1389
Regnal titles
Preceded by Louis IV	Duke of Bavaria; 1347–1349 with Louis V, Stephen II, Louis VI, Albert I, Otto V	Partitioned
New title	Duke of Lower Bavaria; 1349–1353 with Stephen II and Albert I	Partitioned
New title	Duke of Bavaria-Straubing; 1353–1388 with Albert I	Succeeded by Albert I
Preceded by Margaret II	Count of Holland and Zeeland; 1354–1388	Succeeded by Albert I
Preceded by Margaret II	Count of Hainaut; 1356–1388	Succeeded by Albert I
