= The 'Laakmolen' near The Hague =

1882 painting by Vincent van Gogh

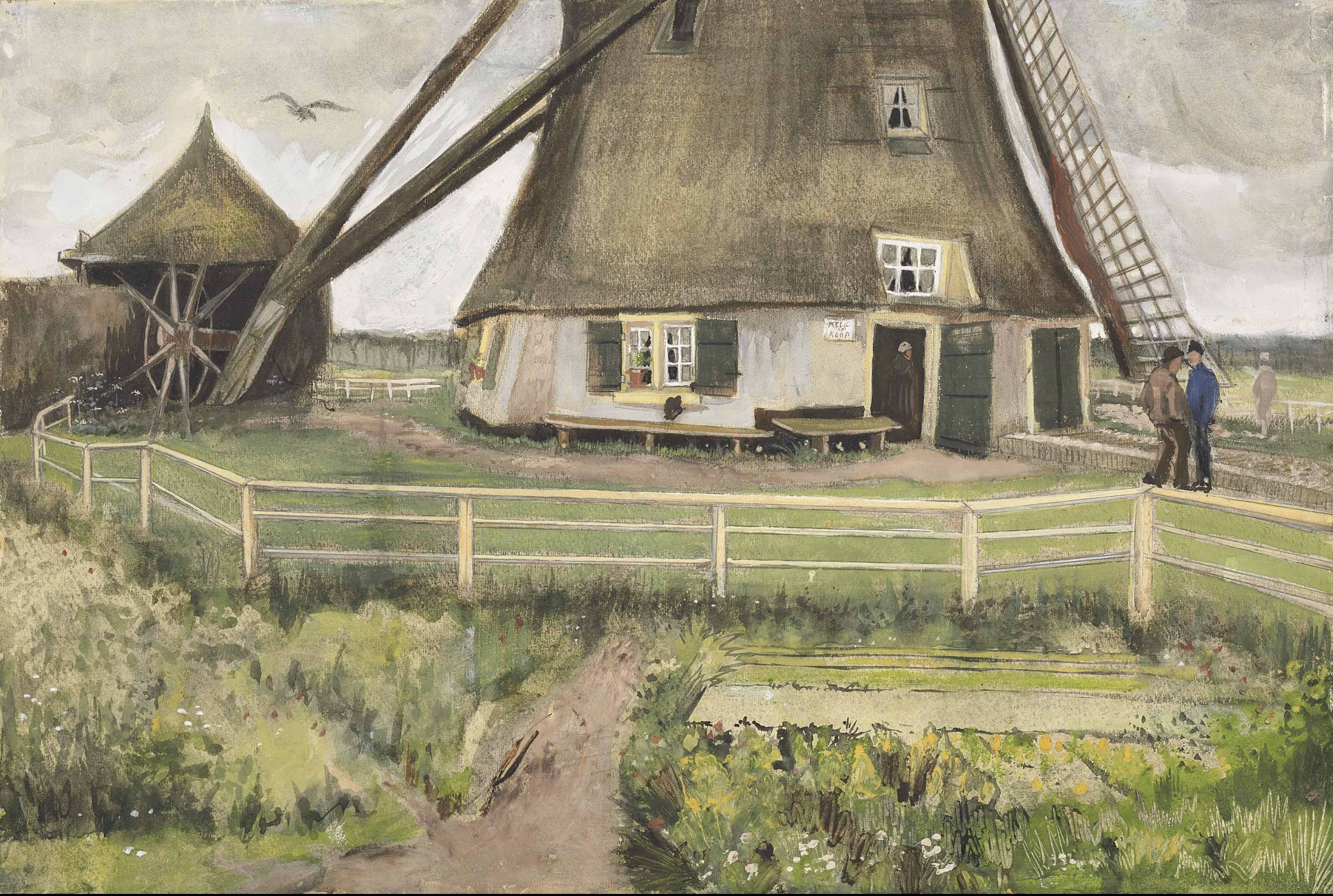
- Artist: Vincent van Gogh
- Year: 1882
- Catalogue: F884/JH59
- Medium: watercolor and pen on paper mounted on board
- Dimensions: 37.7 cm × 56 cm (14.8 in × 22 in)
- Location: 52°04′04″N 4°19′57″E

The 'Laakmolen' near the Hague is a watercolor by Vincent van Gogh that he made in the summer of 1882. Formerly it was thought to have dated from his Etten period 1881. Following identification of the mill, historians now place it the year following.

== Description ==
Both Hulsker and De La Faille place the work as done at Etten around October 1881. Hulsker notes that the work is not mentioned anywhere and is difficult to place. Christie's, following Martha Op de Coul, date the watercolor as done later in summer 1882 after van Gogh had moved to The Hague. The mill is identified as the Laakmolen (52°4′4.16″N 4°19′56.98″E), a well known mill on the way to Rijswijk, at that time a village near The Hague.

The location is of considerable interest because in the summer of 1872 (i.e. some ten years earlier), Vincent's brother Theo had come to visit Vincent at The Hague and together they had walked to a mill at Rijswijk (presumed to be the Laakmolen, one of just two at Rijswijk) where they drank milk together. It seems this walk held special emotional significance for Vincent, as he later referred to it several times in his letters to Theo. Biographers have suggested that at this time they made a pact together to pursue a career in art.

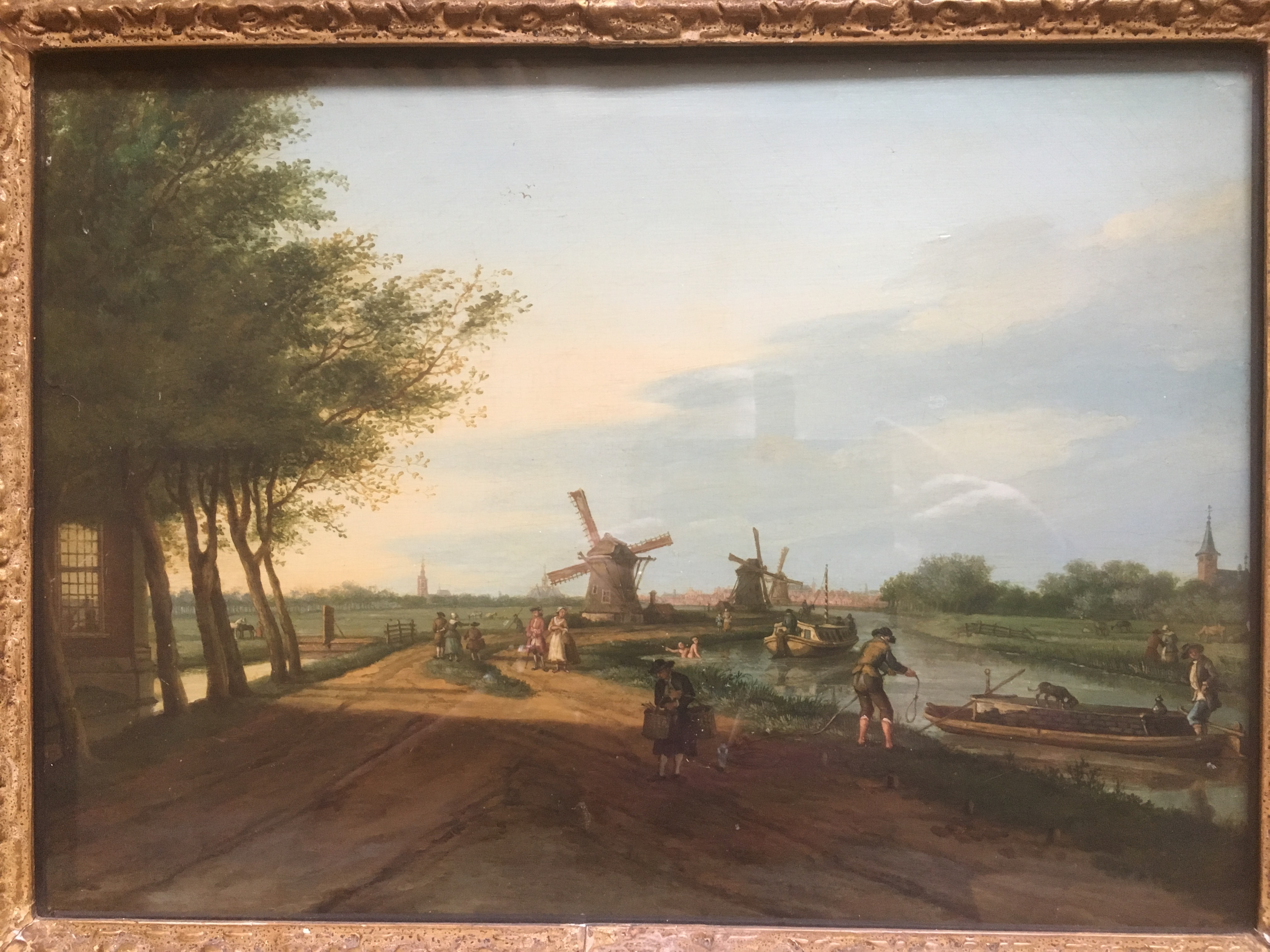
The Laakmolen (middle windmill)

The watercolor sold for £2,322,500 at Christies, London, on 23 June 2015.

An earlier painting which shows the Laakmolen in a view of The Hague from Rijswijk by Paulus Constantijn La Fargue circa 1765–1770. On the left is the theekoeppel where afternoon tea was taken. On the right shows the roof and tower of Binckhorst Castle. The tow path is the Cromvlietkade. In the distance prominent buildings of the Hague can be identified.

== See also ==
- List of works by Vincent van Gogh

== References and sources ==
Sources

- Op de Coul, Martha. De Laakmolen in Den Haag door Vincent van Gogh, Oud Holland - Quarterly for Dutch Art History, Volume 104, Issue 3, pages 336 – 340, 1990, DOI: 10.1163/187501790X00183
- J.B. de la Faille, The Works of Vincent van Gogh: His Paintings and Drawings, Amsterdam, 1970, no. F 844, pp. 317 & 644 (illustrated; titled 'The Windmill' and dated 'August 1881')
- J. Hulsker, The New Complete Van Gogh: Paintings, Drawings, Sketches, Amsterdam, 1996, no. 59, p. 24
- Naifeh, Steven and Smith, Gregory White. Van Gogh: the Life, New York: Random House, 2011, p. 76. ISBN 978-0-375-50748-9
