= Siege of Zierikzee (1351) =

Long siege of Geertruidenberg Castle

- Part of the Hook and Cod wars
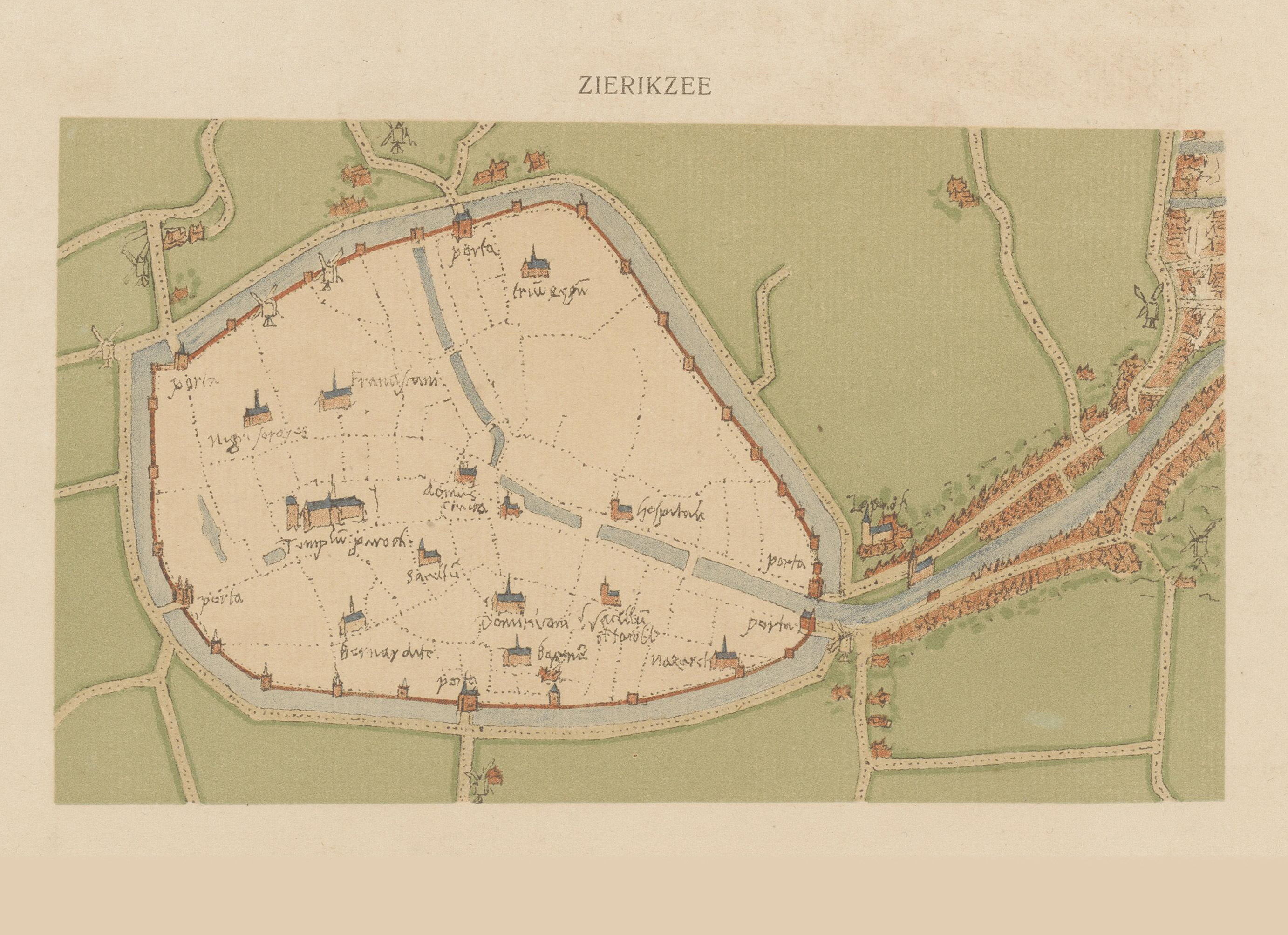
- Zierikzee in 1560
| Date | 17 August – 2 October 1351 |
| Location | Zierikzee, County of Zeeland, the Netherlands) 51.650536°N 3.919199°E |
| Result | Cod victory |

Commanders and leaders
- Willem IV
- Zierikzee, the Netherlands

The siege of Zierikzee (1351) took place during the first of the Hook and Cod wars.

== Prelude ==
=== The city of Zierikzee ===
In the Middle Ages Zierikzee was a town of substantial importance. At the time, the Eastern Scheldt was the main branch of the Scheldt., which made Zierikzee a relevant seaport. The Western Scheldt, was at that time too shallow to allow sea-going ships to reach Antwerp.

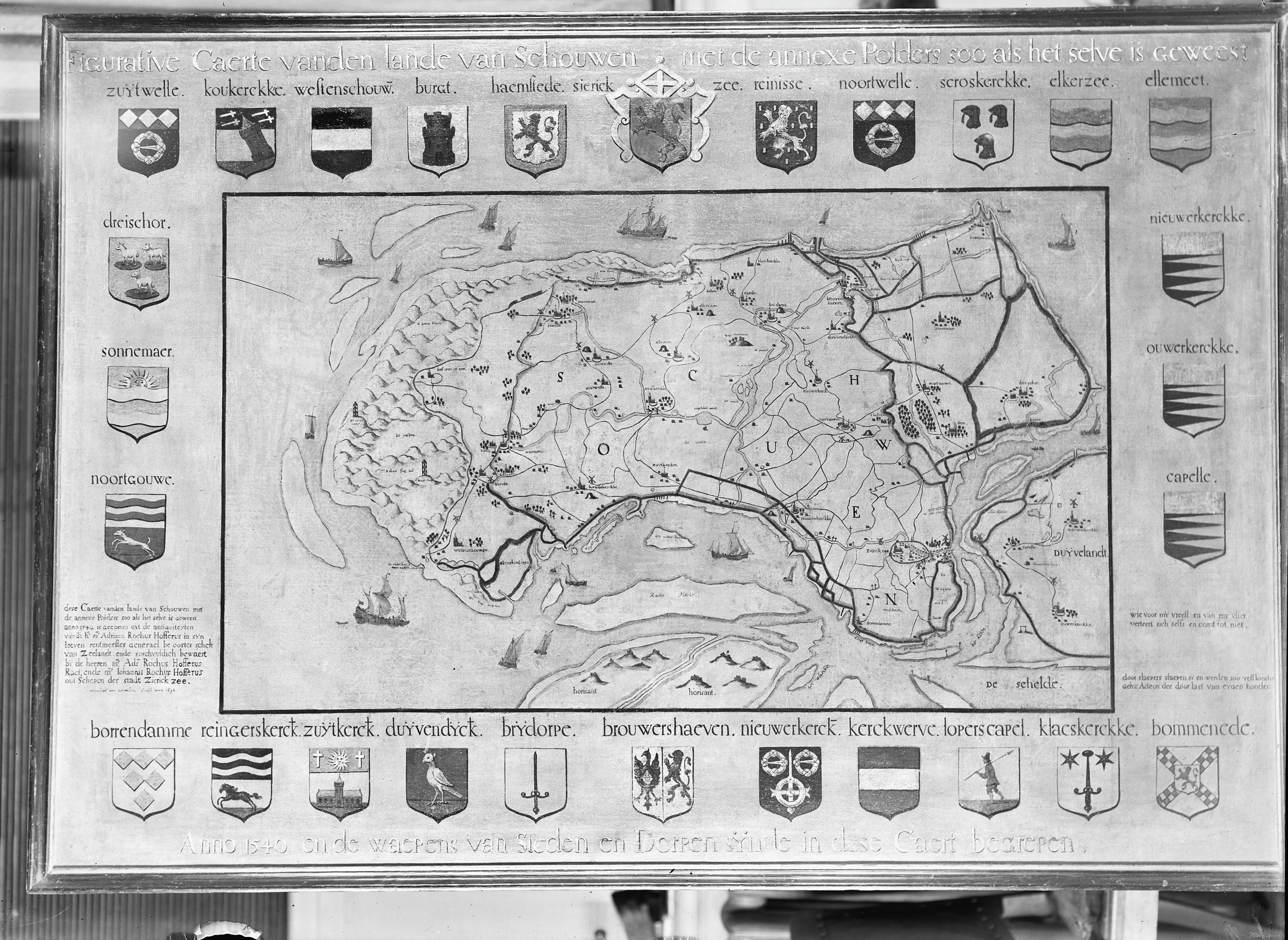
Old map of separate Schouwen and Duiveland

In the early the Middle Ages, the islands of Schouwen, Duiveland, Dreischor, and Bommenede, which now form Schouwen-Duiveland were still separate. Schouwen and Dreischor were joined in 1374. Schouwen and Duiveland were joined in 1610. Bommenede was flooded repeatedly and was temporarily abandoned in 1684. The Gouwe, which divided Schouwen from Duiveland, was a wide, but shallow estuary. Together with the Bernisse separating Voorne from Putten, the Gouwe formed an (inland) shipping route between Holland and Vlaanderen, which provided Zierikzee with access to inland shipping, next to sea transport.

In the first decade of the 14th century, hostilities between the count of Flanders and the count of Holland around ownership of the islands of Zeeland started. This led to a number of attacks on Zierikzee. In 1303, the city withstood a Flemish siege that ended in an armistice. Hostilities recommenced in March 1304. The Flemish inflicted a defeat on a naval fleet raised by Holland, and laid siege to Zierikzee when en route to a land based invasion of Holland. After this invasion had failed, the Flemish started a third siege of Zierikzee. This ended with the naval Battle of Zierikzee on 10–11 August 1304. in which the Flemish fleet was largely destroyed and all claims of Flanders to Zeeland effectively ended, and Zierikzee came firmly under the control of the count of Holland.

Zierikzee city flourished in the fourteenth century which lead to the construction of the still existent city gates Noordhavenpoort and Nobelpoort.

=== Zierikzee in the early years of the Hook and Cod wars ===
In 1345 Count William IV of Holland died childless. He was succeeded by his older sister Margaret of Hainaut. Margaret made her son William her lieutenant in Holland and Zeeland. However, with the lack of children of William II the succession of power turned out to be problematic. During this turbid period slumbering tensions between conservative nobility and the cities whose independent power had been growing erupted. The Zeeland nobility was openly trying to settle its score with the cities and Zierikzee was in almost open rebellion. On 31 August 1346 Margaret forbid subjects to communicate with Zierikzee and she openly called its citizens her enemies.

By 1347, Zierikzee appeared to have made peace with the conservative noble fraction named the Hooks. The city is recorded to have paid 2,400 gold Écu to Margaret in that year. The shift to support the Hook fraction was triggered by the local lord of Moermond Castle supporting Hook supporters in an internal strive in Zierikzee. The opposing Cod fraction had by 1949 supported Margaret's son William to replace his mother as count of Holland and Zealand, triggering the Hook and Cod wars that erupted in 1350. Zierikzee had chosen the Hook side.

== Events leading up to the siege ==
=== Zierikzee as a Hook headquarters ===
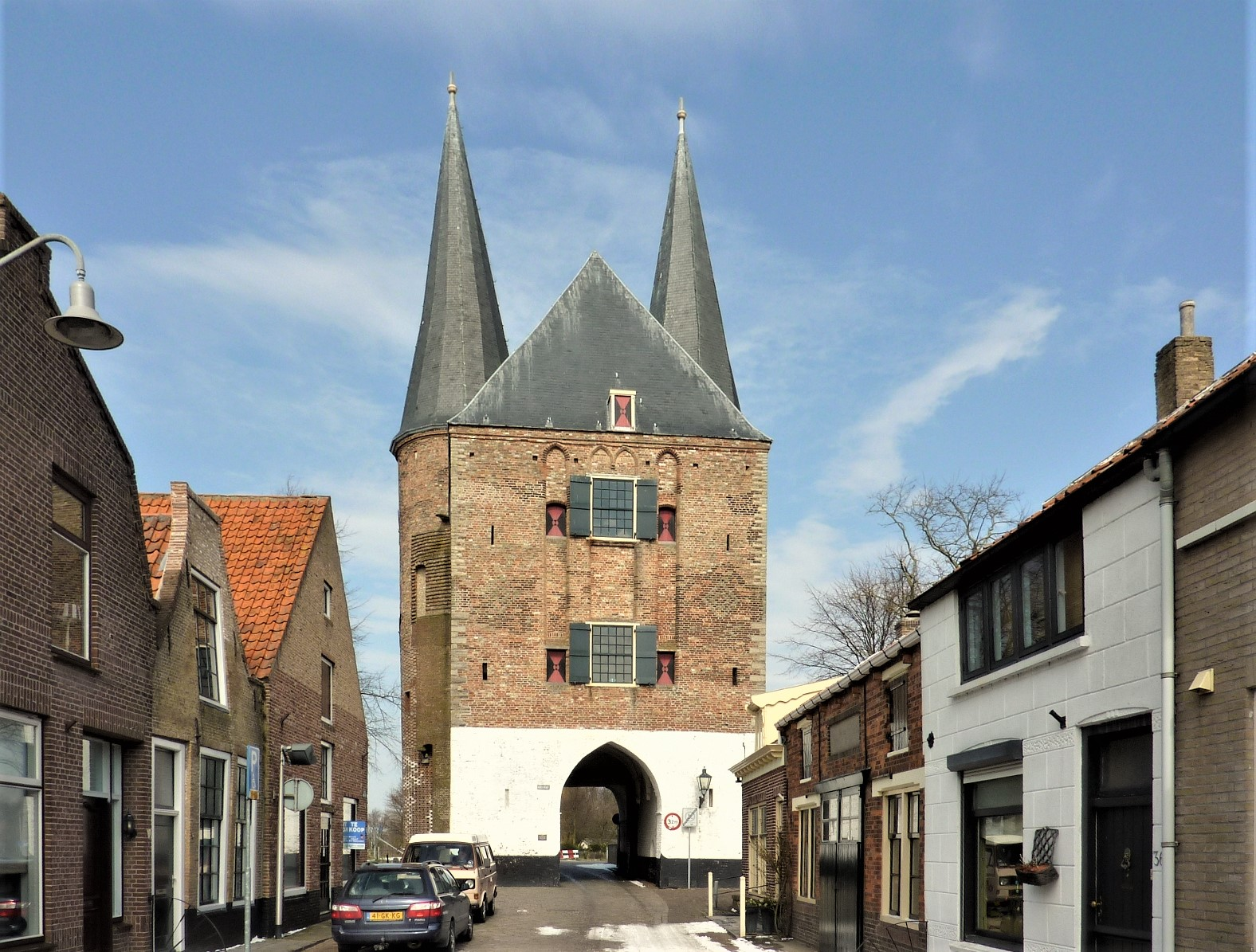
Nobelpoort

The first Hook and Cod war started in earnest when Delft and other Holland cities rebelled in August 1350. They claimed that Margaret's son William V was their lawful sovereign. While almost all Holland cities joined the rebellion, the important cities of Dordrecht and Geertruidenberg initially remained loyal to Margaret. The County of Zeeland did not join the rebellion, i.e. both Zierikzee and Middelburg kept the Hook side. Therefore, Margaret went to Zierikzee to get acclaimed as countess of Zeeland.

From Zierikzee Margaret went to Middelburg to assure herself of the loyalty of the southern part of Zeeland. In January 1351 she got open letters of leading noblemen that confirmed their loyalty. In Februari 1351, letters arrived in Zierikzee stating that Gerard van Herlaer had freed her son from his Hainaut captivity, and that he had placed himself at the head of the Cod party.

Margaret now went north to safe her interests. In March 1351 she was in Dordrecht, where many others pledged their loyalty. Margaret then went to Calais to enlist the help of England, taking the city councils of Dordrecht, Middelburg and Zierikzee with her.

The move to Calais made that Margaret's position collapsed. On 16 April Dordrecht switched to William's side. Wolfert III van Borselen also joined him, causing Middelburg to join William's side.

Zierikzee, where Margaret's son Louis was, remained loyal. On 28 April 1351 Louis urgently appealed for help from the County of Hainaut. Margaret and Louis then met at Reimerswaal. They intended to fight Wolfert's Cod army, but this mostly deserted when it learned that Margaret had arrived. Wolfert then met Count William and both went to Middelburg, where Wolfert died from illness. William then went to Holland, and Margaret and Louis to Zierikzee.

=== The Battle of Veere ===
Margaret and her son where in Zierikzee when an English fleet under admiral Manny arrived. Margaret now sent De Manny to Middelburg, but he did not succeed in subdueing the city. The c. 28 May 1351 Hook victory in the Battle of Veere is probably connected to De Manny's expedition. The capture of the small town of Domburg seems to have been the only result.

=== The Battle of Zwartewaal ===
After their victory in the Battle of Veere, the Hook party probably attempted to first regain control of the whole of Zeeland. This is what De Manny's trip to Middelburg implies. The story of how the angry citizens of Middelburg chased him away, implies that this attempt failed. Meanwhile, the town of Geertruidenberg joined William's side on 15 June. Margaret and her army then sailed north, but were severely defeated in the 3–5 July 1351 naval Battle of Zwartewaal. Margaret first returned to Zierikzee to settle her affairs there, and then continued to Hainaut. Others say that Margaret 'fled' to Zierikzee.

== Siege ==
=== William's counter offensive ===
Count William now obviously started a counter-offensive in Zeeland. On 5 August 1351 ('Thursday after St. Peter ad Vincula), William was in Reimerswaal. Here William issued a safe conduct for up to 60 citizens of Zierikzee to come visit him in Reimerswaal before Sunday next. He would then explain why he was their rightful lord. That is, he asked Zierikzee to submit to his authority.

On 17 August 1351 William was 'in his tent' in the since disappeared village of Borrendamme. This was just south of Zierikzee, see the old map of separate Schouwen and Duiveland. On 21 August 1351, William was still in his tent at Borrendamme. The mention that William was 'in his tent' implies that he was there with his army. The contemporary Antwerp secretary Jan van Boendale confirmed this by noting that William "chased his mother from Zierikzee with his army".

=== Ended by treaty ===
On 21 August 1351, William made a treaty with the council of Zierikzee. The treaty was a cease-fire between the parties which would last up till and including 1 October (Saint Bavo day). If Margaret and her army would enter Zeeland before 2 October and require Zierikzee to help her, the city would give William 8 days' notice before commencing hostilities. If Margaret did not relief (niet en ontzette) the city before 2 October, the city would allow William to enter, and acclaim him as their just lord.

The treaty included all people from Zierikzee and all people from both parts of Zeeland that were in the city. As long as the cease-fire was in force the citizens could freely use their possessions on the island. However, the people from south of the Scheldt which were in Zierikzee were banned from going to Walcheren during the cease-fire. Jan van der Maelstede was mentioned separately as included in the treaty. The treaty also contained a lot of stipulations for the time after William would enter the city. These related primarily to debts that Margaret had contracted.

It is not known whether William's army stayed at Borrendamme after the conclusion of the treaty. On 1 September, William was in Middelburg. On 3 September he was in Bergen op Zoom. On 5 September he was back in Middelburg. On 8 October 1351, William was indeed master of Zierikzee. Therefore, one can conclude that the armistice ended with Zierikzee acclaiming William V shortly after 1 October.

=== Nature of the siege ===
One can wonder about the nature of the 1351 siege of Zierikzee. The combination of the 5 August letter from Reimerswaal and William's presence at Borrendamme on 17 August, indicates that William had to show up with his army before Zierikzee was prepared to submit to him. The 21 August treaty was a typical way for a siege to end. The stipulation about Margaret not relieving the city before 1 October implies that some kind of blockading force was left before the city. On the other hand, the stipulation that the citizens could freely use their possessions 'everywhere', implies that William's army had not completely surrounded the city.

== The 1351 siege in Dutch Historiography ==
In Dutch historiography, the 1351 siege of Zierikzee remained unknown for a very long time. Jan van Boendale's statement that William chased his mother from Zierikzee with his army remained unnoticed. Marcus Zuerius van Boxhorn noted the above safe conduct letter in the municipal archives of Zierikzee. He did not note the somewhat later treaty. Jan Wagenaar (1709–1773) also did not know about the 1351 siege of Zierikzee. He simply assumed that Margaret went straight to England after the Battle of Zwartewaal.

In the 1770s Marinus Jan de Jonge found the 21 August 1351 treaty by which Zierikzee changed sides in the municipal archives of Zierikzee. He made it one of the subjects of his thesis. In 1790 Hendrik van Wijn picked up De Jonge's find, and mentioned an August 1351 siege of Zierikzee, ending in a truce and the city submitting to William at the start of October. Johan de Kanter, published his Chronyk van Zierikzee in 1794. He missed the 1351 siege.

Rijksarchivaris (Chief Archivist of the Dutch National Archives) Johannes Cornelis de Jonge (1793–1853), was a nephew of Marinus Jan, and a native of Zierikzee. In his 'Verhandeling over den oorsprong der Hoeksche en Kabeljaauwsche twisten' he of course mentioned the siege, and the publication of the two charters by his uncle in 1778.
