= Binckhorst Castle =

- Kasteel de Binckhorst
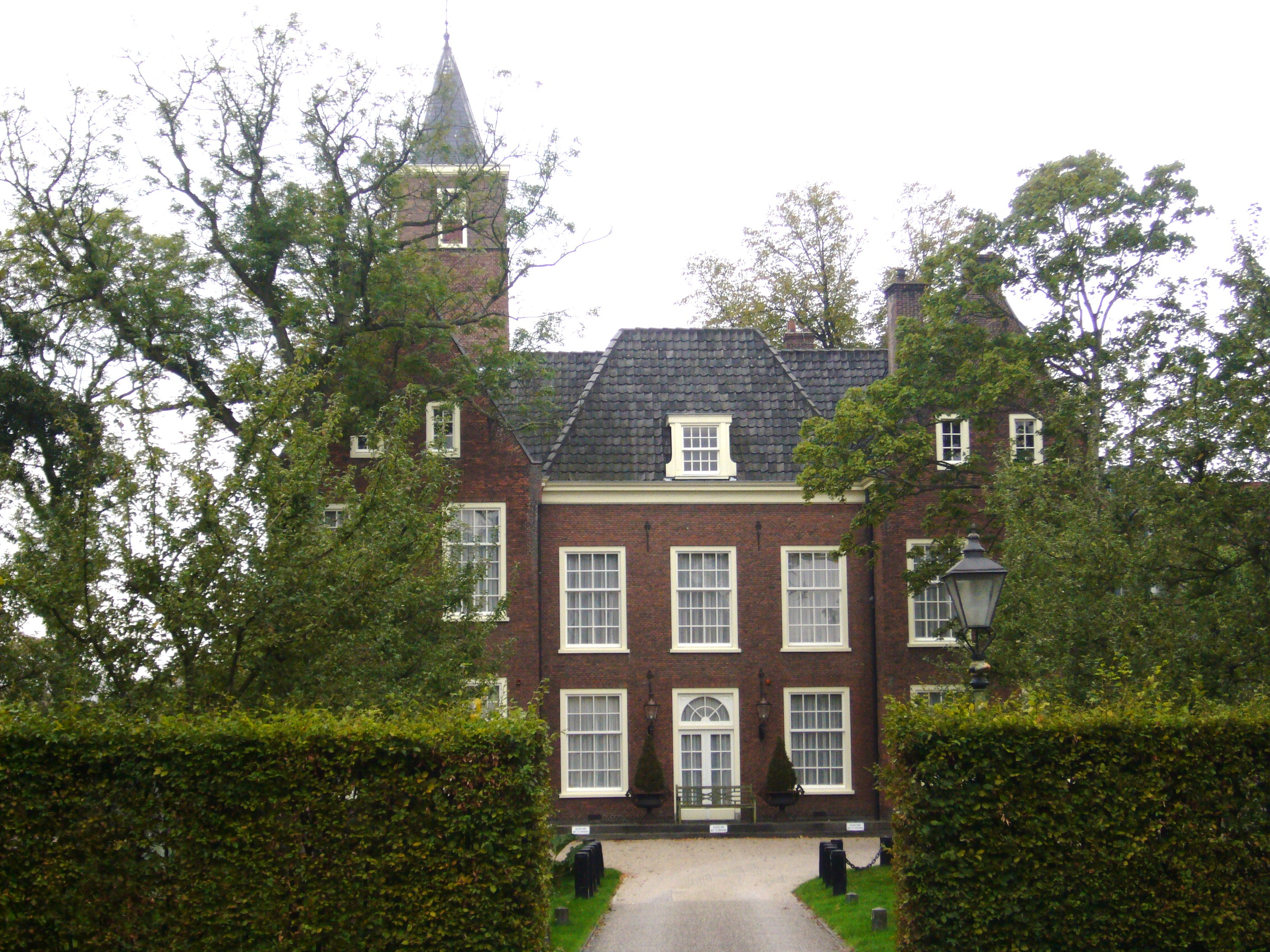
- Binckhorst Castle in 2009

- Location within South Holland

General information
- Architectural style: Dutch Baroque architecture
- Location: The Hague, Netherlands
- Coordinates: 52.067014°N 4.336876°E

Binckhorst Castle is a 16th and 17th century manor built on top of a demolished medieval castle.

== Location ==
Binckhorst Castle is located in The Hague city quarter of the same name. It used to be part of the now former Voorburg municipality till 1907. The road called Binckhorstlaan might be the successor of a Roman road connected to Forum Hadriani.

In 1344 the canal 'Haagse Trekvliet' was dug from The Hague city moats to the Vliet, which runs between Leiden and Delft. The castle thus became very important for the economy of The Hague, because it could stop traffic on the canal.

== Castle characteristics ==
=== The current castle ===
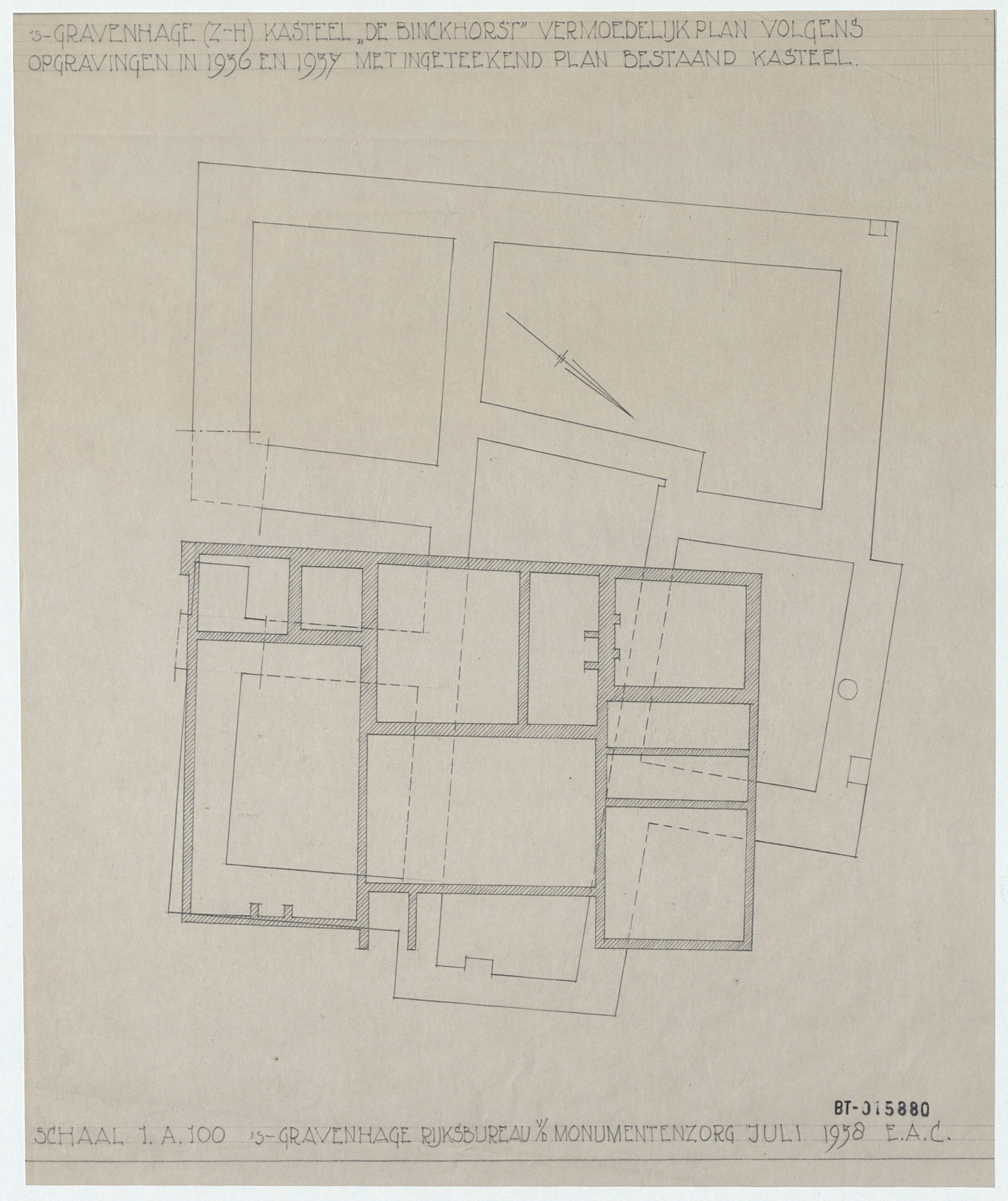
Binckhorst Castle combined floor plan from 1936 and from excavations

The current castle was built on top of a medieval castle. It is actually a manor which was restored in the 1930s. This restoration was necessary because of problems with the foundation. It involved the creation of a new foundation, and rebuilding most of the walls. It makes that most of the current Binckhorst Castle is a reconstruction.

=== The medieval castle ===
In 1936 and 1937 archaeological excavations took place at the site, probably in relation to making new foundations for the castle. It revealed a medieval floor plan that was somewhat over twice the size of the current castle. Its size, defensive capability, and irregular square form suggest a castle that had organically grown before square castles with protruding towers, like Muiden Castle became the norm in about 1285.

The current manor still stands on a low hill surrounded by a moat. The round form seems typical for older castles. In a 1619 overview of Jacob II's accounts there is a reference to paying a mason for repairing the hill on which the house stood.

=== The manor ===
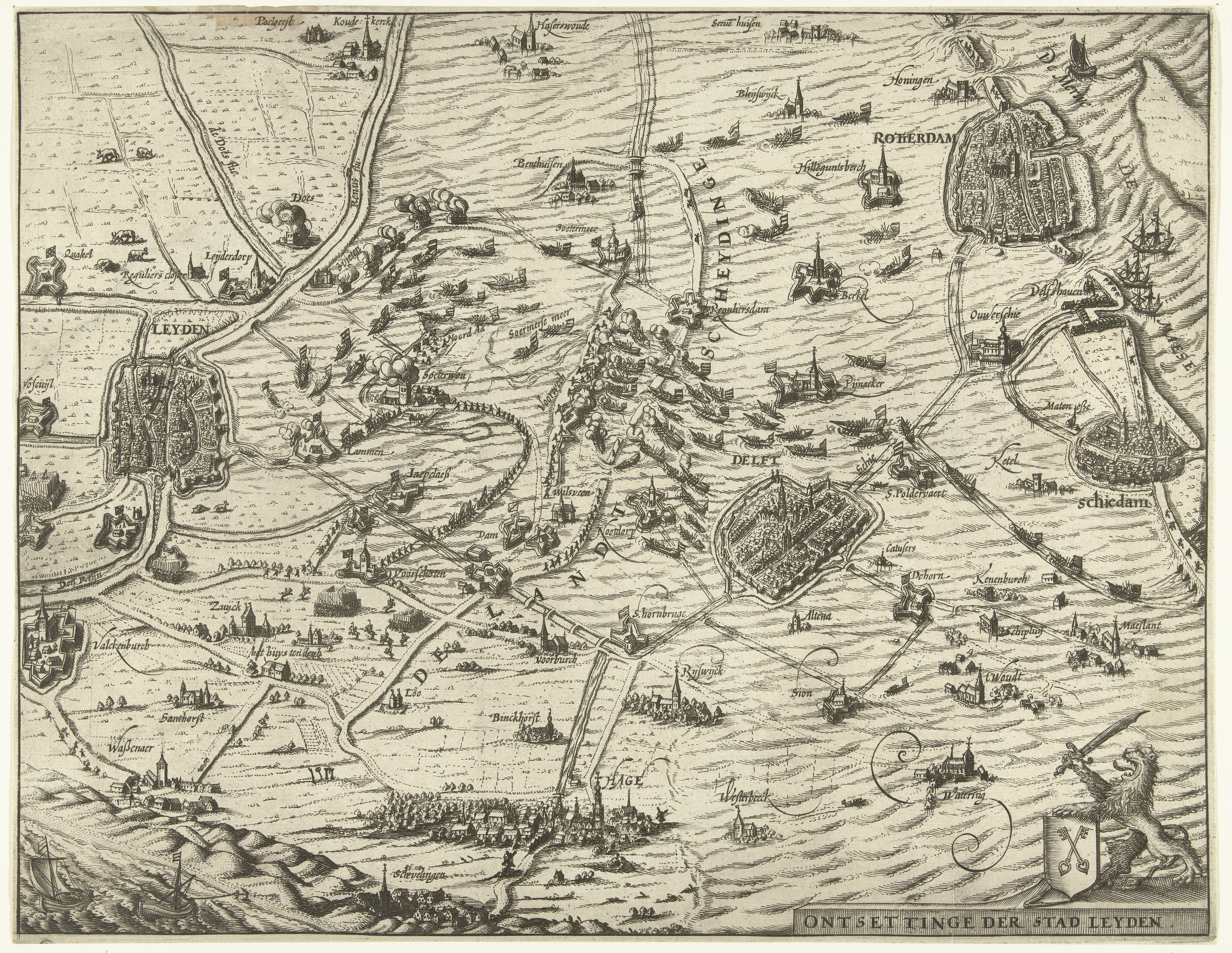
On a map from about 1624

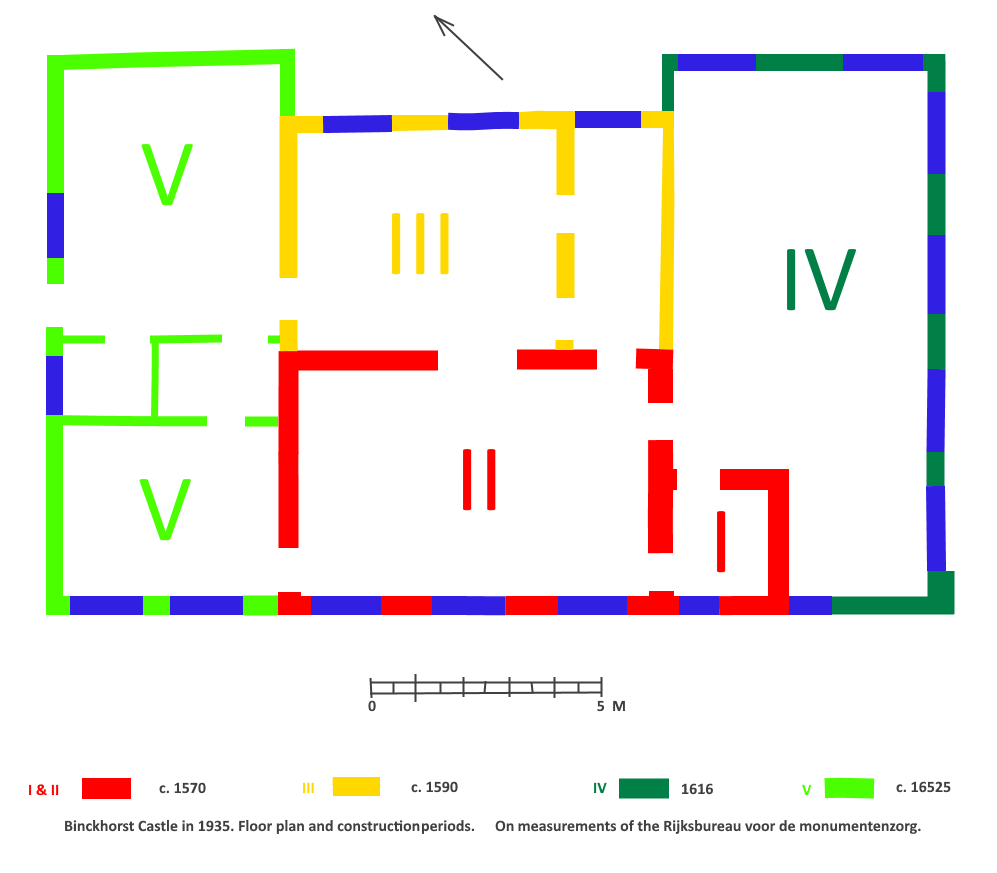
Binckhorst Castle 1935 - 1936 floor plan showing constructiong phases.

Current knowledge about Binckhorst Castle still heavily relies on the work that Jaap Renaud did in the 1930s. When he investigated the building at that time, his first conclusion was that there was nothing medieval about the building as it stood. For Binckhorst to be a medieval building, the format of its bricks was too small, and the walls were too thin.

Renaud investigated a map of the end of the Siege of Leiden. It depicts Binckhorst Castle as a simple construction consisting of a small house and a stair tower. He concluded this was not a depiction of the medieval situation, which would be proven correct in subsequent excavations, but the predecessor of the core of the current building. He also consulted a 1611 map by Floris Balthasar. This depicted the long façade of the house, and the stair tower both facing the Trekvliet as they do today.

The core of the 1930s building consists of a stair tower (I) and a small house (II). The tower could only be accessed from inside the house. The house had a vaulted basement which reached to about 90 cm above the current ground level. It could be accessed by a stair from the outside, found by the 1930s investigation.

Renaud found that the outside of building I and II facing building III had been carefully finished, as is proper for an outside wall. The same applied to the wall between II and V. The same was noticed on a part of the wall between II and IV. In short, both pictures which Renaud qualified as different buildings, were inline with the 1930s investigation.

It was found that the core of the building as it stood in the 1930s had been constructed without proper means. Neither the core building nor the connected tower had proper foundations. The simple foundations consisted of some rows of re-used kloostermoppen (medieval brick), upon which the new two-stone thick walls were erected. As a consequence, the tower was off 60 cm by the 1930s. The red brick used in this construction measured 19-20 * 9-9.5 * 4.5 cm.

On the front side (with the tower), the foundations of the most southern point are profound, but about 1 m from there, the foundation suddenly ended, and the walls were built almost on ground level. Here the ground contains very much debris. Obviously this ground was deemed solid enough to build without foundations.

In other places the foundations were found to be 90 cm deep, sometimes even deeper. The foundations of the north corner of part III were remarkable. On superficial inspection, these seemed to consist of a shallow layer of reused kloostermoppen (medieval brick). Excavation then revealed a piece of masonry consisting of all kinds of pieces and chunks. Beneath it were four layers of big yellow kloostermoppen. This seemed a part of the medieval castle, but in turn these layers were on top of 9 layers of the red brick of the 16th century wall. Beneath this was medieval masonry. In total this foundation was two meters deep.

In the back of room V, the wall between III and V at the north corner of III had a vertical seam that reached till the foundations. In this corner of III these were again found to consist of a row of medieval kloostermoppen. The wall between III and IV had the same foundation, and was also made of red brick, this time of 19-20 * 9-10 * 4.5 cm. It did not form part of the wall of II, and the oldest part reached only till about 1.60 m above the floor.

The 1614 picture by J. Londerseel is a bit off, but depicts the situation that part V has not yet been built, and that II and III had separate roofs A sundial probably dated to 1616, and some archives allowed to date the construction of part IV to that year. This is inline with the type of windows in the southeastern wing. The brick in part IV was red with yellow veins, or sometimes vice versa., size 18 * 9 * 4 cm. The rear wall of part IV was renovated later, and also showed a small brick of 16 * 7 * 3.5 cm.

Part V was constructed soon after part IV. Its walls consisted of a catalogue of different brick types. The cellar was constructed with the same brick as in IV. Above that, many types were used. Any dating based on the brick was therefore almost impossible with regard to this part of the building. A drawing by Roelant Roghman shows a building with three stepped gables, and part V still being lower.

In 1690 the ownership of Binckhorst changed. The new owner removed the stepped gables and probably brought II and V under one roof. The new situation is depicted on a 1725 drawing. In 1727 Johan Huyman bought the castle. Windows were moved and enlarged, and the front door was placed in a new larger frame together with windows. The windows in V and the tower were still later changes, probably by Marens de Jong in the late 19th century.

== History ==
=== Origins ===
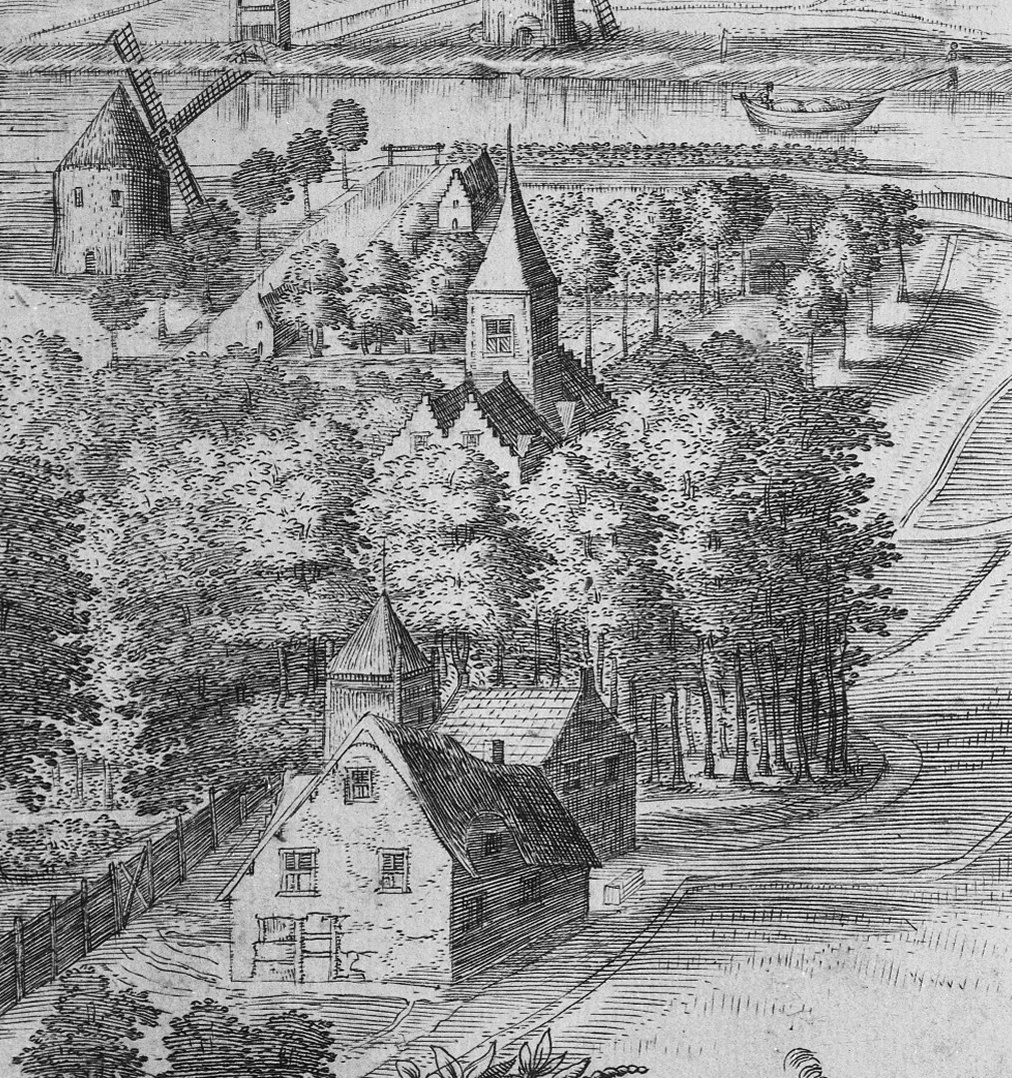
By J. Londerseel in 1614

The name Binckhorst is old. In 1076 an Evert van der Binckhorst is mentioned. The reference might apply to the current castle, but that's not sure at all. The part 'horst' denotes a higher ground with some trees. 'Bink' might also mean stack or height. Near Binckhorst a height was levelled to use the ground to make the surroundings higher. In 1567 Jacob Snouckaert wrote about: ende den lande die ick van den hoochte in den laechte alree heb doen brengen met afkarren ende noch doen sall. (And the ground that I have had brought from the height to the depression, and will bring there.)

=== The Binckhorst family ===
In 1308 the huys Binchorst was transferred to Count William III of Holland by Simon van Benthem. In turn, the count granted it back to him as a fief. The inheritance conditions were very lenient, it could be inherited by relatively distant family members, up to achterzusterkind. In current Dutch an achterneef is a second cousin. So this indicates inheritance by family members with the same great-grandparents. Because of the grant, it was suggested that the brick medieval castle was built shortly before 1308.

Simon van Benthem married Jacoba van Wassenaar. Jacoba brought in Rosenburgh Castle near Voorschoten as her dowry. The couple had three sons:

- Jan van Rozenburg, who obviously settled at Rosenburgh Castle. His daughter Janne would later inherit Binckhorst Castle from Jacob van Rozenburg.
- Jacob van de Binckhorst first joined the clergy, but left it in 1328. Jacob inherited Binckhorst Castle from his father, and then changed his name from Van Rozenburg to Van de Binckhorst. He was bailiff of Rijnland and Woerden and was a member of the count's council.
- Willem van Rozenburg joined the clergy, and died before 1321.

=== The 1351 siege ===
Jacob was a fanatical member of the Hook Alliance. In 1351, at the beginning of the Hook and Cod Wars, Binckhorst Castle was taken after a short siege. At least, that is what 'a few days of battering' implies. For this the small trebuchet which had been used in the lengthy siege of Rosenburg was brought before Binckhorst. While Count William V was besieging the Binckhorst, his chamberlain bought 50 pieces of wooden plates. This resembles the about 50 men strong besieging force that was later at Polanen Castle.

=== The 1359 siege ===
In 1359 troops from the Cod city Delft besieged and took Binckhorst Castle and Polanen Castle. It is claimed that the castle was destroyed afterwards.

=== Other owners ===
In 1389 Jan van Arkel granted Binckhorst to Johan van Lyenburch. Who got it from Jan van Rozenburg's daughter Janne. In 1409 Aart van Leyenburgh sold it to Dierc Ploech, and in 1435 it was sold to Dirc van Swieten. In 1458 Aert van Zwieten became the owner.

=== Pous and Snouckaert ===
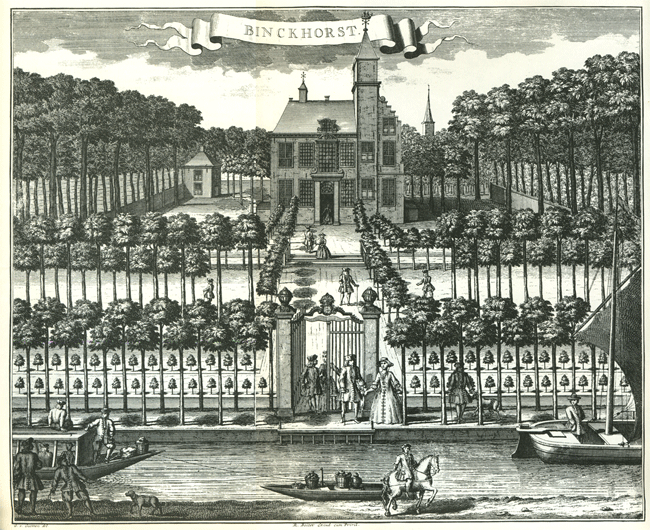
The castle on the Trekvliet, 1735

In 1464 Binckhorst Castle was sold to Dirk Poes Zijbrandszn. The Poes family styled themselves after Binkckhorst. Dirc's son Lodewijk had nine children. He was succeeded by a younger son Dirk, and then by his older son Joost, who was a troublemaker.

Joost Poes' only child Johanna married Knight Willem Snouckaert. He got the fief in 1563. After her death her last will was contested by the Poes family. It saw Lodewijk Pous evicting Snouckaert with 50 armed men and some guns. Willem was succeeded by Martin Snouckaert van Schauburg in 1565. In 1569 he gifted Binckhorst to his brother Jacob Snouckaert. Jacob won the litigation against the Poes family. The Snouckaert's built the manor as it now stands, see above.

After Jacob's death, Binckhorst was inherited by his son Jacob Snouckaert van Binckhorst (1548 - 1617). In 1613 his friend Philibert van Borsselen the first Dutch poem dedicated to the owner of a landed estate. It is called ' Den Binckhorst, ofte Het lof des gelucsalighen ende gherustmoedighen Land-Levens aen Jonck-heer Jacob Snouckaert heere van den Binckhorst'. He was succeeded by two more Jacob's.

=== Van Nobelaer to Sanders ===
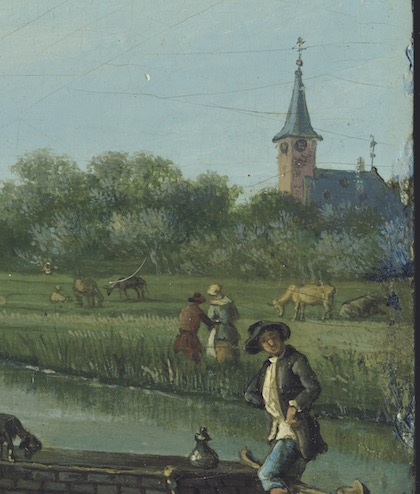
Castle De Binckhorst c.1765

In 1678 Willem van Nobelaer lord of Wissekerke married to Wilhelmina Snouckaert acquired the castle. Next came Henri du Vernet heer de la Vallée. In 1727 Johan Huyman bought the castle and renovated it; see above. During the French period Binckhorst was bought by a Mr. Sanders, a shipping line owner. Another view of Binkhorst can be seen on the right of the painting by PC La Fargue (see section; Examples of his work) titled A view of The Hague from Rijswijk circa 1765.( see zoomed in view from the painting right)

After the Sanders the castle went into decline. In 1923 it was bought by Mr. Volcker, a former sailor who executed some urgent repairs. He then opened a bar in the castle. In 1925 it was sold to H. van Kuik, who wanted to start a pension and teahouse. In 1928 it was acquired by the municipality of The Hague.

=== Restoration ===
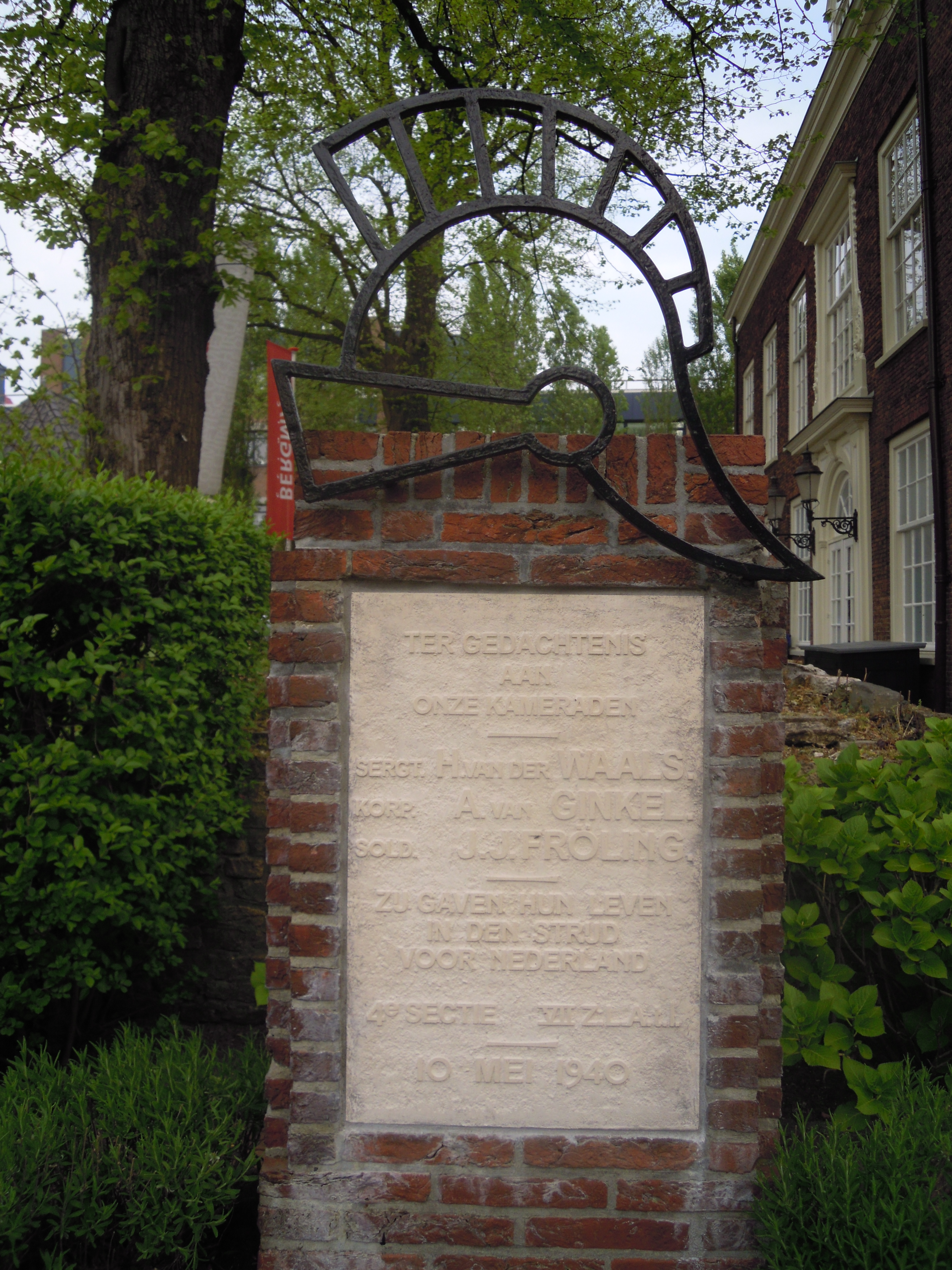
The small World War II memorial at Binckhorst

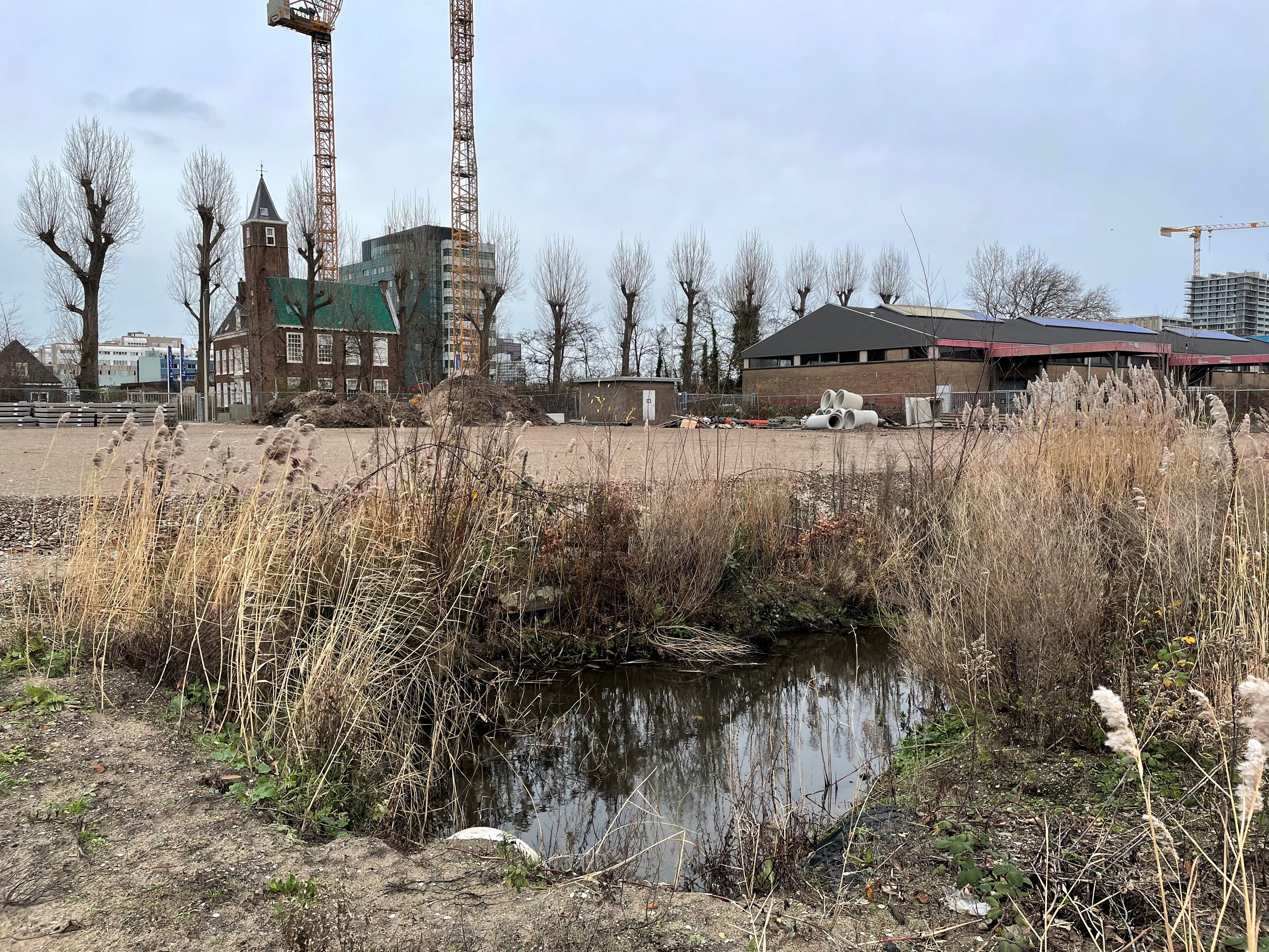
Situation in January 2023

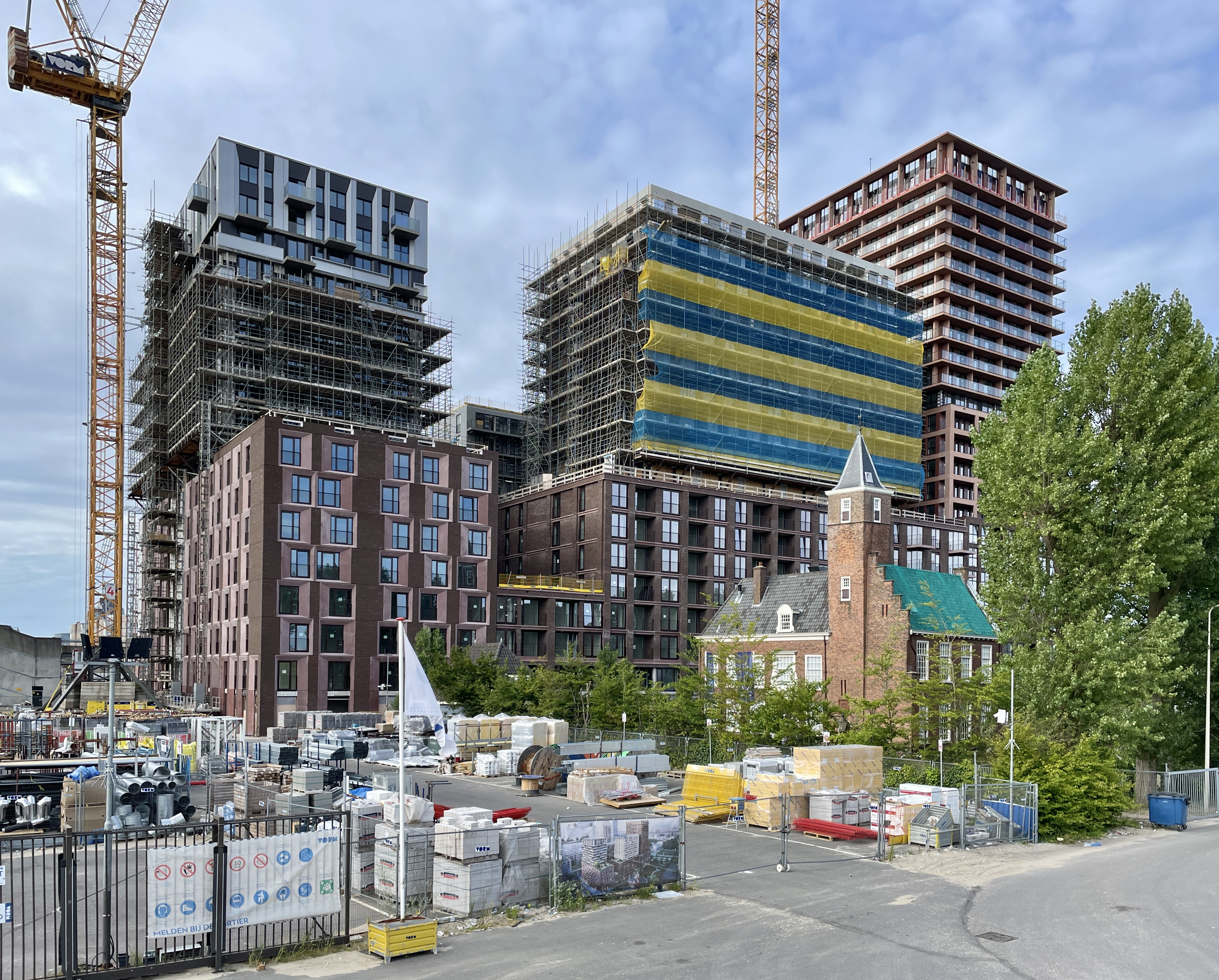
Situation in August 2024

In November 1929 South Holland did not want to subsidize restoration, because the surroundings of the building no longer justified its preservation. In 1932 the very small National Socialist Dutch Workers Party had its headquarters at Binckhorst Castle, but this brought almost no activity. In 1934 the painter Cor Noltee lived at Binckhorst.

In the 1930s it was generally thought that Binckhorst had been a castle with an enceinte and towers in about 1350. By February 1935 it had been agreed to restore the castle as part of a youth employment program. There were two plans. The first plan was to restore it to the condition after the Huyman renovation (above). The second plan was to restore it to the situation before Huyman bought it in 1727. Due to financial constraints the decision was to go for the Huyman situation.

During the renovation it was found that the building lacked proper foundations (above). Much of it was therefore torn down. In March 1936, the part with the stair tower was still standing. By January 1937 the four façades had been rebuilt. Mostly with use of the original material. However, the tower and the 'part build next to it' could not be changed. Therefore, the tower and a small part of the Binckhorst is still original. In early 1938 the renovation was completed.

=== World War II ===
By October 1939 the recently restored castle had been taken into use by the Dutch army. During the May 1940 Battle for The Hague three soldiers volunteered to try to reach the search light near Ypenburg airport from Binckhorst Castle. They were killed, and got a small memorial in the garden of the castle. In April 1942 the castle became an orphanage for boys.

=== Recent history ===
By 1958 the orphanage had left, and the foundation Vakopleiding Bouwbedrijf decided to take up residence in the castle. Then, from the mid-1990s to 2020, the castle housed a private clinic for plastic surgery. Currently (2024) there is a kindergarten in the castle. And as the Binckhorst neighborhood is transformed from an industrial area to a residential one, many office buildings are demolished and replaced by even higher apartment buildings, dwarfing the castle (see pictures).
