= Hook and Cod wars =

140-year period of civil war in medieval Holland

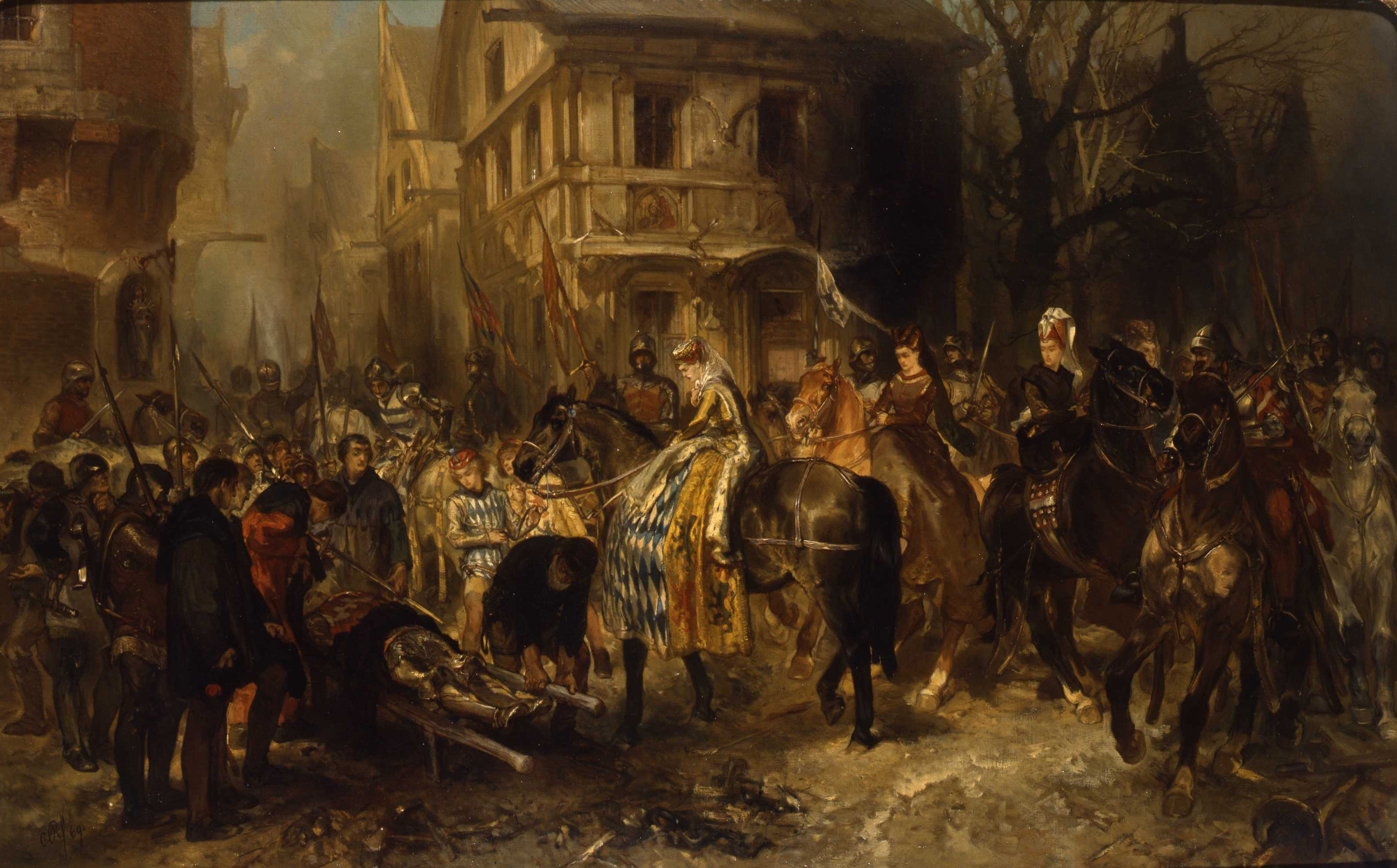
- Jacqueline of Bavaria, entering the conquered Gorkum, faces the corpse of William, Lord of Arkel
Date	1350–1490
Location	Netherlands
Result	Cod league victory

Belligerents
Hook alliance Kingdom of England; Bishopric of Utrecht; Duchy of Cleves	Cod alliance Burgundy

Commanders and leaders
Margaret II	William I

The Hook and Cod wars (Dutch: Hoekse en Kabeljauwse twisten; sometimes semi-anglicised as the wars of the Hoecks and the Cabbeljaws) comprise a series of wars and battles in the County of Holland between 1350 and 1490. Most of these wars were fought over who should hold the title of "Count of Holland". The Cod faction generally consisted of the more progressive cities of Holland. The Hook faction consisted for a large part of the conservative noblemen.

== Aftermath of William IV's reign (1345–1349) ==
=== The reign of William IV of Holland and the war against Utrecht ===
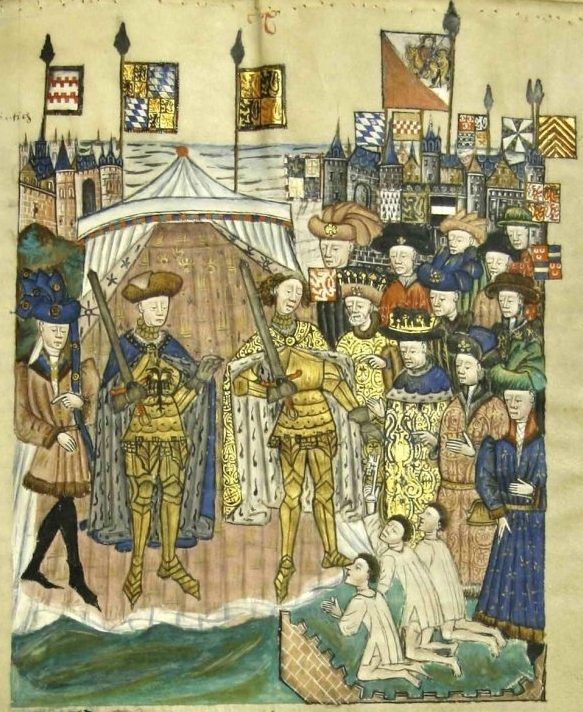
Utrecht residents beg for forgiveness

In 1337 William IV succeeded his father as count of Holland, Zeeland and Hainaut (as William II). William waged many wars, traveled far and wide and participated in many tournaments. As a consequence the finances of Holland fell into utter disarray. For political advice, William continued to rely on Willem van Duvenvoorde, and therefore also on Duvenvoorde's kin: the families Wassenaar, Polanen, Brederode, Boechorst etc. This was to the detriment of families like those of Arkel, Egmond, Heemskerk and Wateringen.

In 1342 John of Arkel had become Bishop of Utrecht. He set about to restore the bishopric's power. In order to prevent this, Count William and his many allies in Utrecht, attacked and started to besiege Utrecht city on 8 July 1345. After six weeks of siege, a truce was concluded, to last until 11 November. In return the citizens of Utrecht had to beg for forgiveness.

William then attempted to restore his authority in Friesland. On 26 September 1345 he led an army that crossed the Zuiderzee and landed near Stavoren. The subsequent Battle of Warns was a disaster: William died and his army returned without him, although his uncle, John of Beaumont, managed to escape. William's death did not end the war with Utrecht. Right after the truce ended, the bishop subdued almost all William's allies in Utrecht, and collected major reparations from them.

County of Holland circa 1350.

=== Succession of William IV ===
William IV/II had no son. Therefore, Holy Roman Emperor Louis the Bavarian had to decide who should succeed him. The candidates were John of Beaumont (William IV's paternal uncle) or one of William IV's sisters, namely Margaret II, Countess of Hainaut (oldest sister and the emperor's wife), Philippa of Hainault (married to Edward III of England), Joanna of Hainaut (married to William V, Count of Jülich) or Isabelle of Hainaut (1323–1361; married to Robert of Namur). In January 1346 the emperor granted the three fiefs to his wife as 'oldest sister and just heir' of count William IV.

In the meantime John of Beaumont had taken control in Hainaut, meaning that its succession to Margaret was quite smooth. It seems that Holland and Zeeland agreed to the succession at a kind of diet at Geertruidenberg in February 1346. In March Margaret arrived in Hainaut, and in April she visited Holland and Zeeland. She also made a new truce with Utrecht, which started on 20 July 1346.

In September 1346 Margaret made her younger son William I, Duke of Bavaria (1330–1389) her lieutenant in Holland, Zeeland and Hainault. He was also made these counties' heir and so was always officially styled as 'waiting' verbeydende to rule over them in his own right.

=== Trouble in Holland and Zeeland ===
In Holland and Zeeland the lieutenancy of William of Bavaria was not a success. After Emperor Louis died in October 1347, King Edward III and the Count of Jülich again came up with their claims to William IV's estate, and allied with the new emperor. In the interior the nobility seized the opportunity to take up their feuds, and indeed it had just cause to be dissatisfied about how the lieutenant and his government favored some families. Soon anarchy and insubordination ruled in these counties. As a result, the finances got even further out of control.

The war against Utrecht also did not go well. On 20 July 1348 the truce ended. On 28 July a battle against Utrecht was lost near Eemnes, leading to the village getting re-attached to Utrecht. William of Bavaria's army then burned the village of Jutphaas, while that of Utrecht burned and looted several Holland villages. The campaign ended with a truce till 11 November.

== Margaret of Bavaria vs William V (1349–1357) ==
=== William's first attempt to become Count of Holland ===
In 1349 Margaret decided that it would be better if William of Bavaria became count of Holland and Zeeland, while she would remain Count of Hainault with William as her lieutenant. In return she wanted to have 15,000 gold guilders, and 6,000 guilders each year. Neither Beaumont nor the cities of Holland were prepared to agree with these conditions, but William then started to style himself as Count of Holland and Zeeland. The Egmonds, Heemskerks and Wateringens, later known as Cods now started to appear in the county's charters.

Meanwhile the bishop had attacked Holland shortly after 25 March 1349. He besieged and burned the small Holland city Oudewater. The army of Holland then marched to Schoonhoven, where it was beaten. On 24 August a truce was made till 11 November 1350.

Margaret had meanwhile travelled from Bavaria to Hainaut. She summoned her unruly son to Le Quesnoy. Here William begged for forgiveness in April 1350. With William removed from Holland, Margaret seems to be in control, but none of the causes of the troubles had been solved.

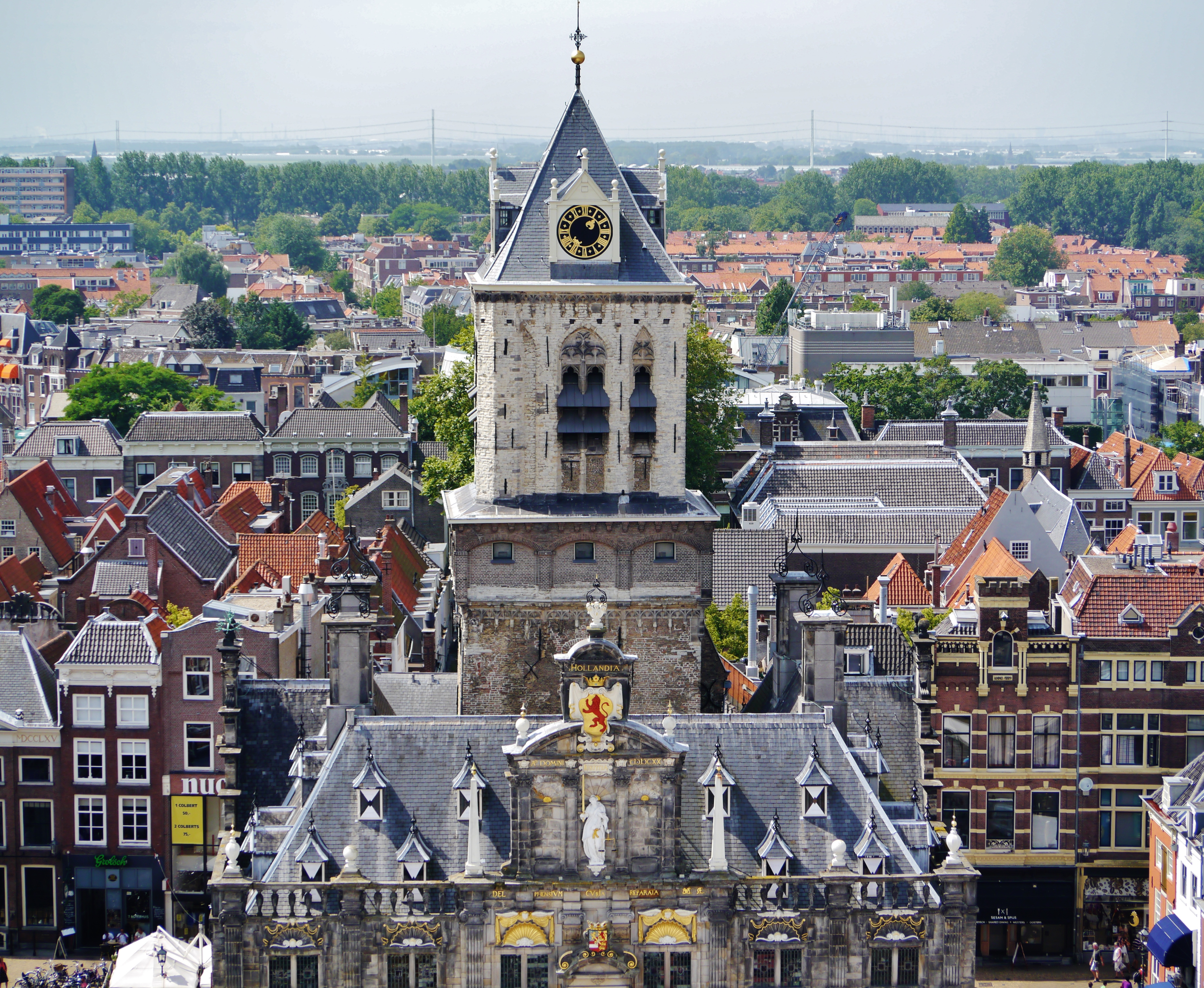
Belfort from 1275 above Delft city hall

The trigger that led to open hostilities was the assassination of the Cod lord Claes Dirkszoon van Zwieten van Drakenburg. This happened on 23 August 1350. The city of Delft and its allies reacted by attacking their enemies, robbing, plundering and taking prisoners. The city next held trials after which a number of prisoners were decapitated and wheeled. The trials and executions were a direct infringement on the high justice of the count of Holland. Meanwhile there was also a conspiracy between part of the nobility and the Bishop of Utrecht.

In September 1350 Margaret and William were both in Geertruidenberg, where William renounced his pretensions on 27 September 1350. John of Polanen, Dirk van Brederode and their party offered to help Margaret. In September 1350 they signed the Hook Alliance Treaty. Meanwhile the dissatisfied nobles and cities formed the Cod League. The earliest proof of the Cod Alliance dates from November 1350.

Margaret and the Hook lords then tried to restore order from Geertruidenberg. They summoned all suspected subjects to send hostages to await their judgement. However, those of Delft and their allies simply did not appear, and said that everything had been done by the orders of their true lord Count William. In the council of nobles and cities that Margaret held, William denied this. He then sent open letters to Delft and other cities, ordering them to submit to Margaret. Delft and its allies simply kept the letters, and conspired with the Bishop of Utrecht, who burned the Binnenhof in The Hague. Margaret stayed in Geertruidenberg till at least 23 October 1350.

With Delft and many cities north of the Hollandse IJssel in open rebellion, Margaret now summoned the council and commoners of the area south of the Hollandse IJssel to Dordrecht. Here a ceremony was held in which the abdication of William was repeated. Margaret then sent William to Hainaut.

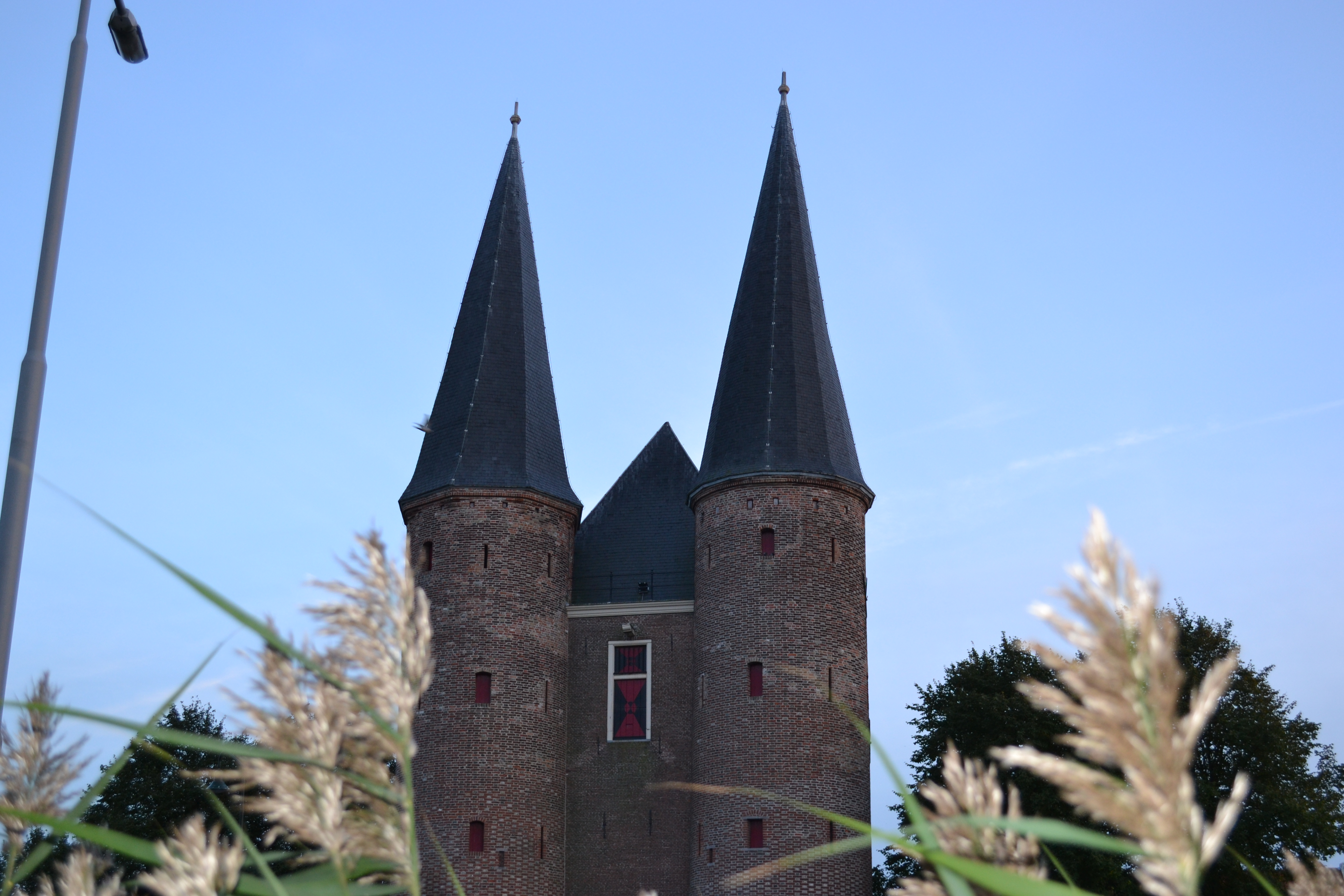
The Nobelpoort in Zierikzee

Margaret next continued to Zeeland to restore order there. She went to Zierikzee to become acknowledged there, and to handle some court cases. While there, she summoned William and John of Beaumont. She wanted to make Beaumont her lieutenant in Holland, Zeeland, and Friesland. Her only condition was that she would retain the high justice. This made the offer unacceptable to Beaumont, and so both returned to Hainaut. In October 1350 Margaret then started negotiations with Edward III of England. The idea was that he would use force to take control in Holland, Zeeland and Friesland, and would be compensated by getting temporary custody of the area.

=== William rebels ===
The attempt to make Beaumont lieutenant might have been reason for William to fear a complete loss of his pretensions. Gerard van Herlaer advised him to contact the Cod party again. In the night of 1-2 February 1351 Gerard van Herlaar and Gerard van Merxem succeeded in freeing William of Bavaria from Burbant Castle in Ath. William then formally allied himself with the Cod party, which acknowledged him as their count. He also allied with the Bishop of Utrecht.

Margaret reacted by making her son Louis her formal heir, and by seeking aid from England. In early 1351 Margaret, her son Duke Louis, and the Lords of Borselen and went to Dordrecht to attempt to subdue William again. While Dordrecht, Middelburg and Zierikzee allied with Margaret, William was acknowledged by Kennemerland and West-Friesland. Diplomatic action by Beaumont and the Queen of England failed. In April 1351 Margaret moved to Calais to negotiate with the English. William then seized Dordrecht. Wolfert III van Borselen joined William, causing Middelburg to flip to William's side.

=== A short war ===
The civil war now erupted in earnest. William of Bavaria's first moves were directed against the many castles that the Hook party held in Holland. Most of these were quickly conquered, others offered significant resistance. On 21 May 1351 Rosenburgh Castle surrendered after a violent siege, which was the first use of gunpowder in the Netherlands. The count then moved on to take Polanen Castle in June 1351. In the same campaign, Binckhorst Castle was also taken after significant resistance. In the north Medemblik Castle offered significant resistance and was besieged in March-April 1351.

On 15 May 1351 William succeeded in concluding a peace which ended the war with Utrecht, which had started in 1345. This was also important, because the parties would also evict each other's enemies from their territory. Meanwhile, some of the stronger Hook castles could not be taken that quickly. Brederode Castle would only surrender on 23 October 1351. Oud Haerlem Castle, owned by John II of Polanen would hold out into 1352. This also applied to Geertruidenberg Castle. Its blockade and siege would last from December 1351 to July 1352.

On the other hand Edward III of England, husband of Margaret's sister Philippa, sent a fleet to Margaret's aid. This was initially successful. In May 1351 Margaret's combined forces won the Battle of Veere. Wolfert III van Borselen died soon after, but it seems that Margaret was not able to profit from her victory. I.e. Middelburg continued to hold William's side.

About six weeks later, the victorious Hooks and their English allies sailed up the Meuse. On 4 July 1351 they fought the Battle of Zwartewaal on the Old Meuse. It was a clear victory for William and the Cods. The English admiral and many Hooks were killed. The outcome ruined Margaret's cause. William quickly moved south to start a Siege of Zierikzee (1351), which surrendered in October.

In December 1351 Margaret handed her last strongholds in Holland (Geertruidenberg Castle, the castle of Vreeland on the Vecht, and Oud Haerlem Castle near Heemskerk) over to King Edward, who changed sides soon afterwards. In February 1352 William married Edward's cousin Maud of Lancaster. Margaret returned to Hainaut and did not succeed in rekindling the war.

=== Peace between Margaret and her son ===
In December 1354 Margaret came to an understanding with her son. William was recognized as count of Holland and Zeeland, she of Hainaut. William would pay a large amount of money and a pension to his mother. Prisoners were released, and a general amnesty was proclaimed.

In July 1356 Margaret died. It left William in possession of the entire Holland-Hainaut inheritance. William did not enjoy his victory for long. In late Summer 1357 he went to England. Shortly after his return he showed signs of insanity. It became so serious that his wife and council decided to call over his younger brother Albert. The count was then locked up, first in The Hague, and then in Le Quesnoy, where he would live imprisoned for 31 years until his death.

== Reign of Albert of Bavaria (1358–1404) ==
=== Albert of Bavaria as regent ===
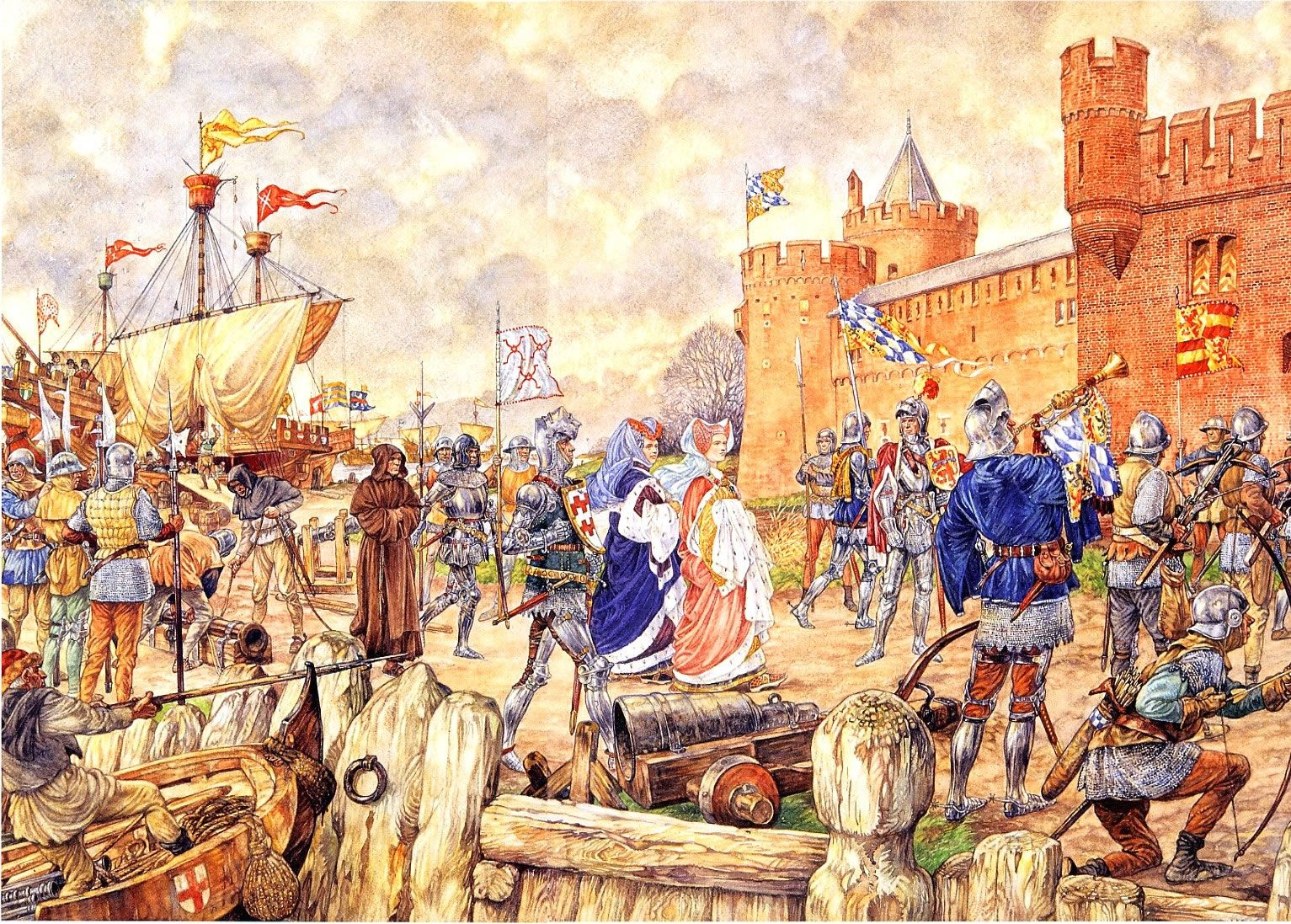
The Siege of Gorkum, 1417

In February 1358 Albert I, Duke of Bavaria arrived in Holland. On 23 February 1358 he was appointed as ruwaard (regent) of Holland. Soon, the acknowledgement in Zeeland followed. Albert started his regency by replacing Jan van Bloemenstein as bailiff of Kennemerland with Reinoud I van Brederode, eldest son of the Hook lord Dirk van Brederode. He also tried to change the Cod government of Delft.

On his first trip to Kennemerland, the new bailiff Reinoud was ambushed near Castricum. Reinoud escaped, but the affair led to the Siege of Heemskerk Castle, which lasted from 4 December 1358 to 24 March 1359. During the siege of Heemskerk Castle, the city of Delft rebelled. Its militia assaulted and destroyed Polanen Castle and Binckhorst Castle. The militia also raided The Hague, and freed the prisoners there.

On 1 April 1359 Albert started the Siege of Delft. The siege of the Cod Stronghold lasted more than 10 weeks. The city surrendered on terms. Its council had to beg for forgiveness, pay 40,000 old shields, and destroy the city walls. The nobles that supported Delft; Hendrik van der Woerd, Gijsbrecht van Nijenrode, Jan van Kervena and Gerard Wisse were not included in the treaty. Van der Woerd tried to escape, but was caught and beheaded.

Nyenrode, Kervena and some others escaped to Heusden Castle. It led to the siege of Heusden Castle, which lasted for more than a year. The castle was surrendered by treaty. The besieged would make their peace with Albert, and go on a pilgrimage to Jerusalem within two years. The internal troubles in Holland then subsided for a while. In 1362 a short war was fought against Guelders.

In 1372 violence erupted near Heusden. The Heerlijkheid Heusden had been transferred to Holland in 1357. However, the limits of the lordship had not been defined that well. Brabant laid claim to Vlijmen and Engelen. Jan van der Veen then raided and burned Onsenoort Castle, southeast of Heusden. In turn Zealand nobles attacked Brabant merchants in their province, while Reinoud van Brederode Lord of Gennep attacked the Campina and looted near Sint-Oedenrode. The army of Brabant then attacked Hainault. In 1374 this conflict ended without any result. Also in 1374, a war against Utrecht started. It ended in 1375. In 1389 the insane William V, who had been locked up since 1357 died.

== Jacqueline of Bavaria vs Philip of Burgundy (1417–1432) ==
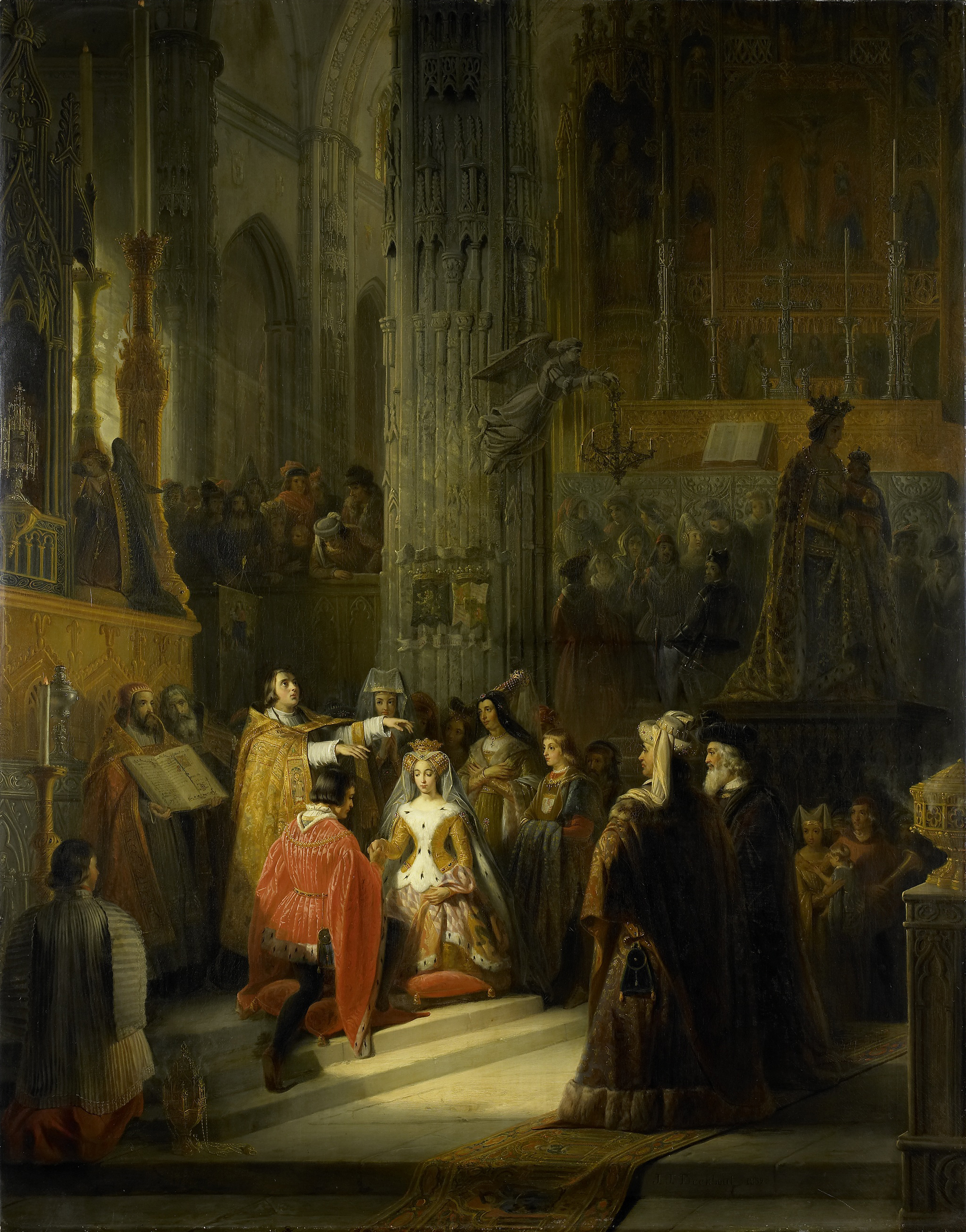
The marriage of Jacqueline of Bavaria, Countess of Holland, and John IV, Duke of Brabant

The main battle re-emerged at the death of Albert I's son and successor William VI, Count of Holland and Hainaut in 1417. Both William's younger brother Bishop of Liege John of Bavaria-Straubing, and his only daughter Jacqueline claimed the county. The Cods chose the side of John, and, after his death in 1425, of Philip the Good, Duke of Burgundy, while the Hooks supported Jacqueline.

Though the Hooks were victorious in a few battles, such as the Battle of Alphen Aan Den Rijn, the result of these events and especially of her defeats at the Battle of Brouwershaven (1426) and Siege of Gouda (1428), was that Jacqueline was allowed to retain the titles of countess of Hainaut, Holland and Zeeland, but that Philip the Good would rule the counties. Philip was named heir to the counties, and Jacqueline, who was childless, was not allowed to remarry without Philip's consent.

The treaty became void when Jacqueline remarried in 1432 with Frank van Borssele, and she had to hand her territories over to Burgundy.

== The Bishopric of Utrecht vs Burgundy ==
The period between 1430 and 1450 remained reasonably calm, but when Philip the Good tried to expand his influence into the Bishopric of Utrecht by appointing his natural son David of Burgundy as Bishop, Hook resistance re-emerged in Utrecht. This led to the Siege of Deventer (1456), and two civil wars, (1470–1474) and (1481–1483), concluded in favor of the Cods and Burgundy after the Battle of Westbroek and the Siege of Utrecht (1483).

== Frans van Brederode vs Maximilian of Austria ==
When the House of Burgundy had died out with the death of Mary of Burgundy in 1482, the Hooks revolted one more time against her husband and successor Maximilian I, Holy Roman Emperor. The revolt was led by Frans van Brederode, but crushed in 1490.

== See also ==
- Counts of Hainaut family tree
- Factionalism in the medieval Low Countries
