= Hook Alliance Treaty =

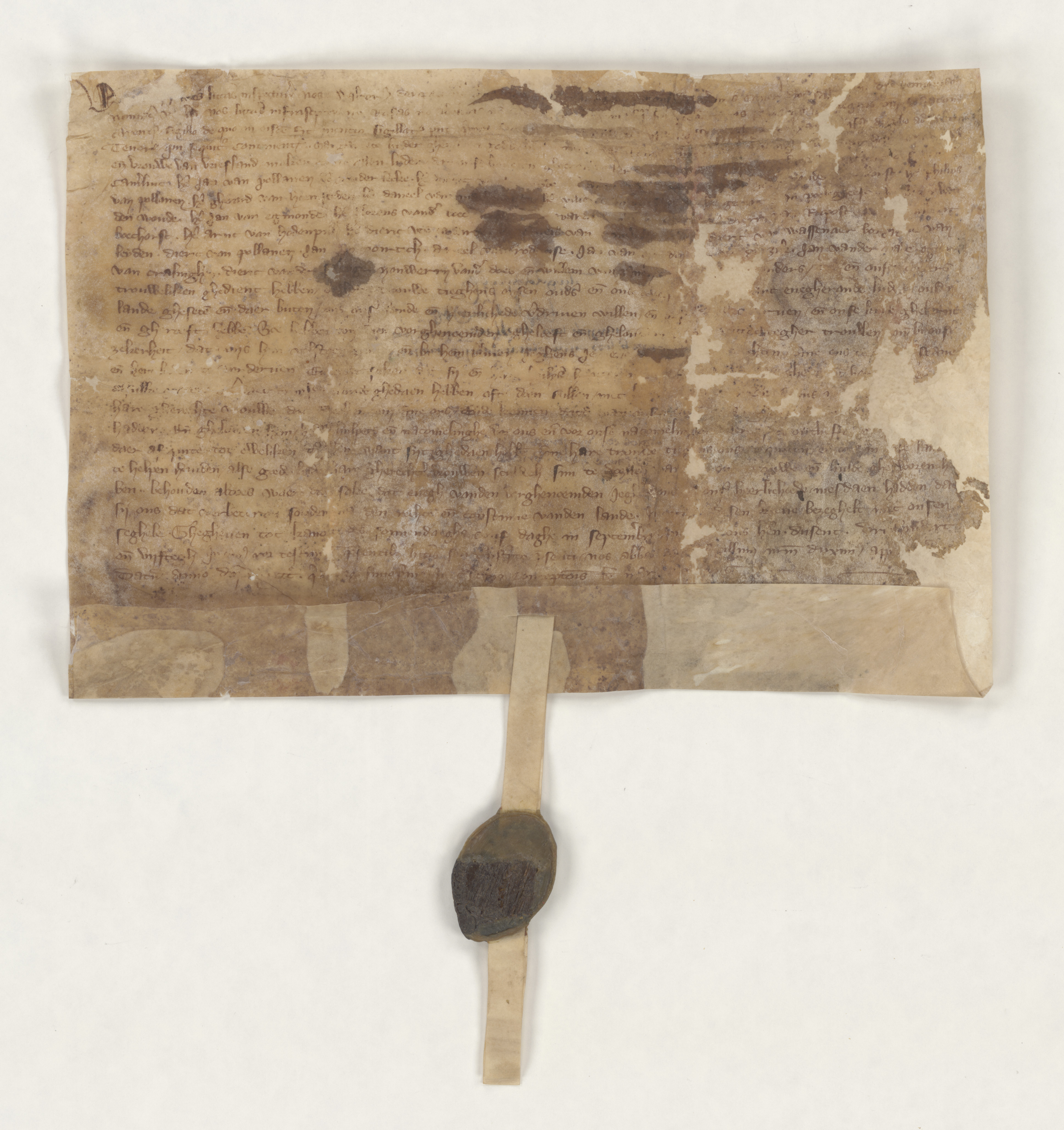
- The Hook Alliance Treaty in the Dutch National Archives
- Type: Alliance
- Drafted: before 5 September 1350
- Original signatories: Margaret II, Countess of Hainaut; Hook Nobles
- Language: Dutch

The Hook Alliance Treaty was signed during the first phase of the Hook and Cod wars in the County of Holland. By this treaty the Hook faction promised to support Margaret II, Countess of Hainaut against her rebellious son William of Bavaria.

== Context ==
=== Origins of the Hook faction ===
The roots of the Hook Faction can be traced back to the reign of Count William III of Holland, who successfully ruled Holland, Zeeland and Hainaut from 1304 to 1337. During his reign the courtier and financer Willem van Duvenvoorde (c. 1290–1353) managed the internal affairs of Holland. This enabled Van Duvenvoorde and his relatives, the families: Wasseaar, Polanen, Brederode, Boechorst, etc. to amass fiefs and great fortunes.

During the short reign of Count William IV (1337-1345) the Duvenvoorde clan continued in favor, while the financial situation got out of hand due to the lifestyle of the count.

=== Chaos after the death of William IV ===
When Count William IV got killed during his failed expedition to Friesland in late September 1345, the nobility had long been divided in two parties: pro and contra Van Duvenvoorde, and was arduous to fight. The Duvenvoorde clan would later become known as the 'Hook' faction, their enemies became known as the 'Cod' faction. Most of the cities of Holland inclined to the Cod faction.

In early 1346 Margaret II, Countess of Hainaut became count of Holland, Zeeland and Hainault. She restored order, and made her second son William of Bavaria her lieutenant in Holland. He was assisted by a council that was again dominated by Van Duvenvoorde, and so nothing was done to quiet the nobility and rebellious cities. Soon, insubordination and anarchy took over in Holland and Zeeland.

=== Signing the Hook Alliance Treaty ===
Before 5 September 1350 the Hook faction signed the treaty later known as the Hook Alliance Treaty (Hoekse Verbondsakte). On 21 September 1350 Margaret and William of Bavaria then came to Geertruidenberg, where she deposed him of all authority in Holland.

William of Bavaria was then sent to Hainault, and practically imprisoned there. The Hooks seemed victorious, but by February 1351, the Cods had freed Count William, who became their leader. The Cod faction also made formal alliances. The most well known is the Cod Alliance Treaty

== Treaty ==
=== Content ===
The Hook Alliance Treaty is a rather straightforward document. It is a list of signatories followed by mutual promises, and sealed in Hainaut.

=== List of signatories ===
The list of signatories shows the extent of partisanship at the time, and can be compared to the list of enemies in the Cod Alliance Treaty.

The Hook alliance treaty uses the word heer in the usual way. If the word heer (Sir) is placed before the name, it denoted that someone was a knight. Squires (except Van Wasseaar) did not get the honorific 'sir'. The word heer after the name indicates that someone ruled a territory, and is therefore translated as 'lord'. In case that somebody is a knight, and rules territory, the second heer / Lord is omitted. E.g. Sir Gerard van Heemstede. However, sometimes this was not possible, because the family names differed. E.g. Sir Philips van Polanen held the Lordship Polanen with Polanen Castle. Sir Jan van Polanen had the Lordship of the Lek as his most prestigious possession.

- The Hook alliance treaty

Knights:

- Sir Willem van Duvenvoorde Lord of Oosterhout
- Sir Jan van Polanen Lord of De Lek
- Sir Dirk van Brederode
- Sir Arnoud van Duvenvoorde
- Sir Jacob van de Binckhorst
- Sir Filips van Polanen
- Sir Gerard van Heemstede
- Sir Daniel van Matenesse
- Sir Willem van Oudshoorn
- Sir Gerard van Poelgeest
- Sir Jacob van der Woude
- Sir Jan van Egmond
- Sir Floris van de Boekhorst
- Sir Herper van de Binckhorst
- Sir Dirk van Raaphorst
- Sir Jan van de Boekhorst
- Sir Arend van Hodenpijl
- Sir Dirk Uten Waarde
- Sir Troveis van Rijneveld
- -
- -

Priest:

- -

Squires:

- Sir Dirk III van Wassenaer Burgrave of Leiden
- Dirk van Polanen
- Jan van Noordwijk
- Daniel van Rodenrijs
- Jan van Mijnden
- Jan van den Zijl
- Jan van der Made
- Ogier van Kralingen
- Dirk van Spangen
- Mouwerijn van der Does
- Willem van Zanen
- The list of Hooks in the Cod treaty

Knights:

- Sir Willem van Duvenvoorde
- Sir Jan van Polanen
- Sir Dirk van Brederode (also erroneously named Willem)
- Sir Arent van Duvenvoorde
- Sir Jacob van de Binckhorst
- In: 'The brothers of John of Polanen'
- Sir Gerard van Heemstede
- -
- Sir Willem van Oudshoorn
- Sir Gerard of Poelgeest
- -
- -
- Sir Floris van de Boukhorst
- Sir Herper van de Binckhorst
- Sir Dirk of Raaphorst
- -
- -
- -
- -
- Sir Harper van Rieden
- Sir Jan van Meerensteyne Aelbertsz

Priest:

- Heer Mathijs van der Burgh

Squires:

- -
- -
- Jan van Noordwijk
- -
- -
- -
- Jan van der Made
- -
- -
- -
- -
- Reinier Dever son of Lord Gerrit
- Gerrit Dever Jansz.
- Floris van Raaphorst
- Christiaan and Wouter van Raaphorst
- The other Raaphorst brothers sons of Gerrit
- Arend van Groeneveld
- Dirk van Groeneveld
- Jan van den Burch
- Jan Symonsz. van der Burch

== The content of the treaty ==
The content of the treaty consisted of two parts. The first part consisted of promises by the Hook nobles and Margaret to help each other. I.e. they allied against an unnamed enemy. The second part consisted of Margaret authorizing the Hooks to use force against this unnamed enemy.

The promise of the Hook lords was a statement that they would always support 'their legal lord empress Margaret of Hainaut and Holland'.

In Le Quesnoy (Hainaut) Margaret added that she would protect these nobles on 5 September 1350. She stated that the signatories had fought against people living in her lands and outside. These people had attempted to evict her party from her lands, and burned and looted in her lands. She then took responsibility for what these nobles had done so far, or would do against this enemy. (Our enemies have done or will do with burning...)
