= Cod Alliance Treaty =

Treaty aligning nobles and cities with William V of Holland

- The Cods were probably named for the scale-like arms of their leader, William of Bavaria
- Type: Alliance
- Drafted: 23 May 1350 or 12 June 1351
- Location: Probably Delft
- Sealed: Disputed
- Original signatories: • William V of Holland; • Cod Nobles; • Various cities in Holland
- Language: Dutch

The Cod Alliance Treaty was a 1350 or 1351 treaty by which a number of nobles and cities allied with William V of Holland against his mother Margaret II, Countess of Hainaut and her allies. It was signed in the first phase of the Hook and Cod wars.

== Context ==
=== Emergence of the Cod Alliance ===
Count William III of Holland successfully reigned over Holland, Zeeland, and Hainaut from 1304 to 1337. An aspect of his reign that caused long-term problems in Holland and Zeeland was that he let Willem van Duvenvoorde (c. 1290–1353) manage the internal affairs of Holland. This enabled van Duvenvoorde and his relatives, including the families Wasseaar, Polanen, Brederode, and Boechorst, to amass fiefs and great fortunes, to the detriment of families including Arkel, Egmond, Heemskerk, and Wateringen. It led to ever-growing irritation and resentment with those families who were left out and steadily lost goods. This formed one of the key causes of the later Hook and Cod wars.

The short reign of Count William IV (1337–1345) was less successful. The favoritism towards the Duvenvoorde clan continued, while the financial situation got out of hand due to the count's lifestyle. Nevertheless, the count kept the peace in Holland.

Count William IV was killed on 26 September 1345 Battle of Warns, part of his failed attempt to conquer Friesland. The lack of a clear heir caused chaos, and confusion was further increased by an invasion by the Bishop of Utrecht. By this time, the nobility had long been divided into two parties, those for and against van Duvenvoorde, and was eager to fight. The Duvenvoorde clan would later become known as the Hook faction, while their enemies became known as the Cod faction. Most of the cities of Holland inclined to the Cod faction.

In early 1346, Margaret II, Countess of Hainaut became countess regnant of Holland, Zeeland, and Hainault. She restored order and made her second son William of Bavaria her lieutenant in Holland. He was assisted by a council again dominated by van Duvenvoorde, and so nothing was done to quiet the nobility and rebellious cities. Soon, insubordination and anarchy took over in Holland and Zeeland.

In September 1350, Margaret deposed William, who had begun to act as count of Holland. With William imprisoned in Hainault, the Hooks seemed victorious, but by February 1351, the Cods had freed Count William, who became their leader.

=== First use of the names Hook and Cod ===
The faction names Hoek (hook) and Kabeljauw (Cod) can only be traced back to the later phases of the Hook and Cod wars (1350–1490). Therefore, the Cod alliance treaty does not refer to a Cod faction or treaty in any way. The first time that the alliance, or faction, was labeled as such was in 1428. The Treaty of Delft (Zoen van Delft) signed in July 1428, explicitly forbade the use of the faction names Hook and Cod: Noch spreke van Houck, noch van Cabeljau (Neither speak of Hook nor Cod). In 1517 a printed chronicle mentioned the cabbeljau (Cod) faction.

== Significance ==
The Cod Alliance Treaty was discovered in archives long after the end of the Hook and Cod wars (1350–1490). Without a direct contemporary reference to this treaty, it is hard to determine its exact significance. This is complicated by the fact that the treaty only survives in a copy, and that these copies are inconsistent about the year it was signed; i.e., 1350 or 1351, see below.

If the treaty was drafted on 23 May 1350, it can be considered one of the causes of the Hook and Cod Wars, i.e., the Cod faction forming an alliance to wage a civil war, before fighting started in earnest in about April 1351. If the document is dated to 23 May 1351 or later, it would have a more defensive character.

What is certain is that the Cod alliance itself already existed before 19 November 1350. On that day Gijsbrecht of Nijenrode joined the alliance of Jan of Arkel, Jan of Culemborg, Jan of Egmond, Jan Persijn of Waterland, Gerrit of Heemskerk, Jan of Wateringen, Gerrit van Egmond, and the cities of Delft, Haarlem, Leiden, Amsterdam, Rotterdam and Schiedam, and mentioned as enemies: Willem van Duvenvoorde, Jan van Polanen, and all who allied with these two.

Even though the exact date of the treaty remains in doubt, the text is very significant. It confirms later writings about the Hook and Cod Wars, and shows the extent of the divisions in Holland.

== Text ==
=== Copies and other treaties ===
The treaty text has survived in copies that are not completely identical. It first appeared in print in a 1636 work by Van Gouthoeven. In 1667, a book by the lawyer Simon van Leeuwen followed.

A treaty with the same date formula (see below) and the same list of Cod Alliance members as one of the treaty texts has been dubbed the Dordtse examplaar (Dordrecht version) by Brokken. This is confusing because it is a different kind of treaty. In it, Count Willem promises not to alienate any part of the county, nor to grant any fiefs or tax exemptions, in the coming year. It therefore has a very different content from the Cod Alliance Treaty.

=== The signatories and adversaries ===
After announcing himself as William, Duke of Bavaria, Count of Holland, and Lord of Friesland, the count begins to sum up his Cod allies. The treaty carefully notes whether these are knights or squires, and whether they are lords of some fief. These allies had stood by the count and would continue to do so to help him remain count and lord in Holland, Zeeland, and Friesland, and to protect him against their mutual enemies, who wanted to drive them out and steal their possessions. The treaty then summarizes the enemies of the Cod alliance. These do attain the rank of knight or squire, but are not marked as lord of a fief.

The Cod alliance members

- Knights:
  - Jan Lord of Arkel
  - Jan Lord of Egmond
  - Jan Persijn Lord of Waterland
  - Gerrit Lord of Heemskerk
  - Jan van Wateringen
  - Jan de Moelnaar
  - Gerrit van Egmond
  - Jan van Blommenstein
  - Willem van Wateringen
- Squires:
  - Jan van Arkel
  - Jan Lord of Culemborg
  - Jan van Noordeloos
  - Hendrik van Heemskerk Hendrikszoon
  - Daniel van Toloysen
- Cities:
  - Dordrecht
  - Delft
  - Leiden
  - Haarlem
  - Amsterdam
  - Alkmaar
  - Medemblik
  - Oudewater
  - Geertruidenberg
  - Schiedam
  - Rotterdam

Their enemies (Hook)

- Knights:
  - Sir Willem van Duvenvoorde
  - Sir Jan van Polanen
  - The brothers of John of Polanen
  - Sir Dirk van Brederode (also erroneously named Willem)
  - Sir Arent van Duvenvoorde
  - Sir Jacob van de Binkhorst
  - Sir Herper van de Binkhorst
  - Sir Harper van Rieden
  - Sir Floris van de Boukhorst
  - Sir Gerard van Heemstede
  - Sir Jan van Meerensteyne Aelbertsz
  - Sir Willem van Oudshoorn
  - Sir Dirk of Raaphorst
  - Sir Geard of Poelgeest
- Priest:
  - Sir Mathijs van der Burgh
- Squires:
  - Jan van Noordwijk
  - Jan van der Made
  - Reinier Dever son of Lord Gerrit
  - Gerrit Dever Jansz.
  - Floris van Raaphorst
  - Christiaan and Wouter van Raaphorst
  - The other Raaphorst brothers, sons of Gerrit
  - Arend van Groeneveld
  - Dirk van Groeneveld
  - Jan van den Burch
  - Jan Symonsz. van der Burch

The count then continues, stating that he takes responsibility for the actions that his helpers and friends take to hurt his enemies. Next comes the important promise that, without the consent of his allies mentioned in the treaty, William would not allow their enemies on his territories, would not make peace with them, and would not restore the possessions they had forfeited. Of course, William did want to make peace with the cities that opposed him. This seems a logical explanation for why the list of his enemies did not include cities.

The same condition of not acting without the consent of his allies applies to William, alienating part of his lands or his future inheritance, the County of Hainault.

William names his younger brother Albert as his successor in case he has no legal offspring. Albert would be bound to the alliance treaty and the promise not to let the Hooks back into his territories. The treaty/letter ends with a note that it was sealed and dated.

== The date of the treaty ==
The original letter or charter of the treaty survived until the seventeenth century. Van Gouthoeven, more or less,, claims to have seen it. In his printed text, it is dated: "Sunday, Beloken Pinksterdag, that is the 23rd Day of May 1351". Beloken Pinksterdag is currently known as Trinity Sunday. The 1667 book by the lawyer Simon van Leeuwen has the date formula "On Sunday on Beloken Pinksterdag, the 14th day of May 1350".

The discrepancy between these dates has triggered a long discussion amongst historians. In 1754, Van Mieris printed 23 May 1751, but noted that this had to be 1750, because Trinity Sunday fell on that day in 1750, but was on 11 June in 1751.

In 1991, historians Prevenier and Smit gave three kinds of reasons why the date of the treaty should be 12 June 1351. The formal reasons centered on the fact that Gouthoeven more or less claimed that he saw the original. They supposed that the treaty survived in city archives in Leiden and Dordrecht, with the Leiden text getting the year corrupted to 1350. Van Leeuwen would have used these texts. Gouthoeven's text and a 16th-century manuscript would stem from copies kept by nobles. The reason for this reconstruction was that Gouthoeven claimed that the original text was with the heirs of Floris's Serclaes, bailiff of Schoonhoven. As regards content, Prevenier and Smit stated that Jan van Noordeloos still supported Margaret in March 1351. Dordrecht would only join William on 16 April 1351, and Geertruidenberg would do so only on 15 June 1351. The third reason centers on the date. On 23 May 1351, Count William was in Zeeland, from 12 to 17 June, he was in Dordrecht, while Geertruidenberg joined his side. The date would then become Trinity Sunday, that is, 12 June 1351. Prevenier and Smit therefore suppose that the calculation 23 May that accompanies the 1351 texts was a later (obviously wrong) addition by a clerk.

In 1982, the historian Brokken dated the treaty to 1350. In 1998, the year 1350 was again defended by Van Wallene. He stated that the medieval extensive date description could only point to 1350, and that a later error could just as well be made in the year as in the day and month. As regards content, he states that by 12 June 1351 the fight was not finished, and many Hooks were still in the county. In general, Wallene appreciates the text as a Cod alliance concluded on 23 May 1350, without William, who would have to join and seal it later. He furthermore states that Hendrik van Heemskerk could have been included in the treaty by his family member Gerard van Heemskerk, and that Jan van Noordeloos was a Cod member before his March 1351 pledge of fealty to Margret. He also states that Dordrecht and Geertruidenberg were members of an alliance in May 1350. With regard to the text, Wallene then continues by stating that the surviving manuscripts all give 23 May, and that Trinity Sunday, 23 May, can only refer to 1350. As regards content, Wallene notes that some notable Cods from 1351 do not appear in it. These were: Gijsbrecht van Nijenrode (joined in November 1350, see above), Gerard of Herlaer, and Gerard van Merxem (joined January 1351). The latter two freed the count from his prison in Hainault in February 1351, and were then included in the county council. Wallene sees only 1350 as compatible with the omission of these lords. The role of the cities would also be strange with a date in 1351, because so little was agreed upon with regard to financial support and influence. Finally, Wallene cites Brokken as claiming that the treaty's content would have made it useless if it had been concluded in June 1351.

In his 2017 work about the Herlaer family, Van Doornmalen gave a logical explanation for why Gerard van Herlaer could have been omitted in June 1351, but also concluded that the debate about the year was still open.

== The Cod City Alliance ==
On 26 September 1351, twelve Cod cities made another alliance. These were the 11 cities of the Cod Alliance Treaty plus Vlaardingen. These made a treaty to mutually protect their citizens from aggression caused by the way the count handled his affairs. This treaty has been very well preserved, with 11 of the 12 city seals still attached.

== Sources ==
- Aurelius, Cornelis; De Hamer, Aarnoud (1517). Die cronycke van Hollandt, Zeelandt ende Vrieslant, met die cronike der biscoppen van Uutrecht (Divisiekroniek). HES Uitgevers, Utrecht.
- Blok, P. J. (1923). Geschiedenis van het Nederlandsche Volk. Vol. I. Leiden: A. W. Sijthoff's.
- Brokken, H. M. (1982). Het ontstaan van de Hoekse en Kabeljauwse twisten. Zutphen: Walburg pers. ISBN 9789060111192.
- Prevenier, W.; Smit, J. G. (1991). Bronnen voor de geschiedenis der dagvaarten van de Staten en steden van Holland. Vol. I. Instituut voor Nederlandse Geschiedenis.
- Van Doornmalen, A. G. J. (2017). De Herlaars in het Midden-Nederlandse rivierengebied (ca. 1075 – ca. 1400) (PDF). Leiden University.
- Van Gouthoeven, Wouter (1636). D'oude chronijcke ende historien van Holland (met West-Vriesland) van Zeeland ende van Utrecht. Hillebrand van Wouw.
- Van Leeuwen, Simon (1667). Handvesten ende privilegien van den lande van Rijnland. Leiden, Rotterdam: Hackens.
- Van Mieris, Frans (1754). Groot charterboek der graaven van Holland, van Zeeland, en heeren van Vriesland. Vol. II. Leyden: Pieter vander Eyk.
- Van Mieris, Frans (1756). Groot charterboek der graaven van Holland, van Zeeland, en heeren van Vriesland. Vol. IV. Leyden: Pieter vander Eyk.
- Wallene, B. F. (1996). Gijsbrecht II van Nijenrode in 1350 betrokken in de Kabeljauwse politiek (PDF). Historische Kring Breukelen. pp. 112–123.
- Wallene, B. F. (1998). Gijsbrecht II van Nijenrode en de (omstreden) datering van de Kabeljauwse Verbondsakte (PDF). Historische Kring Breukelen. pp. 105–108.
