= Frits Niessen =

Dutch politician (1936–2020)

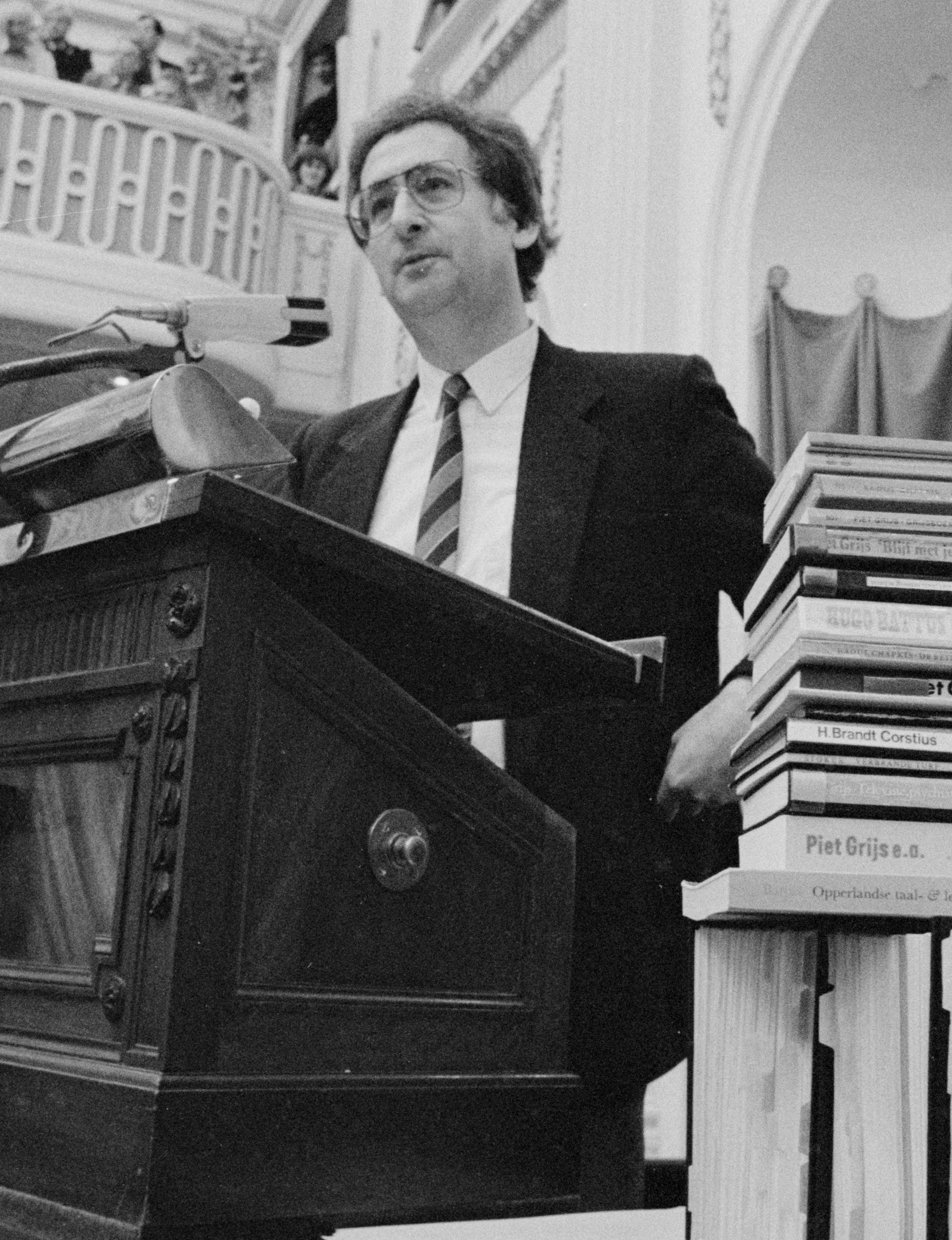
- Niessen in 1985

Member of the House of Representatives
- In office 6 October 1977 – 6 January 1978
- In office 27 August 1980 – 17 May 1994

Personal details
- Born: Godefridus Adrianus Quirinus Niessen; 16 September 1936 Raamsdonk, Netherlands
- Died: 23 October 2020 (aged 84) Raamsdonksveer, Netherlands
- Party: Labour Party

Godefridus Adrianus Quirinus "Frits" Niessen (16 September 1936 – 23 October 2020) was a Dutch politician. He served in the House of Representatives for the Labour Party between 1977 and 1978 and once more from 1980 to 1994.

== Life ==
Niessen was born in Raamsdonk on 16 September 1936. He was a primary school teacher in Raamsdonksveer from 1958 to 1963 and subsequently was a Dutch teacher at the HAVO in Dongen from 1963 to 1980.

Niessen became a member of the House of Representatives for the Labour Party on 6 October 1977 and served until 6 January 1978. He left the House after the formation of the First Van Agt cabinet, which saw Labour Party members from the Den Uyl cabinet return to seats in parliament. Niessen returned to the House on 27 August 1980 after Jan Pronk left. During his time in parliament he was the party spokesperson for interior and cultural affairs, but was also occupied with education issues. In 1985 he interpellated Minister Elco Brinkman about his refusal to have Hugo Brandt Corstius be given the P. C. Hooft Award. In 1989 he was influential in preventing the closure of the Institut Néerlandais in Paris. Niessen remained a member of the House until 17 May 1994.

Niessen was a long-time editor of Ons Erfdeel, he started contributing shortly after its foundation in 1957 and ultimately became deputy editor-in-chief in 1977, which he remained until 2016. In the 1990s he was recipient of the ANV-Visser Neerlandiaprijs for individual merit for four decades of work for Dutch language and culture. Niessen was co-chair of the Commission Cultural Convention Flanders-The Netherlands (Dutch:Commissie Cultureel Verdrag Vlaanderen-Nederland) together with Hugo Weckx. Upon his departure from the commission in 2006 he was made a Commander in the Order of the Crown. In 2009 he became an honorary citizen of Geertruidenberg. He died on 23 October 2020 in Raamsdonksveer.
