= Batadorp =

- Neighbourhood
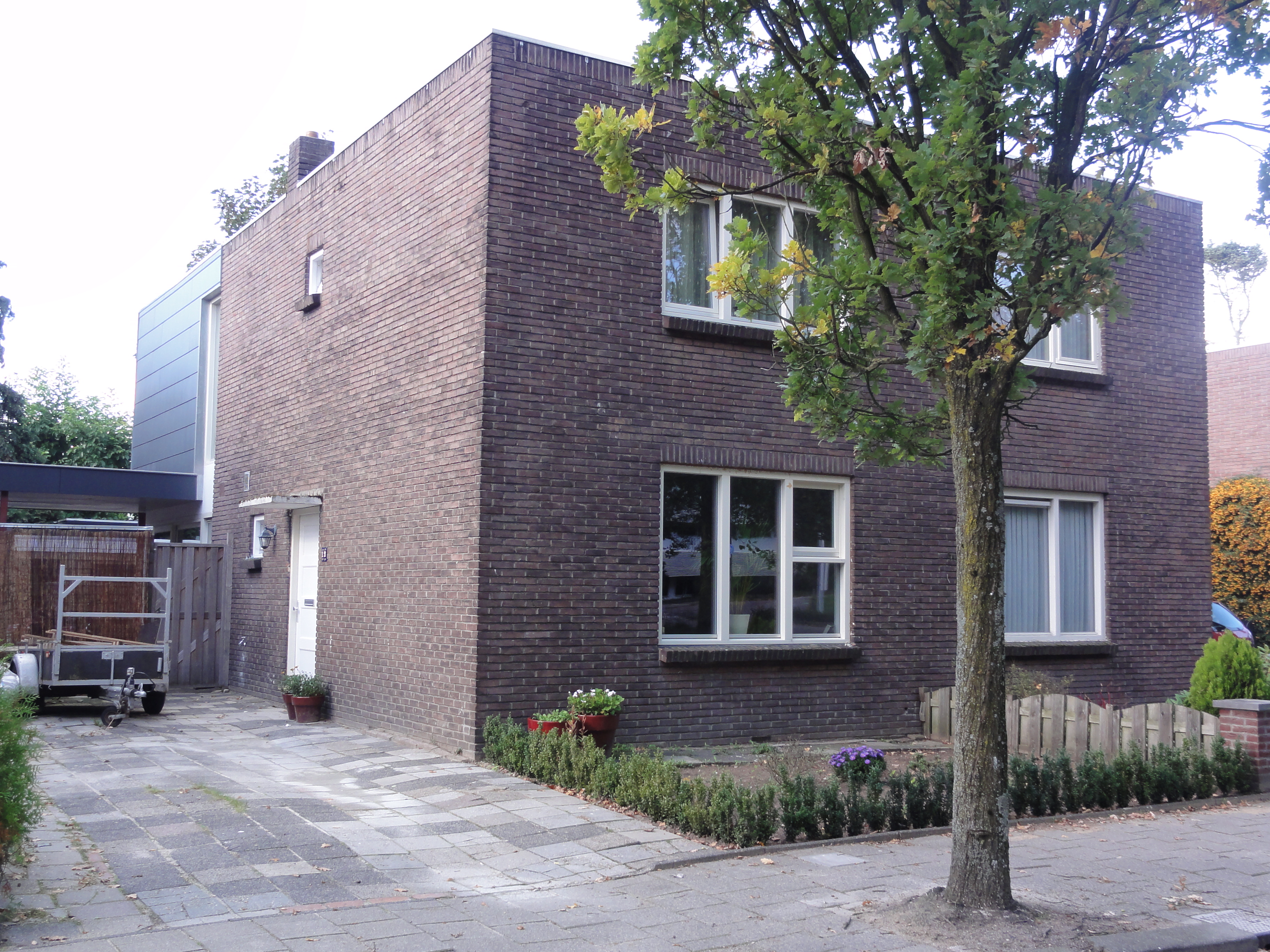
- House in Batadorp, Europaplein 12.

- Location in the province of North Brabant in the Netherlands Batadorp (Netherlands)
- Coordinates: 51°29′28″N 5°23′46″E
- Country: Netherlands
- Province: North Brabant
- Municipality: Best

Area
  - Total: 0.25 km^{2} (0.097 sq mi)
- Elevation: 17 m (56 ft)

Population (2021)
  - Total: 495
  - Density: 2,000/km^{2} (5,100/sq mi)
- Time zone: UTC+1 (CET)
  - Summer (DST): UTC+2 (CEST)
- Postal code: 5684
- Dialing code: 0499

Batadorp is a model village or neighbourhood of the Dutch town of Best, just northwest of Eindhoven, where the Czech Bata Shoes company built a factory in 1934 on land that it bought from the municipality.

Bata sought expansion abroad, partly to circumvent tariffs, and built factories and entire villages. Bata had operated shops in the Netherlands since 1922, and chose to locate in Best because land and labour were cheaply available. It also had good transport links, being at the junction of the Wilhelmina Canal with the Beatrix Canal and close to a railway. The factory it built there in 1933 was an exact copy of the headquarters in Zlín.

At that time, Bata already had 28 shoe shops in the country, and this number grew to 150 in 1961. Many Bata shops had their own shoe repair and pedicure departments. The factory made ladies', men's, children's and sports shoes.

So that the employees could live near the factory, Bata built a town of 130 homes, separated from the centre of Best by the canal, along with schools, medical services and a hairdressers'. Bata built other such villages wherever it had factories.

Bata promoted order and cleanliness. Thus, the houses in the village have flat roofs, as attics would only encourage people to store clutter. The workers were not allowed to wear clogs, as Bata produced suitable footwear. The emphasis on hygiene can be seen as paternalistic but resulted in a level of welfare that was far ahead of its time. The company also established sports clubs, a theatre, a brass band and a volunteer fire brigade. From the 1960s shoe production was moved to low-wage countries and Batadorp was sold to the municipality of Best. The network of shops - even the factory shop - had closed by 1996. The original buildings of Batadorp are now an industrial heritage site. However, production continues at a reduced level. It now belongs to the Bata Protective division which was created in 1970 and makes speciality shoes. In 2008 about 160 employees produced 900,000 pairs of safety shoes and 1 million pairs of safety socks. The headquarters of the global division is located there.

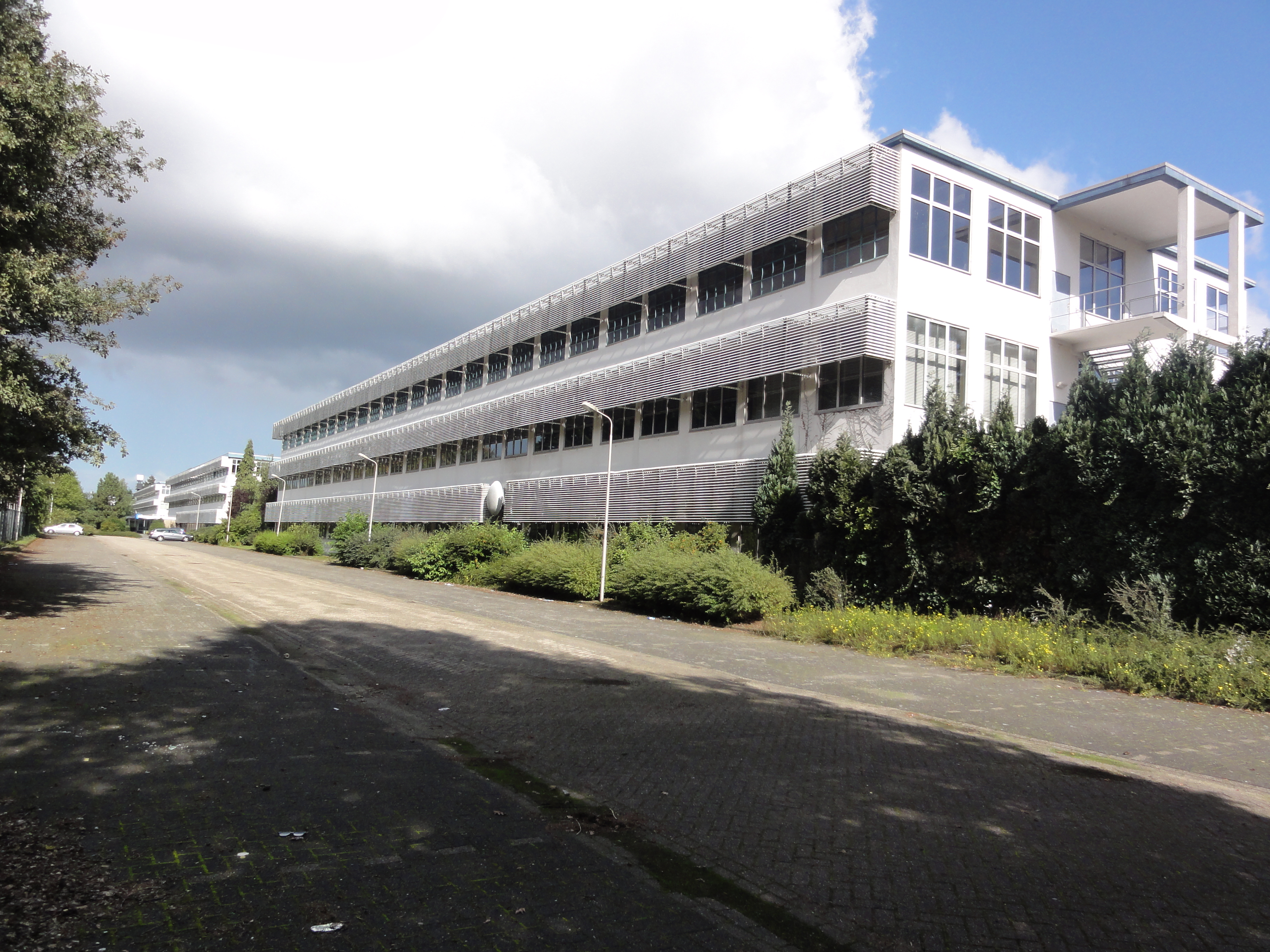
The three Bata factories at Batadorp in line.

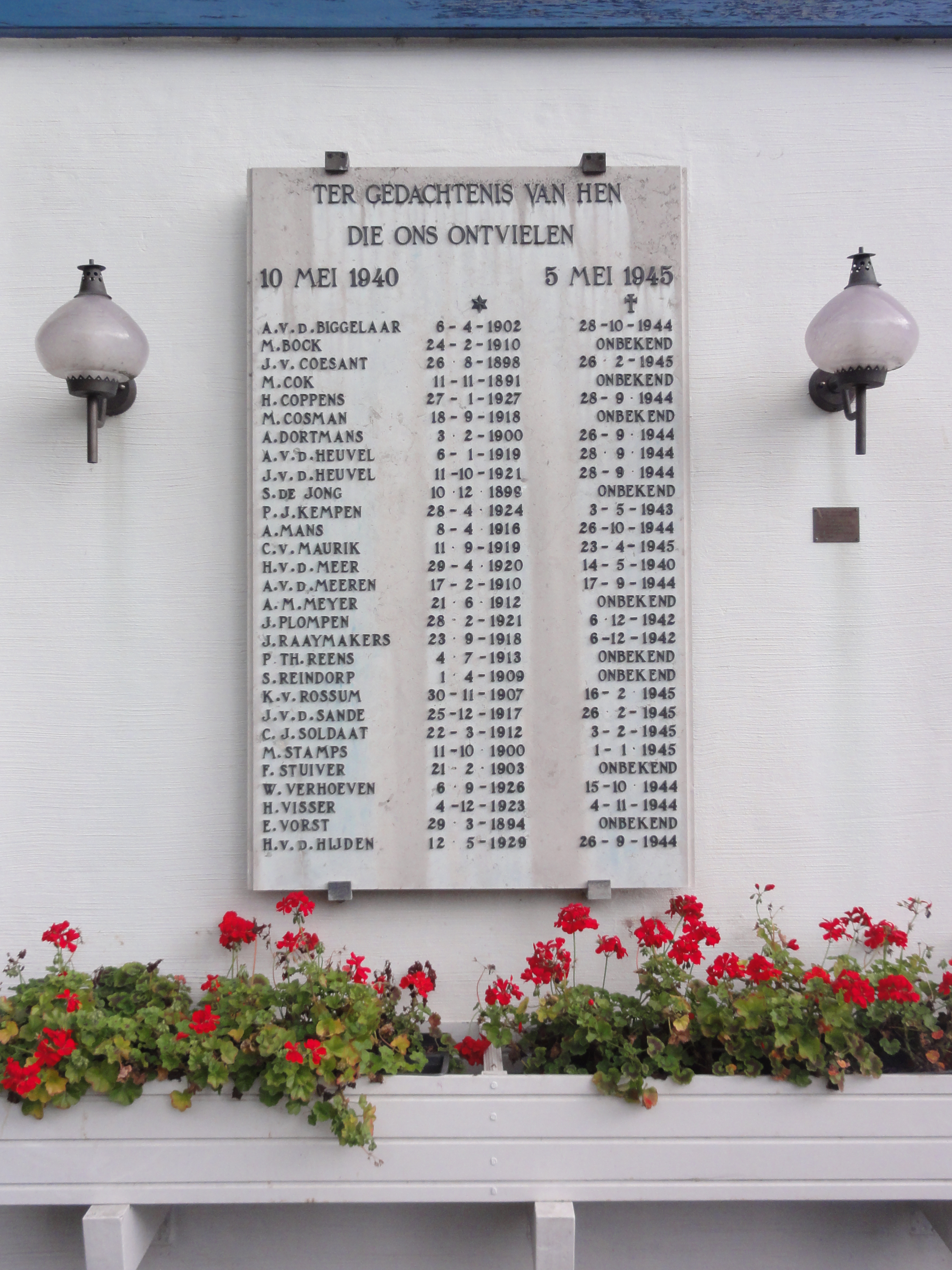
War memorial of Bata factory, Batadorp.

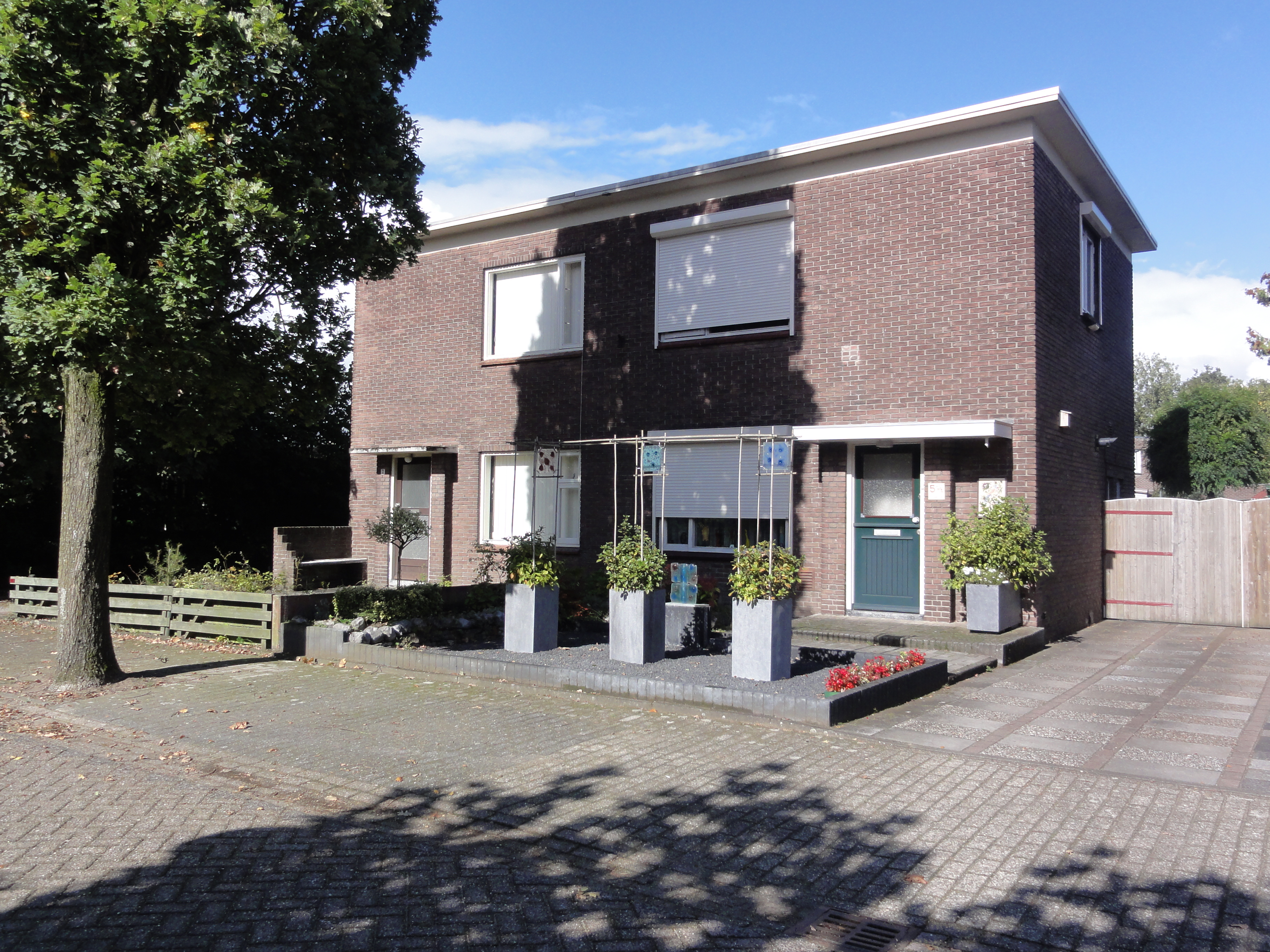
House in Batadorp, Batalaan 5.

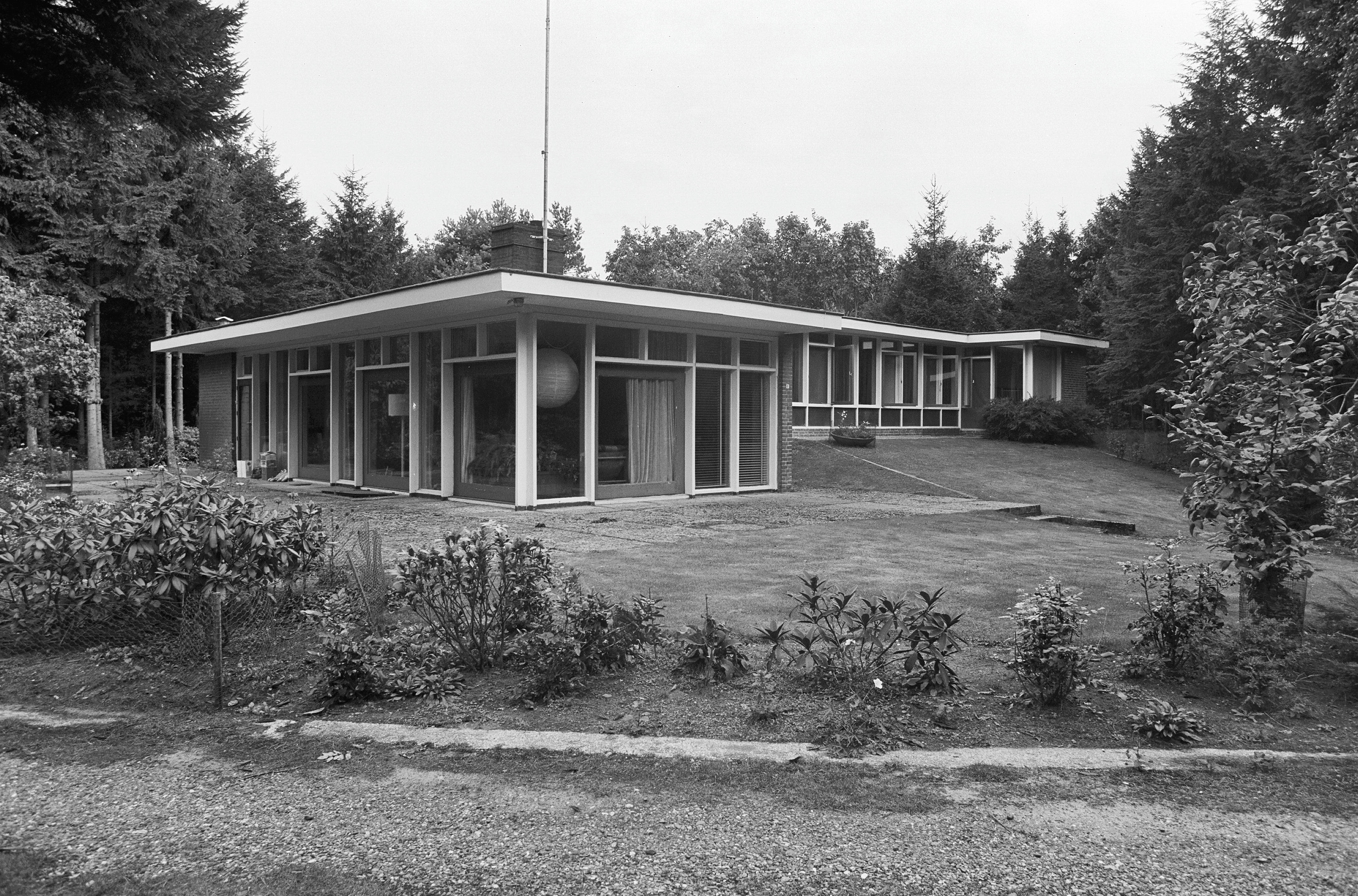
Villa in Batadorp

== Bibliography ==
- Ondřej Ševeček, Martin Jemelka : Company Towns of the Bat'a Concern: History - Cases - Architecture, Steiner 2013
- Batadorp on plaatsengids.nl
