= Donge =

Donge may refer to:

- Donge local dialect (Language) Dholuo (tribe in Kenya commonly known as Luo) word for Right
- Donge (river), river in the Dutch province of North-Brabant
- Donge County, in Shandong, China
- Donge Constituency, a parliamentary constituency in Zanzibar North Region
