= Raamsdonksveer =

- Town
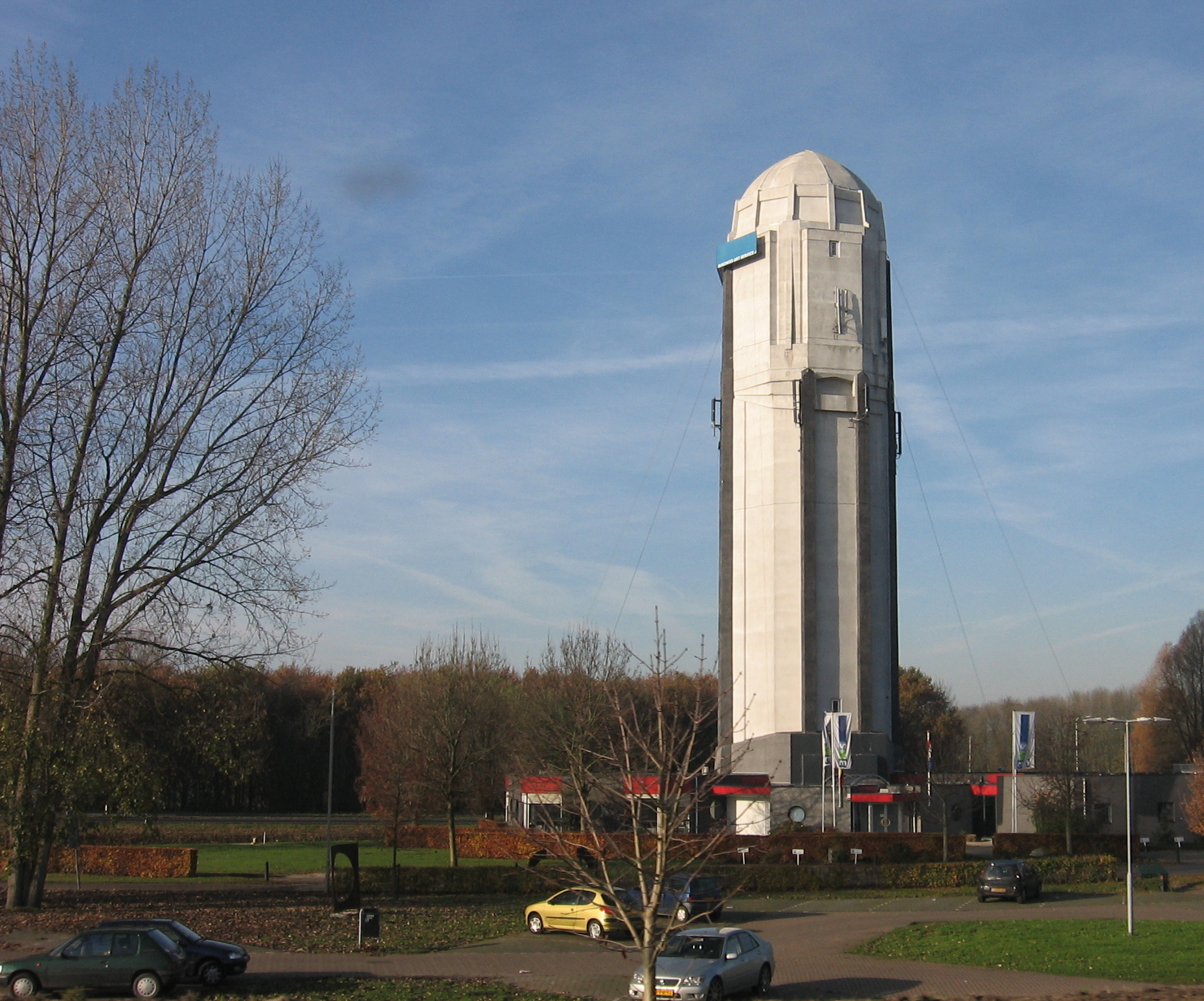
- Watertower (Hendrik Sangster, 1925)

- Location in the province of North Brabant in the Netherlands Raamsdonksveer (Netherlands)
- Coordinates: 51°41′N 4°52′E
- Country: Netherlands
- Province: North Brabant
- Municipality: Geertruidenberg

Area
  - Total: 10.11 km^{2} (3.90 sq mi)
- Elevation: 1.1 m (3.6 ft)

Population (2021)
  - Total: 12,470
  - Density: 1,233/km^{2} (3,195/sq mi)
- Time zone: UTC+1 (CET)
  - Summer (DST): UTC+2 (CEST)
- Postal code: 4941 & 4942
- Dialing code: 0162

Raamsdonksveer is a town in the Dutch municipality of Geertruidenberg, North Brabant. It lies on the east side of the Donge River, opposite Geertruidenberg. It is a regional center of commerce and industry. Raamsdonksveer lies between Oosterhout and Hank

== History ==
The village of Raamsdonksveer was first mentioned between 1649 and 1672 as "'t Ransdoncx Veer", which means the ferry of Raamsdonk. It developed around the ferry over the Donge which formed part of the road from Dordrecht to Breda.

In 1336, the Carthusian monastery Het Hollandse Huis was founded near the village, but was destroyed during the Reformation at the end of the 16th century. The Dutch Reformed church is an aisleless church in Gothic Revival style, which was built in 1860. The former water tower was built in 1925. In 1988, office buildings were added near the base of the tower.

Raamsdonksveer was home to 1,856 people in 1840. In 1886, a railway station opened on the Langstraat Line ( connecting Lage Zwaluwe to 's-Hertogenbosch). But it was closed in 1950.

Raamsdonksveer was part of the municipality of Raamsdonk until 1996, when it was merged into Geertruidenberg.

== Gallery ==
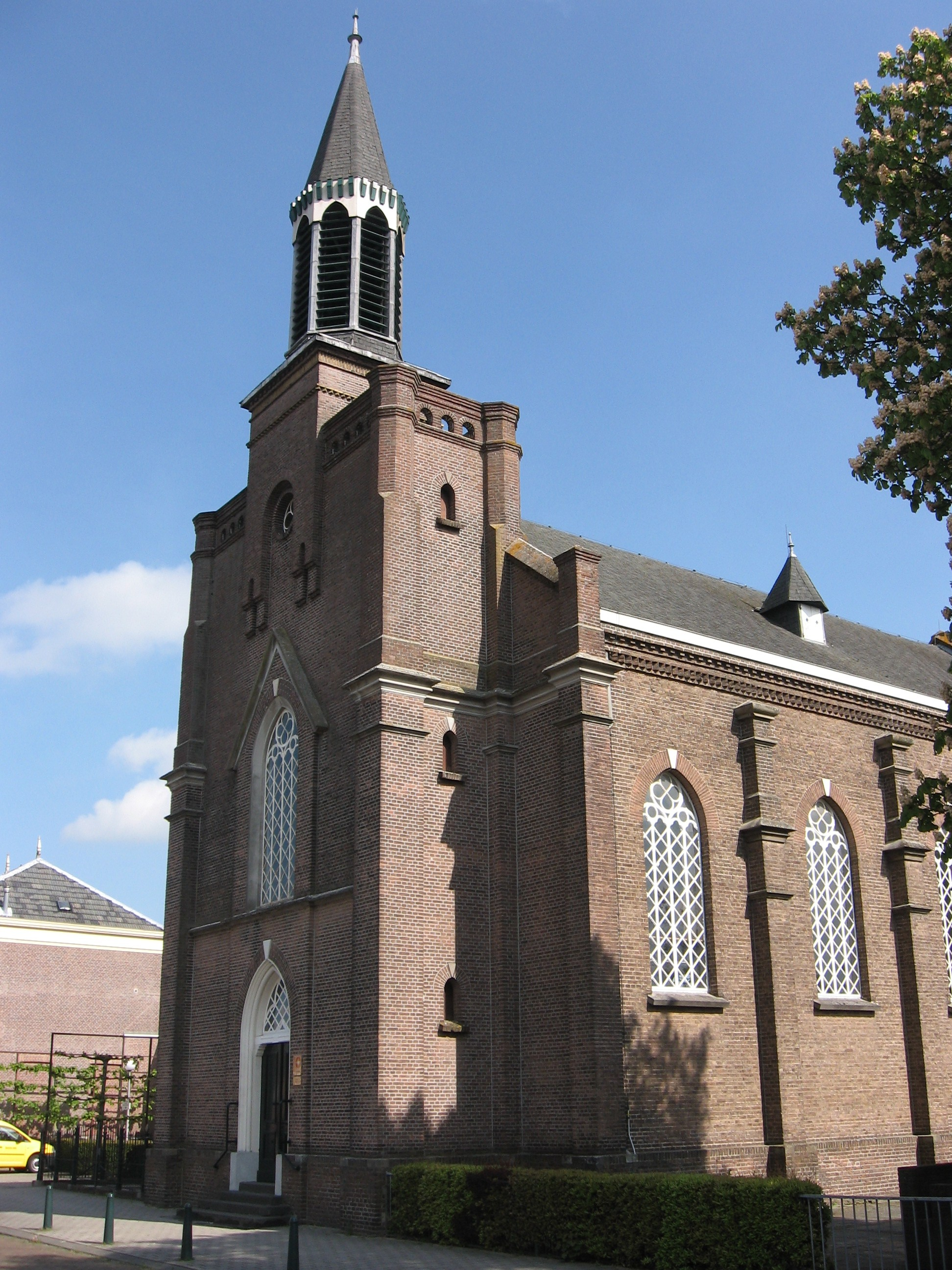
Dutch Reformed church

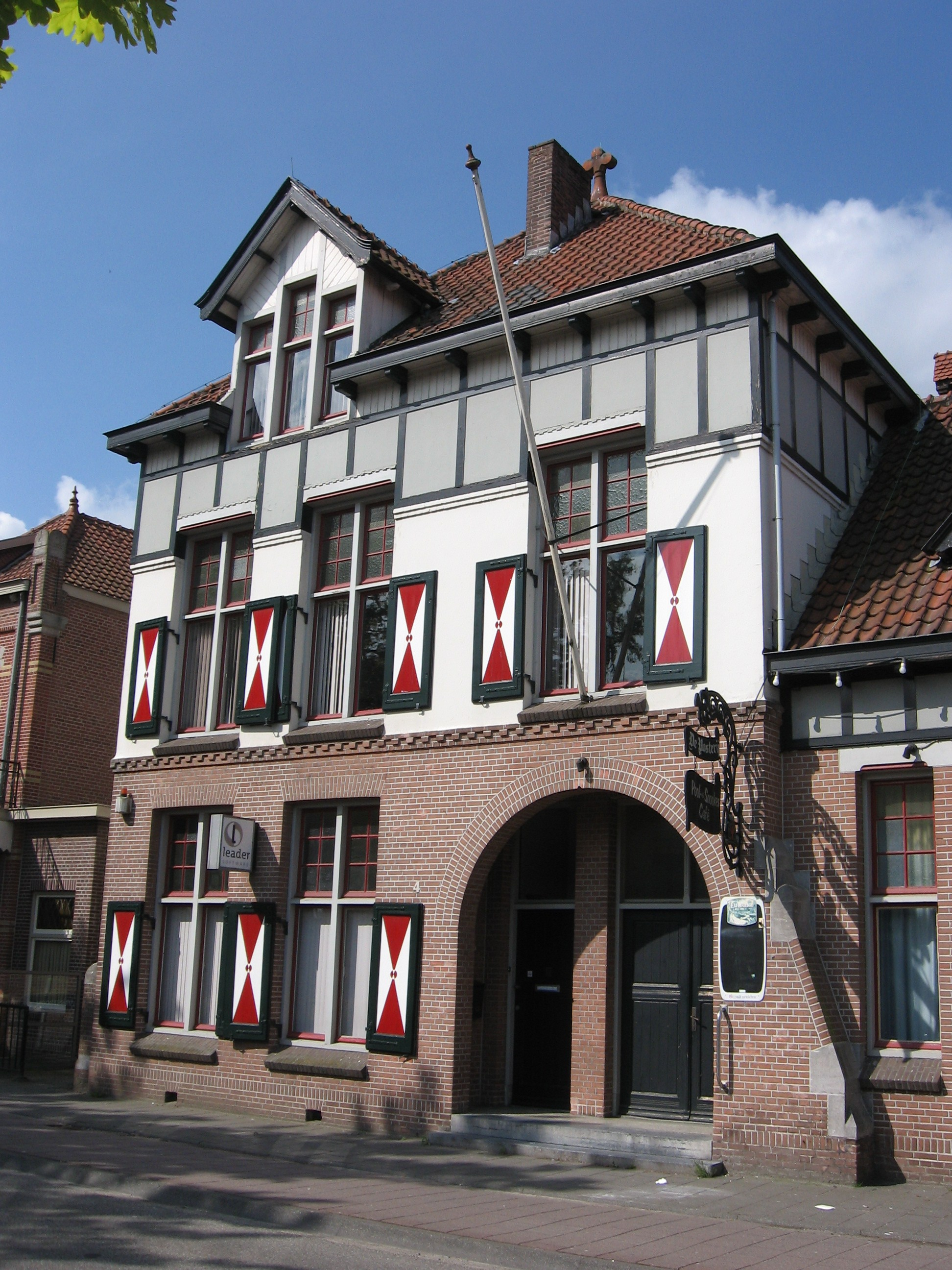
House in Raamsdonksveer

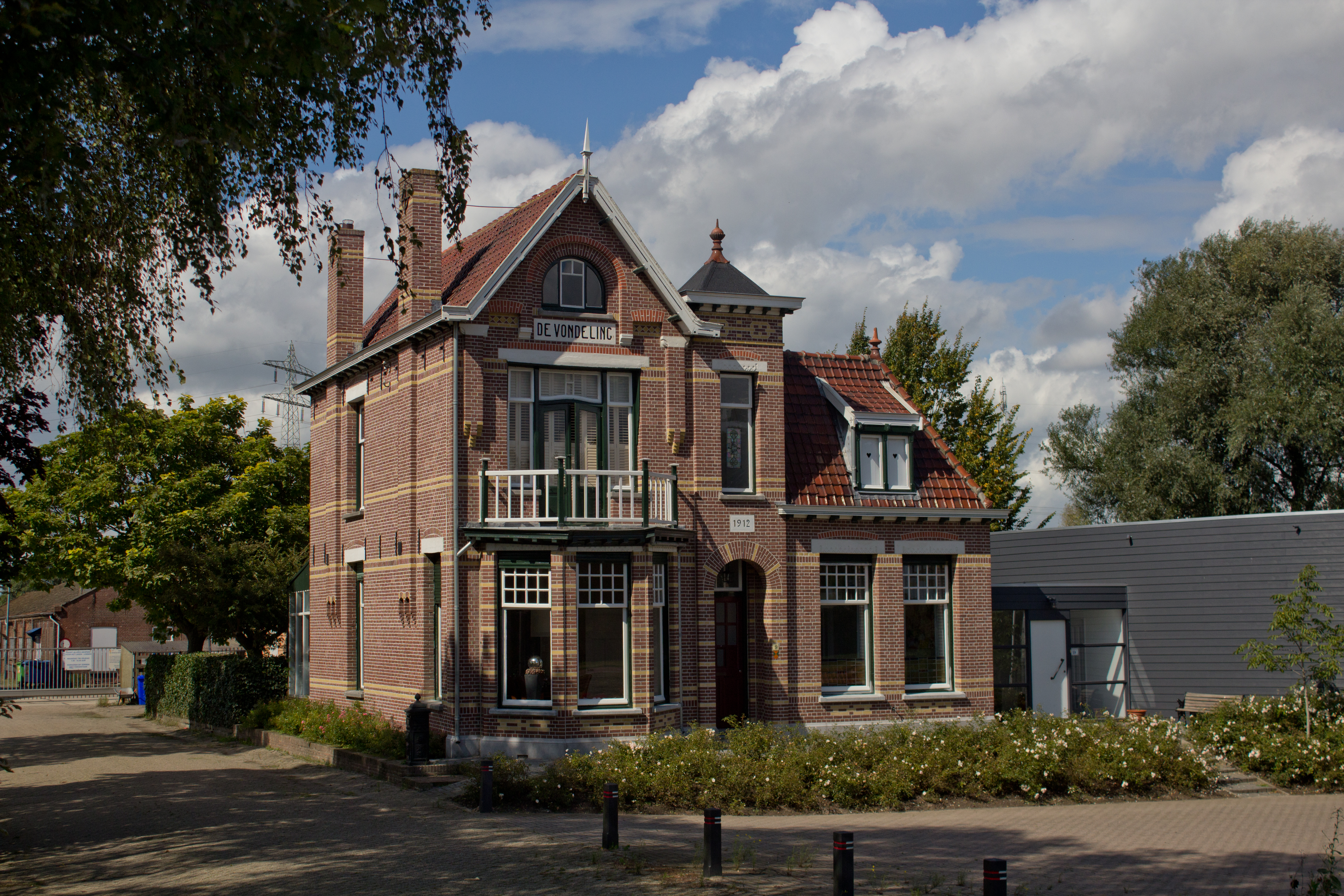
Villa in Raamsdonksveer

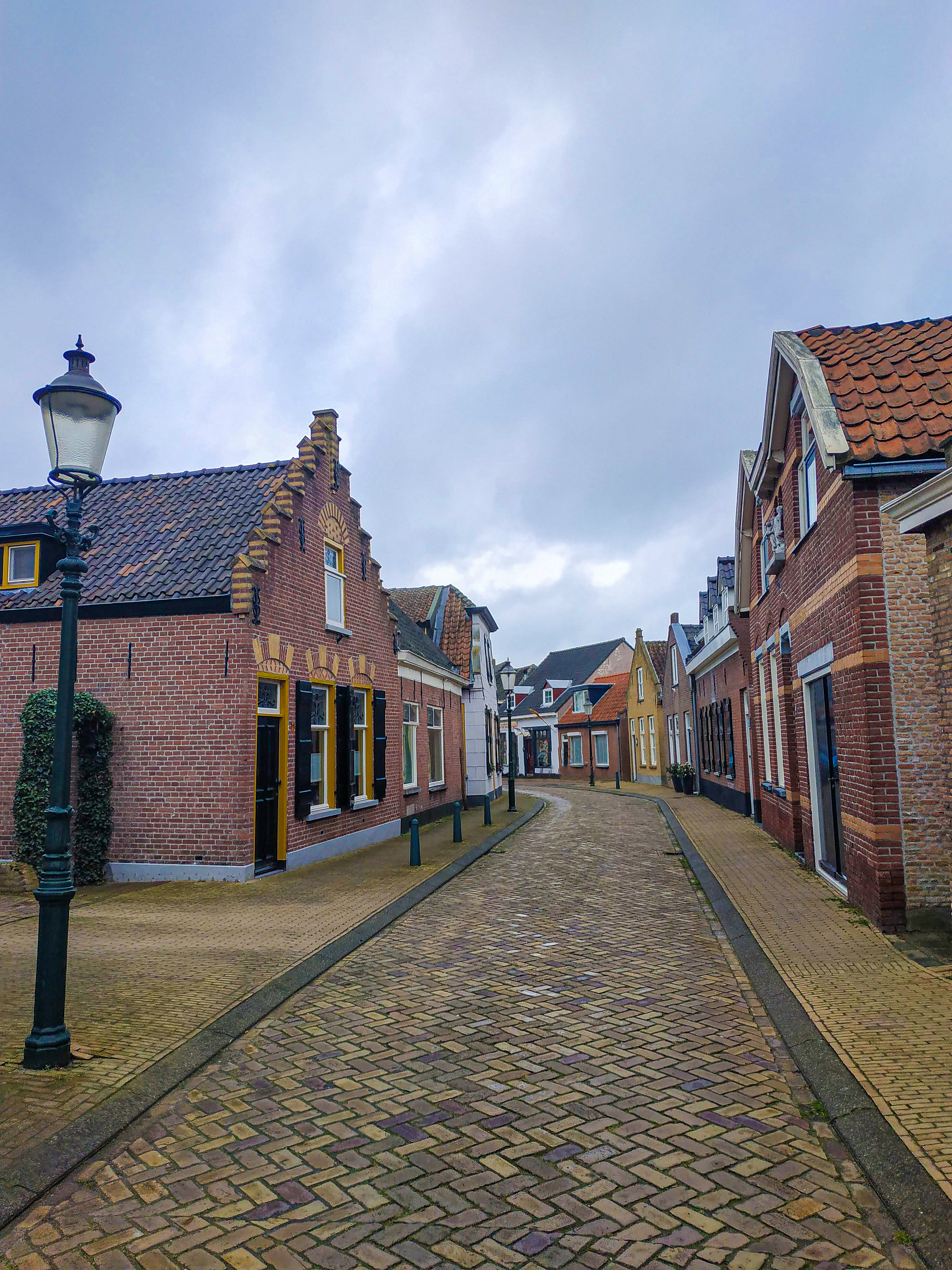
Street in Raamsdonksveer
