= Wilhelmina Canal =

Canal in the Netherlands

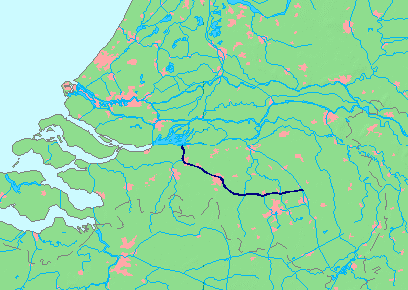
- Map of the Wilhelmina Canal
- Interactive map of Wilhelmina Canal
- Country: Netherlands

Specifications
- Length: 68 km (42 miles)
- Status: Open

History
- Date completed: 1923

Geography
- Start point: Zuid-Willemsvaart near Laarbeek
- End point: Amer near Geertruidenberg (originally Statendam, near the Donge)
- Beginning coordinates: 51.519991°N 5.646959°E
- Ending coordinates: 51.709720°N 4.825620°E

The Wilhelmina Canal is a canal in North-Brabant, Netherlands. It connects Tilburg to the Meuse, and continues to the east to connect to the Zuid-Willemsvaart north of Helmond.

== Characteristics ==
The Wilhelmina Canal runs from the Zuid-Willemsvaart in Laarbeek to the Amer (Meuse) just west of Geertruidenberg and is 68 kilometers long. The section from Geertruidenberg southward to Lock I in Oosterhout is suitable for ships of up to 135 * 11.5 * 3 m (CEMT class Va). The section from Lock I in Oosterhout to Lock II at the western border of Tilburg is suitable for CEMT IV limited to 90 * 9.60 * 2.70 m.

East of Lock II Tilburg, the canal still has it old dimensions. The section of from Tilburg to the Beatrix Canal, is suitable for ships of up to 650 tons capacity (CEMT II), but is only 2.30 m deep on average, and even only 1.90 m deep at some point. Therefore, CEMT II ships on this section are not fully loaded and maximum dimensions are 63 * 7.20 * 1.90 m. Here average width of the canal is 25–30 m.

East of the Beatrix Canal conditions are better again. In recent years improvements have been made to the connection from the Beatrix Canal to the Zuid-Willemsvaart, so that long combinations, and eventually CEMT IV ships can use this section. Here maximum ship dimensions are 110 * 6.70 * 3 m.

== History ==
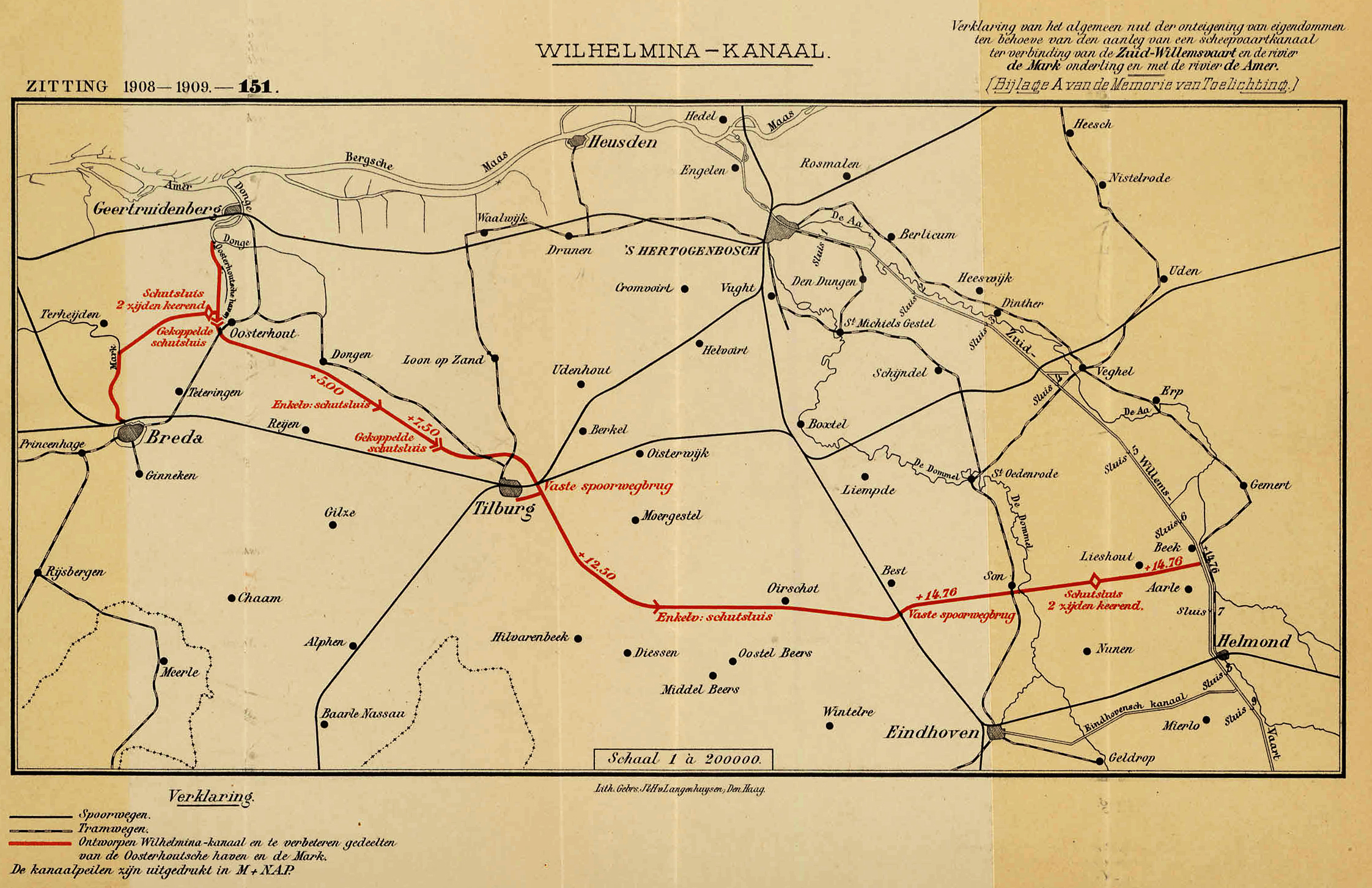
1908 plan for the Canal

=== First ideas to dig a canal to Tilburg ===
Whatever the eventual form of the canal, the primary reason to dig it was to connect Tilburg to the Dutch system of inland waterways. By the end of the 18th century, Tilburg was the biggest town of the Meierij van 's-Hertogenbosch, but all transport to and from Tilburg took place over unpaved roads. In 1863 the Breda–Eindhoven railway connected Tilburg to Breda, and in 1865 to Eindhoven. At about that time the textile industry of Tilburg was booming, and used an enormous amount of coal.

In April 1869 J. van de Griendt proposed a canal from the Zuid-Willemsvaart to Tilburg. It was to start between locks 5 and 6 or 6 and 7, and to take its course along Sint-Oedenrode, Liempde, Moergestel and Oisterwijk to Tilburg. It could easily transport a lot of water for use by the emerging Tilburg industry. A facility would have to be made to discharge this water towards the Meuse. The plan took into account that making a canal from Tilburg to the Oude Maasje (Meuse) was much more costly, because of the greater difference in height. However, this could be done at a later time.

In July 1869 the provincial government allowed 1,500 guilders to investigate a plan for a canal from the Zuid-Willemsvaart over Tilburg to Dongen or 's Gravenmoer. This was a plan by the then chief engineer, but the investigation was to include Van de Griendt's plan. In 1873 a commission for construction of the Tilburg canal made a report. It could not make a specific plan, because the municipalities along the canal were not prepared to give enough funding. In 1876 the commission sent in a report for a small canal from the Zuid-Willemsvaart to Tilburg, which would cost 750,000 guilders. In July 1876 a decision was postponed, and in July 1877, the provincial government refused to contribute the 250,000 guilders needed as her contribution to the canal.

=== The Bake plan ===
In 1876 the provincial Waterstaat of North Brabant began to operate. F.C. Bake from the Staatsspoorwegen became its head and chief engineer. In April 1878 Bake and the municipalities of Breda, Tilburg and Oosterhout were planning a canal from Eindhoven via Tilburg to the Amer. This was the first plan that resembled the current Wilhelmina Canal.

In 1889 the need for canal was again discussed in the provincial government. The chief engineer of Waterstaat came up with a plan in June 1890. It had the same size as the Zuid-Willemsvaart, and would start there between locks 6 and 7. The description of the section east of Tilburg closely resembles the canal as it would later be built. There was also a variant in which the section between Tilburg and the Zuid-Willemsvaart would be narrower, i.e. only 6 m wide at the bottom of the canal. The plan for the locks foresaw a lock with a double set of gates near the Zuid-Willemsvaart, to this lock could also operate if the level of the Zuid-Willemsvaart was lower. Regular locks would lift 2.5 m. Two double (sequential) locks would lift 5 m. A significant change from the 1877 plan was that the canal would end at Oosterhout instead of at the Moerdijk. This had to do with the Amer becoming more navigable in the meantime. The plan was signed by engineer Schevichaven. A letter by chief engineer Bake was attached to the plan. The estimated cost for the plan was 4,512,000 guilders.

The plan came to nothing, primarily because the national government did not want to execute it. The province thought it too risky to do it on her own, also because the maintenance would then also become a provincial task. The discussion centered on whether the canal was a local interest, or a national interest. In the senate Jacob van den Biesen noted that the government thought projects like the Nieuwe Waterweg (25 million), the North Sea Canal (12.5 million), and the Nieuwe Merwede (20.5 million) to be of national interest, but that the result was that North Brabant had to pay for these, but got nothing in return, not even 2 million for the canal. Van den Biesen then suggested that he might take a principal stand, and vote against all other projects if Brabant got nothing.

The name Wilhelmina Canal dates at least to April 1901. In 1903 Minister Johannes Christiaan de Marez Oyens made some changes to the plan, leading to a significant increase in cost. On 9 February 1904 the provincial government of North Brabant voted to contribute 2.5 million guilders to construction of the canal by the national government. In November 1904 a law to construct the canal was sent to the House of Representatives, but it soon became clear that this law would only lead to actual construction of the canal if funding became available. The people of North-Brabant thought that they had been fooled by the minister. On 11 May 1905 the law for the canal was approved by the House of Representatives.

=== Construction starts ===
In spite of the non-committal character of the law, the government started to delimit the future course of the canal in July 1906. Soon after, 500,000 guilders for the canal were added to the 1907 budget. By May 1907 a detailed map of the section in Tilburg was published. In these years a lot of time and money was spent on buying, and where necessary compulsory purchase, of grounds for the canal. In November 1908 the compulsory purchase law for the canal was treated in the House of Representatives. Overall construction was slow. In 1911 there was a budget of 750,000 guilders. Of this sum 600,000 was spent on purchasing land, and only 75,000 were spent on construction. It led to another heated debate in The Hague.

=== West of Tilburg ===
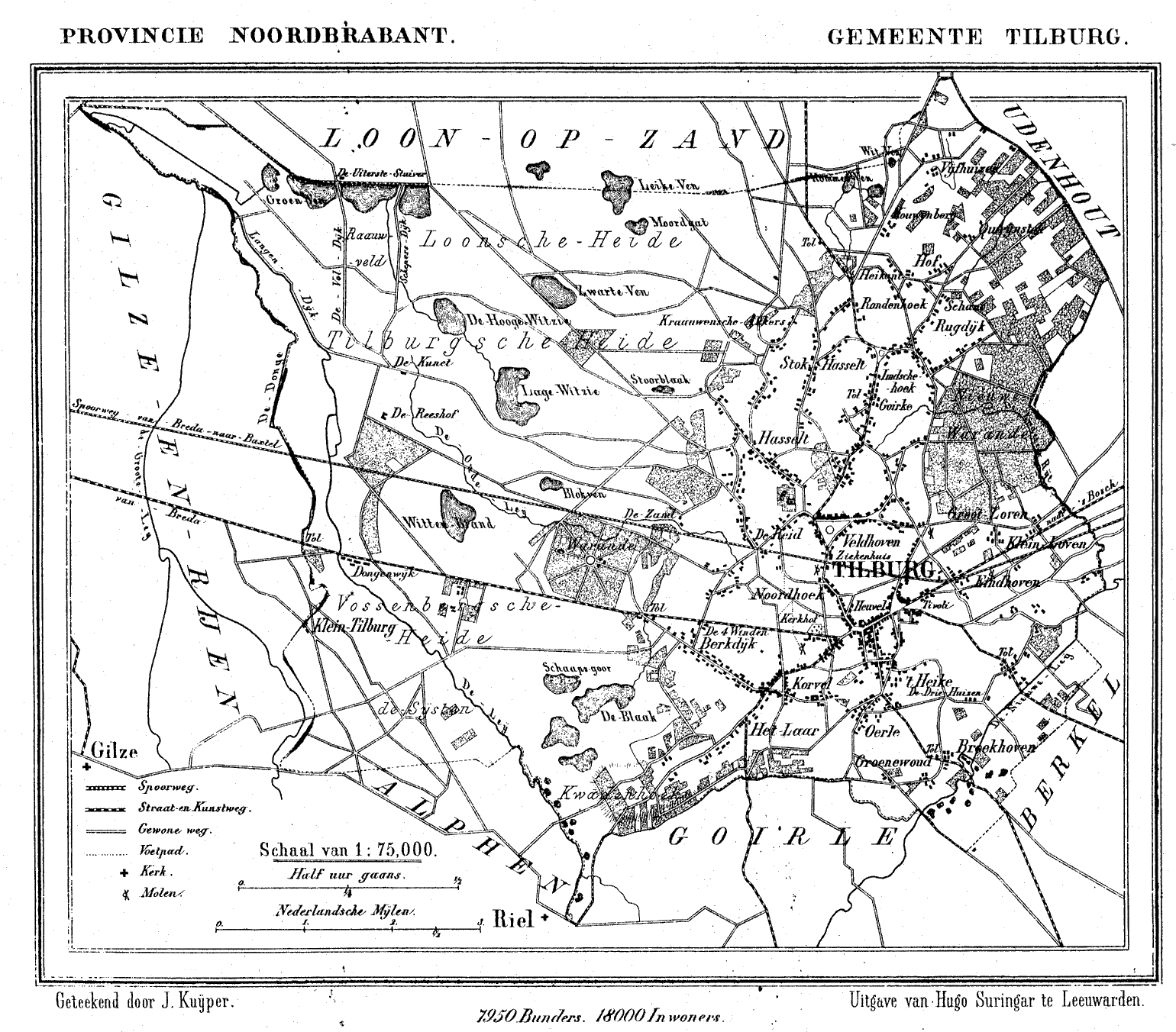
Tilburg municipality in 1865

On 8 December 1909 construction of the first section of the canal was tendered. This stretched from the Donge to the Koningsdijk in Oosterhout, and included dredging the Donge. The lowest bid was by H.G. den Hartog from The Hague for 258,900 guilders. In mid March 1910 the workers were constructing sheds. They would start digging in April. In October 1910 Den Hartog also got the order to construct a quay Los- en Laadplaats, just north of where the Mark Canal was. This is still in use. On 15 May 1912 the section from the Donge to the Koningsdijk and its quay was opened.

The Mark Canal, which connected Breda to the Meuse, came next. In 1911 there was a 310,000 guilders budget for the Mark Canal from Oosterhout to the river Mark. In October 1912 the (since replaced) lock at the eastern end of the Mark Canal, south of the Koningsdijk, was tendered. The government gave the lock at the Mark Canal the dimensions 65 * 15 m, with a passage width of 7.50 m. This was enough for two ships of 60 * 7 * 1.90 m and better than agreed upon with North-Brabant. In October 1913 construction of the Mark Canal itself was tendered for 734,400 guilders. On 4 October 1915 the Mark Canal was opened. Ships of 60 * 7 * 2.10 m were allowed on the canal.

The section from Oosterhout to Dongen faced a particular challenge. It was dug upstream to a place without surface water. The water would therefore have to be pumped upstream. In December 1913 the (since replaced) double lock "Lock I" south of the Koningsdijk was tendered. Construction of Lock I started in April 1914. Later in April 1914, construction of the section between Lock I and the Voldijk, about 5 km east of Dongen was tendered. On 12 March 1917 this section was opened till the quay of Dongen.

World War I would speed up the section from Dongen to Tilburg, because there was a lot of unemployment. In September 1914 the government therefore asked for an extra 500,000 to speed up the Wilhelmina Canal. Shortly after, the government asked 5 contractors to make a bid for digging a section east of the Voldijk by hand. It was rumored that the constructor of the almost complete Mark Canal got the order. On 2 December 1914 Lock II (near the Voldijk) and the double lock Lock III were tendered, together with digging a projected stretch of the canal in Tilburg municipality. The contract was won bij J.P. Broekhoven from Hengelo for 1,038,000 guilders. The tendered section of the canal was probably that which was between the two locks, or the section stretching to the road from Tilburg to Loon op Zand. In late June 1915 D. van der Zee was appointed as extraordinary overseer for construction of the section from Lock III till that road. On 14 February 1919 the section between Dongen and the Tilburg quay at the Lijnschestraat (now IJsselstraat), east of Lock III was opened.

The projected end point of the canal in Tilburg was the Piushaven (Pius Harbor) just south east of the city center. On 24 July 1918 construction of two sections was tendered. The first was that between the Tilburg-Loon op Zand road and the Nieuwe Leij, and included a side canal towards Tilburg proper. The other section stretched to Haghorst. The side canal would lead to Tilburg's inland harbor Piushaven. The plan for a harbor, housing and industry near the Pius park and street was approved in April 1920. It seems that celebrations for the opening of the harbor were included in those for the 25th anniversary of Queen Wilhelmina's reign in August 1923. These included a gondola tour from the Quay at Lijnsheike to Piushaven.

=== East of Tilburg ===
Construction of the section east of Tilburg started in the east, at the Zuid-Willemsvaart, because that is where the water was. On 29 April 1916 Lock V, just west of Lieshout was tendered. On 25 October 1916 the canal section from the Zuid-Willemsvaart till the Breugelsche Beek (just east of Son) was tendered. In June 1917 the section from the Breugelsche Beek till the eastern border of the municipality of Best was tendered. In October 1917, the connecting section from the eastern border of Best till the Heersdijk (just east of Oorschot) was tendered. In December 1917 the connecting section between the Heersdijk and the Beerse Heide (east of Haghorst) was tendered. On 24 July 1918 the section from the Emmerseweg in Haghorst (location of Lock IV) till Nieuwe Leij in Tilburg was tendered together with final section from the Meuse till Tilburg.

On 1 July 1921 the section from the Zuid-Willemsvaart to the quay in Lieshout was opened. On 9 January 1922 the section from Lieshout till the Double-beam drawbridge in the Kwadeweg at the hamlet Stad van Gerwen was opened. On 22 May 1922 the section from this bridge till a like bridge south of Breugel was opened. On 4 April 1923 the last sections of the Wilhelmina Canal were opened.

== The canal in 1925 ==
In 1925 the canal started at the Donge in Statendam, 5 km from the Donge's confluence with the Amer. Stretching along Oosterhout and Tilburg it reached the Zuid-Willemsvaart 4 km north of Helmond. Locks I to V divided it in six pounds or levels.

The lowest pound was in open connection with the sea and tides. Its level varied from 1.14 m above Amsterdam Ordnance Datum (AOD) till 0.37 m below at ebb. In Oosterhout, Lock I was a staircase lock gekoppelde Schutsluis, basically two locks in line, which allowed to bridge the rise to the +5 m AOD level of the next pound. In Tilburg, Lock II was a regular lock that lifted to +7.5 m AOD. About four kilometers to the east came the staircase lock Lock III, which lifted to +12.5 m AOD. East of Tilburg was Lock IV in Haghorst, which lifted to +14.76 m AOD. Lock V only closed in exceptional circumstances.

The passage width of the locks was 7.5 m, and they were 65 m long. The canal was 25 m wide at the surface. For the lowest pound this was 30 m. At the bottom width was 15 m and 16 m. Depth was 2.30 m below canal level. For the tidal pound, this was -3 m AOD. It meant that the canal was suitable for 500 tons ships, the lowest pound for 700 tons ships.

The entire Wilhelmina Canal was opened for shipping on 4 April 1923. The cost had risen from an estimated 7.5 million guilders to 24 million on completion.

== Usage ==
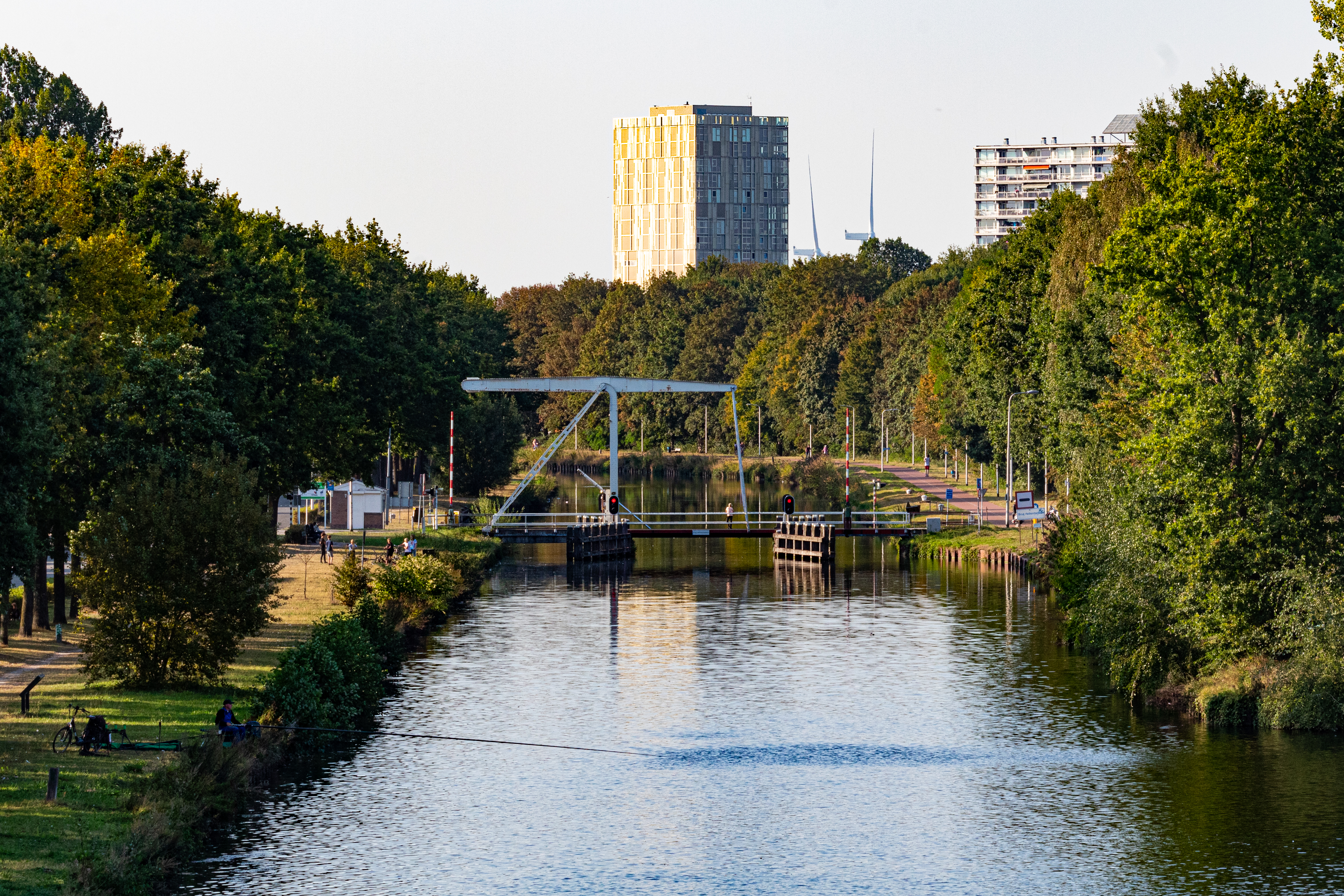
The canal in Tilburg

The opening of the canal did not lead to a boom in shipping. Overall, the canal did not lead to the expected benefits. By 1925 the Wilhelmina Canal and Mark Canal both had about 10,000 ships of about 1,000,000 tons capacity passing their locks at Oosterhout. About 7,000 ships of 825,000 tons passed Lock III, and probably continued to Tilburg. At Lock V only 2,400 ships of 306,000 tons passed. This could be compared to the traffic at Sluis 0 and Lock 13 at the Zuid-Willemsvaart. Sluis 0 had 21,000 ships of 4,000,000 tons and Lock 13 12,250 ships of 3,300,000 tons.

In time business on the Wilhelmina Canal increased. In 1929 almost 2,000,000 tons passed Lock I. Passage at Lock V increased to about 1,000,000 tons, compared to a slight decrease at Lock 13. In 1936 1,162,000 tons passed Lock I, and 545,000 passed lock V, compared to 2,406,00 tons at Sluis 0 and 2,169,000 tons at lock 13.

In 1960 the harbor master of Tilburg put passage on the Wilhelmina Canal at 10,000 ships and over 2,000,000 tons. He thought that the maximum draft for ships on the canal should be increased to 2.20 or 2.30 m. Ships of 600 tons could then make better use of their capacity. He thought that there was nothing to indicate that an upgrade to accommodate ships of 1,500 tons was necessary. In 1963 1,930,000 tons passed Lock I, 1,387,000 tons passed Lock IV, and 2.286,000 tons passed lock V, compared to 3,211,000 tons at Sluis 0 and 4,827,000 tons at lock 13. That year both canals had been blocked by ice for about 70 days.

Data from 1963 shows that most ships mainly transported bulk cargo on the canal. That year, 3,394 ships offloaded 605,033 tons in Tilburg. Of this, sand amounted to 238,518 ton, gravel amounted to 146,158. Other goods were ammunition, lime, gasoline, timber, fodder, fuel oil. tarmacadam, trees, brick, fertilizer, etc. Only 74 ships loaded goods in Tilburg.

=== Small improvements (1960-1993) ===
In 1962 a plan was made to replace Lock I and the eastern lock of the Mark Canal, and to upgrade the canal from there till the Amer for ships of more than 1,000 tons. The new lock that replaced the old Lock I was built west of it, on a new section of the canal, just west of where the eastern lock of the Mark Canal used to be. A replacement for the old lock at the end of the Mark Canal was built about 500 m to the northwest. In Spring 1977 these works were officially opened for shipping. After these improvements, the Amertak was opened in 1993. It runs from Statendam to the Amer, and replaced the Donge route.

=== Decay ===
By 1986 the Zuid-Willemsvaart and Wilhelmina Canal south of Oosterhout were in bad shape. The province noted that only ships of up to 600 tons could use the canals, and these could only be loaded to half capacity. The province therefore urged that these canals would be upgraded for ships of 1,350 tons.

== Future ==
In November 2007 the Ministry of Transport and Water Management, North Brabant province and Tilburg municipality signed an agreement. The objective was to make the canal up to Tilburg suitable for ships of CEMT class IV.

In order to achieve the objective, the canal level would be raised, Lock II would be demolished, and a new Lock would be built next to Lock III, because Lock III is a listed construction as a lock stair and bayonet lock. East of the new Lock III, a facility would be built where ships of Class IV could turnabout. The economy of scale would make water transport cheaper, travel time on the canal would decrease by 30 minutes, and the ultimate goal was to remove trucks from the roads.

Work started in 2013, and was expected to be finished in 2016. Sluis III was built according to plan, and was finished by 2017.

A major problem was then discovered: the lower water level on the higher side of the canal pound would most probably lead a much lower groundwater level in the Tilburg district Reeshof. Houses could then start to sag. In December 2017 the governments then decided to rebuild Lock II instead of simply demolishing it. It was a blunder of about 70 million euros. An investigation of how the blunder could have happened was started.

To make matters worse, construction of the new Lock II was prohibited due to the nitrogen crisis. On 20 April 2022, construction of the new Lock II was postponed until further notice.

== Recreation ==
The Wilhelmina Canal was very important for the development of water sports in Tilburg. In April 1925 the new Tilburgse Watersportvereniging Wilhelmina opened her Pavilion at the Piushaven, and made a small demonstration with some rowing boats. In August 1925 there was a 1,500 m swimming event finishing at the harbor, and a water polo match. Rowing matches soon followed. The canal was also important for long distance skating in the area.

Speelland Beekse Bergen and Safaripark Beekse Bergen were created in the 1960s. Their origin lies in the sand extraction in the area. The little lake at the center of the recreational area is in direct connection to the Wilhelmina Canal. Just north of the Beekse Bergen, a section of the canal was widened to create the Watersportbaan Tilburg. This is the second Dutch especially created water for rowing regattas.

By 1982 only a couple of ships a week entered the Piushaven in Tilburg. This started a discussion about using the harbor as a marina. The Piushaven is now indeed a marina, with a limited number of places for historic vessels.
