= Amercentrale =

Coal-fired power plant in Geertruidenberg, Netherlands

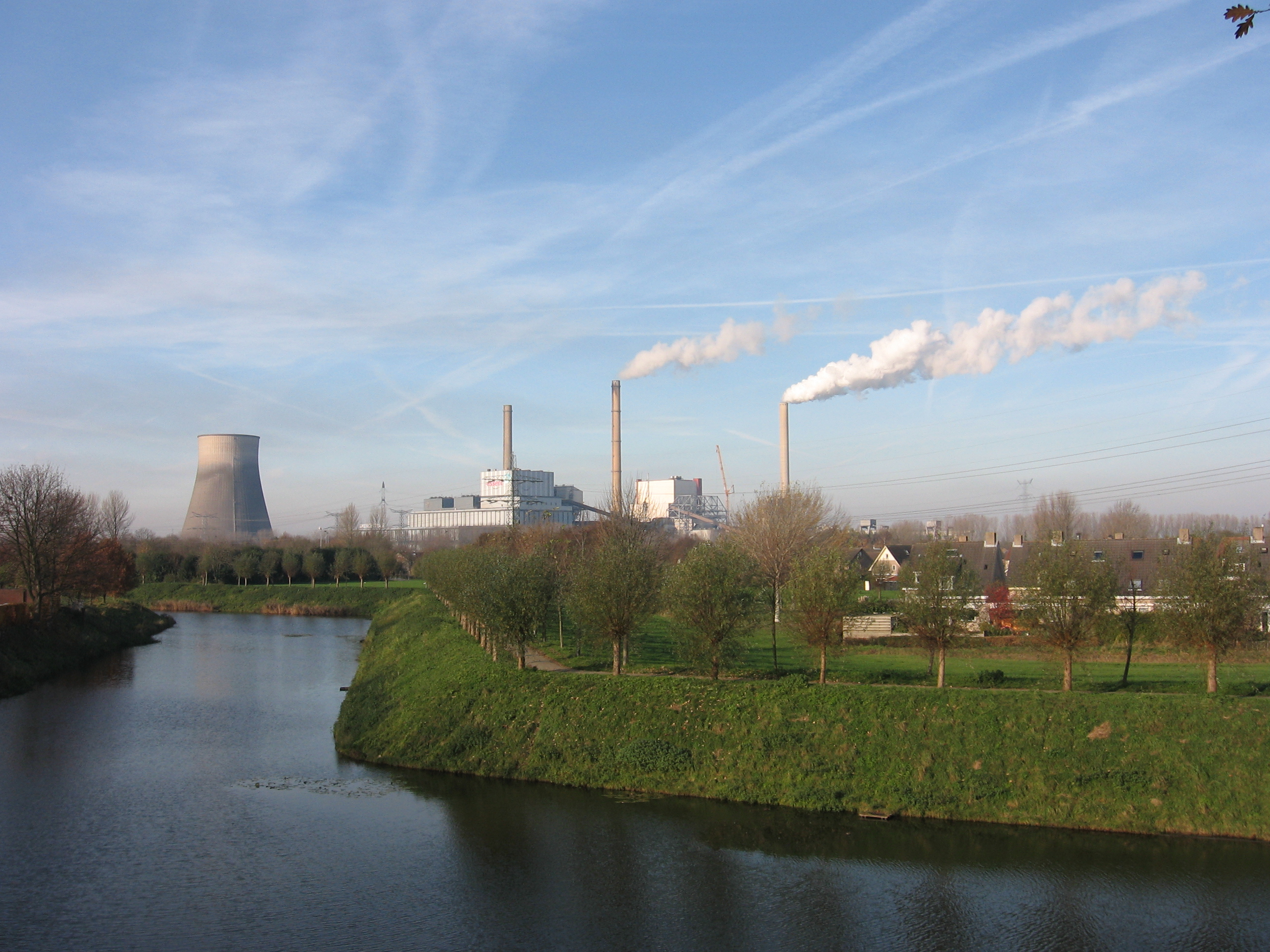
- view from Geertruidenberg
- Country: Netherlands
- Location: Geertruidenberg
- Coordinates: 51°42′34″N 4°50′36″E
- Status: Operational
- Commission date: 1952
- Owner: RWE

Thermal power station
- Primary fuel: Biomass

Power generation
- Nameplate capacity: 600 MW

External links
- Commons: Related media on Commons

The Amercentrale is a biomass-fired power plant of RWE in the municipality Geertruidenberg. The plant is named after the Amer River and is located on the left bank of this river. In 1952 Unit 1 of the first Amercentrale began generating electricity. The much smaller Dongecentrale, decommissioned in 2011, is located near the Amercentrale.

== Technical specifications ==
The power plant generates 600 MW of power as well as heat for heating homes and greenhouses. The plant provides a large part of southern Netherlands with electric power and also supplies heat to the horticultural areas. Since unit 8 was decommissioned in 2015, only unit 9, which has been in operation since 1993, is still in use. Plans to build a new coal and biomass-fired unit of about 800 MW have been scrapped. Unit 9 could be closed in the near future in a bid to achieve climate goals, if another solution can be found for the district heating in the nearby towns of Breda and Tilburg.
