= Beatrix Canal =

Waterway in Eindhoven, Netherlands

Coordinates: 51.4552°N 5.4054°E

- Interactive map of Beatrix Canal

Specifications
- Maximum height above sea level: 49 ft (15 m)
- Status: Open

History
- Construction began: 1930
- Date of first use: 1940
- Date completed: 1939

Geography
- Start point: Wilhelmina Canal near Best, Netherlands
- End point: Eindhoven, Netherlands
- Branch: Discharge Canal
- Branch of: Wilhelmina Canal

The Beatrix Canal (Dutch: Beatrixkanaal) is an 8.4 km long canal in the southern Netherlands. It was constructed to provide the city of Eindhoven with access to the Wilhelmina Canal.

In order to be able to regulate the level of the Gender and Dommel streams, which regularly threatened to flood Eindhoven's inner city, an additional Discharge Canal (Afwateringskanaal), which is not open to navigation, was dug to connect the Beatrix Canal and the Dommel stream. Into this branch, the Gender now discharges.

Upon completion, the canal was named in honour of the newborn eldest daughter of the heir presumptive to the Dutch throne, Princess Beatrix.
