= Amer (river) =

River in the Netherlands

Coordinates: 51°43′23″N 4°45′39″E

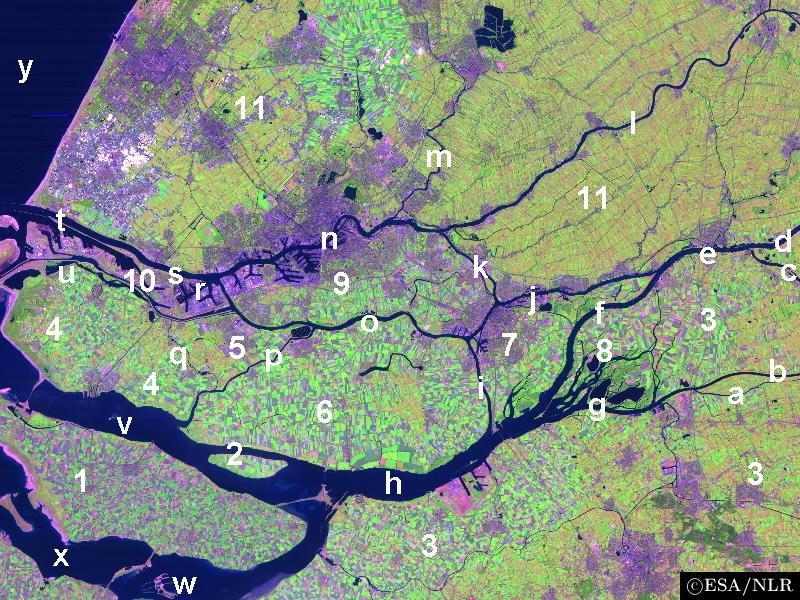
Satellite image of the Rhine–Meuse delta, showing the Amer (g)

The Amer is a river in the Dutch province of North Brabant. It is a continuation of the Bergse Maas river from the river Donge near Raamsdonksveer to the point where it joins the river Nieuwe Merwede to form the Hollands Diep estuary, and has a total length of approximately 20 kilometres (12 mi). The Amer is a major navigation route. It forms the south boundary of the Biesbosch National Park.

In 1886, the splitting of the Maas and of the Waal made the Amer the mouth of the Maas. Before anthropogenic actions in the early 1900s, salmon used to reach the Bergse Maas through the Amer.

The river is also known because the Amercentrale, one of the biggest power plants in the Netherlands, is located on its bank. As a result, ships transporting coal for the plant use the eastern part of the river, mainly coming from the Wilhelmina Canal.

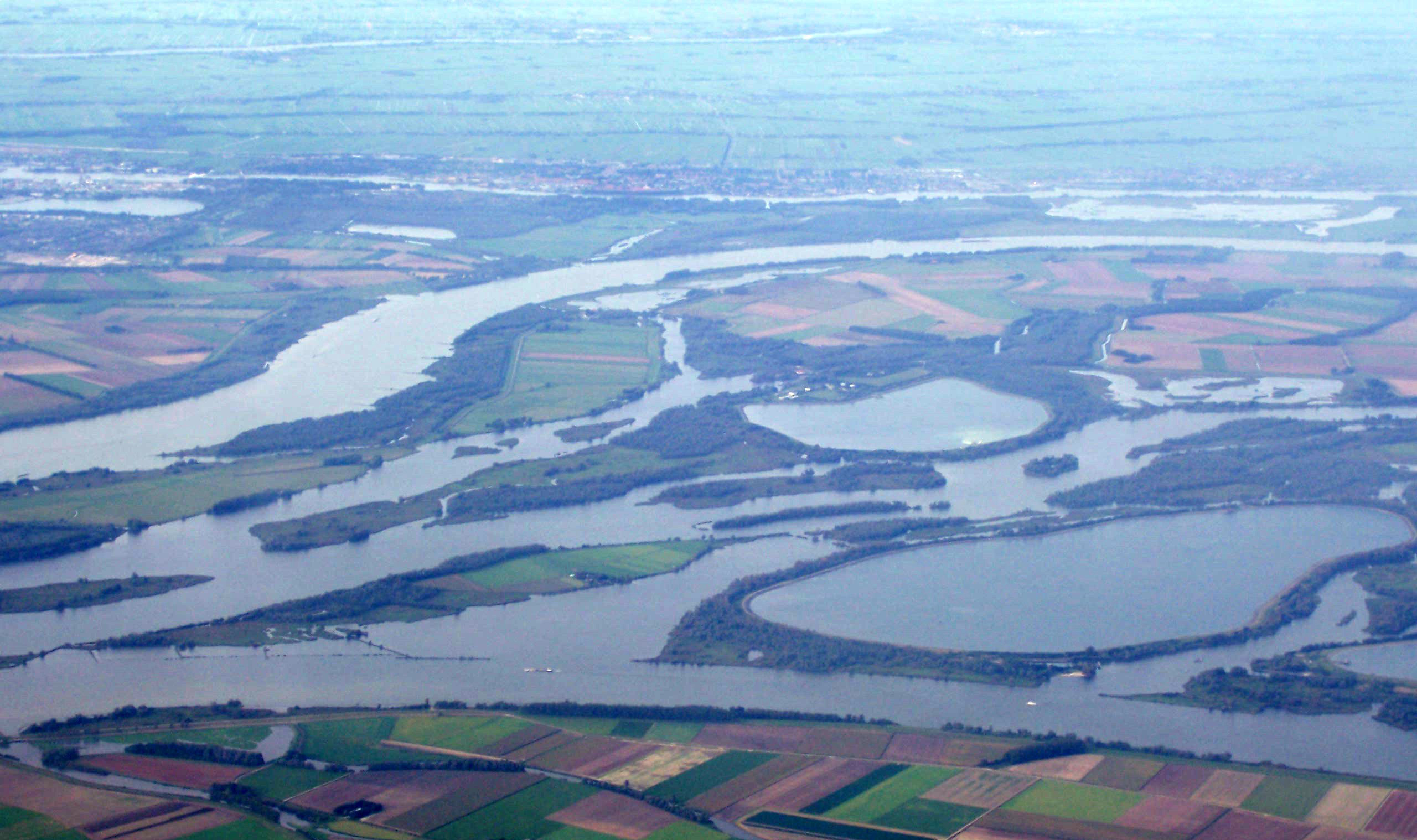
Amer in foreground
