= Geertruidenberg =

- City and Municipality
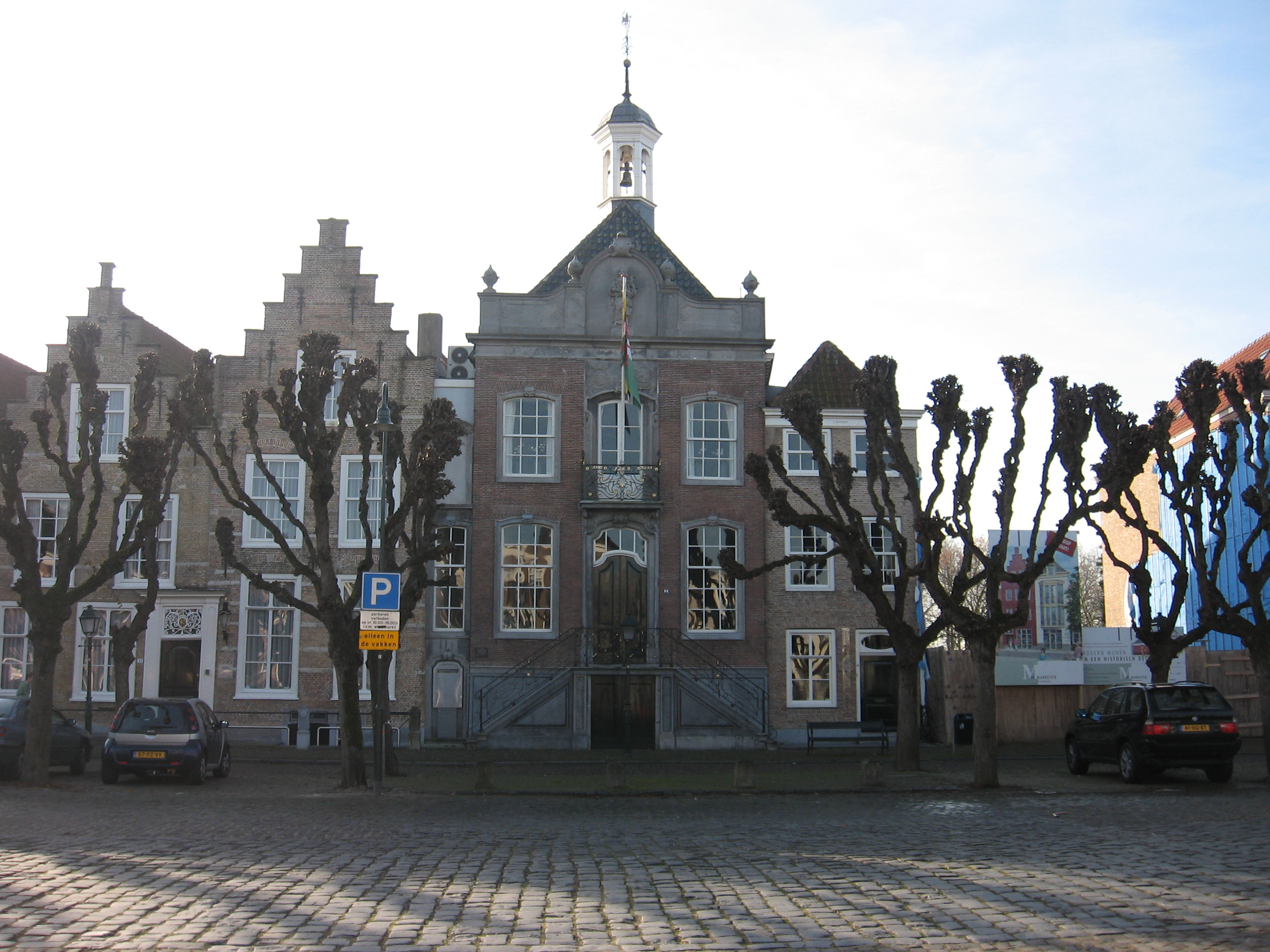
- Former city hall on market square

- Flag Coat of arms

- Location in North Brabant
- Coordinates: 51°42′00″N 04°51′31″E
- Country: Netherlands
- Province: North Brabant

Government
  - Body: Municipal council
  - Mayor: Marian Witte (SGP)

Area
  - Municipality: 29.64 km^{2} (11.44 sq mi)
  - Land: 26.63 km^{2} (10.28 sq mi)
  - Water: 3.01 km^{2} (1.16 sq mi)
- Elevation: 3 m (9.8 ft)

Population (January 2021)
  - Municipality: 21,770
  - Density: 817/km^{2} (2,120/sq mi)
- Time zone: UTC+1 (CET)
  - Summer (DST): UTC+2 (CEST)
- Postcode: 4930–4944
- Area code: 0162
- Website: www.geertruidenberg.nl

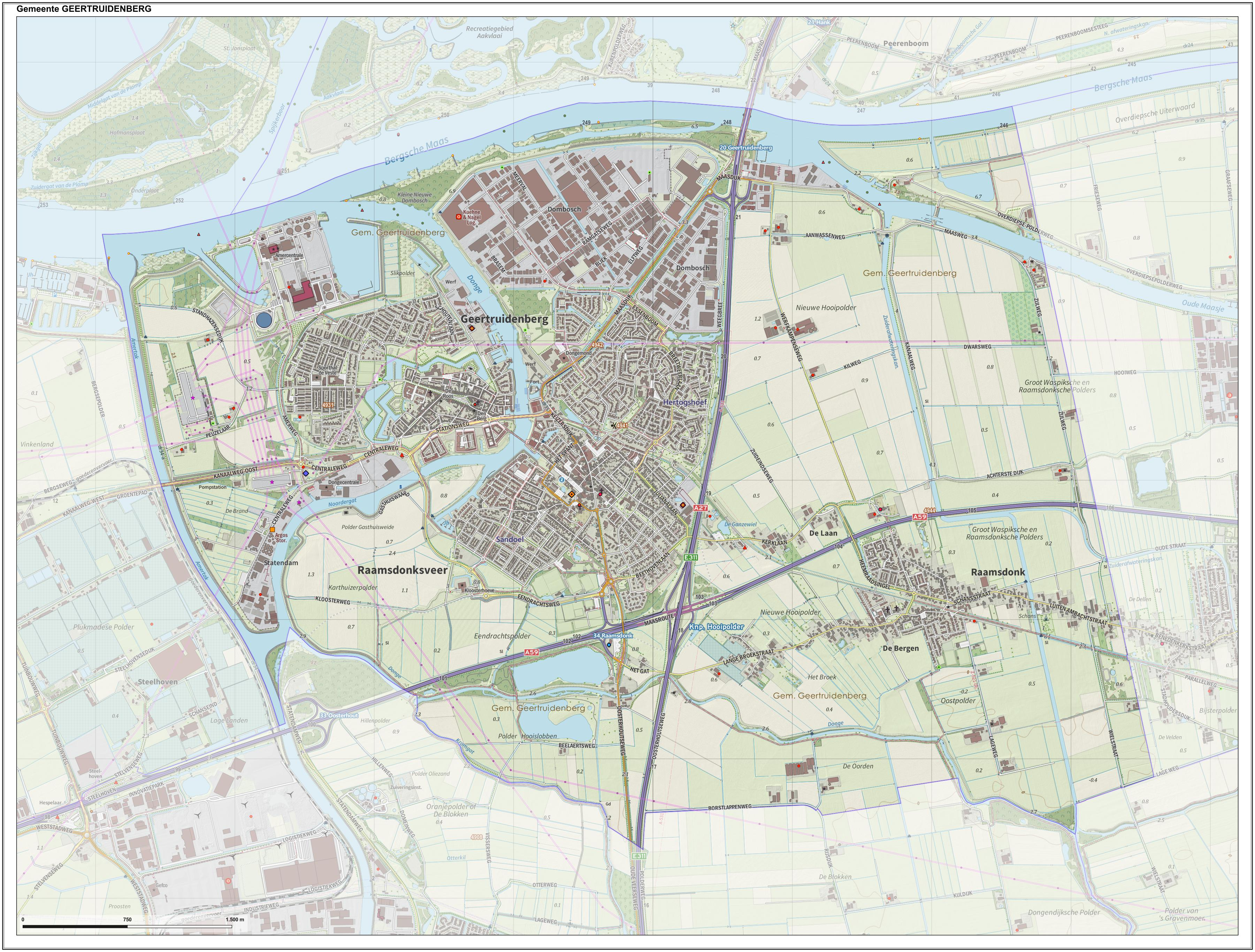
Map of the municipality of Geertruidenberg, June 2015

Geertruidenberg (Dutch pronunciation: [ˈɣeːrtrœydə(m)ˌbɛr(ə)x]) is a city and municipality in the province North Brabant in the south of the Netherlands. The city, named after Saint Gertrude of Nivelles, received city rights in 1213 from the count of Holland. The fortified city prospered until the 15th century.

Today, the municipality of Geertruidenberg includes the population centres of Raamsdonk and Raamsdonksveer. The municipality has a total area of 29.64 km^{2} (11.44 sq mi) and had a population of 21,770 in 2021. The city government consists of the mayor and three aldermen.

== History ==
Geertruidenberg is named after Saint Gertrude of Nivelles.

In 1213, Sint Geertruidenberg (English: "Saint Gertrude's Mountain") received city rights from Count William I of Holland. The fortified city became a trade center, where counts and other nobility gathered for negotiations. In 1323–1325, Geertruidenberg Castle was constructed very close to the city center.

During the Hook and Cod wars, the city chose the Cod side in 1351, while the castle remained on the Hook side. This led to the 1350–1351 Siege of Geertruidenberg. In 1420 a similar siege during a later Hook and Cod war caused huge damage to the city. The Saint Elizabeth's flood of 1421 then ended the prosperity of Geertruidenberg.

In 1573, during the Eighty Years War, the city was captured in a surprise attack by an English, French Huguenot and Fleming force. In 1589 however the city was betrayed to Parma by its English garrison. It was finally recaptured by an Anglo-Dutch force under the command of Maurice of Nassau in the summer of 1593.

Today, Geertruidenberg is part of the province of North Brabant, but it was once part of the county of Holland. Geertruidenberg is the second oldest city of Holland as it was the first to receive city rights. It is a common misconception that Geertruidenberg is the oldest city of the Netherlands, because the names Holland and the Netherlands are used interchangeably by some.

== Geography ==
The total area of the municipality is 29.64 km^{2} (11.44 sq mi), of which 26.63 km^{2} (10.28 sq mi) is land and 3.01 km^{2} (1.16 sq mi) is water.

The municipality of Geertruidenberg comprises three population centres:

- Geertruidenberg
- Raamsdonk
- Raamsdonksveer

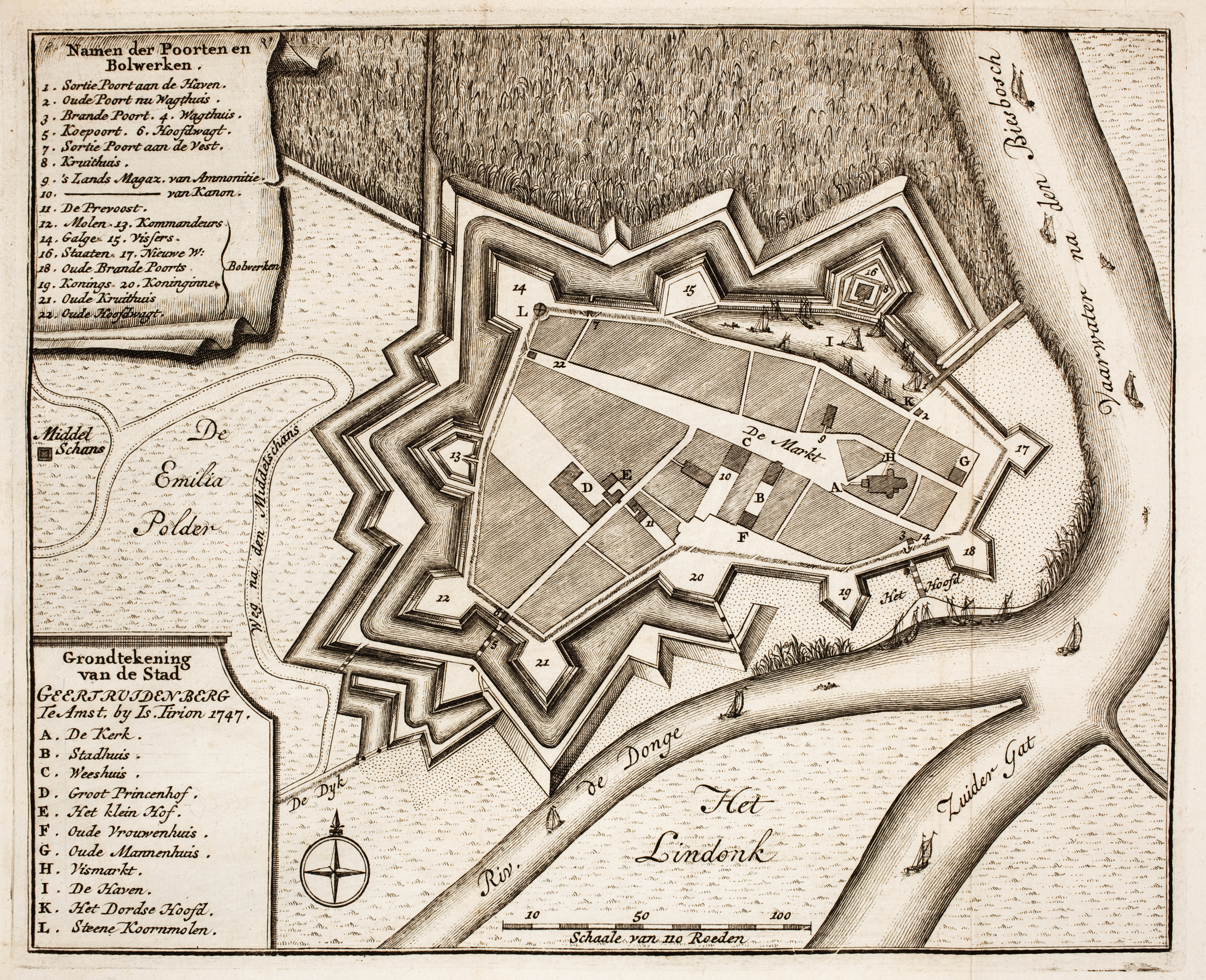
Map of Geertruidenberg, Tirion 1747, 1749

Geertruidenberg is located on the bank of the Donge, close to where this river flows into the Amer.

== Demography ==
As of 2021, the total population of Geertruidenberg was 21,770. The population density was 817/km^{2} (2,120/sq mi).

== Government ==
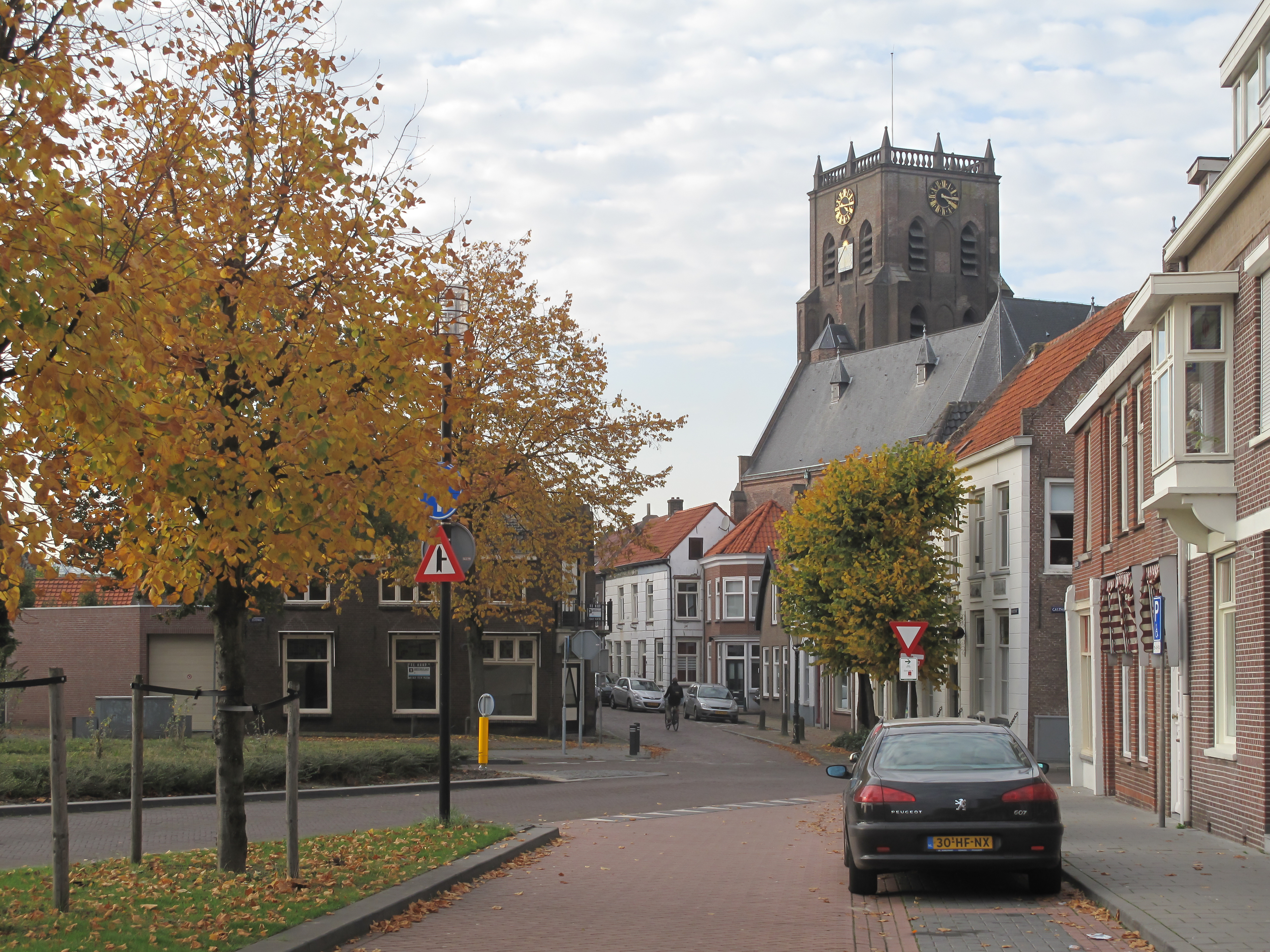
Geertruidenberg, church tower

The mayor of Geertruidenberg is Marian Witte who, like all mayors in the Netherlands, was appointed by the Dutch monarch. She is supported by four aldermen who, with the mayor, form the College van Burgemeester en Wethouders.

The city council is elected every four years, at the same time as most other Dutch municipalities. The 19 members of the city council assemble ten times per year for public meetings in the city hall in Raamsdonksveer. The council members come from seven political parties, four local and three national (2026):

- Municipal Interest Geertruidenberg (6 seats)
- Lokaal+ (4 seats)
- Keerpunt 74 (3 seats)
- VVD (2 seats)
- Morgen! (GroenLinks/P.v.d.A) (2 seats)
- CDA (1 seat)
- Social People's Party Geertruidenberg (1 seat)

== Notable people ==
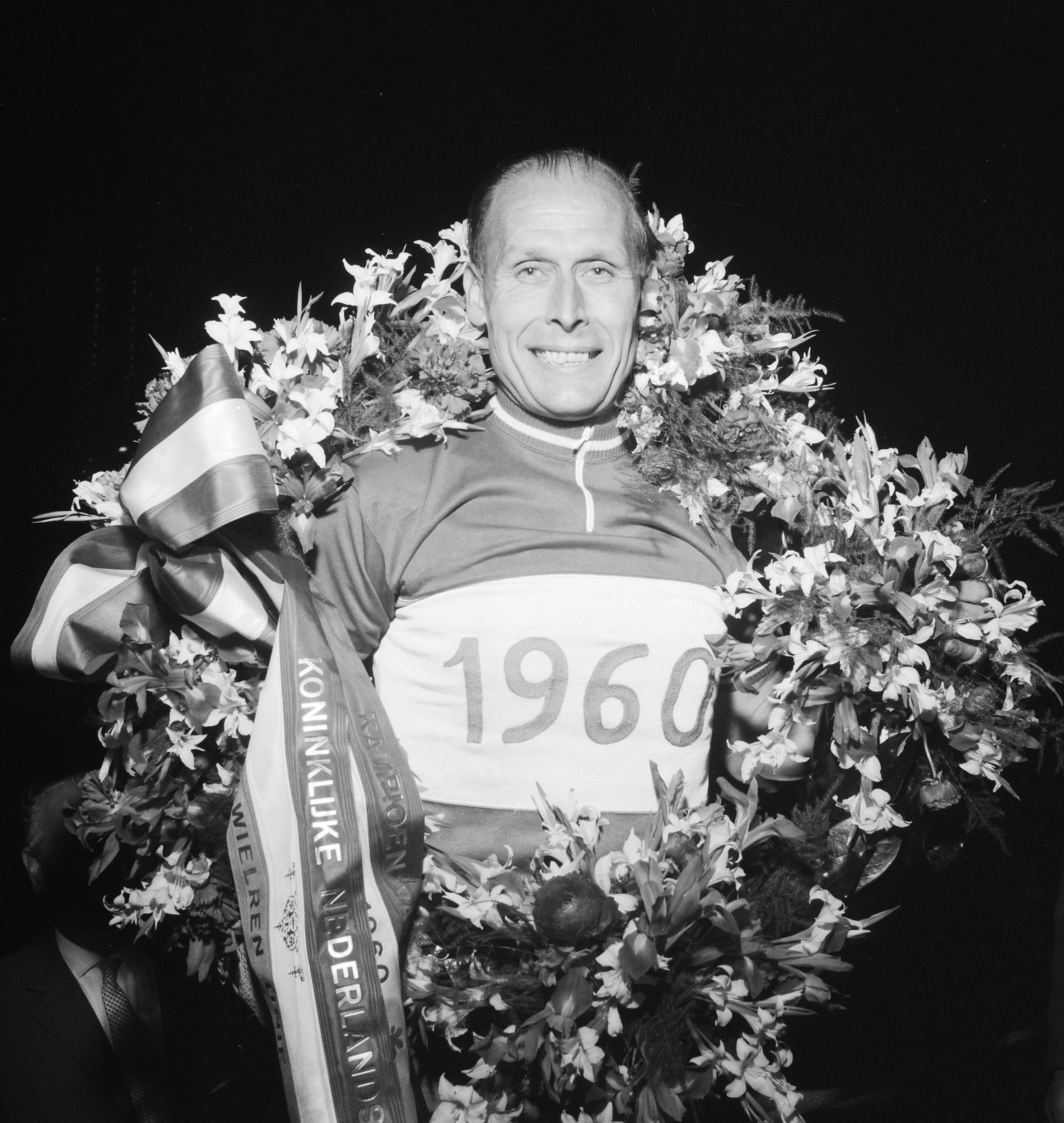
Jan Derksen, 1960

- Johannes Vollevens (1649 in Geertruidenberg – 1728) a Dutch Golden Age painter
- Juliana de Lannoy (1738 – 1782 in St. Geertruidenberg) an artist and poet, lived in St. Geertruidenberg from 1758
- Willem Sassen (1918 in Geertruidenberg – 2002) a Dutch collaborator, Nazi journalist, a member of the Waffen-SS and the interviewer of Adolf Eichmann in 1960
- Jan Derksen (1919 in Geertruidenberg – 2011) a Dutch professional cyclist, world professional track sprint champion in 1946 and 1957
- Matthijs Brouwer (born 1980 in Raamsdonk) a field hockey player, team silver medallist at the 2004 Summer Olympics

== Gallery ==
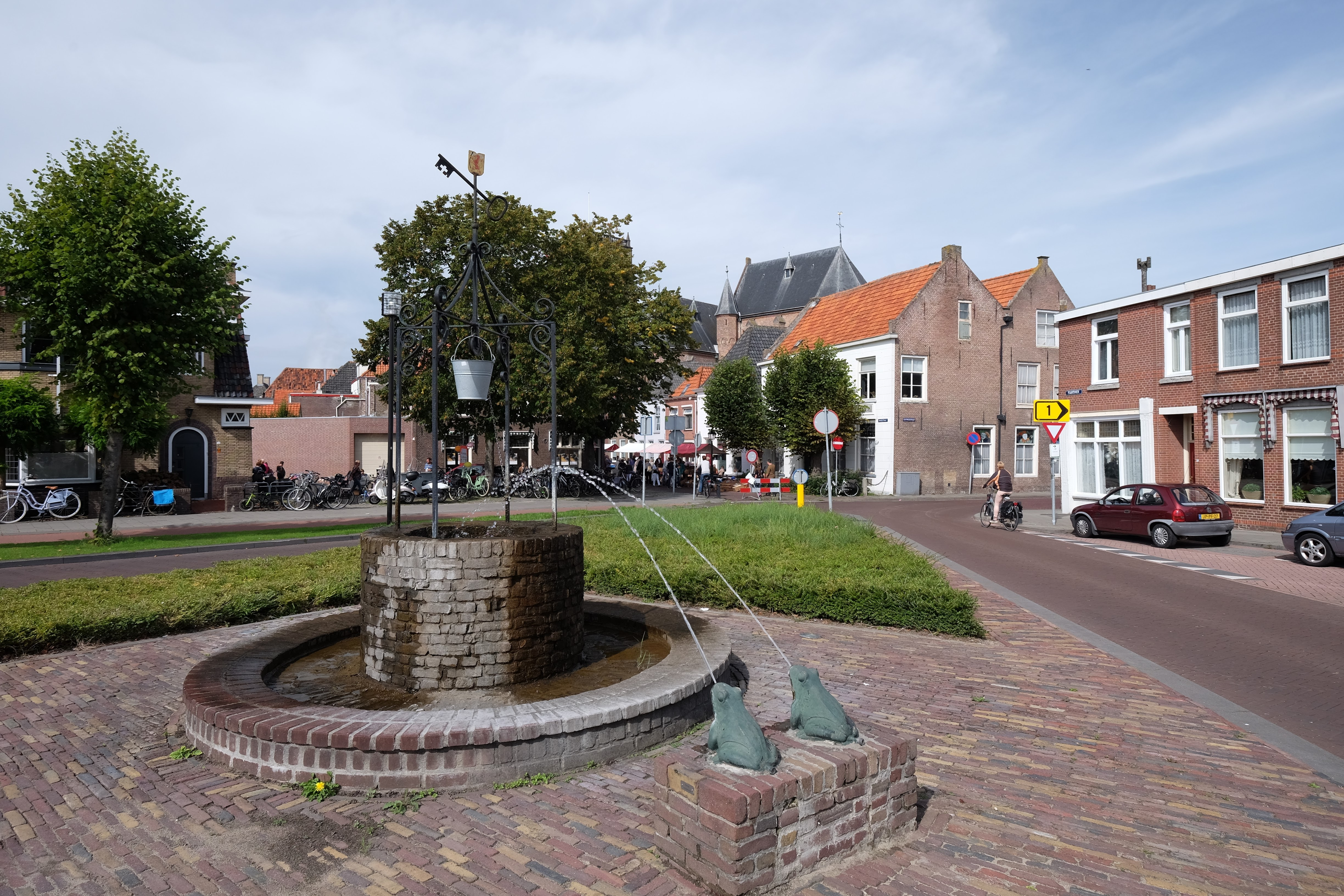
Geertruidenberg

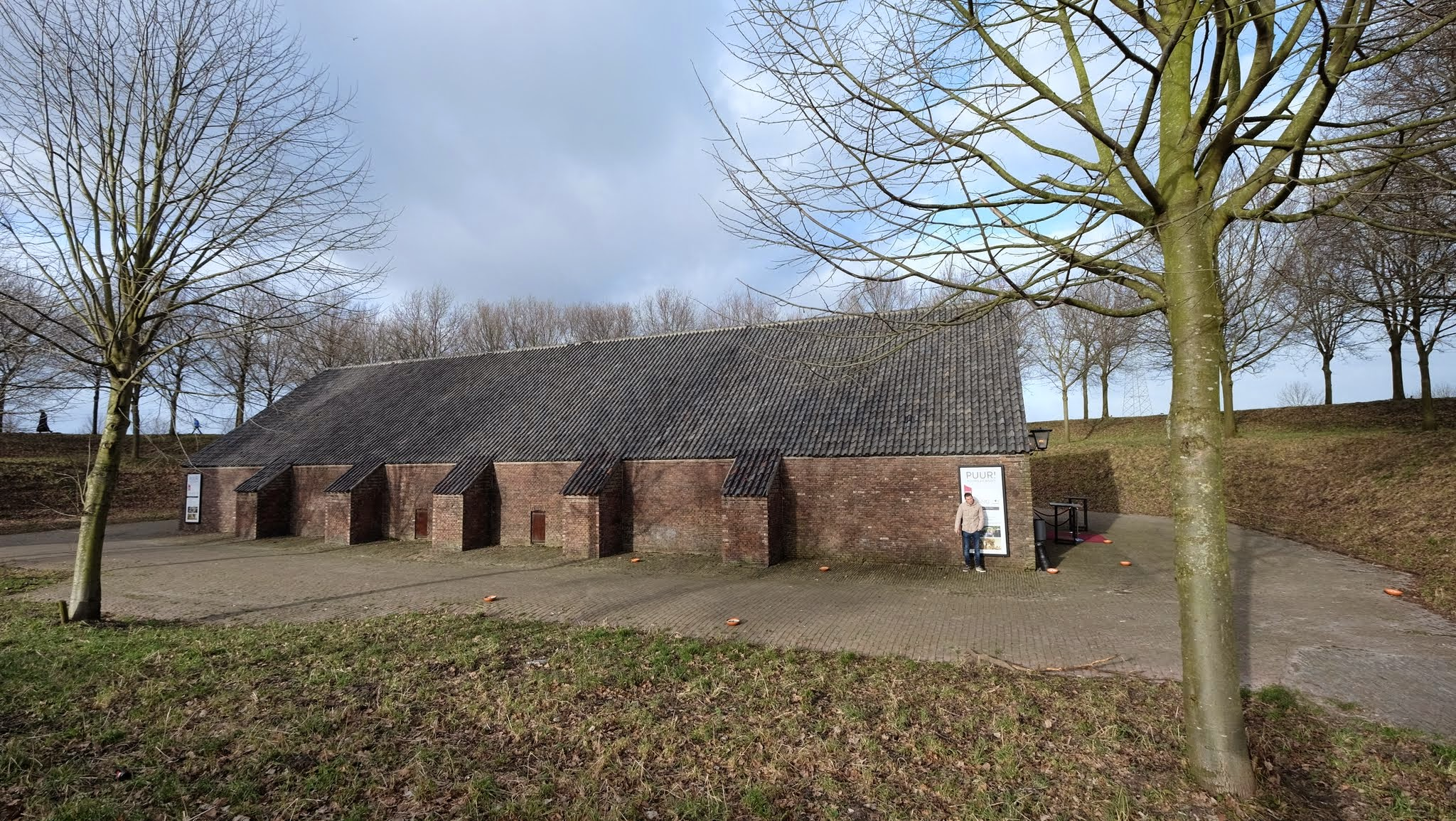
Geertruidenberg

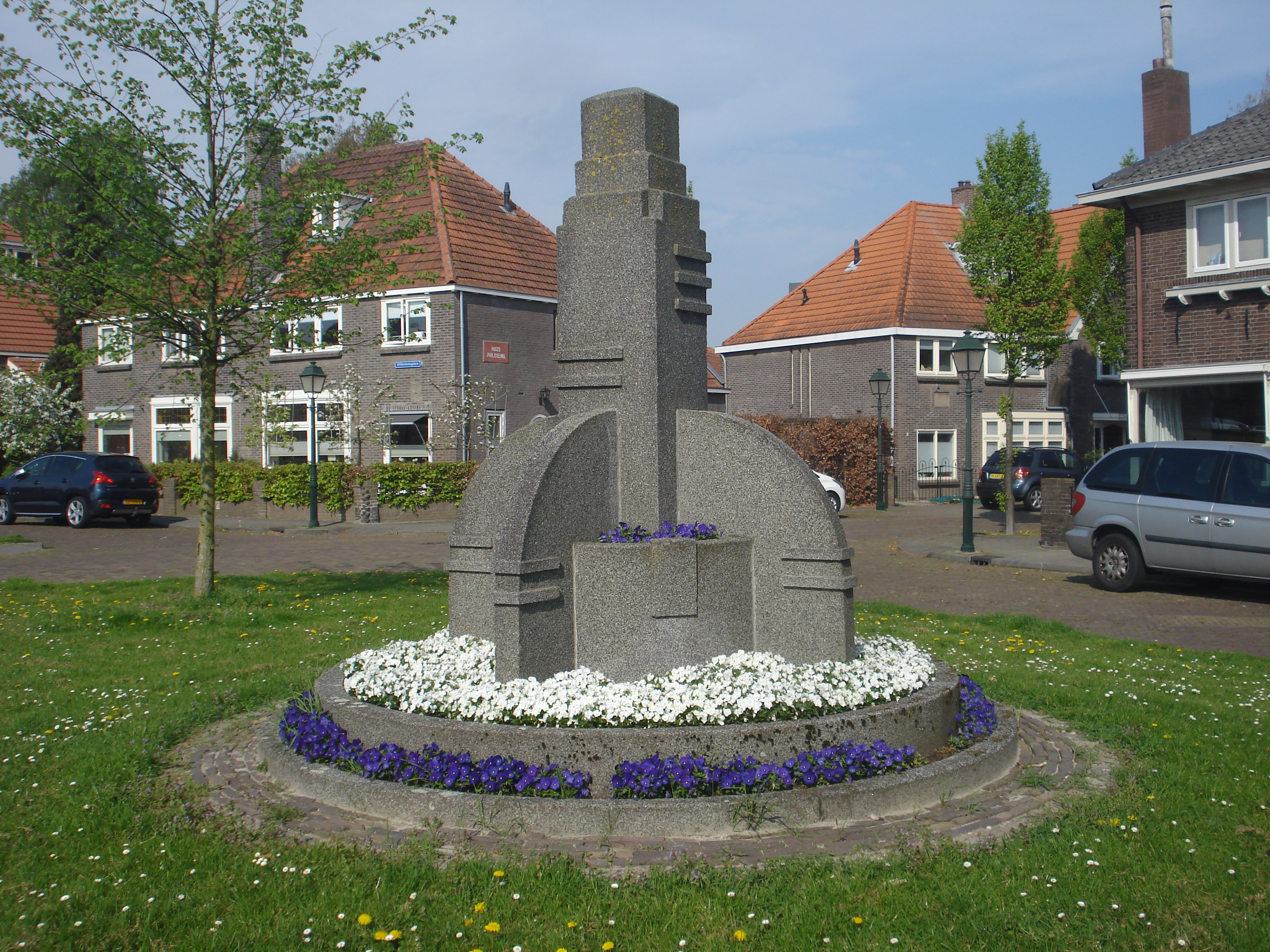
Geertruidenberg flower sculpture

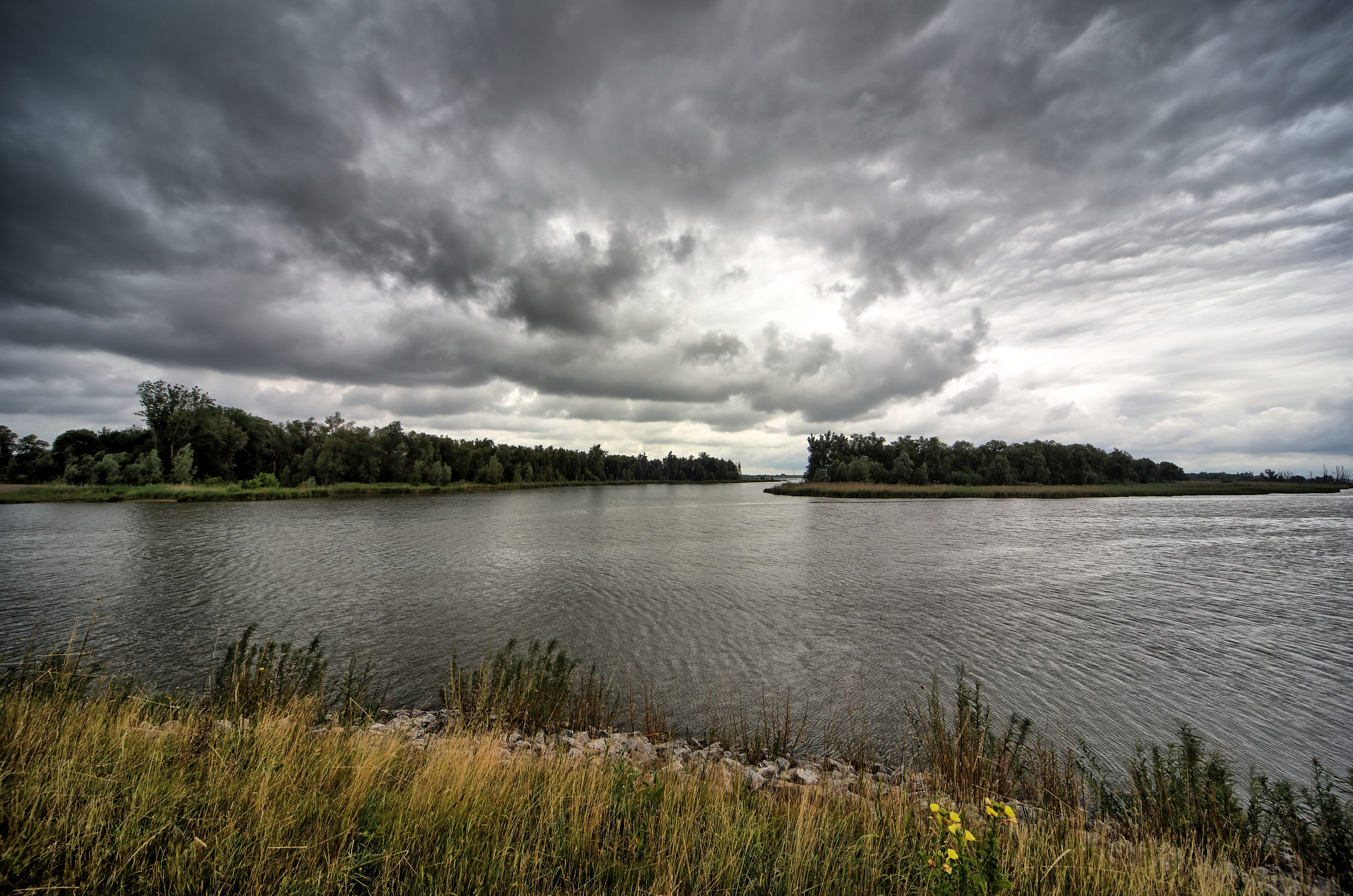
Dordrecht Brabantse Biesbosch
