= Isaak Tirion =

Publisher from the Northern Netherlands

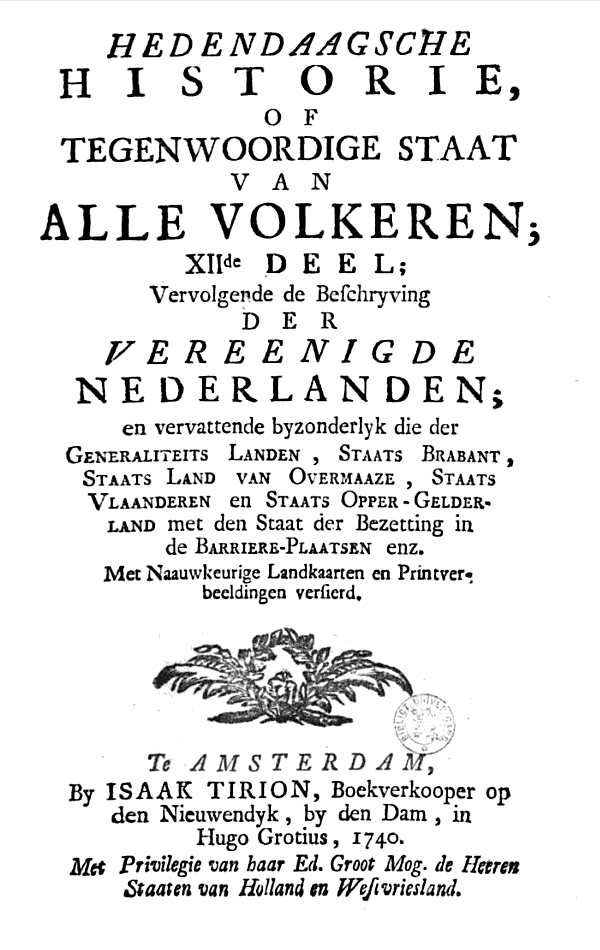
One of many title pages for his magnum opus Hedendaagsche historie

Isaak Tirion (1705 in Utrecht – 1765 in Amsterdam) was an 18th-century publisher from the Dutch Republic.

== Biography ==
According to the RKD, he is most remembered for his Hedendaagsche historie (Modern History) and his Vaderlandse Historie, both historical reference works that were illustrated with engravings by leading artists of Amsterdam.
