= Raamsdonk =

- Village
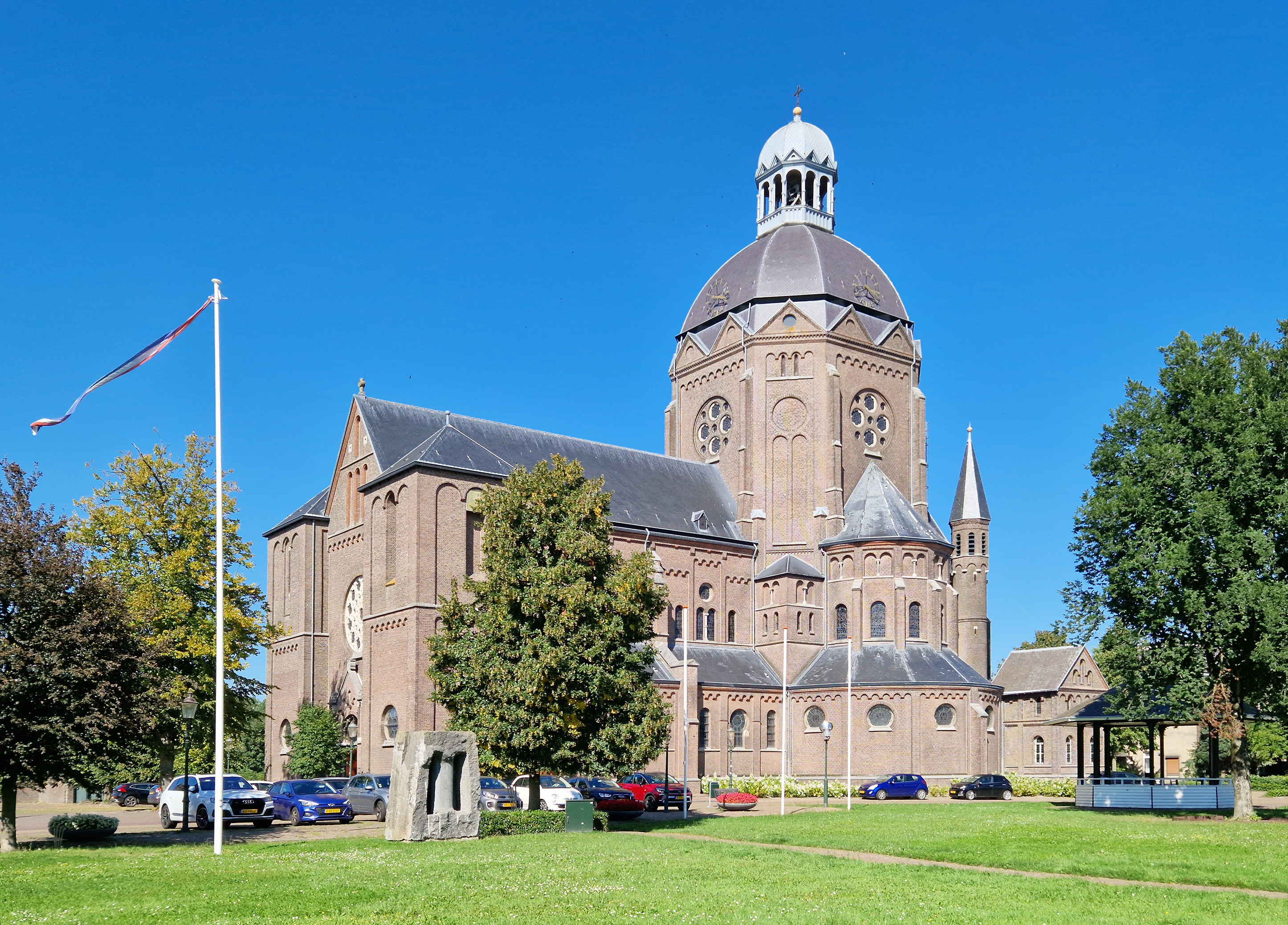
- Catholic church Saint-Bavo

- Flag Coat of arms

- Location in the province of North Brabant in the Netherlands Raamsdonk (Netherlands)
- Coordinates: 51°41′16″N 4°54′29″E
- Country: Netherlands
- Province: North Brabant
- Municipality: Geertruidenberg

Area
  - Total: 13.70 km^{2} (5.29 sq mi)
- Elevation: 2.4 m (7.9 ft)

Population (2021)
  - Total: 2,255
  - Density: 164.6/km^{2} (426.3/sq mi)
- Time zone: UTC+1 (CET)
  - Summer (DST): UTC+2 (CEST)
- Postal code: 4944
- Dialing code: 0162

Raamsdonk is a village in the province of North Brabant, Netherlands. It is located in the municipality of Geertruidenberg, about 15 km northeast of Breda.

== Toponymy ==
Raamsdonk (as "Dunc") is mentioned for the first time in 1253 as Ramesdunc and 1330 as Raemsdonc. A "dunc" or "dark" is a sand hill in a marshy area. The " Raams " prefix may indicate the presence of a certain type of plant, the wild garlic. However, it may also be the name of a person.

== History ==
In 1609, the St. Lambert church became part of the Reformed Church. In 1611, the first pastor came.

The Catholic people were allowed, in 1690, to establish a church in a barn. In the hamlet Waspikse the Benedenkerk. In 1787, another church in a barn was installed in Raamsdonk. This church was dedicated to Saint-Bavo and was in Bergenstraat. In 1798, however, Catholics demanded to return to the St. Lambert church. They did not succeed but received a sum of money in compensation. The barn church served the community until 1888. Then a new monumental St. Bavo Church, was built according to the plans of the architect Carl Weber. It is located in the present village.

At Raamsdonk until about 1850 existed a small French community.

Raamsdonk was a separate municipality until 1997, when it became part of Geertruidenberg.

== Gallery ==
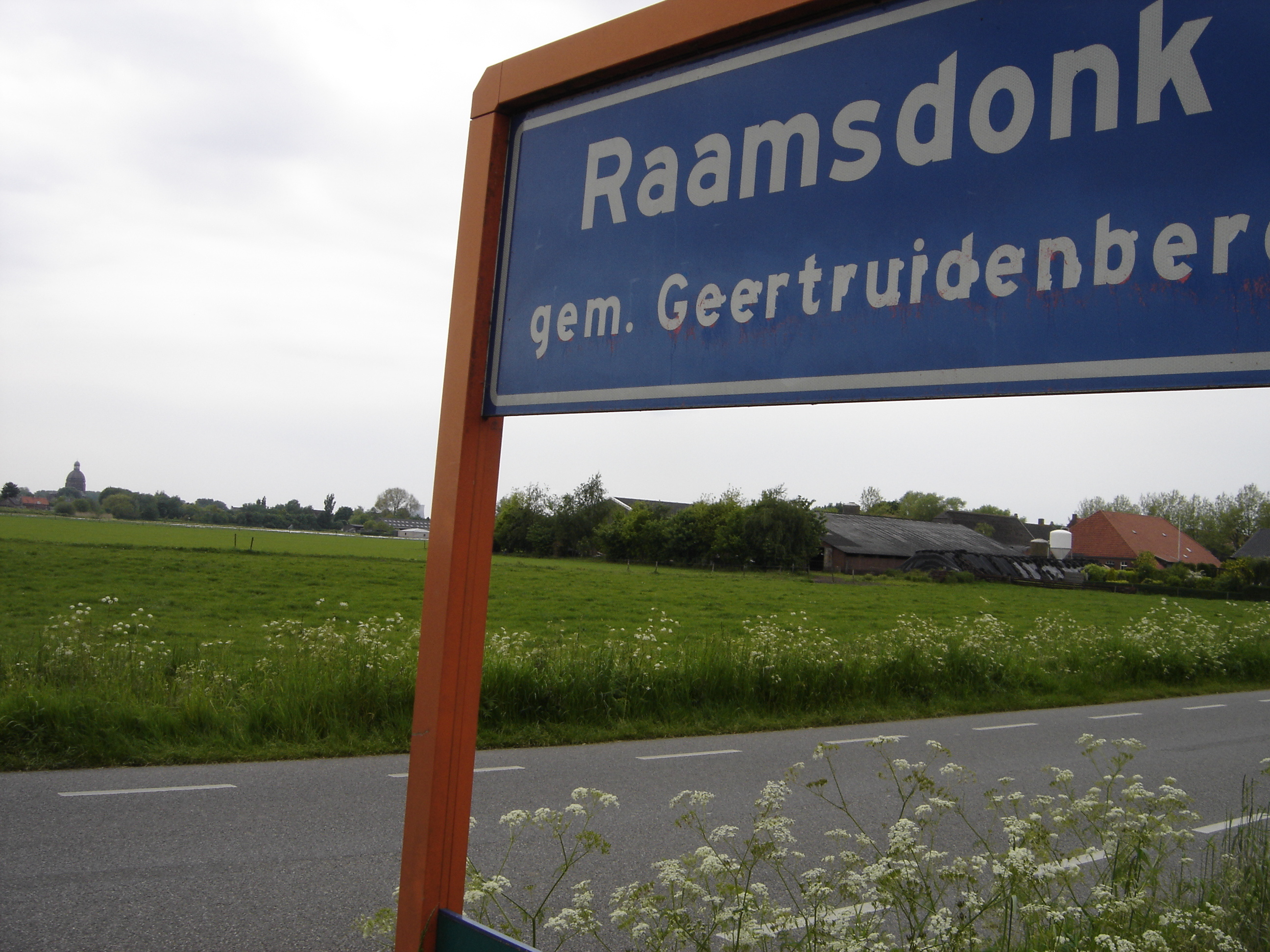
Entrance Wielstraat, view Raamsdonk-Dorp and Church of Saint-Bavo

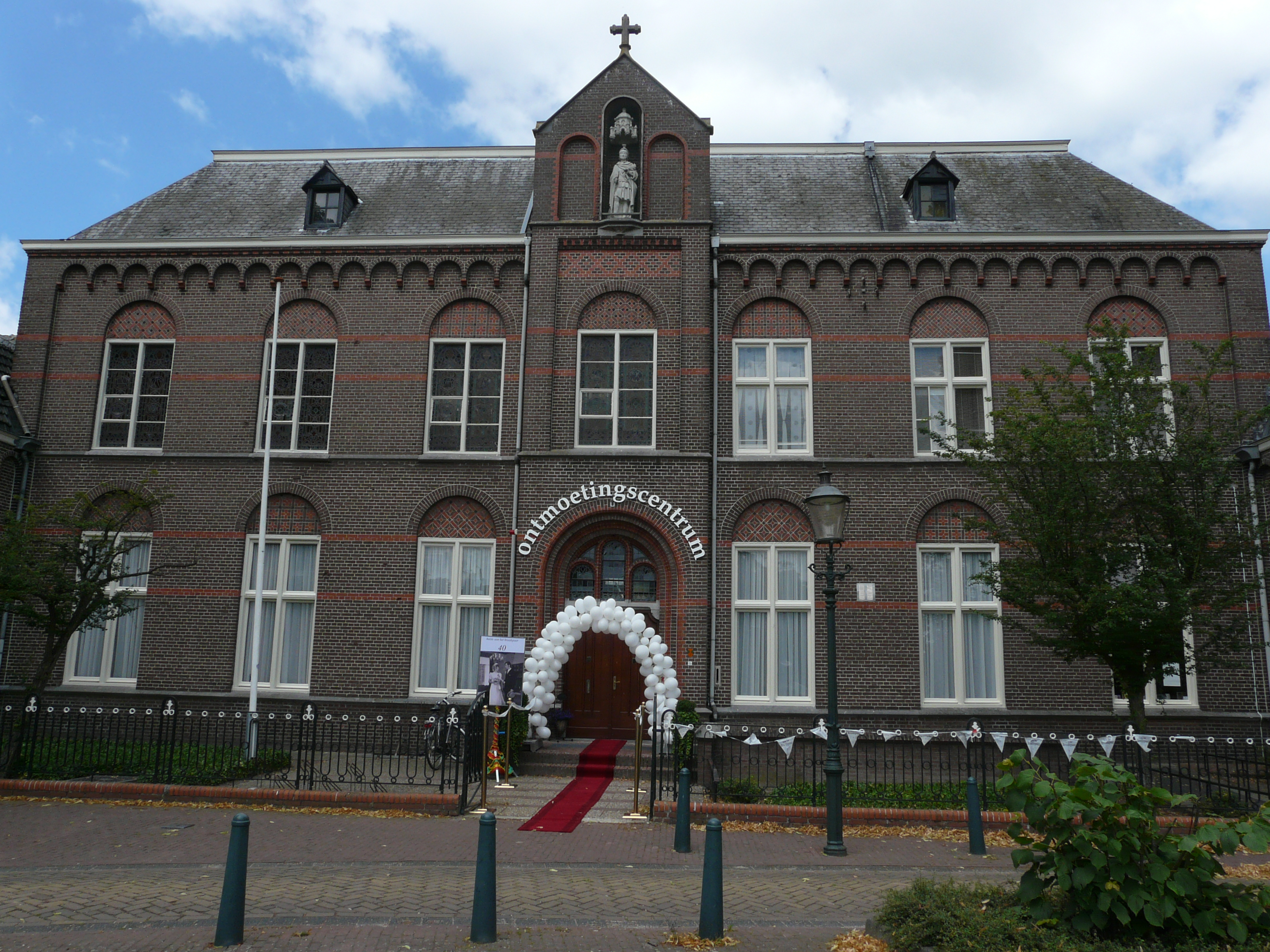
Ontmoetingscentrum
