= Donge (river) =

River in North Brabant, Netherlands

Coordinates: 51°40′39″N 4°54′35″E

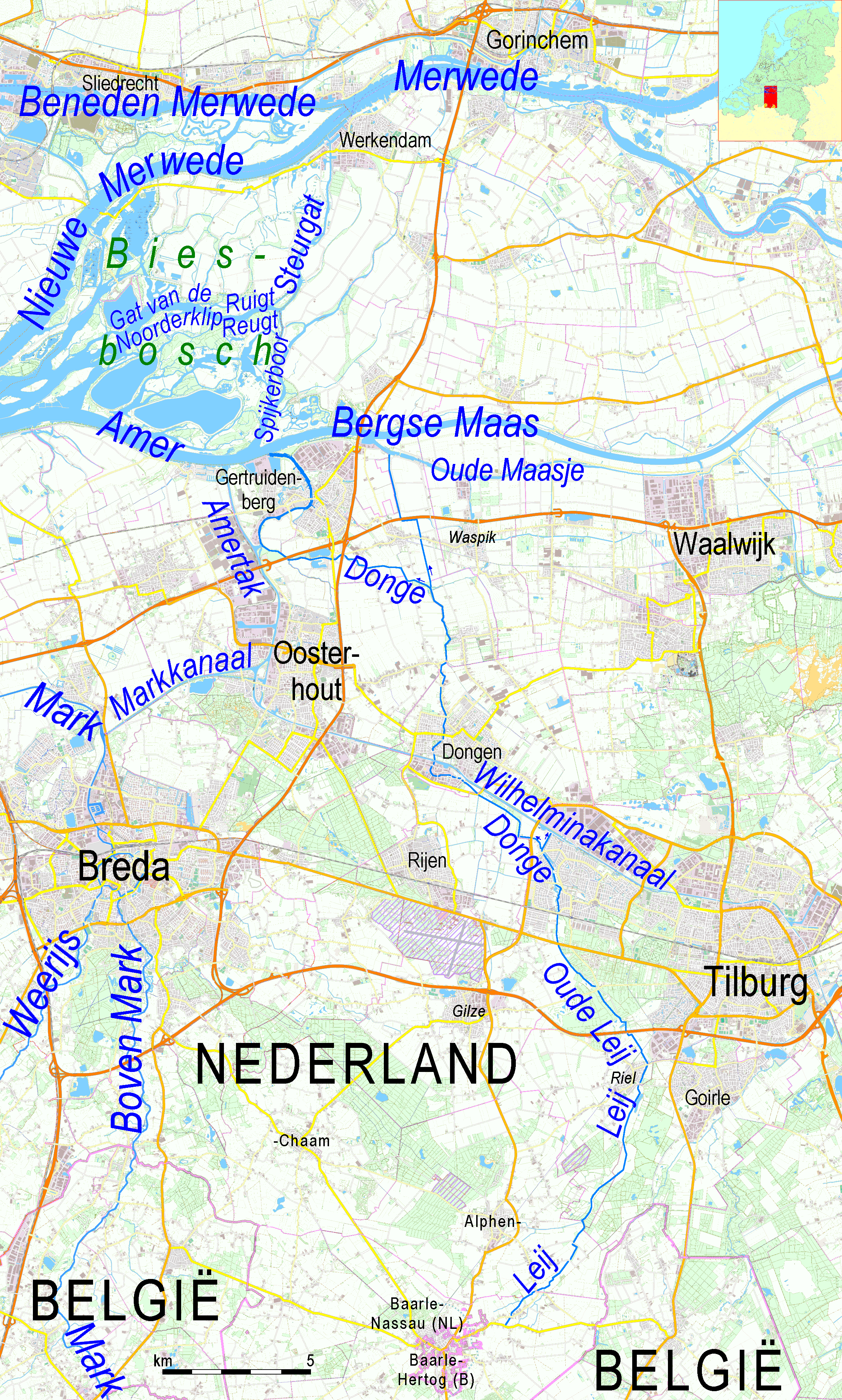
Donge river and its upper course Leij

The Donge is a small river in the Dutch province of North Brabant. It rises from springs east of Baarle-Nassau as a stream called Leij. Near Tilburg the name changes to Donge. It passes the village of Dongen and flows north to the town of Geertruidenberg where it is continued by the Amer together with the Bergse Maas.

The Donge has a length of 35 km.

== Use of the river ==
Because the Donge gets wider around the city of Geertruidenberg, it was mainly used for industrial purposes in that area. Until 1952 the powerplant Dongecentrale, which provided all of North Brabant with electricity was located at the river. When it was discontinued, the Amercentrale (located at the river Amer) took over its tasks, some of the ships with coals still use the Donge. Until 2005, 4 ship manufacturers were also located at the river.

The only big industry left at the banks of the river are in the north-east side, around Geertruidenberg.

In previous centuries, more upstream, the Donge was heavily used in the leather industry. Because of its relatively fast current, it was used to clean animal hides, and rinse chemicals from the processed product. Therefore, during the 20th century the Donge was one of the most polluted rivers in the Netherlands.

== Miscellanea ==
- Two sub-dialects of the Brabantian dialect arose due to the existence of the river. Because the people on either side of the river didn't have much contact in earlier days, West-Brabantian is mainly spoken on the west side of the river, as East-Brabantian is spoken, naturally, on the east side of the river.
