= Hendrik Spilman =

Dutch painter

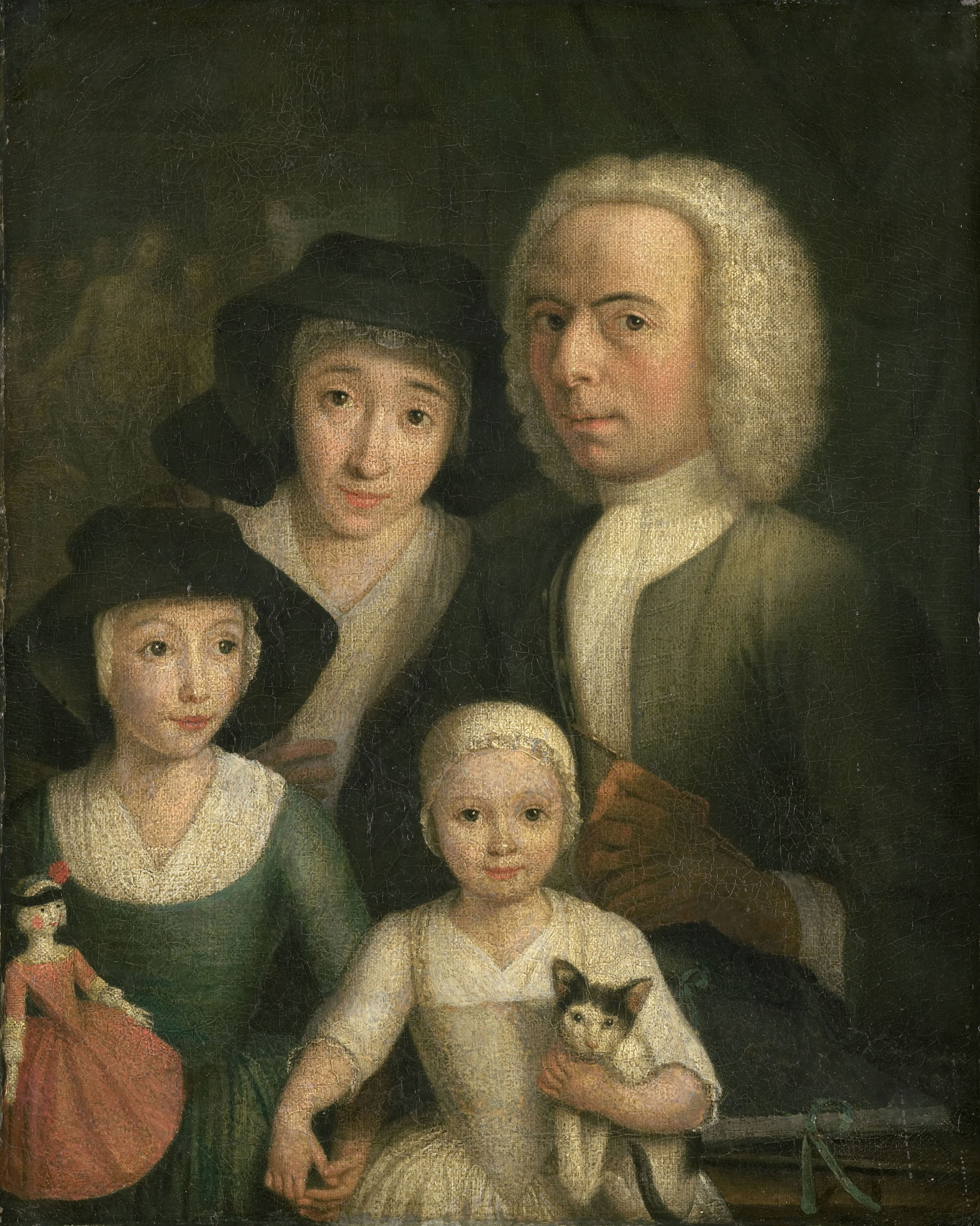
Self-portrait with his family

Hendrik Spilman (1721–1784) was an 18th-century painter and engraver from the Dutch Republic.

== Biography ==
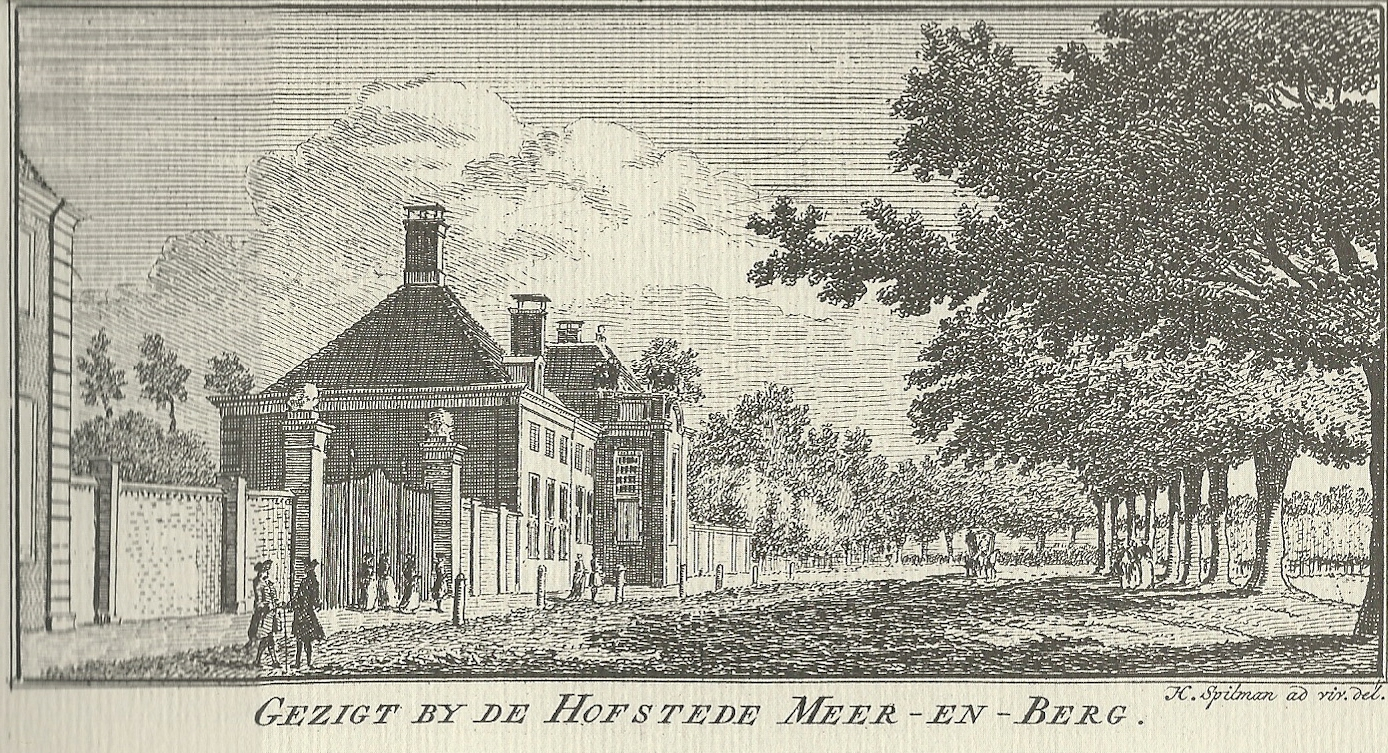
View of Meer en Berg on the Glipperdreef, Heemstede, the Netherlands, by Hendrik Spilman

He was born in Amsterdam. According to the RKD he spent his working life in Haarlem, where he enrolled in 1742 as a member of the Haarlem Guild of Saint Luke. He was a pupil of Abraham de Haen, who trained him as a painter and draughtsman, but he is best known for his topographical drawings and engravings of cityscapes and important buildings. He made engravings after drawings by de Haen, Jan de Beijer, Cornelis Pronk, and Cornelis van Noorde in addition to his own work for various publications. He died in Haarlem in 1784.

== Published works ==
- Het verheerlykt Nederland of Kabinet van Hedendaagsche gezigten. This nine-part work was published between 1745 and 1774 by Isaac Tirion in Amsterdam as an illustration to his Hedendaagsche historie of Tegenwoordige Staat der Vereenigde Nederlanden
- Aangenaame Gezichten in de vermakelyke landsdouwen van Haarlem, with engravings by Spilman and van Noorde, 1761
- Nederlandsche tafereelen; of eene keurige verzameling van negen honderd fraaije gezigten van steden, dorpen, sloten, oudheden, adelyke huizen, hofsteden, kerken, torens, poorten, gestichten, en veele andere aanzienlyke stads- en landsgebouwen; in en omtrent de zeven vereenigde Nederlandsche provintien, with engravings by Spilman, Pronk, De Beijer, and Adriaen van Swijndrecht, 1792
