= Rosenburgh Castle =

Castle in the Netherlands

- Kasteel Rosenburgh
- Voorschoten, the Netherlands
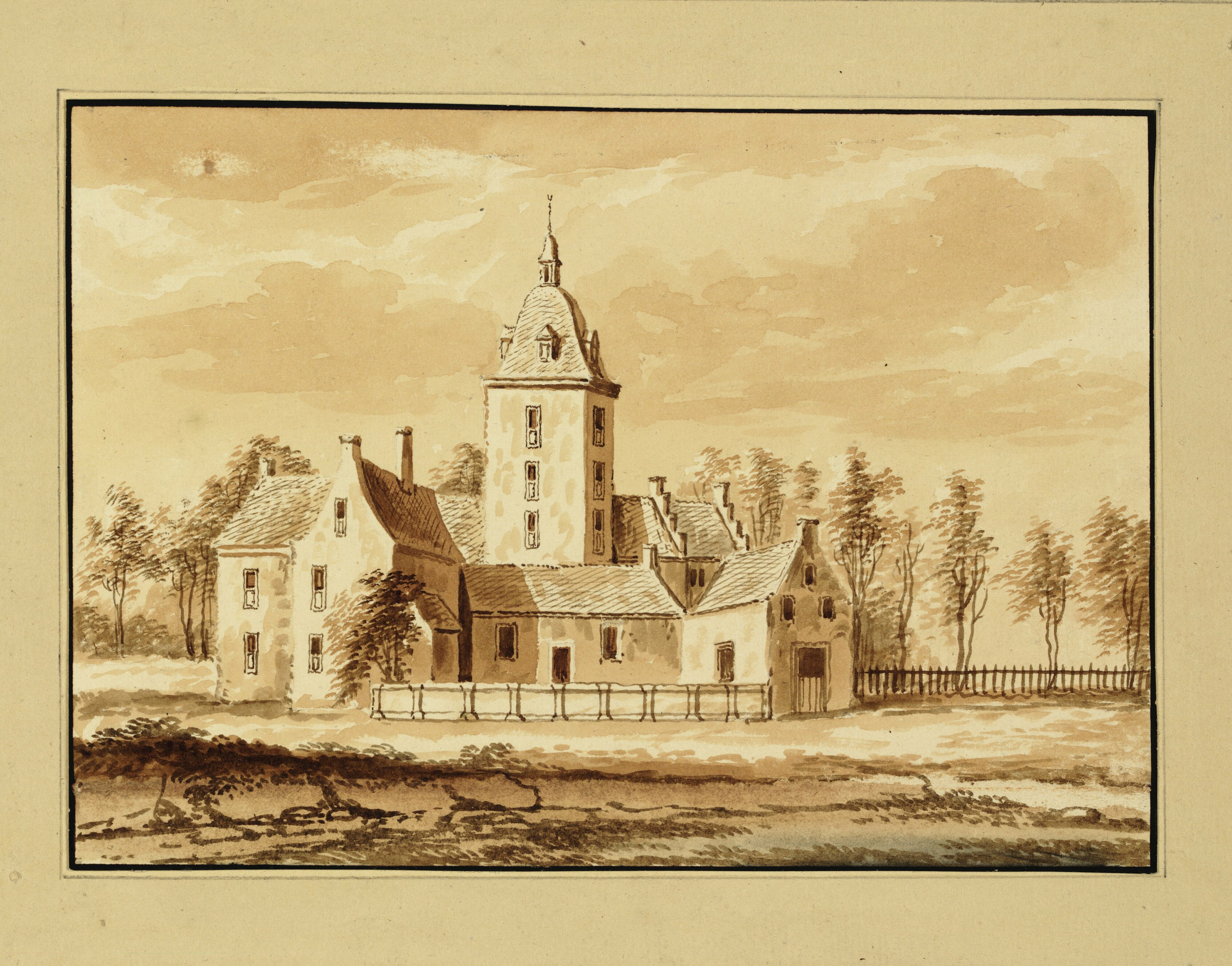
- Rosenburgh Castle before 1723 by Abraham Rademaker

Site information
- Type: Castle and manor

Location
- South Holland
- Location within South Holland
- Coordinates: 52.118822°N 4.428770°E

Site history
- Built: 1281–84
- Materials: brick
- Demolished: c. 1730
- Battles/wars: Siege of Rosenburgh (1351)

Rosenburgh Castle or Rosenburg was a castle located in today's Voorschoten, the Netherlands. In the early 1700s, it was replaced by a manor which was demolished only a few years after its construction. Rosenburgh Castle was the center of a significant siege in 1351.

== History ==
=== The medieval castle ===
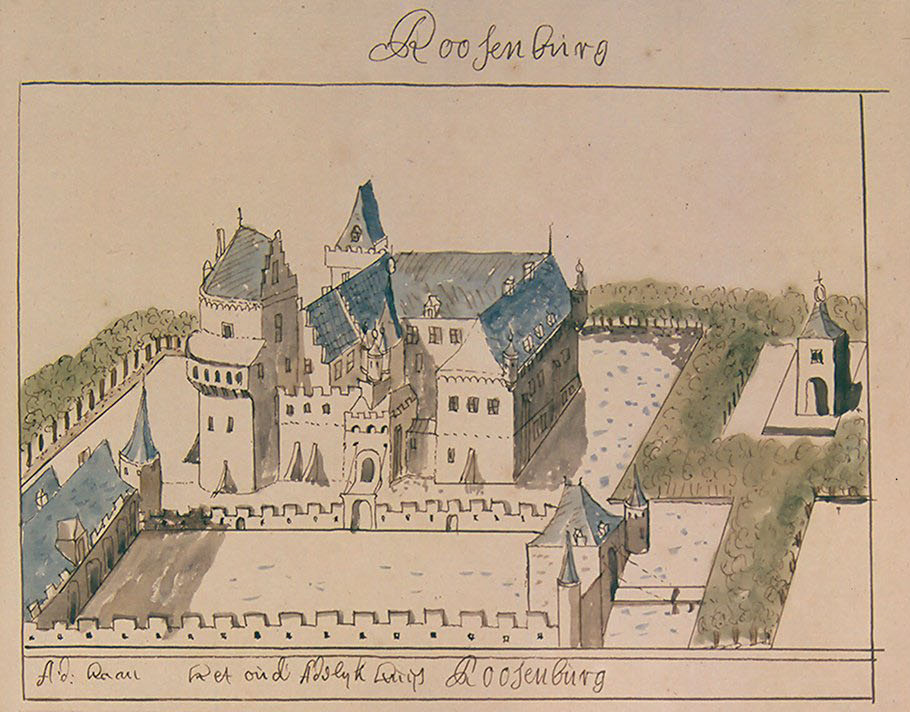
Erroneous 1725 drawing of the former castle.

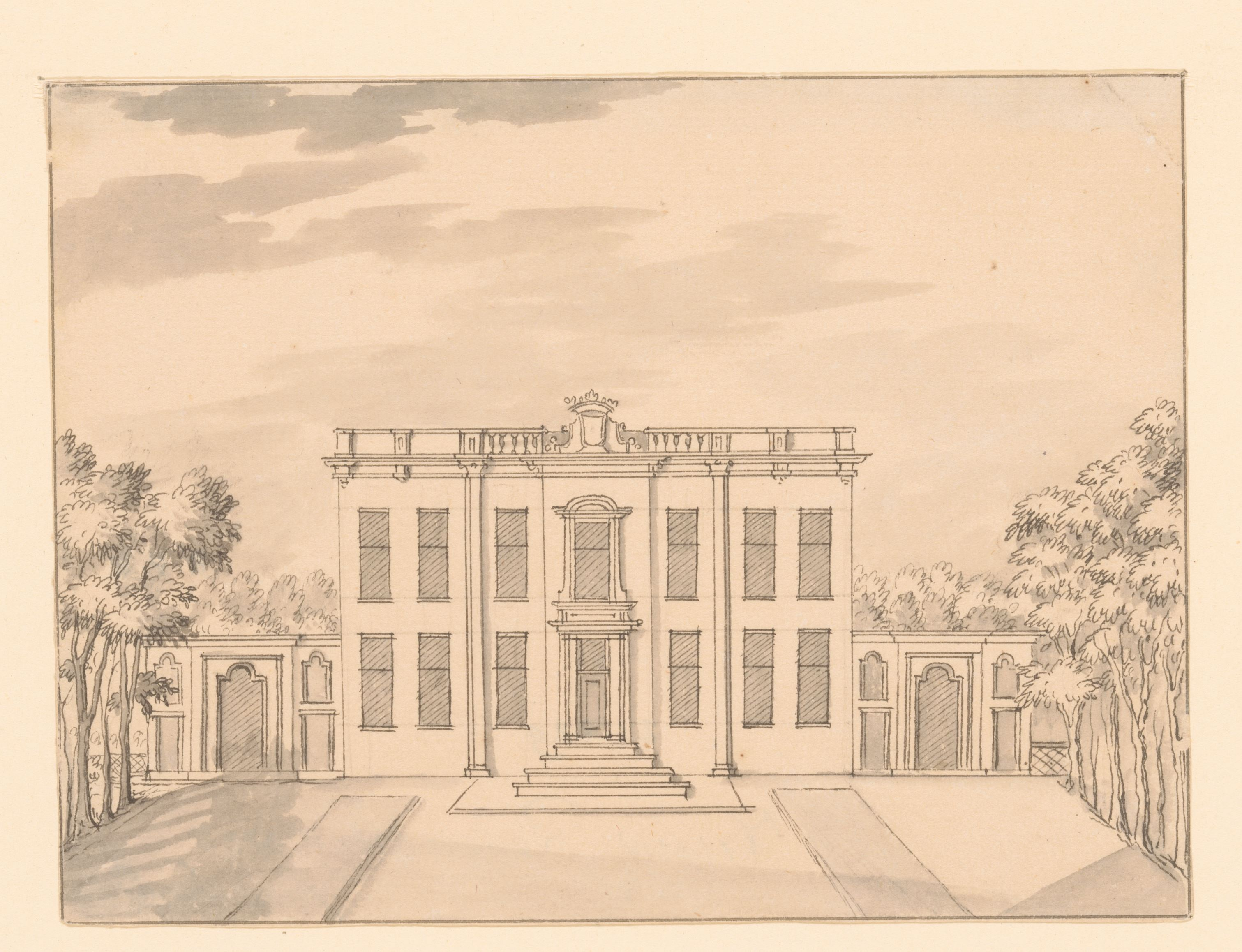
The 1725 manor

Rosenburgh Castle was built by Knight Jacob van Wassenaar. He was a son of Dirk second Lord of Wassenaar. Jacob had a daughter Jacoba, who married Simon van Benthem. Simon descended from a younger brother of Dirk VI, Count of Holland (c. 1114 – August 1157). Simon and Jacoba had: Willem named De Walkanoye, Jacob van Rosenburg and Jan van Rosenburg. Jan van Rosenburg was mentioned in 1318. His son Gijsbrecht had a daughter. She married Arent van Heukelom Lord of Leyenburg. The owner then sold Rosenburg to Arent van Heukelom.

In 1351 Rosenburgh Castle was held by the Hook side during the first of the Hook and Cod wars. From 28 March till 21 May 1351, the castle was besieged and taken by the Cod forces. For some time, the siege was led by Count William V. It must be assumed that the castle was razed to the ground after the siege. The siege is remarkable, because it has the first note of the use of gunpowder in the Netherlands.

=== Empty castle grounds ===
In 1399 Arent sold the terrain of Rosenburgh, 60 morgen of land, and three tithes that were connected to it, to Simon Sturlinx.

Simon's daughter Alide inherited the possession (goed) Rosenburgh from her father in 1422. Before 1473, Catherine, daughter of Jacob Andrieszoon, sold one third of Rosenburgh to Jan de Waal. In 1482 Daam Meeusz. sold another third of the 'Hofstede' Rosenburgh to Jan de Waal.

=== The second castle (1482/1534 - 1617) ===
Somewhere between 1482 and 1534, a second castle was built at the site. It may have included some remains of the previous castle.

In 1534 Frank de Waal sold Rosenburgh and its tithes to Adriaan Stalpert, bailiff of Kennemerland and West Friesland. In 1558 his son Jacob succeeded to two of the tithes. Rosenburgh itself went to his daughter Maria, married to Rutger van IJlem. Maria Stalpert and Rutger van IJlem had three children. Their son Adriaan got Roosenburg and two-thirds of the lands. The rest went to Maria and Jacob Stalpert.

The second castle was reportedly destroyed during the 1573 Siege of Leiden. Adriaan van IJlem rebuilt the castle in 1617.

Jacob Stalpert, who got only the 'Donk' tith, was followed by his son Jan, who was in turn succeeded by Maria Stalpert. She was the wife of Casper Wijntgis münzmeister of West Friesland.

In 1634 Pieter de Wit bought Rosenburgh from the daughters of Rutger van IJlem. In 1635 he bought the Donk tith from the Wijntgis family.

The Leiden professor Jacob Mastertius bought Rosenburgh from Pieter de Wit's widow. From him it came to his nephew Antony Eller Mastertius.

=== The manor ===
Jan Gerrit baron van Wassenaar (1672-1723) made a career in the Dutch navy, crowned by becoming Lieutenant admiral of Holland. He retired shortly after 1709. In 1707 he married Maria Jacoba Barones of Liere, by which he had two children. Jan Gerrit called himself 'Heer van Rosenburg'.

From 1721 to 1723, Van Wassenaar built a splendid new manor at Rosenburgh. When Jan Gerrit died in the very year of its completion, he was succeeded by his 13-year-old son Jacob Jan. When he died in turn in 1728, Jacob Jan's heir was the Lady van Liere van Katwijk. She had the house completely demolished. Only an annex was left.

== Castle Characteristics ==
=== The medieval castle ===
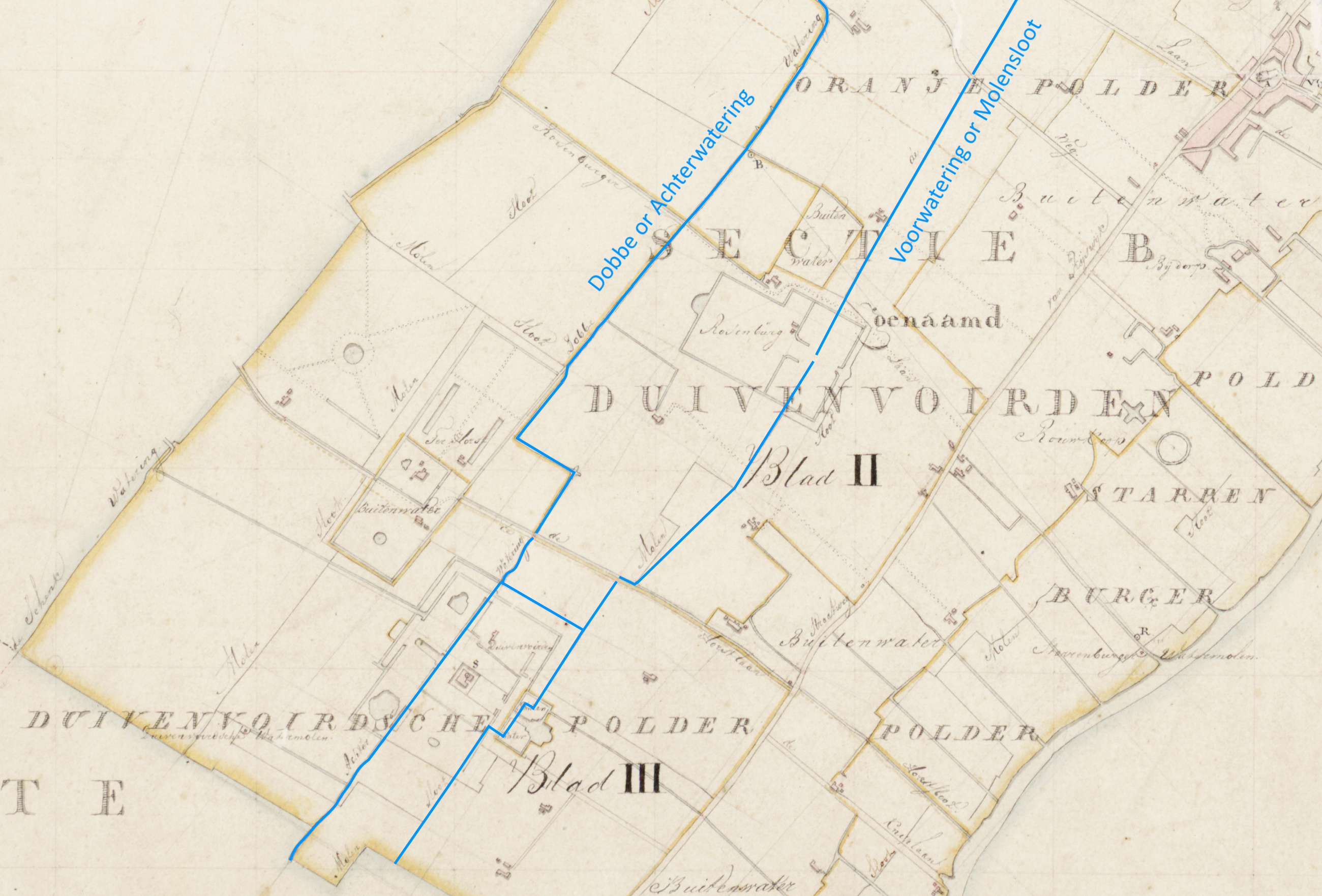
1821 map with 1615 water courses.

Rosenburgh Castle was built about 1 kilometer north-northeast of Duivenvoorde Castle. That is, it has always been assumed that the terrain now known as Rosenburgh was the location of the first castle. The well known archaeologist Jaap Renaud noted that the Voorwetering, on which the Castle was located before 1721, was diverted before the manor was built. In other words, a big slice of the southeast part of the current terrain did not belong to the first castles, see 1821 map. In 1952 Renaud set out to find the medieval castle. He was very optimistic, but his quest failed. Renaud even concluded that the foundations of the medieval castle had been removed.

In 2010 much debris was found during an archaeological investigation with earth augers. The investigation indicated that the medieval castle was located northwest of the later manor. The location of the manor would be determined in subsequent investigation.

When Van der Houve's wrote his 1636 chronyck, the second castle was still standing. Van der Houve claimed that heavy foundations were found up to 18 Rijnlandse roeden (3.767358 m) or about 68 m from the tower of the second castle. These foundations were up to 6 bricks wide. They consisted of brick that measured 1 by 0.5 by 0.25 Rijnland feet (0.3140 m). Van der Houve also mentioned that medieval pottery (Jacobakanetjes) had been found near the foundations. The brick measurements translate to bricks of 31 * 15.7 * 7.8 cm. The brick measurements and the pottery clearly point to remains of the medieval castle.

The 1399 and subsequent sales of Rosenburgh refer to the Hofstede (terrain of) Rosenburgh. This implies that in 1399, there was no castle at Rosenburgh. As no picture exists of the medieval castle, and there are no reliable descriptions, nothing is known of what the medieval castle looked like.

=== The second castle ===
In the 1950s the archaeologist Jaap Renaud came to some conclusions about the building that succeeded to the first castle. Renaud concluded that the building that was destroyed during the 1573 Siege of Leiden and was rebuilt in the early 17th century, dated from between 1482 and 1534.

Van der Houve claimed that the second castle included two remains from the old castle: A large square vaulted basement; and part of an old tower. In 1635 the tower had been reconstructed on the old work together with an elegant building. Van der Houve also mentioned a commemorative stone inside the second castle. In Latin, it said that the castle had been destroyed during the 1573 Siege of Leiden and had been rebuilt by Adrian van Ylem in 1617.

Van der Houve's claim that the second castle contained parts of the first castle, has been acknowledged in so far that in 1635 the house contained 'older parts'.

In 1725, the artist Abraham de Haen attempted to reconstruct the previous castle, see the 1725 drawing of the castle which bears his autograph. De Haen actually visited the castle for this drawing, see below. The fact that it is now known that De Haen actually visited the site and that the outline of his 1725 castle matches the 1725 situation of the terrain, show that the drawing is erroneous. Projected on the 1725 terrain, the main castle would measure nearly 200 by 200 m! On the other hand, the picture might reflect that at the time, it was still known that in medieval times the terrain in the foreground was an outer bailey, and the terrain in the background contained the main castle.

=== The manor ===
The manor drew many art lovers to Voorschoten. The artist Abraham de Haen (1707-1748) wrote that he made a drawing of the manor in 1725. He noted that it was overly luxurious and 'palace-like', but not yet completely finished. De Haen's drawing of the manor only survives in a copy made by Andries Schoemaker.

In the 1960s a connection was made between some designs found in the National Archives and the Rosenburgh site. The designs were by the well known architect Daniel Marot.

In 2012, there was an archaeological excavation on the grounds of Rosenburgh Castle. It was ordered because the petting zoo "Kinderboerderij Voorschoten", which was already established on the terrain, wanted to expand. The excavation found four foundations of the Marot Manor. The archaeological agency advised to safeguard these traces by an excavation. The new main building of the petting zoo was nevertheless constructed at the site of the Marot manor.

A more surprising result was that no medieval traces were found at the site of what is now the petting zoo. This shows that the medieval castle and the second castle were located somewhere else. It meant that the locations of the castles and the manor, which had still been supposed to be identical one year earlier, were different.
