= De Haen =

De Haen is a Dutch surname. Notable people with the surname include:

- Abraham de Haen (1707–1748), Dutch engraver
- Anton de Haen (1704–1776), Austrian physician
- David de Haen (1585–1622), Dutch painter and draughtsman
