= Jan Stolker =

Dutch painter

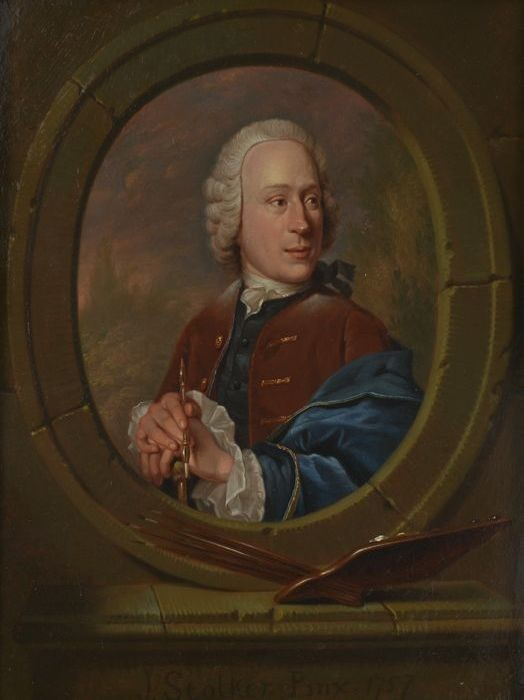
- Self-portrait, 1757
- Born: 1 July 1724; Amsterdam, Dutch Republic
- Died: 10 June 1785 (aged 60); Rotterdam, Dutch Republic

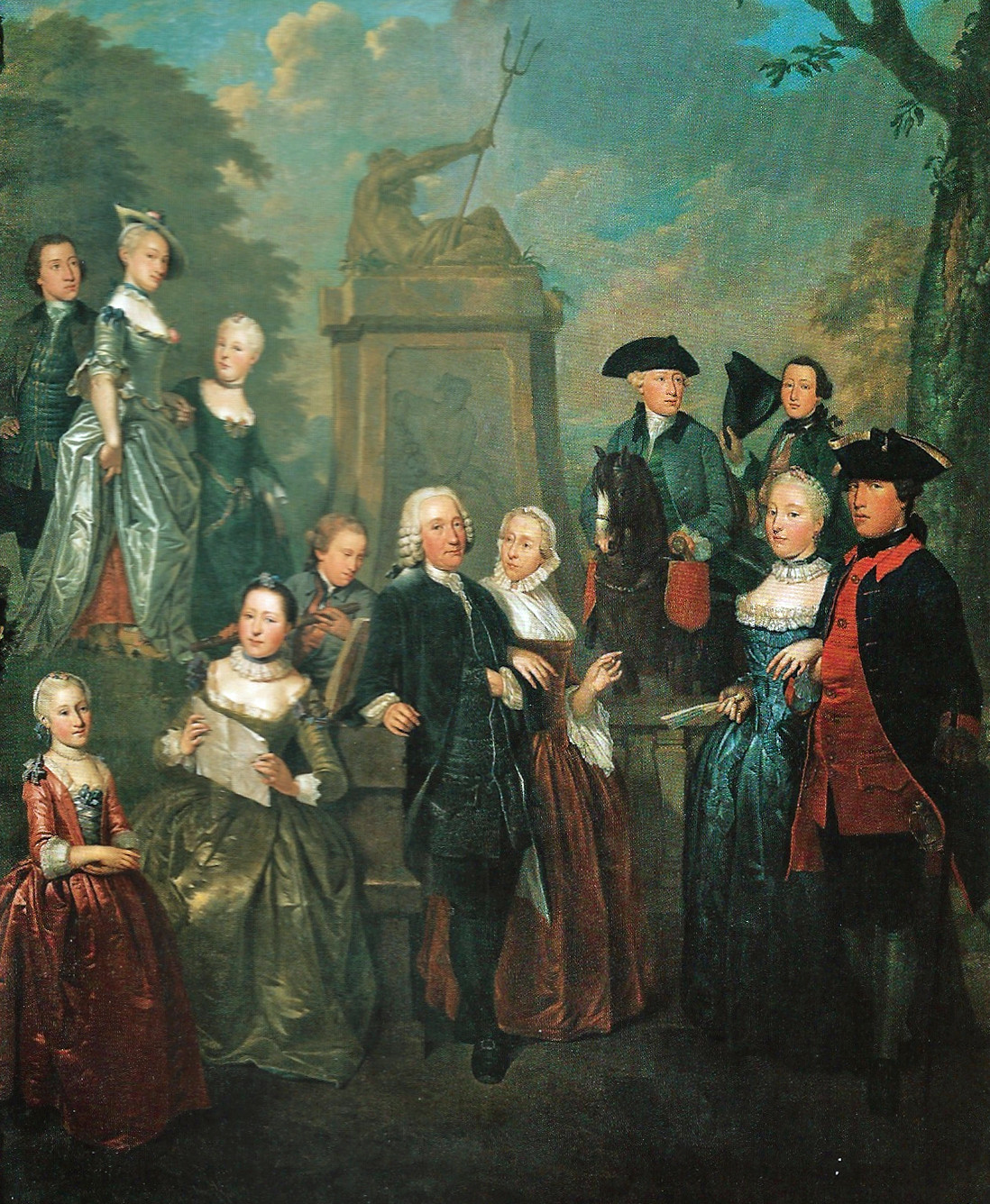
Family Bisdom by Jan Stolker

Jan Stolker (1 July 1724 – 10 June 1785) was a Dutch printmaker, painter, painting dealer, and art collector.

Stolker was born in Amsterdam and became a pupil of Jan Maurits Quinkhard. He is known for portraits and copies of 17th-century artists. He was a member of the Confrerie Pictura and the Rotterdam Guild of Saint Luke.

Stolker died in Rotterdam.
