= Tibout Regters =

Dutch painter

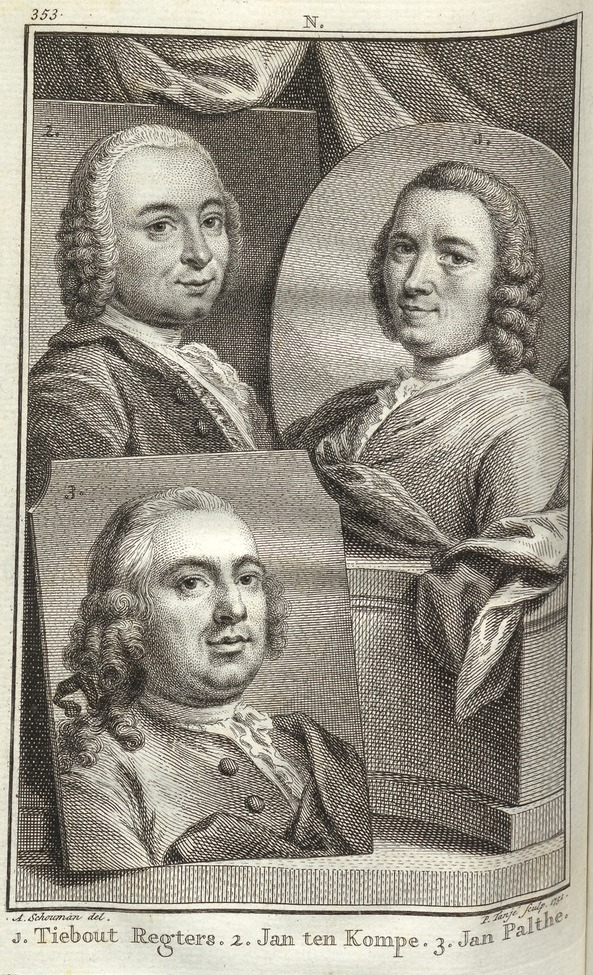
- Tibout Regters upper right in Jan van Gool's Nieuw Schouburg
- Born: 24 December 1710; Dordrecht, Holland, The Netherlands
- Died: 26 January 1768 (aged 57); Amsterdam, Holland, The Netherlands

Tibout Regters (24 December 1710 – 26 January 1768) was an 18th-century portrait painter from the Dutch Republic.

== Biography ==
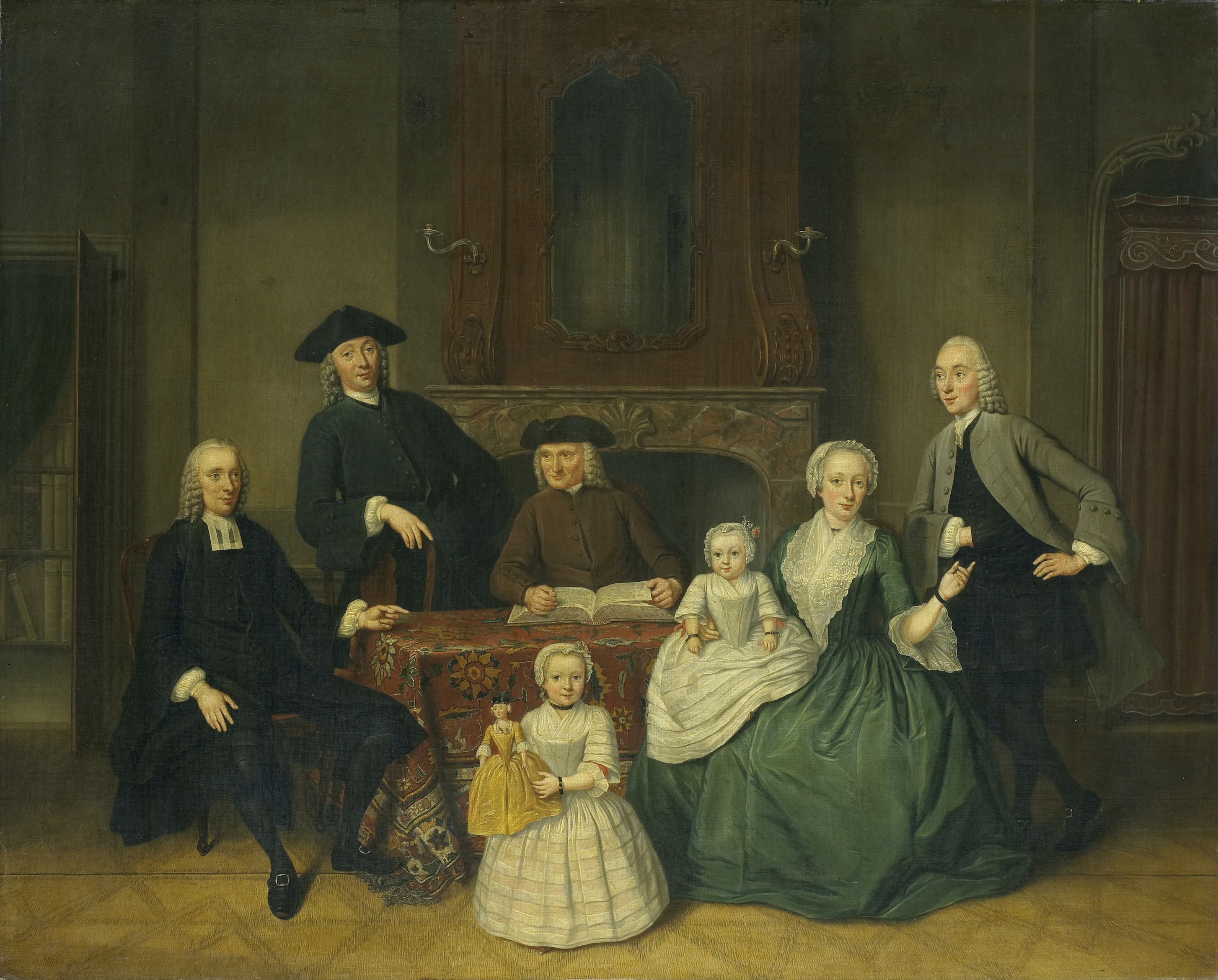
Portrait of the Amsterdam Mennonite Brak family

Regters was born in Dordrecht. According to his biographer Jan van Gool, his parents moved when he was two years old to Arnhem, where he grew up. He was first sent to learn painting from Ten Haeg, and then moved to Rotterdam at age 20 to study for two years with Meyer. He then moved to Amsterdam and first went to work for Wannenberg before becoming the pupil of Jan Maurits Quinkhard for 5 years. At the end of this period he was an able portrait painter, and Van Gool visited his studio in 1751 in Amsterdam where he saw a good full-length portrait of the painter Ludolf Bakhuizen and a large group portrait that he was working on of the regents of the Amsterdam Almoezeniers orphanage.

According to the RKD, Regters was a pupil of Jan Maurits Quinkhard, and he worked in Dordrecht, Amsterdam, Arnhem and Rotterdam. He died in Amsterdam.
