= Hermanus Angelkot Jr. =

Dutch writer (1668–1727)

Hermanus or Hermannus Angelkot Jr. (bapt. 6 February 1688, Amsterdam – d. 1727) was an Amsterdam pharmacist who also wrote poems and plays. He was the son of Judith Muijsart and Hermanus Angelkot Sr. (ca. 1648 - ca. 1713), who also wrote plays and practised as a pharmacist. The sources often cite father and son interchangeably. Hermanus Jr. married Catharina te Naerde in Amsterdam before 1717.

Angelkot Jr. was friendly with Pieter Langendijk who was the first to translate Molière into Dutch. Together they wrote Cato, of de ondergang der Roomsche vryheid (1715), based on Joseph Addison's Cato, a Tragedy (1713), dedicating it to the then mayor of Amsterdam, Nicolaes Witsen.

== Works ==
- Vechter
- Het voutje van Esphesen
- Cato, of de ondergang der Roomsche vryheid (1715, with Pieter Langendijk)
