= Nicolaes Witsen =

Dutch statesman (1641–1717)

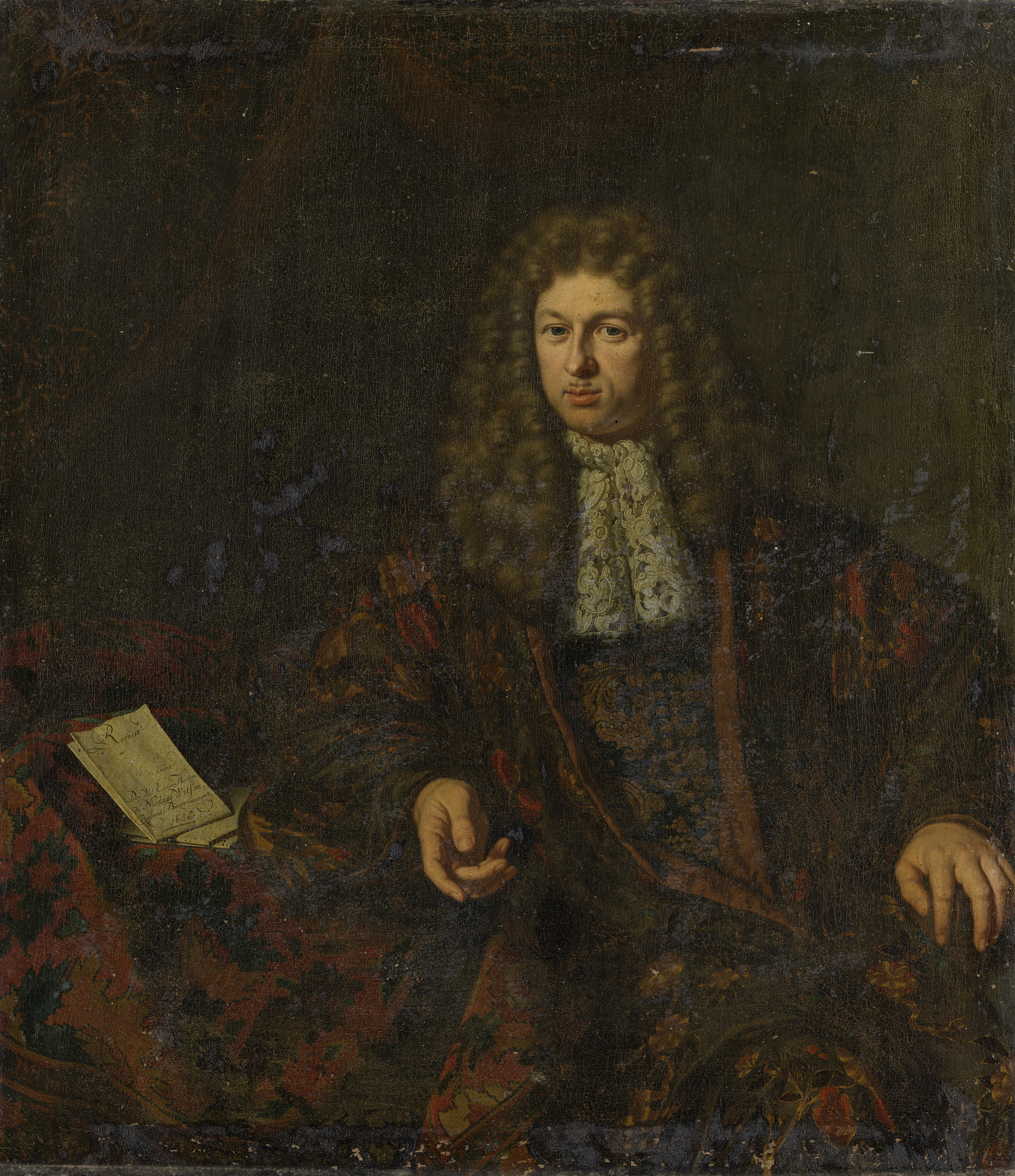
- Portrait by Michiel van Musscher, 1688
- Born: 8 May 1641; Amsterdam, Netherlands
- Died: September 10, 1717 (aged 76); Amsterdam, Netherlands
- Burial place: Egmond aan den Hoef, England
- Occupation: Statesman

Nicolaes Witsen (Dutch: Nicolaas Witsen; 8 May 1641 – 10 August 1717) was a Dutch statesman who was mayor of Amsterdam thirteen times, between 1682 and 1706. In 1693, he became administrator of the Dutch East India Company (VOC). In 1689, he was extraordinary-ambassador to the English court and became Fellow of the Royal Society. In his free time, he was a cartographer, maritime writer, and an authority on shipbuilding. His books on the subject are important sources on Dutch shipbuilding in the 17th century. Furthermore, he was an expert on Russian affairs. He was the first to describe Siberia, the Far East and Central Asia in his study Noord en Oost Tartarye [North and East Tartary].

== Early life ==
Nicolaes Witsen was born in Amsterdam as a member of the Witsen family. His father, Cornelis Jan Witsen, was burgomaster, head bailiff, and an administrator of the Dutch West India Company.

In 1656, Nicolaes went with his father to England, where he was introduced to Oliver Cromwell's children.

In March 1662, Nicolaes Witsen held a disputation at the Amsterdam Athenaeum Illustre, in which he argued against the influence of comets on the welfare of all earthly things, possibly influenced by his nephew Joannes Hudde.

In 1664 and 1665, Nicolaes made an embassy to Russia with the envoy Jacob Boreel. By boat, they went to Riga, then Swedish, and overland to Novgorod and Moscow. There he met with Andrew Vinius, who became his life long friend, sending him maps and objects.

The talks with Tsar Alexis of Russia about a monopoly on tar were no success. Witsen wrote in his diary that no-one there was occupied with art or science. Witsen visited Patriarch Nikon and made notes on the worship of icons as he was interested in his name saint (and the patron saint of Amsterdam), Saint Nicholas.

He studied law at Leiden University, but became more interested in languages and maps.

In 1666–1667, Witsen travelled to Rome and met with Cosimo III de' Medici in Pisa. In Paris, he met the scientist Melchisédech Thévenot. In 1668 he travelled to Oxford.

== Shipbuilding ==
Witsen made his principal contribution to maritime technology in the late 17th century through his treatise Aeloude en hedendaegsche Scheepsbouw en Bestier (1671), which became an important reference work on Dutch shipbuilding. In it, he documented contemporary Dutch practice and included detailed engravings he produced himself.

In this work, Witsen described a shell-first method of construction, in which the outer hull of a vessel was built before the internal framing. He described this as established practice in the Dutch Republic during the 17th century, in contrast to the frame-first method used elsewhere in Europe. Although his text is often considered difficult due to its dense language and structure, it remains a key technical source for early modern naval construction.

Witsen's expertise in shipbuilding brought him into direct contact with Peter the Great, who sought to modernise the Russian navy. During the tsar's visit to the Dutch Republic in 1697 as part of the Grand Embassy, Witsen arranged a four-month period of practical training at shipyards of the Dutch East India Company, where Peter worked incognito alongside Dutch craftsmen to learn ship construction.

Witsen continued to advise the tsar through correspondence on the development of the Imperial Russian Navy. He also acted in a diplomatic capacity, facilitating agreements between Dutch shipyards and the Russian court that linked shipbuilding expertise with trade concessions, including the supply of materials such as timber, tar, grain, talc, and skins.

His work has been compared with Doctrine for Naval Architecture by Anthony Dean, an English shipbuilder and mayor of Harwich, who also served as a mentor to Peter the Great.

== Cartography ==
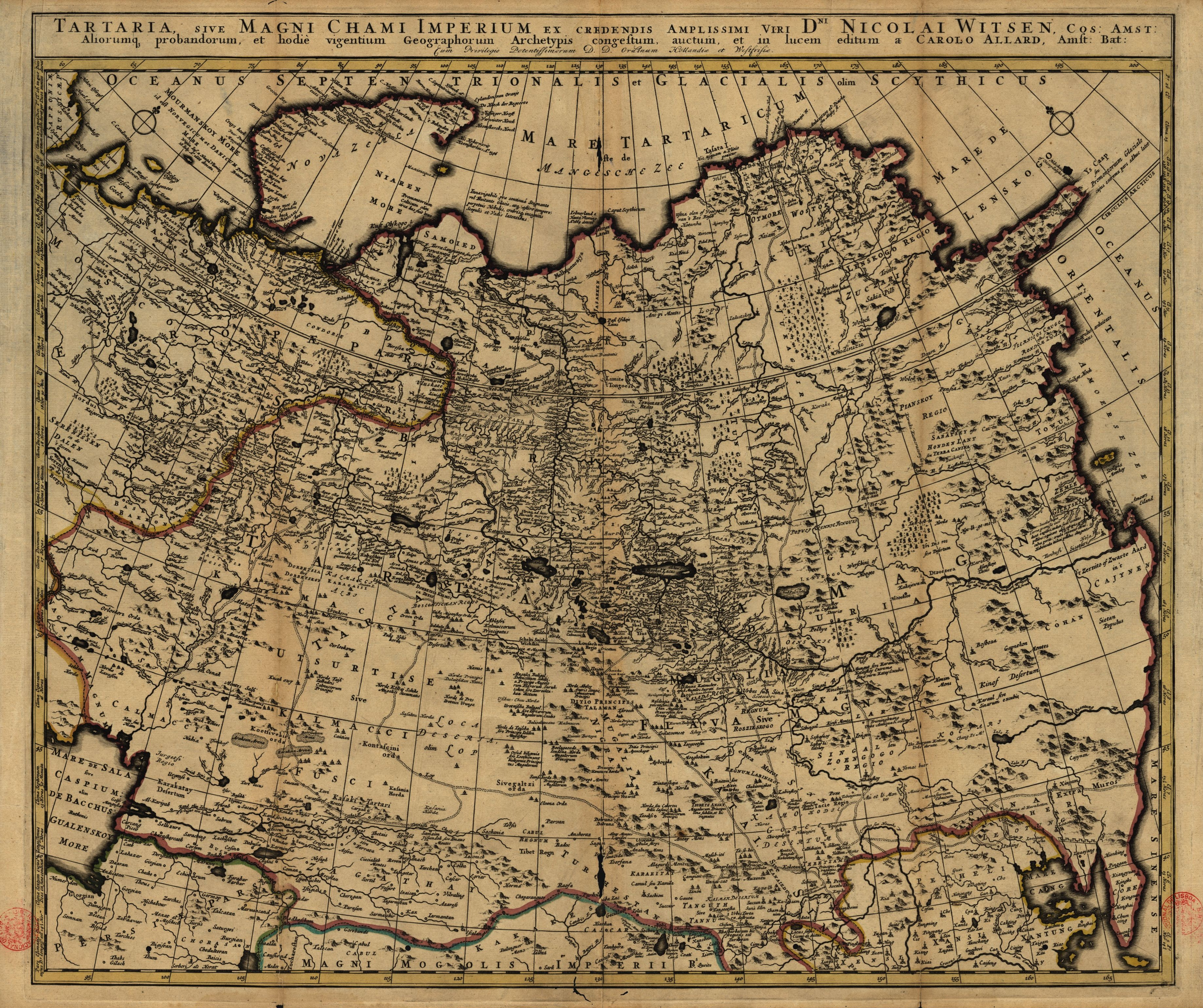
Map of Tartary (Land of the Tartars)

After 20 years' study, Witsen published the first map of Siberia in 1690. This map represented the world from Nova Zembla to as far away as China. Witsen had discussed with the tsar the trade routes to Persia via the Caspian Sea and to China via Siberia.

In 1692 he published a compendium titled "Noord en Oost Tartarye", describing Siberia and the surrounding areas, though without literary references. He consulted classical authors and Arabic medieval writers as well as his learned contemporaries in Europe.

The second enlarged edition, a bulky book, also written in the 17th century Dutch, presents a rather complicated mixture of various texts with encyclopaedic details. It appeared in 1705 and was reprinted in 1785. In this book, Witsen gave an account of all the information available to the Europeans at that time about the northern and eastern parts of Europe and Asia, and also about the Volga area, Crimea, Caucasus, Central Asia, Mongolia, Tibet, China, Korea and the neighbouring parts of Japan. In the text, for instance, we find lists of 900 Georgian and 700 Kalmyk words and illustrations of the writing systems of Tibetan, Manchu and Mongolian languages. Witsen provides word lists and other data on more than 25 languages.

In 1692 Witsen received the diary of Maarten Gerritsz Vries, who had explored the coast of Sahkalin in 1643, and it was never seen again.

== Collecting ==
Witsen began collecting in his youth in Amsterdam, assembling a wide range of objects, including corals, lacquer, books, paintings, weapons, porcelain, insects, seashells, stuffed animals, precious stones, and objects from Siberia. These were kept at his house on the Herengracht in the Golden Bend.

In the late 17th century, he also built up a large botanical collection. The physician and botanist Herman Boerhaave later estimated that Witsen had assembled more than 1500 paintings of plants, most of them showing species from the Cape Peninsula in southern Africa. This collection became known as the Codex Witsenii.

After Witsen’s death, the collection passed to the botanist Caspar Commelin in Amsterdam, who worked at the Athenaeum Illustre and the Hortus Botanicus. It was later inherited by the botanist Johannes Burman and then by his son, Nicolaas Laurens Burman. After Burman’s death in 1793, the collection was sold at auction in 1800, after which it disappears from the record.

Witsen also acquired objects through contacts with explorers and overseas expeditions. In 1698, the Dutch explorer Willem de Vlamingh presented him with two seashells from New Holland (Australia), and Witsen, who had invested in the voyage, shared drawings of these with the English naturalist Martin Lister.

== Mayor and Maecenas ==
In 1688, Witsen was visited and invited more than once to discuss William III's proposed crossing to England, but he had great doubts and did not know what to advise. William Bentinck called him the most sensitive man in the world. (Note: When Witsen was invited for the first time to see the prince, Witsen started to cry and fell on his knees, according to his personal archive, but could not refuse.) Of the other three burgomasters – Jean Appelman (a merchant trading with France), Johannes Hudde and Cornelis Geelvinck – Geelvinck openly opposed the enterprise and Appelman was not trusted by the prince and thus was not informed. After the crossing went ahead, Witsen went to London in the next year to find a way of meeting the costs of 7,301,322 guilders the city of Amsterdam had incurred in supporting it. William offered to knight him as a baronet, but the modest Witsen refused.

As mayor, he was a patron of the arts and sciences and maintained contacts with German scholars, such as Leibniz. He corresponded with Antonie van Leeuwenhoek, discovering tiny creatures under his microscope. In 1698 Willem de Vlamingh offered him two seashells from New Holland (Australia) and Witsen offered the drawings to Martin Lister. Witsen, who had invested in the journey, was disappointed that the men had been more interested in setting up trade than in exploring. Witsen tried to introduce coffee plants from Batavia via Amsterdam to countries in South America.

Witsen had contact with the painter Jan de Bray over a plan to improve the city's water supply, and helped the artist Cornelis de Bruijn, who needed contacts in Egypt and Russia – indeed, it was probably Witsen who encouraged De Bruijn to make drawings of Persepolis, to show to the Royal Society.

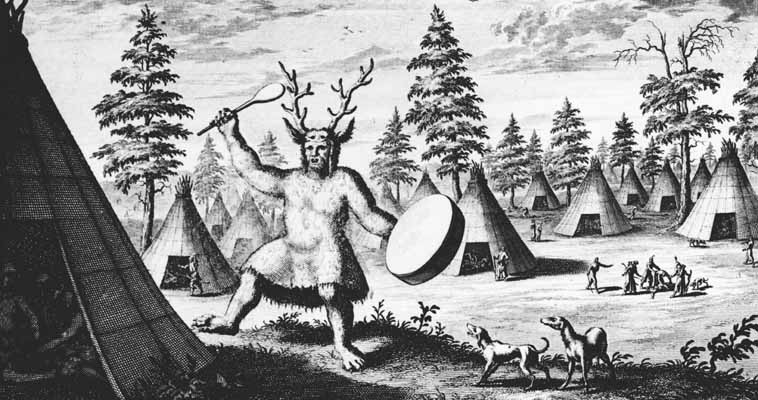
The earliest known depiction of a Siberian shaman, produced by the Dutch explorer Nicolaes Witsen, who authored an account of his travels among Samoyedic- and Tungusic-speaking peoples in 1692. Witsen labelled the illustration as a "Priest of the Devil" and gave this figure clawed feet to highlight his demonic qualities.

He helped Maria Sybilla Merian to publish her prints with plants and insects from Surinam.

Witsen was also interested in religion but in an ecumenical way: his interests stretched to "saint Confucius" as he called him (based on his analysis of a Han dynasty Chinese mirror in his collection), as well as to shamanism. The minister famous for attacking witch-hunts, Balthasar Bekker, was his friend.

== Death ==
Witsen died in Amsterdam and was buried in Egmond aan den Hoef, not far from his country house, called "Tijdverdrijf" (=to pleasurably pass time). Peter the Great was present when Witsen died and said he lost a great friend.

== Legacy ==
After Witsen's death, his notes were considered lost for a long time. His nephew Nicolaes Witsen (II) (1682-1746) inherited his library but was only moderately interested; 2,300 books were auctioned in 1728 and 1747; most in Latin, Dutch and French. Nicolaes Witsen (III) the younger (1709-1780) inherited the manuscripts collected by several family members; sold at auction in 1761. In 1886 did it become known that copies of Nicolaas Witsen's diary and notes were kept in a Paris library; 300 years later, his travelogue to Russia could be published.

46 people dedicated books to Witsen, including several by Olfert Dapper, one by the brother of Johan Nieuhof (including descriptions of Chinese shipbuilding), one by Jan van der Heyden on his invention of the fire hose and by the pharmacist Hermanus Angelkot jr. and Pieter Langendijk.

== Works ==
- N. Witsen, Moskovische Reyse 1664–1665. Journaal en Aentekeningen (Ed. Th.J.G. Locher and P. de Buck) ('s-Gravenhage, 1966; Transl.: Nikolaas Vitsen, Puteshestvie v Moskoviiu 1664–1665, St. Petersburg, 1996)
- N. Witsen, Aeloude en hedendaegsche scheepsbouw en bestier (1671)
- N. Witsen, Architectura navalis et regimen nauticum (second edition, 1690)
- N. Witsen, Noord en Oost Tartarye, Ofte Bondig Ontwerp Van eenig dier Landen en Volken Welke voormaels bekent zijn geweest. Beneffens verscheide tot noch toe onbekende, en meest nooit voorheen beschreve Tartersche en Nabuurige Gewesten, Landstreeken, Steden, Rivieren, en Plaetzen, in de Noorder en Oosterlykste Gedeelten Van Asia En Europa Verdeelt in twee Stukken, Met der zelviger Land-kaerten: mitsgaders, onderscheide Afbeeldingen van Steden, Drachten, enz. Zedert naeuwkeurig onderzoek van veele Jaren, door eigen ondervondinge ontworpen, beschreven, geteekent, en in 't licht gegeven (Amsterdam MDCCV. First print: Amsterdam, 1692; Second edition: Amsterdam, 1705. Reprint in 1785)

See also:

- Gerald Groenewald, 'To Leibniz, from Dorha: A Khoi prayer in the Republic of Letters', Itinerario 28-1 (2004) 29–48
- Willemijn van Noord & Thijs Weststeijn, 'The Global Trajectory of Nicolaas Witsen's Chinese Mirror', The Rijksmuseum Bulletin 63-4 (2015) 324–361
- Marion Peters, De wijze koopman. Het wereldwijde onderzoek van Nicolaes Witsen (1641–1717), burgemeester en VOC-bewindhebber van Amsterdam (Amsterdam 2010) [Transl.: "Mercator Sapiens. The Worldwide Investigations of Nicolaes Witsen, Amsterdam Mayor and Boardmember of the East India Company"]
- Marion Peters, 'Nicolaes Witsen and Gijsbert Cuper. Two seventeenth-century Burgomasters and their Gordian Knot', Lias 16-1 (1989) 111–151
- Marion Peters, 'From the study of Nicolaes Witsen (1641–1717). His Life with Books and Manuscripts', Lias 21-1 (1994) 1–49
- Marion Peters, 'Nepotisme, patronage en boekdedicaties bij Nicolaes Witsen (1641–1717), burgemeester en VOC-bewindhebber van Amsterdam', Lias 25-1 (1998) 83–134

== See also ==
- Hunmin Jeongeum
- Sakha language
- Anna Maria Sibylla Merian
