= Siege of Rosenburgh (1351) =

Siege of Rosenburgh Castle

- Part of the Hook and Cod wars
Date	28 March-21 May1351
Location	Voorschoten, County of Holland; Modern South Holland Region. 52.121835°N 4.436487°E
Result	Cod victory, castle demolished

Belligerents
Cod Faction	Hook Faction

Commanders and leaders
William V, Count of Holland	Unknown
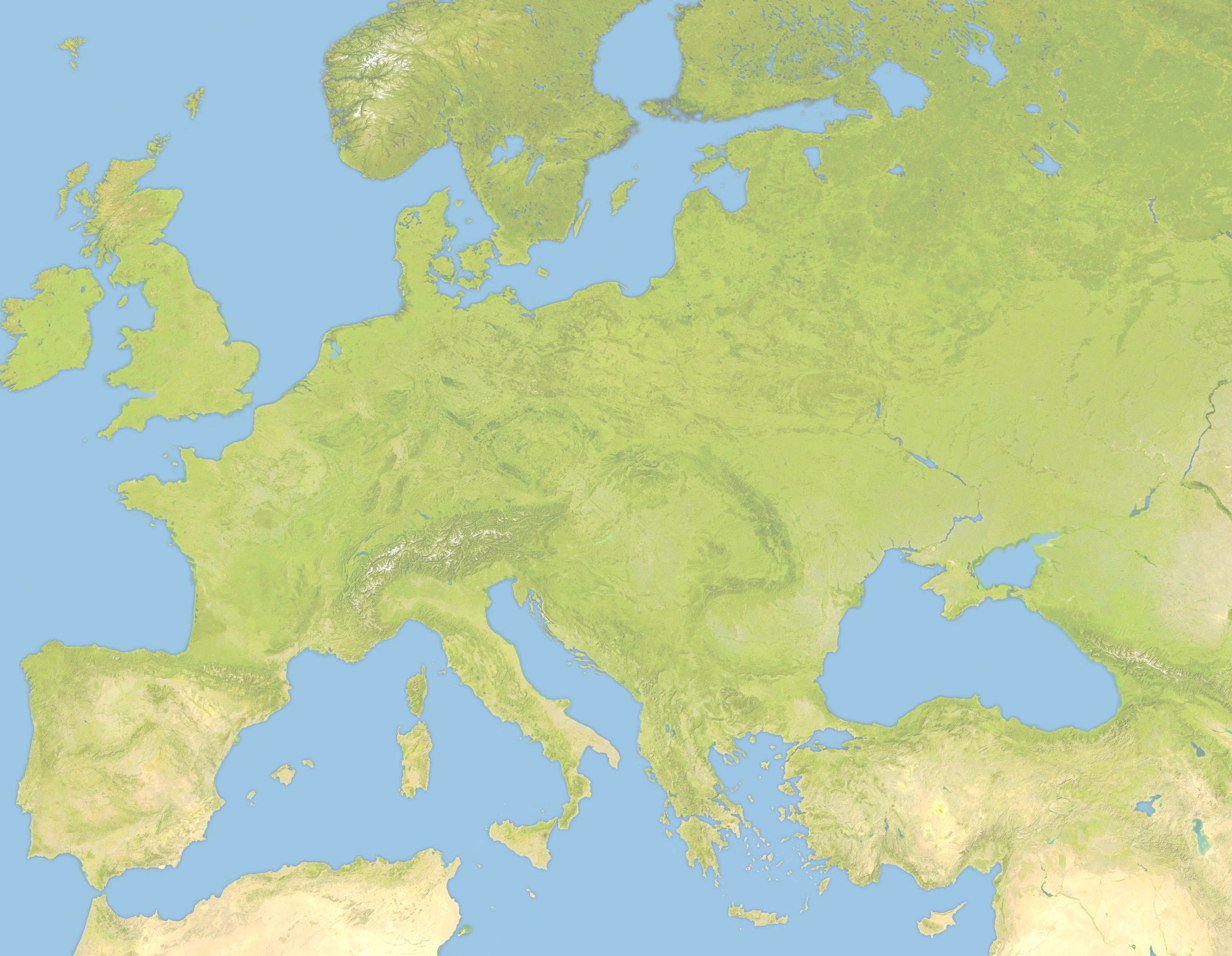
- Location within Netherlands Siege of Rosenburgh (1351) (Europe without the extreme north)

The Siege of Rosenburgh Castle was a major siege of the Hook and Cod Wars in which Cod forces besieged Rosenburgh Castle, which now lies in Voorschoten.

== Background ==
The Hook and Cod wars began he as a succession dispute between William I of Bavaria and Margaret II of Hainaut over the title "Count of Holland".

Margaret initially held the throne, until William rebelled in early 1351 and quickly asserted dominance after battles such as the Siege of Zierikzee and Battle of Zwartewaal.

== Siege ==
On March 28, 1351, shortly after the beginning of the conflict, forces led by William I of Bavaria began a two-month siege of the castle. It was one of the last Hook holdouts under the control of Margaret II of Hainaut, another being Geertruidenberg Castle, which was under siege until the next year. The castle surrendered on May 21.

The siege is notable as the first use of gunpowder in the Netherlands.
