= Pieter Langendijk =

Dutch writer and poet (1683–1756)

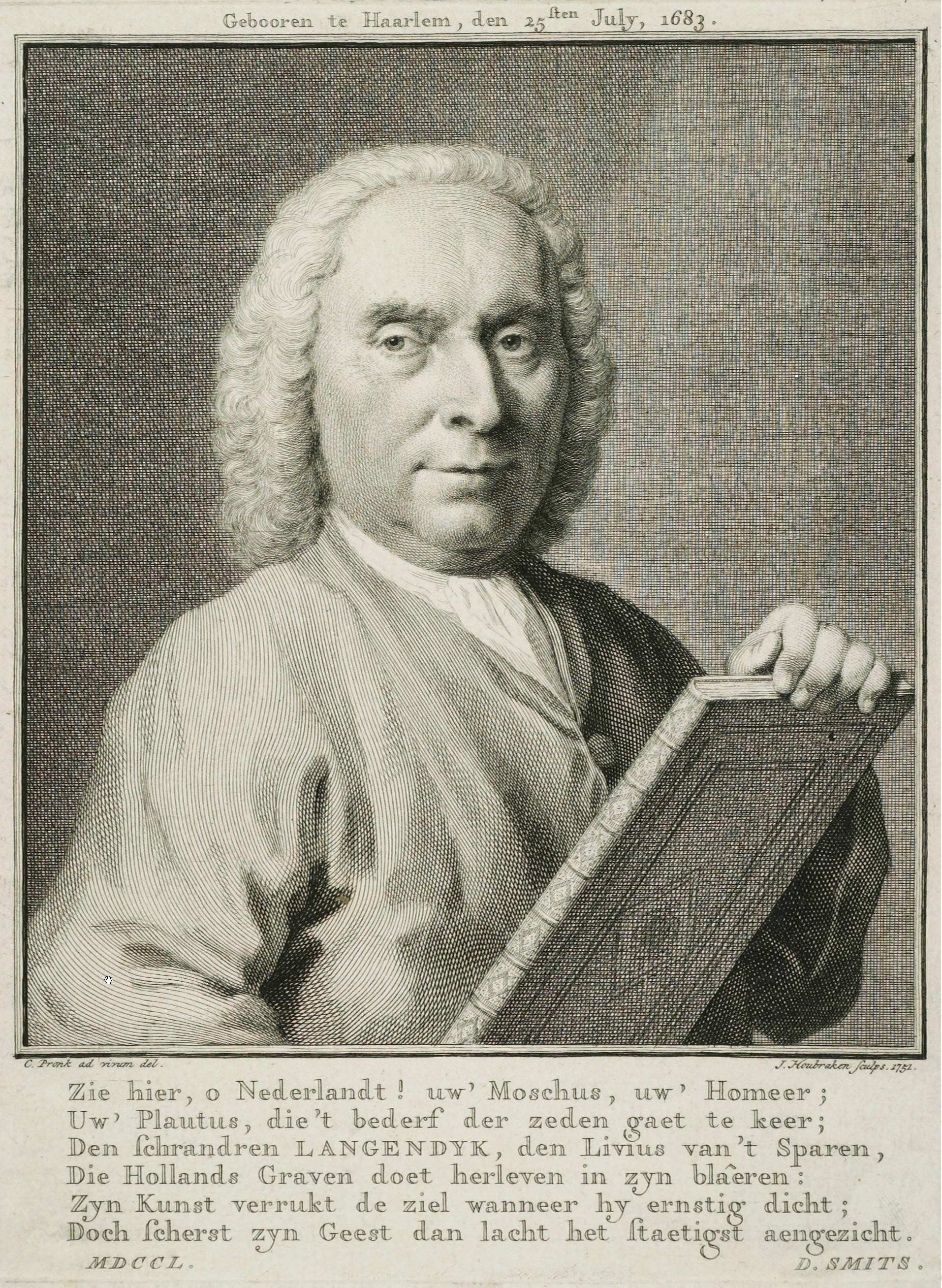
Pieter Langendijk.

Pieter Langendijk (Haarlem, 25 July 1683 – Haarlem, 9 or 18 July 1756) was a damask weaver, city artist, dramatist, and poet.

== Life ==
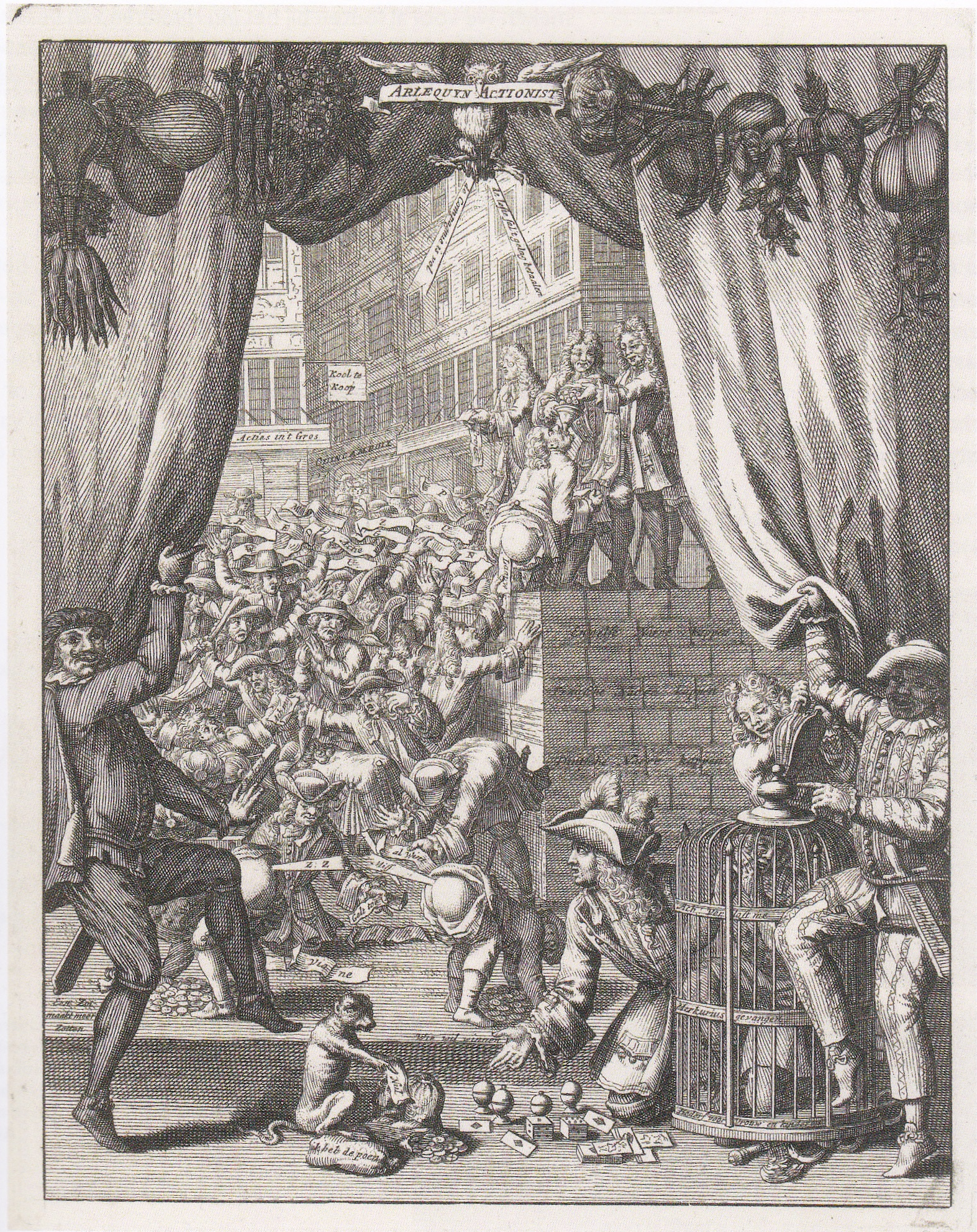
Arlequyn Actionist (1720), a mockery of stockjobbery

Pieter was the son of Arend Kort, a mason born in Langedijk. His father died in 1689 so he temporarily came under the protection of the Amsterdam poet William Sewell. In 1695, they moved to The Hague and his mother began a linen business. Pieter became a weaver and pattern draughtsman and joined artist circles, where he began to write poetry.

Around 1708 Pieter took a course in drawing and painting with Frans van Steenwijk. On his 28th birthday his Don Quichot op de Bruiloft van Kamacho appeared. It proved a success and began a permanent run at the Schouwberg of Van Campen. The farces De zwetser and The mutual marriage-deception appeared the next year.

Pieter wrote yet more comedies in the style of Molière, who he also translated and wrote about. With Hermanus Angelkot, he wrote Cato, dedicated to the mayor Nicolaes Witsen. Quincampoix, or the gamblers on the Stock Exchange became very famous, written in the notorious year 1720 that John Law ruined many investors in Paris. Arlequin Actionist was a commedia dell'arte farce on the stockjobbery, one act long, with a real fight, dance and music.

In 1721, he became "Factor" of the Haarlem Society Trou Moet Blycken and he moved back to Haarlem with his mother in 1722. In the same year he was appointed as city-artist to Haarlem, and wrote yearly poems for the city from 1724-1744. He had a house outside the city, while he could still get out the city. After his mother died in 1727, he married a sickly and moody woman who died eleven years later. In 1747, he had to sell a large part of its books and possessions. Pieter lived in Haarlem's Proveniershuis, where he was given free accommodation in return for writing a history of the city. The previous description of the city was from 1628, written by Samuel Ampzing. On his sickbed he wanted to be baptized at home, and "only five days did Pieter survive after this religious performance..."

== Works ==
Pieter wrote five pieces of comparable length, in which symmetry played a role. With exposition, intrigue and crisis, he respected the unities of time, place and action, using this classicist form to hold a mirror up to the bourgeoisie. Nowhere did the tone become moralizing, but was more a "comedy of manners" (comédies des moeurs), showing the hypocrisy of those in the higher positions (i.e., the higher bourgeoisie or the impoverished middle-classes). Pieter wrote only a single tragedy, at the end of his life.

=== Het wederzijds huwelijksbedrog (The Mutual Marriage Deception) ===
In this comedy, Lodewijk meets Charlotte. Lodewijk is an aristocrat, in great financial difficulties but acting as if he is a rich Polish count. He has a friend called Jan, who proposes to act out one of his barons, so to flirt with the maid of Charlotte: Klaartje. Jan served under Karel in the army, but left as a traitor. Charlotte also comes from the impoverished aristocracy, and acts as if her situation is more prosperous as well. It is very comical to see how both sides try to convince the other that they are extremely wealthy. This 'mutual marriage deception' comes to light when Karel, the brother of Charlotte, unmasks everybody at the theatre. Charlotte and Lodewijk get married anyway, because they have fallen in love with each other. As for Klaartje and Jan, she is disgusted with Jan for lying to her, so she breaks up with him. After that, she tries to get back with her former lover, Hans (who she broke up with when Jan started flirting with her) but he wants nothing of her. In the end, the traitor Jan takes flight from the group, as to avoid punishment from his captain: Karel.

=== De spiegel der vaderlandse kooplieden (The Mirror of Dutch Merchants) ===
This work also holds up a mirror to the audience. Two generations are placed opposite each other: those born in the 17th and 18th centuries. Ernst and Hendrik are conscientious seventeenth-century merchants who, through hard work, gain position. Their sons represent the following, 18th century generations, and are called Lichthart (light heart), husband to Kwistgoed, and Losbol (loose-liver), husband of Zoetje. They waste all the money that their fathers have made and the whole family fortune is lost.

=== De Graaven van Holland, in jaardichten beschreven ===
Bundle of his yearly poems for the city of Haarlem, which formed a series on the Counts of Holland, were compiled with engravings by his nephew Hendrik Spilman in 1745.

His work on the history of Haarlem was never published, but his manuscript was used by Gerrit Willem van Oosten de Bruyn in 1765.

== Works ==
- Spiegel der Vaderlandsche Kooplieden door Pieter Langendijk. Waar agter gevoegd is het Leeven van den Dichter. Uitgegeven met inleiding en aantekeningen door dr. G.A. van Es, (1979)
