= Cornelis Pronk =

Dutch painter

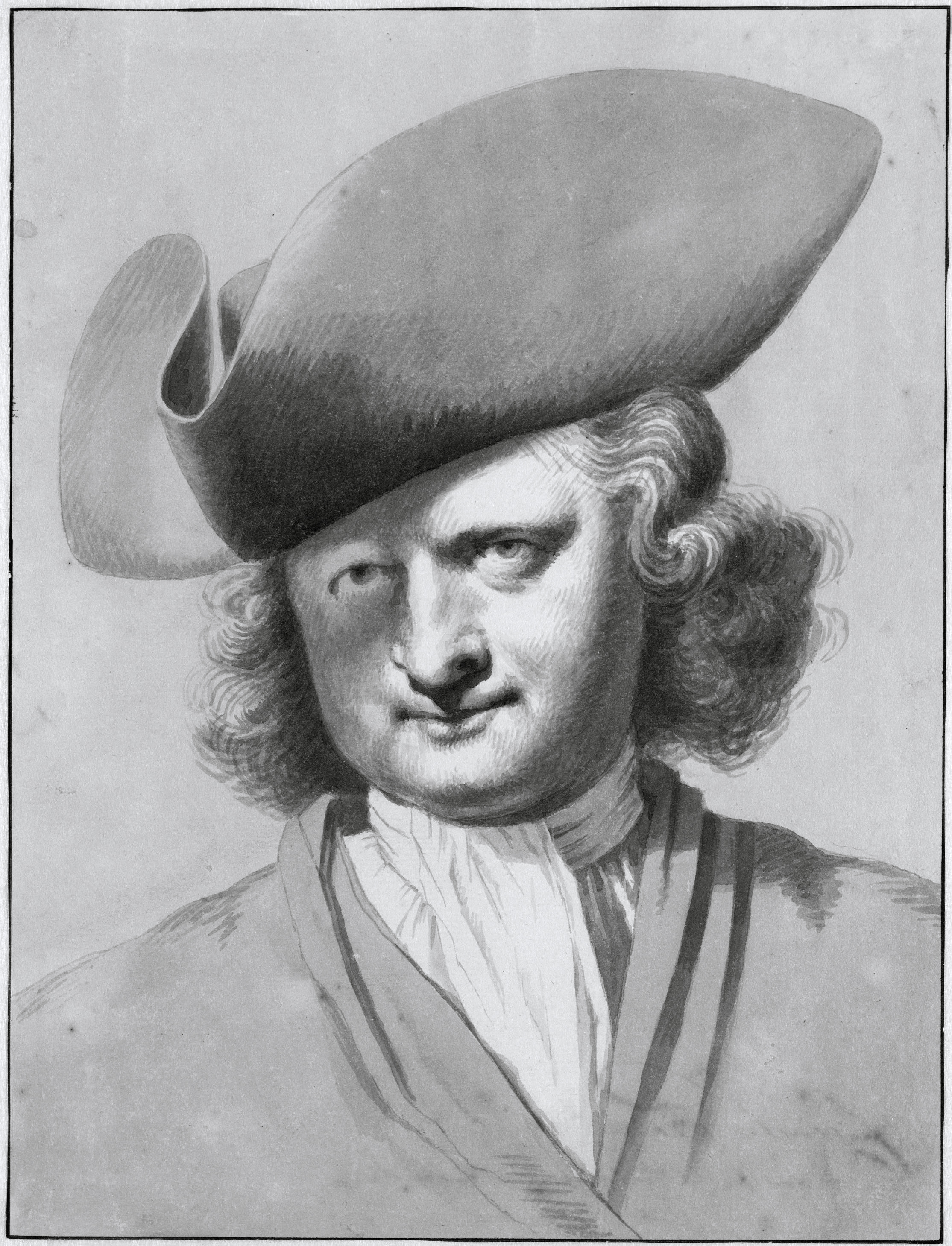
- Self-portrait
- Born: 10 December 1691; Amsterdam
- Died: 28 or 29 September 1759; Amsterdam
- Education: apprentice of Jan van Houten and Arnold Boonen
- Known for: drawing, painting

Cornelis Pronk (10 December 1691 – 28 or 29 September 1759), also known as Cornelis Pronck, was a Dutch draughtsman, painter and porcelain designer. He is known particularly for his numerous drawings of cities, towns and buildings (so-called topographical drawings), as well as for his porcelain designs.

== Work ==
For many years, Pronk toured the Dutch Republic in summer, usually on foot, to sketch views of cities, towns, and landscapes, as well as castles, stately homes and other buildings, documenting in detail when and where each sketch was made. Each of these field sketches would form the basis for one or several drawings, which he produced back in his studio. On his travels, he would occasionally cross the border into Germany, as he did in 1729 for instance, when he made drawings around Kleve and Cologne.

Together with his pupils Jan de Beijer (1703–c.1780) and Abraham de Haen (1707–1748), he produced over 700 drawings for Het verheerlykt Nederland ("The glorified Netherlands"), a multi-volume work published in 1745-1774 documenting all the provinces of the Dutch Republic. Many of his drawings were turned into engravings by other artists such as Hendrik Spilman and Simon Fokke. Pronk also contributing drawings to a 1760 atlas of the province of Zeeland, Een en twintig gezigten der stemmende steden van Zeeland en derzelver voorname gebouwen.

Pronk's drawing technique developed rapidly in the period 1727 to 1731. He began to use subtle lighting and shadow effects and also added numerous anecdotal details to his drawings. Thereby the drawings attained not only documentary but also artistic value. Pronk's drawings are characterized by clear, simple lines that captured the essence of the buildings he depicted. He knew how to leave out details that would have crowded the drawings.

His pupil and close friend Abraham de Haen wrote numerous poems in his honour. Pronk also dabbled in poetry himself.

Four of Pronk's sketchbooks are in the collection of the Rijksprentenkabinet (National Cabinet of Prints), now part of the Rijksmuseum in Amsterdam. In 1997, the Frans Hals Museum in Haarlem held an exhibition of Pronk's work.

=== Porcelain ===
In 1734, the Dutch East India Company commissioned Pronk to produce designs for a set of china plates. This porcelain (so-called chine de commande) was produced in China, then shipped to Europe and sold there at an extremely high price. A set of blue-white plates, for instance, would sell for 1160 Dutch guilders – enough to buy a house in Amsterdam. Pronk made four different designs, of which "The Parasol Ladies" was most popular. The Dutch East India Company ended the deal in 1740 because the production and shipping from China proved too costly. However, Pronk's designs remained popular and were frequently copied, and some of his designs are still being produced.

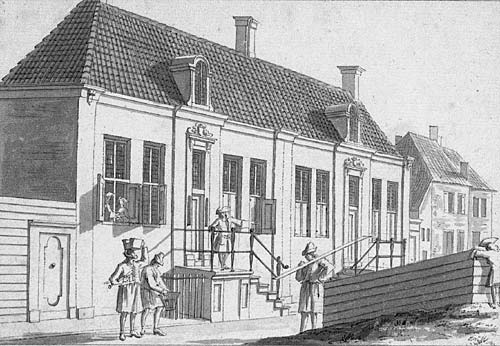
Oostindische werf, Enkhuizen, 1727

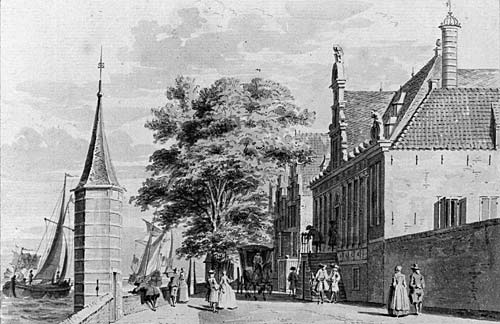
Oostindisch huis, Enkhuizen, 1729

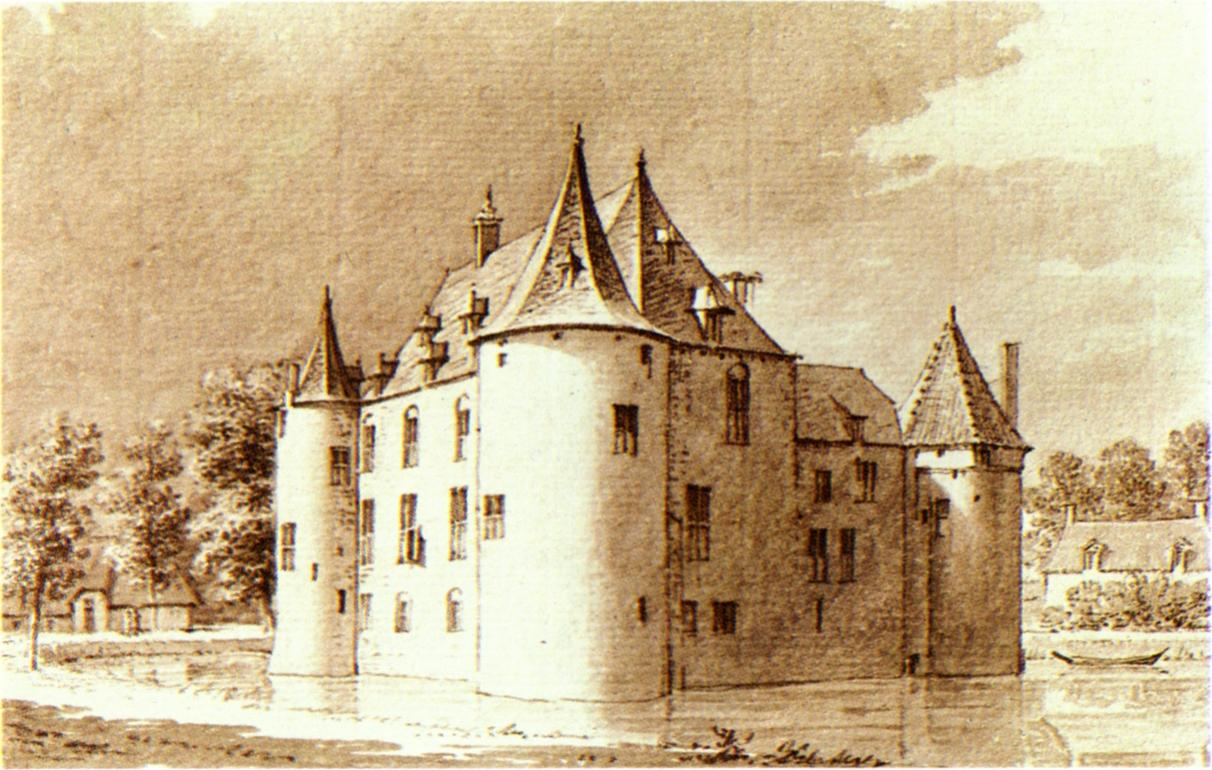
Castle Ammersoyen, c. 1730

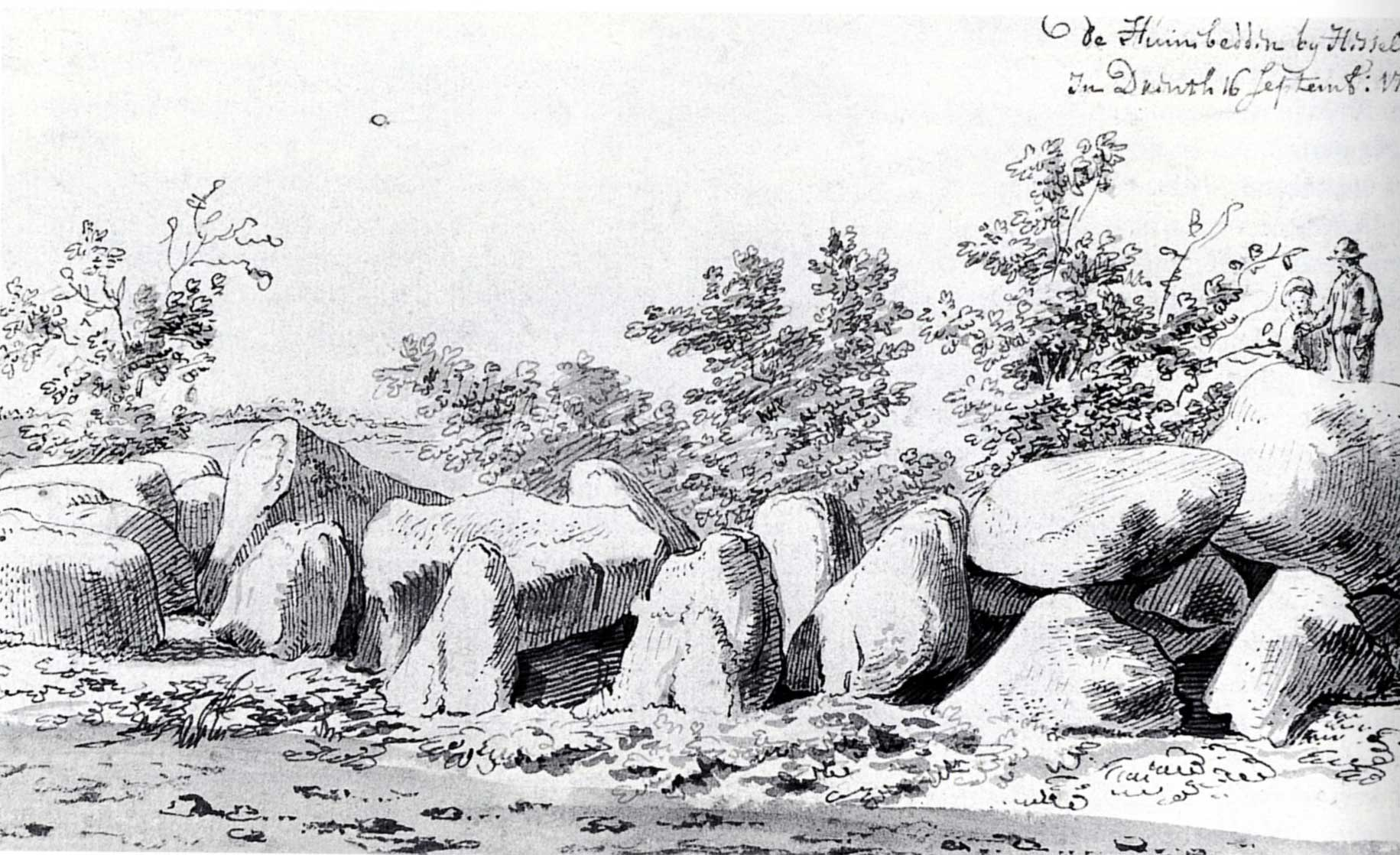
Hunebed van Havelte, 1737

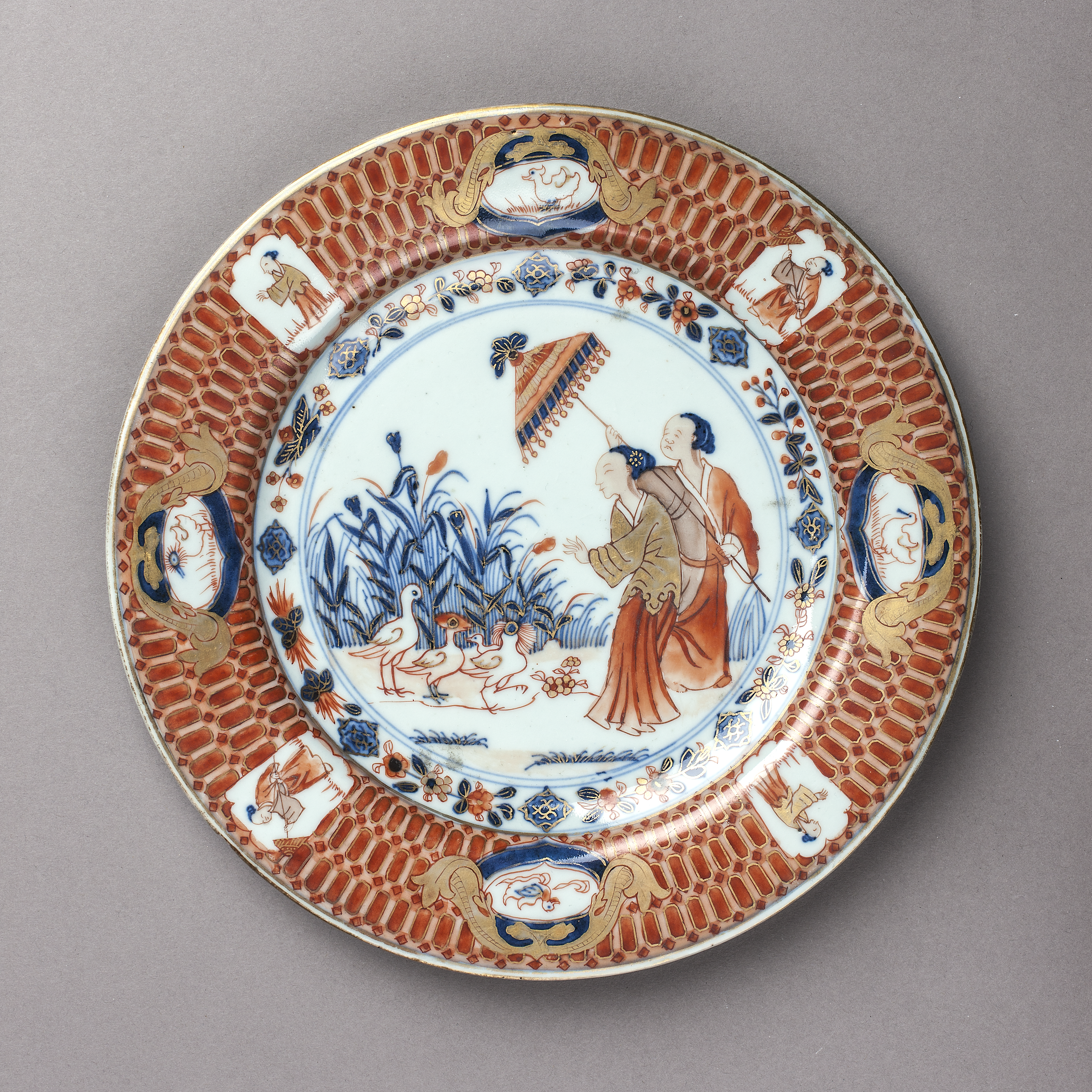
Two ladies with a parasol, 1770–1775 – Hallwyl Museum

== Life and career ==
Pronk was the son of an Amsterdam wheat merchant who later opened an administration office. After working in his father's office for several years, Pronk (on the advice of the scholar and art connoisseur Lambert ten Kate) started to take lessons in drawing and painting from the painter Jan van Houten (1679–1713). In between 1712 and 1715, he also studied with the portrait painter Arnold Boonen (1669–1729).

In 1715 he established himself as a painter in his own right, joining the Saint Lucas guild of painters. Early in his career he was primarily a portrait painter and a copyist of 17th-century Dutch masters. He was also known as a painter of theatre sets. He initially worked in Alkmaar but later settled in Amsterdam. From about 1722 he focused mainly on "topographical" drawings, to be used as illustrations for atlases, although he also remained active as a portrait painter. The drawings were almost exclusively commissioned by wealthy Amsterdam patricians, particularly the textile merchant and amateur historian Andries Schoemaker (1660–1735) and his son Gerrit Schoemaker (1692–1736), who would sometimes accompany him on his travels.

Pronk was a Mennonite who was baptised at the relatively young age of 23. He remained unmarried, possibly because within his congregation it was not allowed to marry non-Mennonites and few women within that community were available for marriage.
