= Abraham de Haen =

Dutch draughtsman and engraver

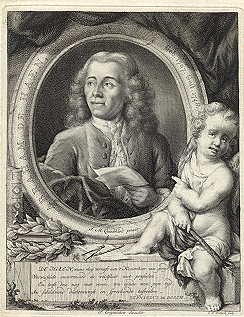
- Portrait by Jan Maurits Quinkhard (1771) Rijksmuseum Amsterdam
- Born: 6 April 1707; Amsterdam
- Died: 8 August 1748 (aged 41); Amsterdam
- Education: apprentice of Cornelis Pronk
- Known for: drawing, engraving, painting, poetry

Abraham de Haen (6 April 1707 in Amsterdam – 8 August 1748 in Amsterdam), also known as Abraham de Haan, was a Dutch draughtsman and engraver known particularly for his drawings of castles and manors. He was also a painter and poet.

He referred to himself as Abraham de Haen de Jongere (Abraham de Haen the Younger) to distinguish himself from his father, who was also called Abraham. This name also distinguishes him from the 17th-century painter Abraham de Haen the Elder.

== Life and work ==
Abraham de Haen was born in Amsterdam in 1707 into a Dutch Reformed family as the first of two children; his younger sister Anna was born a year later. His parents were Abraham de Haen (1779-1747) and Anna Preyger (±1684-1727). De Haen's father worked as a wheat buyer and later became a bookkeeper.

At a young age, De Haen studied French, Latin and law. He was already active as an artist and poet in his teenage years. At the early age of 15, he produced drawings of the manor and church at Zuilichem and the castle at Wijk bij Duurstede. He published his first poem in 1723, at the age of 16.

In 1728 he became an apprentice of the draughtsman Cornelis Pronk. The two developed a close friendship, and De Haen wrote numerous poems in honour of Pronk. They also worked closely together as draughtsmen. De Haen frequently accompanied Pronk on his travels through the Dutch countryside to sketch towns and buildings. Their first such journey together was in 1729. They also traveled through the German Rhineland. The two were regularly accompanied by their patron, the textile merchant and amateur historian Andries Schoemaker. Together with another pupil of Pronk's, Jan de Beijer, De Haen and Pronk produced over 700 drawings for Het verheerlykt Nederland ("The glorified Netherlands"), a multivolume work published in 1745-1774 documenting all the provinces of the Dutch Republic.

As a poet, De Haen was known particularly for his pastoral poetry. Much of his poetry was published posthumously in De Herderszangen en Mengeldichten van Abraham de Haen. This volume was published in 1751 by the poet Sara Maria van de Wilp, a niece of De Haen's. The book also contains a biography of De Haen by Theodorus Crajenschot, as well as a portrait of De Haen from an engraving by Christian Friedrich Fritsch (based on an original by Jan Maurits Quinkhard), and odes to the De Haen penned by other poets. De Haen also contributed poems to Dichtkundige Lauwerbladen, gestrooid voor zyne doorluchtige hoogheid Willem Karel Hendrik Friso, a series of books in poetry form published 1747-1750 that described recent events, particularly the appointment in 1747 of William IV, Prince of Orange as stadtholder.

De Haen was an amateur historian. He frequently searched manors and castles for old documents and other curiosities.

Abraham de Haen married the noblewoman Katherina van Hoek in Amsterdam on 21 August 1725; Pieter Langendijk composed a poem for the event. De Haen died on 8 August 1748, at the age of 41, just one year after the death of his father, and was buried on 13 August at the Leidse Kerkhof cemetery (now Raamplein square) in Amsterdam. The records stated his place of residence as the Leidsegracht canal, near the corner with Leidsedwarsstraat.

The Rijksmuseum in Amsterdam has a sketchbook and a number of drawings by De Haen. The museum also has a 1771 portrait of De Haen painted by Jan Maurits Quinkhard.

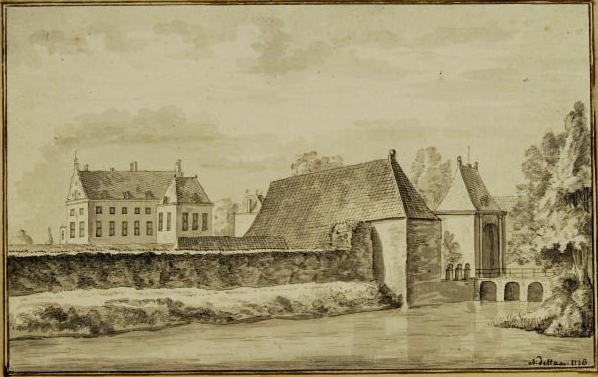
Huis Dorth, 1726

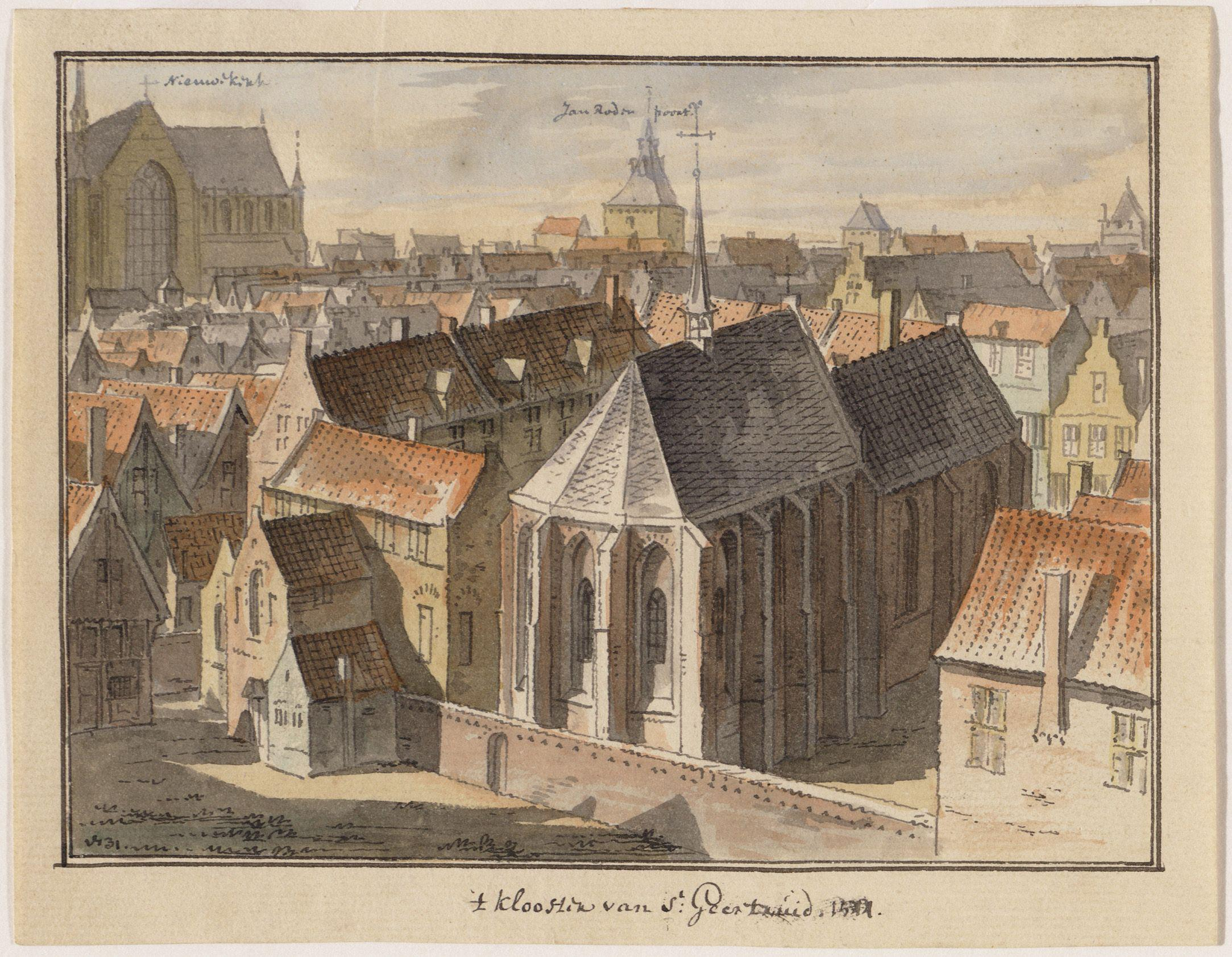
't Klooster St. Geertruid, 1544, 1731

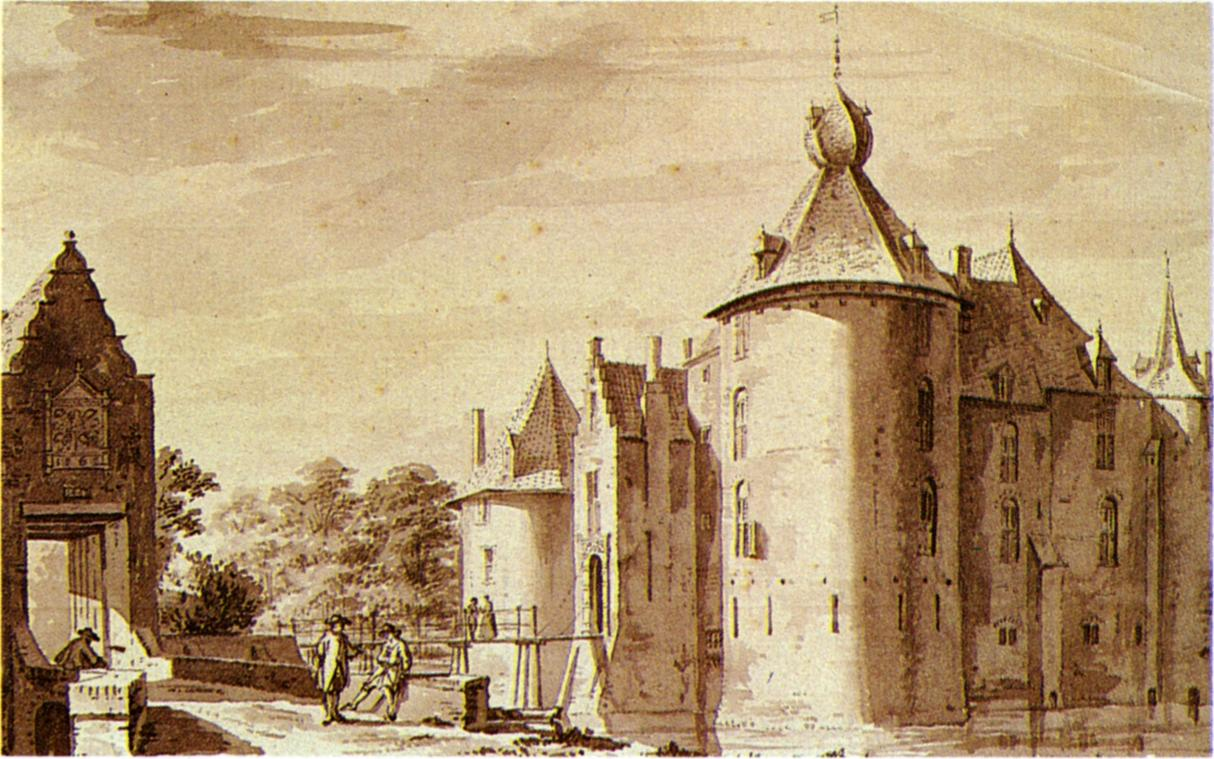
Kasteel Ammersoyen, 1734

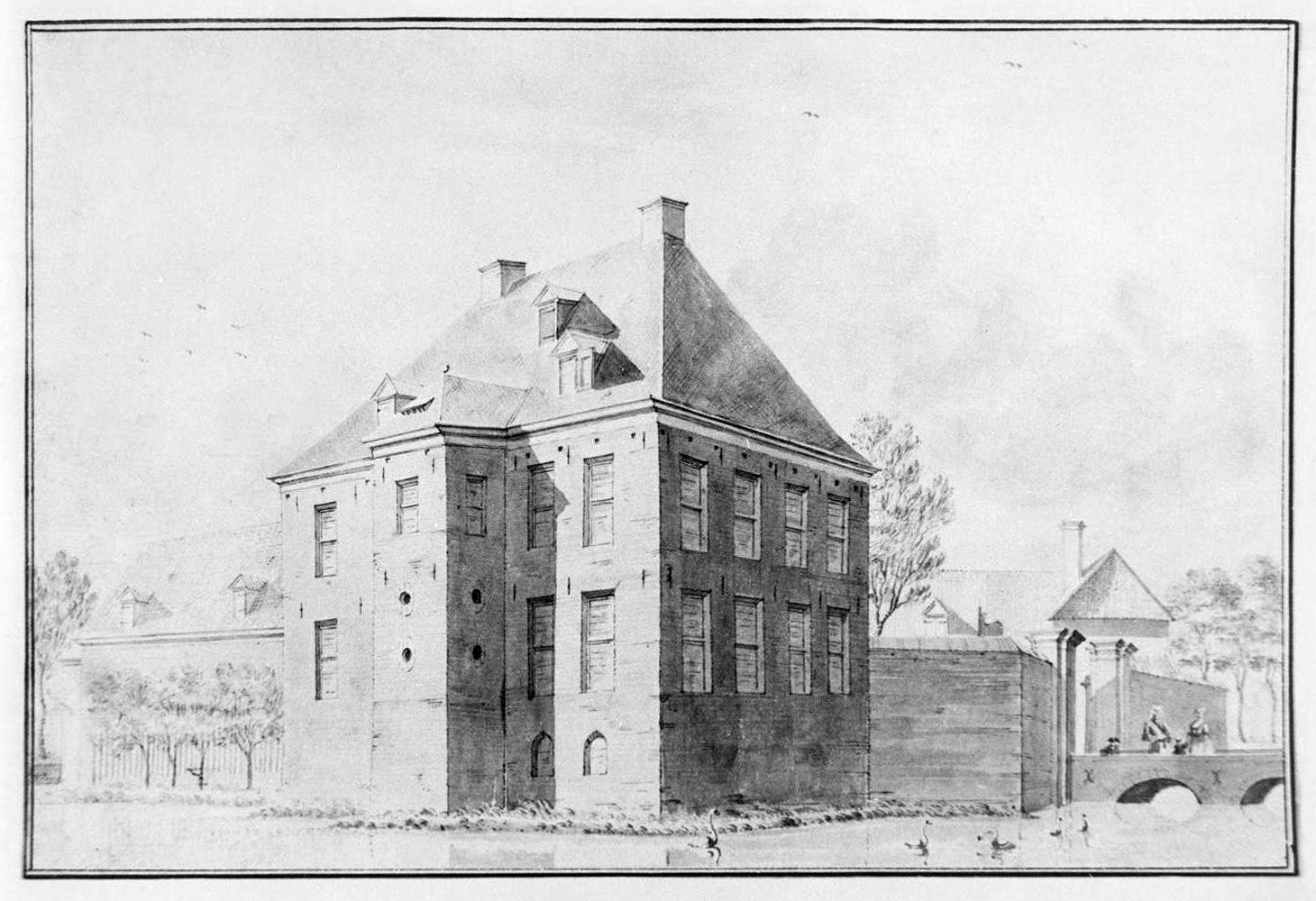
Kasteel de Kolck, second half of the 18th Century
