= Jan Maurits Quinkhard =

Dutch painter

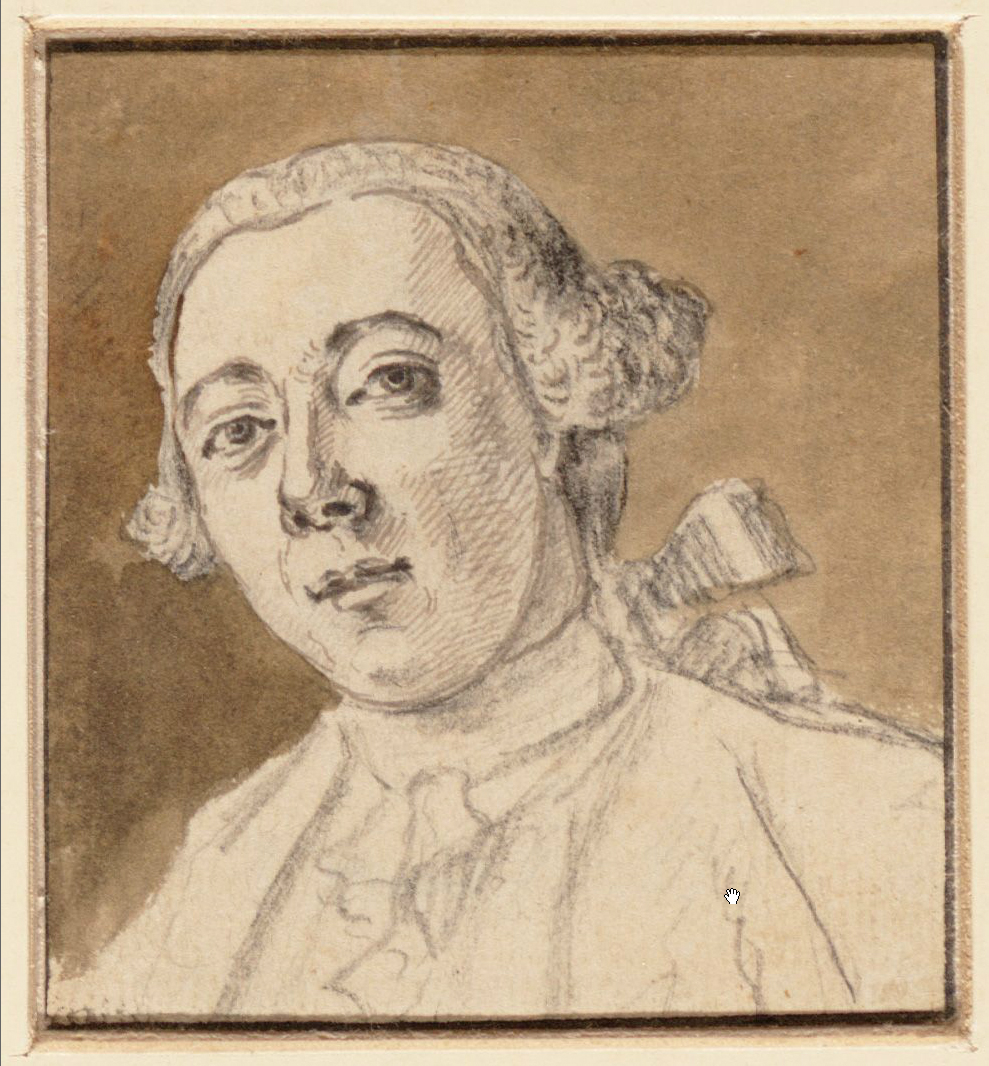
Jan Maurits Quinkhardt (Reinier Vinkeles, 1764)

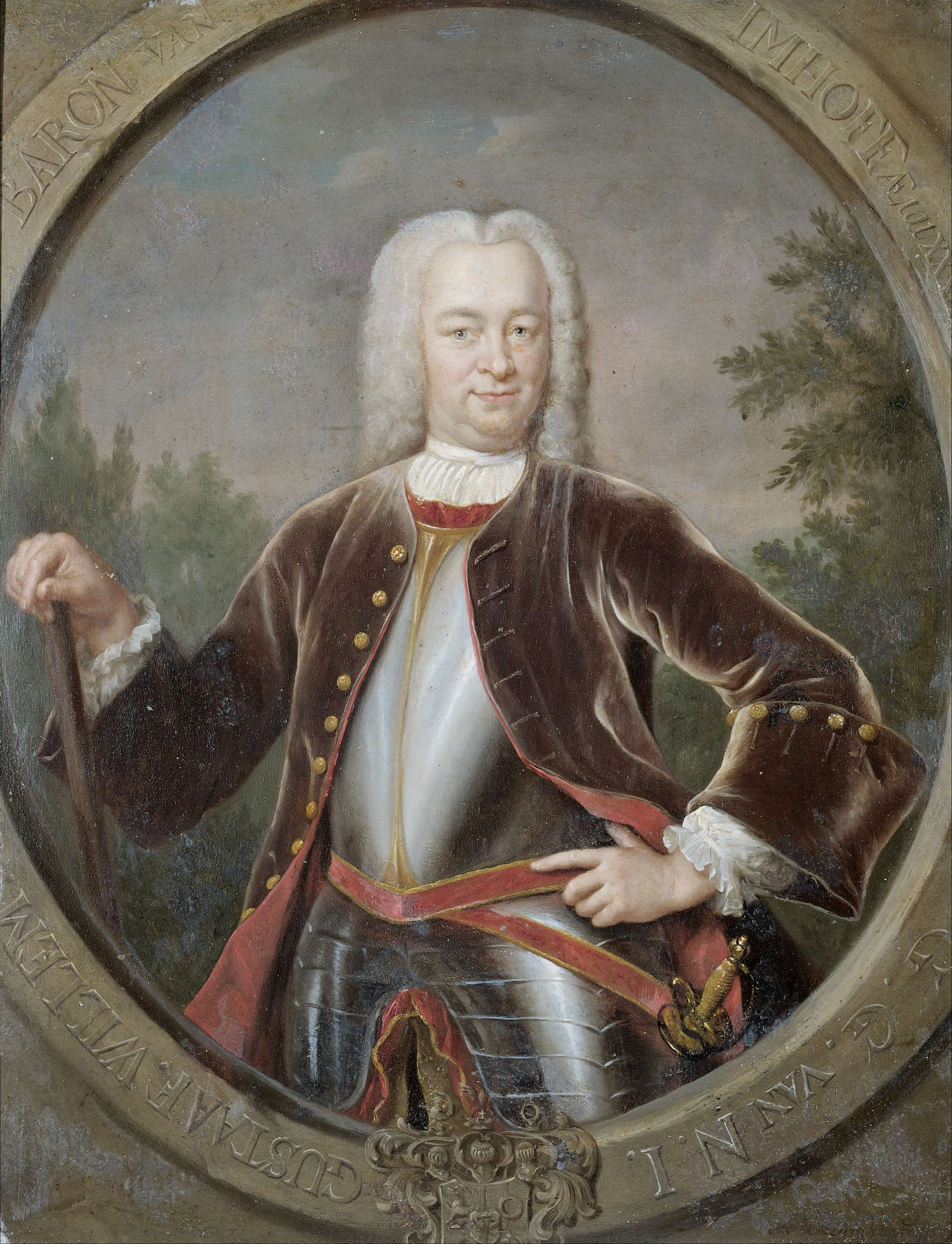
Half-length portrait of Gustaaf Willem Baron van Imhoff (1705–1750), Governor from 1743 to 1750, from a collection of portraits of governors of the former Dutch East Indies (now Indonesia) owned by the Rijksmuseum Amsterdam.

Jan Maurits Quinkhard (28 January 1688 – 11 November 1772) was an 18th-century painter and print designer from the Dutch Republic.

== Biography ==
Quinkhard was born in the town of Rees, near Cleves. He was a Dutch painter and scholar of his father, the painter Julius Quinkhardt the Elder, Arnold van Boonen, Christoffel Lubinietski, and Nikolaas Verkolje.

He painted familiar, allegorical, and mythological subjects, and was excellent in portraits, of which he painted a great number. Five good examples are in the Amsterdam Museum.

His son Julius (1736–1776) was instructed by his father, but abandoned art for commerce. Two pictures by him are in the Amsterdam Museum. He also collaborated with Jacobus Houbraken and other leading engravers on prints of the rich and famous of Amsterdam.

His pupils were:

- Jurriaan Andriessen
- Jan de Beijer
- Tibout Regters
- Adriaan Schregardus
- Jan Stolker
- Jan Gerard Waldorp.

He died, aged 84, in Amsterdam.
