= Jan de Beijer =

Dutch painter

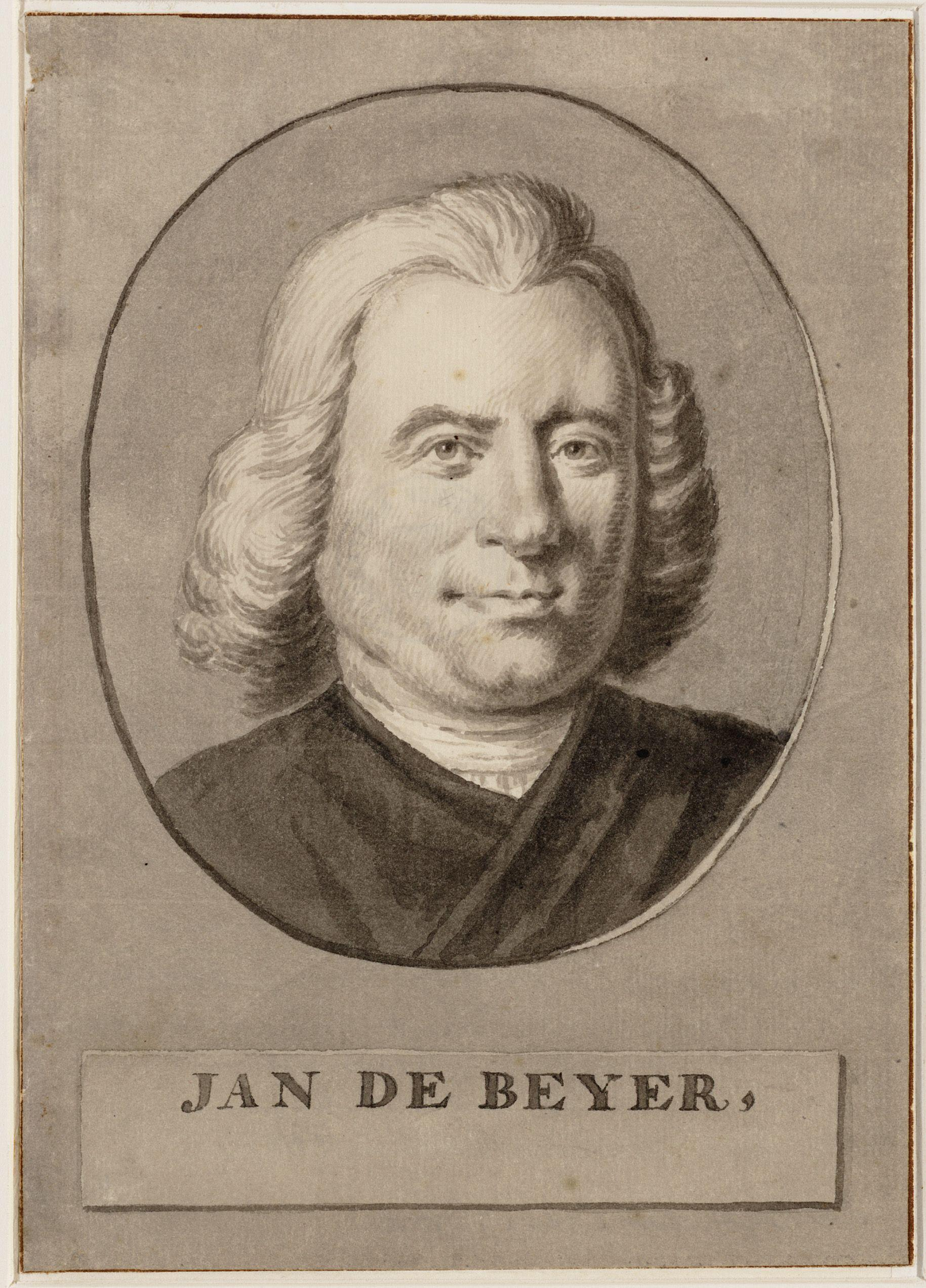
- Portrait of Jan de Beijer by Cornelis van Noorde
- Born: 24 September 1703; Aarau, Switzerland
- Died: c. 1780 near Kleve (present-day Germany)
- Education: apprentice of Cornelis Pronk and Jan Maurits Quinkhard
- Known for: drawing, painting

Jan de Beijer (24 September 1703 – c. 1780), also given as Jan de Beyer, was a Dutch draughtsman and painter known for this drawings of towns and buildings in the present-day countries of the Netherlands, Belgium and Germany. In total, he produced some 1500 drawings, over 600 of which were reproduced as engravings by other artists.

De Beijer travelled through the Netherlands in summertime to draw views of cities and towns as well as castles and other buildings. In the wintertime, he would retire to his home to produce colour drawings based on his sketches in the field, as well as drawings that could be used by other artists to produce engravings.

Drawings by Jan de Beijer and engravings based on his work can be found in numerous museums, archives, and private collections. In Amsterdam, the Joods Historisch Museum has a 1765 drawing of the Grote Synagoge and Nieuwe Synagoge, two of the synagogues making up the complex that now houses the museum. Also, the Amsterdam Museum has a drawing of the now-demolished tower Haringpakkerstoren.

In 1999, the Historisch Museum Arnhem in Arnhem devoted an exhibition to work by Jan de Beijer.

== Life ==
Jan de Beijer was born in Switzerland to Johan Jacob de Beijer (1654–1719) and his wife Maria Barbara Huisch. His father was a Dutch officer who was in Switzerland to hire mercenaries for the army of the Dutch Republic. At the age of six, he moved with his parents to Emmerich on the Dutch-German border.

Around 1722 he moved to Amsterdam to study with Cornelis Pronk, who was considered the most important topographical draughtsman of his time. De Beijer lived for some years in Vierlingsbeek, near Boxmeer. Sometime after 1750 he returned to Amsterdam, where he received further instruction from Jan Maurits Quinkhard who, like Pronk, had been a pupil of Arnold Boonen. In Amsterdam, he founded a draughtsmen's society. He was active as an artist until 1769 and then retired to a small town near Kleve on the Dutch-German border, where he died. According to some sources he died on 15 February 1780 in Emmerich, although Doesburg is also mentioned as his place of death.

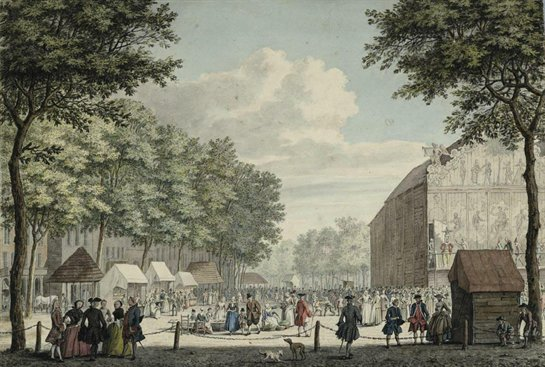
Het Vredenburg in Utrecht, 1760

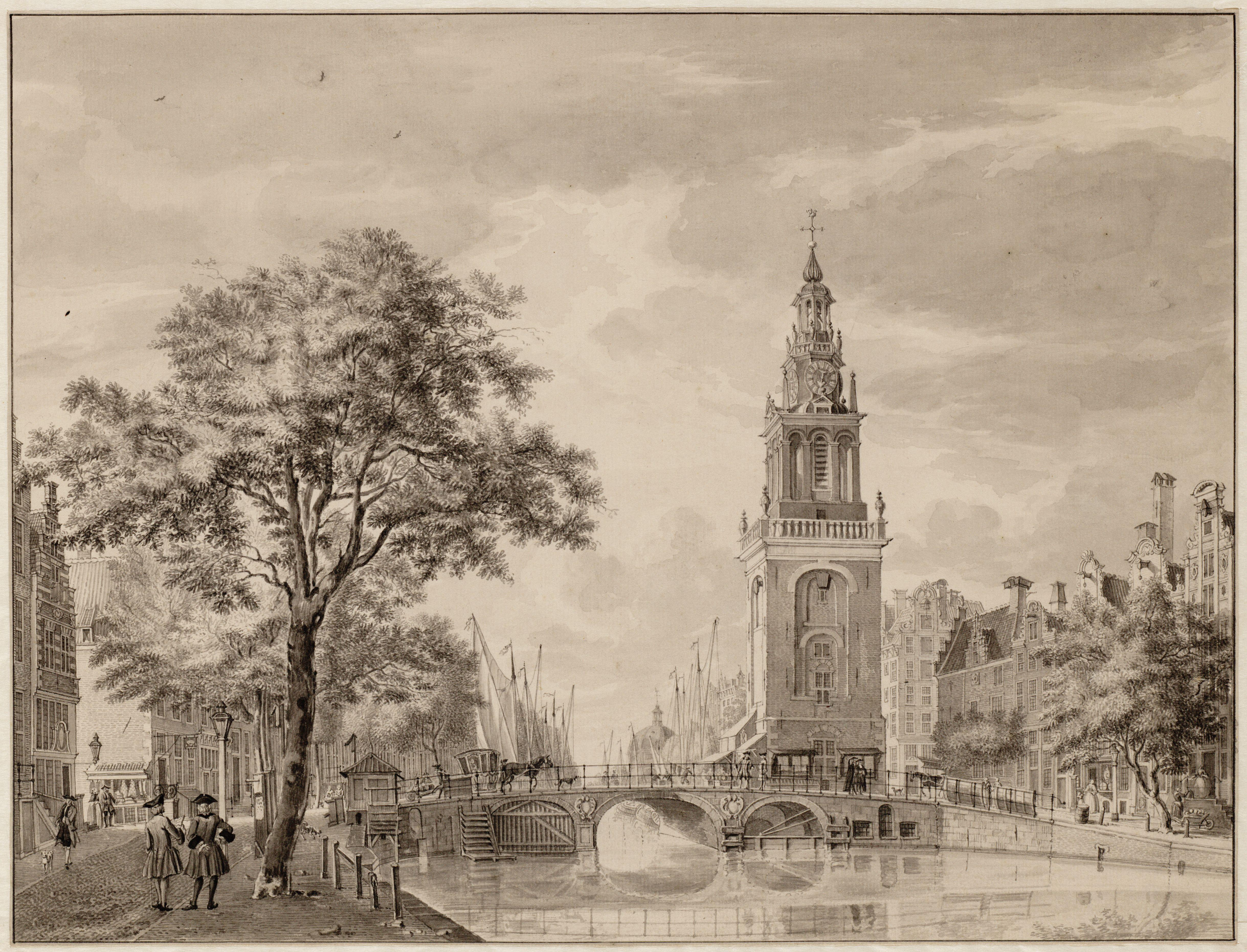
Torensluis en Jan Rodenpoortstoren in Amsterdam, 1760–1767

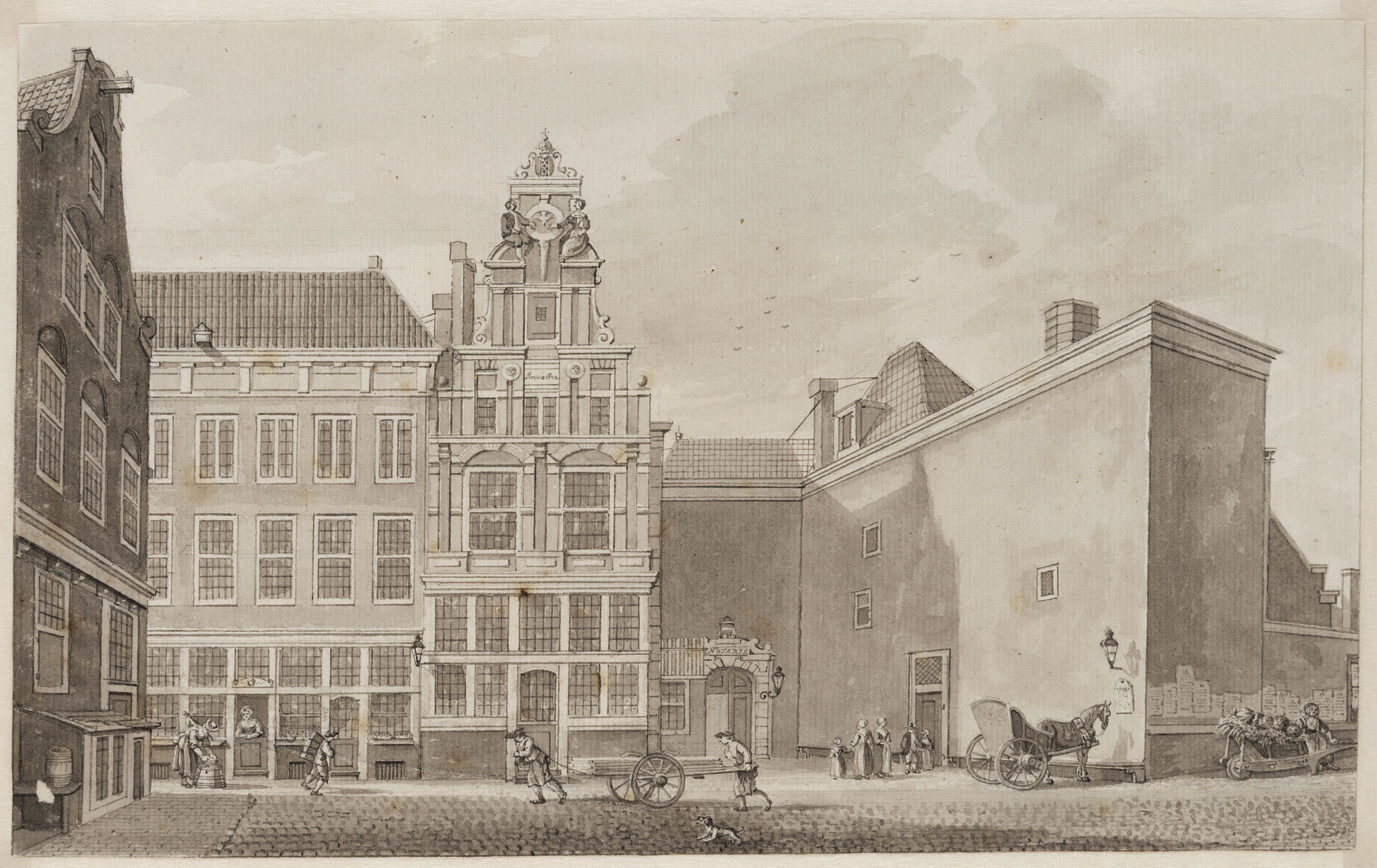
Het Burgerweeshuis in Amsterdam, 1770.

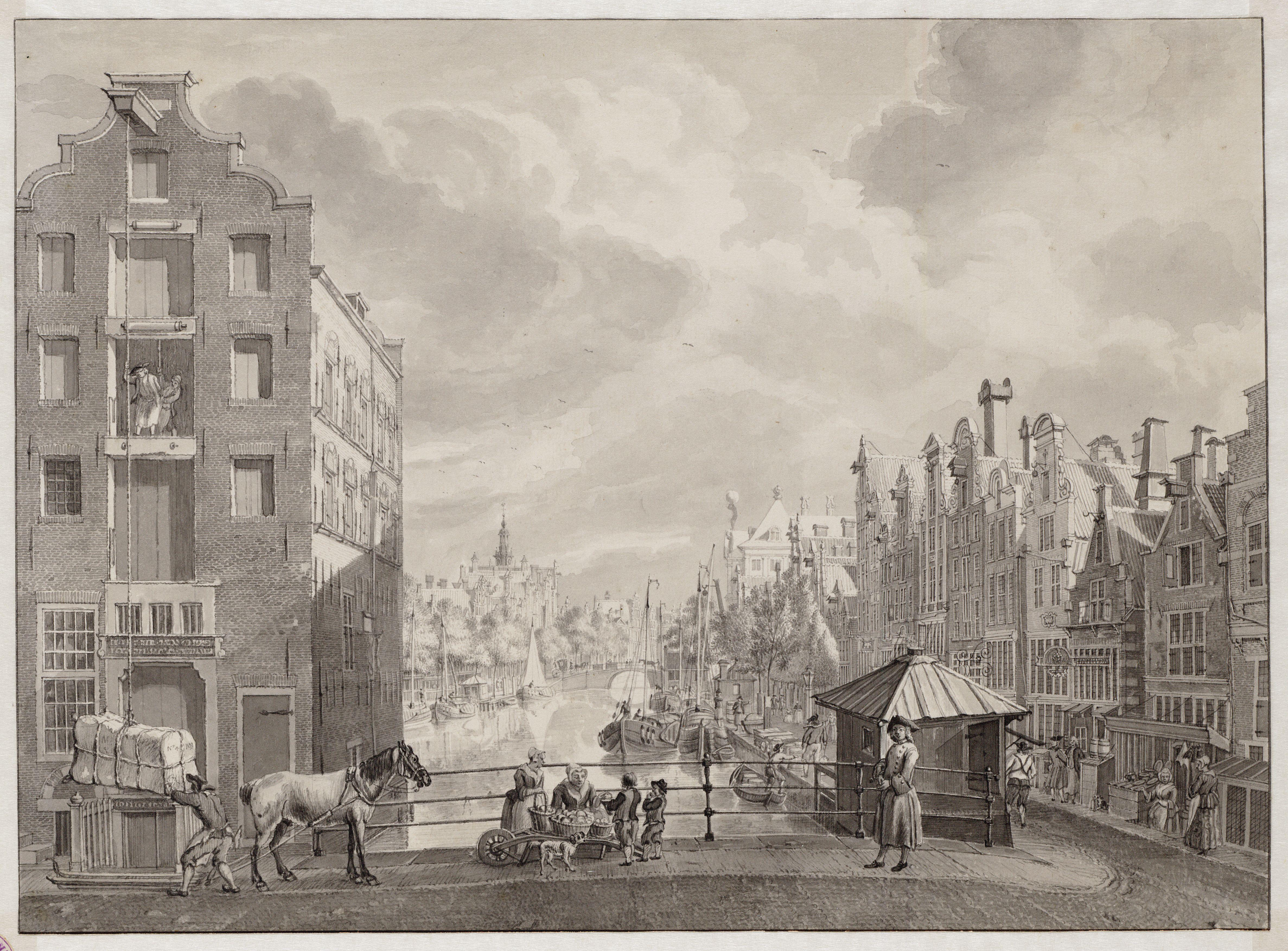
Nieuwezijds Voorburgwal in Amsterdam, 1775.
