= List of wars of succession in Europe =

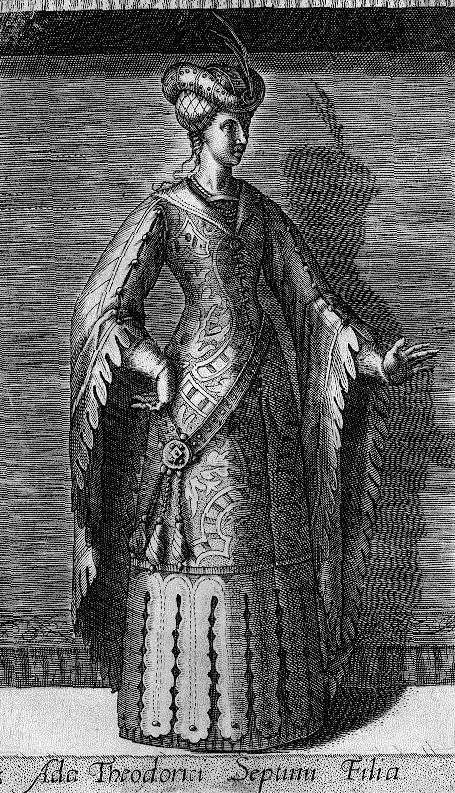
To inherit Holland, Ada quickly married Louis before her father was buried, triggering the Loon War.

This is a list of wars of succession in Europe.

Note: Wars of succession in transcontinental states are mentioned under the continents where their capital city was located. That means that wars of succession in the Byzantine Empire and Ottoman Empire are found here whenever their capital city was located at Constantinople/Kostantiniyye/Istanbul in East Thrace; for Ottoman wars of succession before 1453, see List of wars of succession § Medieval Asia. Names of wars that have been given names by historians are capitalised; the others, whose existence has been proven but not yet given a specific name, are provisionally written in lowercase letters (except for the first word, geographical and personal names).

== Ancient Europe ==
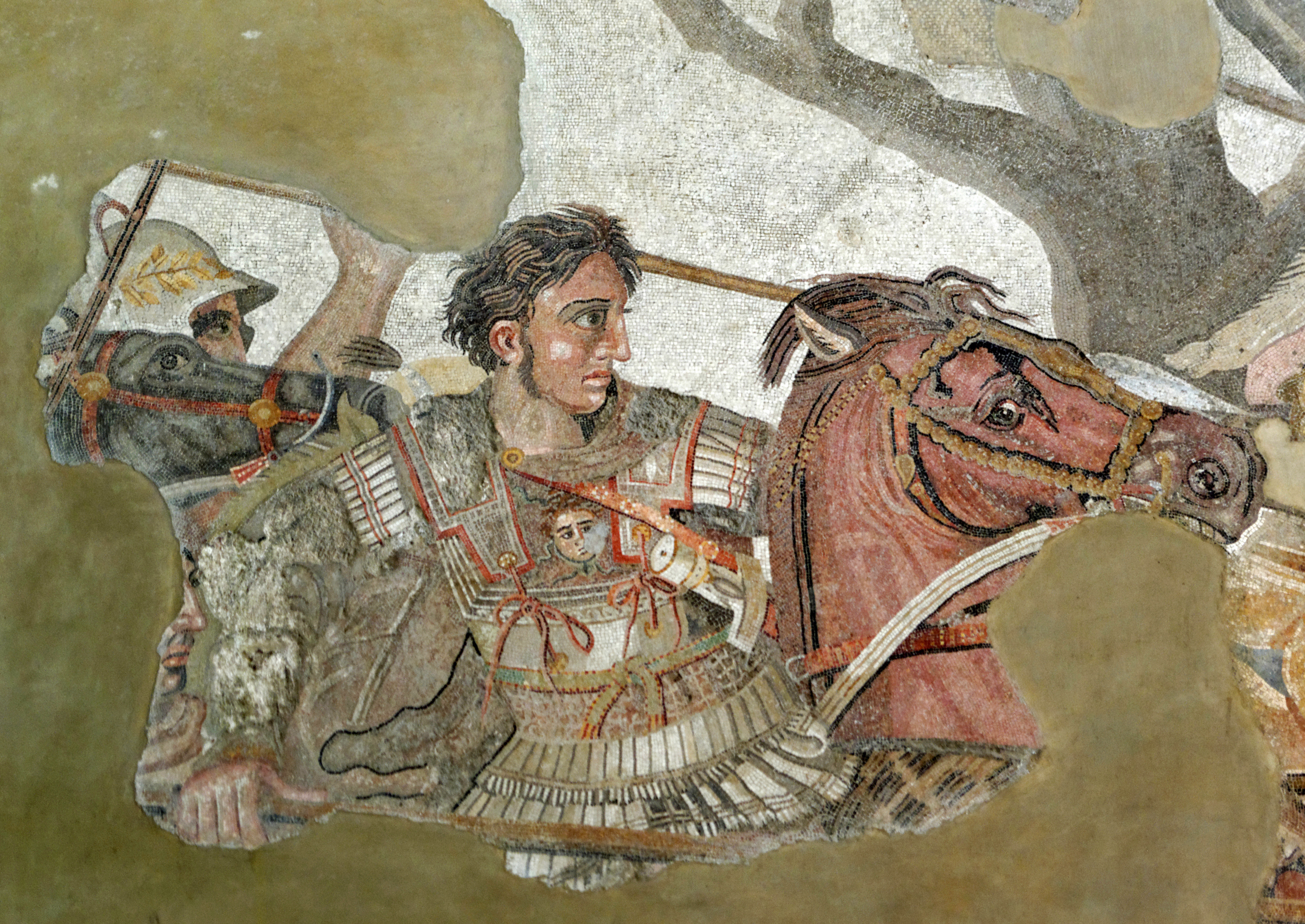
Alexander's diadochi battled about his political legacy for 46 years.

- Macedonian war of succession (393–392 BCE), after the death of king Pausanias of Macedon, between Amyntas III and Argaeus II
- Macedonian war of succession (369–368 BCE), after the death of king Amyntas III of Macedon, between Ptolemy of Aloros and Alexander II of Macedon
- Macedonian war of succession (360–359 BCE), after the death of king Perdiccas III of Macedon, between Philip II (who deposed Amyntas IV), Argeus (supported by Athens), Pausanias (supported by Thrace) and Archelaus (supported by the Chalcidian League)
- Thracian war of succession (c. 352–347 BCE), after the death of co-king Berisades of Thrace (Odrysian kingdom), between Cetriporis and his brothers against their uncle Cersobleptes
- Wars of the Diadochi or Wars of Alexander's Successors (323–277 BCE), after the death of king Alexander the Great of Macedon
  - First War of the Diadochi (322–320 BCE), after regent Perdiccas tried to marry Alexander the Great's sister Cleopatra of Macedon and thus claim the throne
  - Second War of the Diadochi (318–315 BCE), after the death of regent Antipater, whose succession was disputed between Polyperchon (Antipater's appointed successor) and Cassander (Antipater's son)
    - Epirote war of succession (316–297 BCE), after the deposition of king Aeacides of Epirus during his intervention in the Second War of the Diadochi until the second enthronement of his son Pyrrhus of Epirus and the death of usurper Neoptolemus II of Epirus
  - Third War of the Diadochi (314–311 BCE), after the diadochs conspired against Antigonus I Monophthalmus and Polyperchon
  - Fourth War of the Diadochi (308/6–301 BCE), resumption of the Third. During this war, regent Antigonus and his son Demetrius both proclaimed themselves king, followed by Ptolemy, Seleucus, Lysimachus, and eventually Cassander.
  - Struggle over Macedon (298–285 BCE), after the death of king Cassander of Macedon
  - Struggle of Lysimachus and Seleucus (285–281 BCE), after jointly defeating Demetrius and his son Antigonus Gonatas
- Bosporan Civil War (c. 310–309 BCE), after the death of archon Paerisades I of the Bosporan Kingdom
- Pergamene–Bosporan war (c. 47–45 BCE), after the death of king Pharnaces II of Pontus and the Bosporus, between Pharnaces' daughter Dynamis (and her husband Asander) and Pharnaces' brother Mithridates of Pergamon (supported by the Roman Republic)
- Pontic–Bosporan war (c. 17–16 BCE), after the death of king Asander of the Bosporus, between usurper Scribonius (who married queen Dynamis) and the Roman client king Polemon I of Pontus (supported by general Agrippa of the Roman Empire)
- Roman–Bosporan War (c. 45–49 CE), after the deposition of king Mithridates of the Bosporan Kingdom by Roman emperor Claudius and the enthronement of Mithridates' brother Cotys I; Mithridates soon challenged his deposition and fruitlessly warred against Cotys and the Roman Empire
- Boudica's Revolt (60 or 61), after the death of king Prasutagus of the Iceni tribe. The Romans failed to respect Prasutagus's will that emperor Claudius and his daughters would share his inheritance; instead, Roman soldiers occupied and pillaged the Iceni territory and raped Prasutagus's daughters, causing his widow queen Boudica to rise in rebellion.
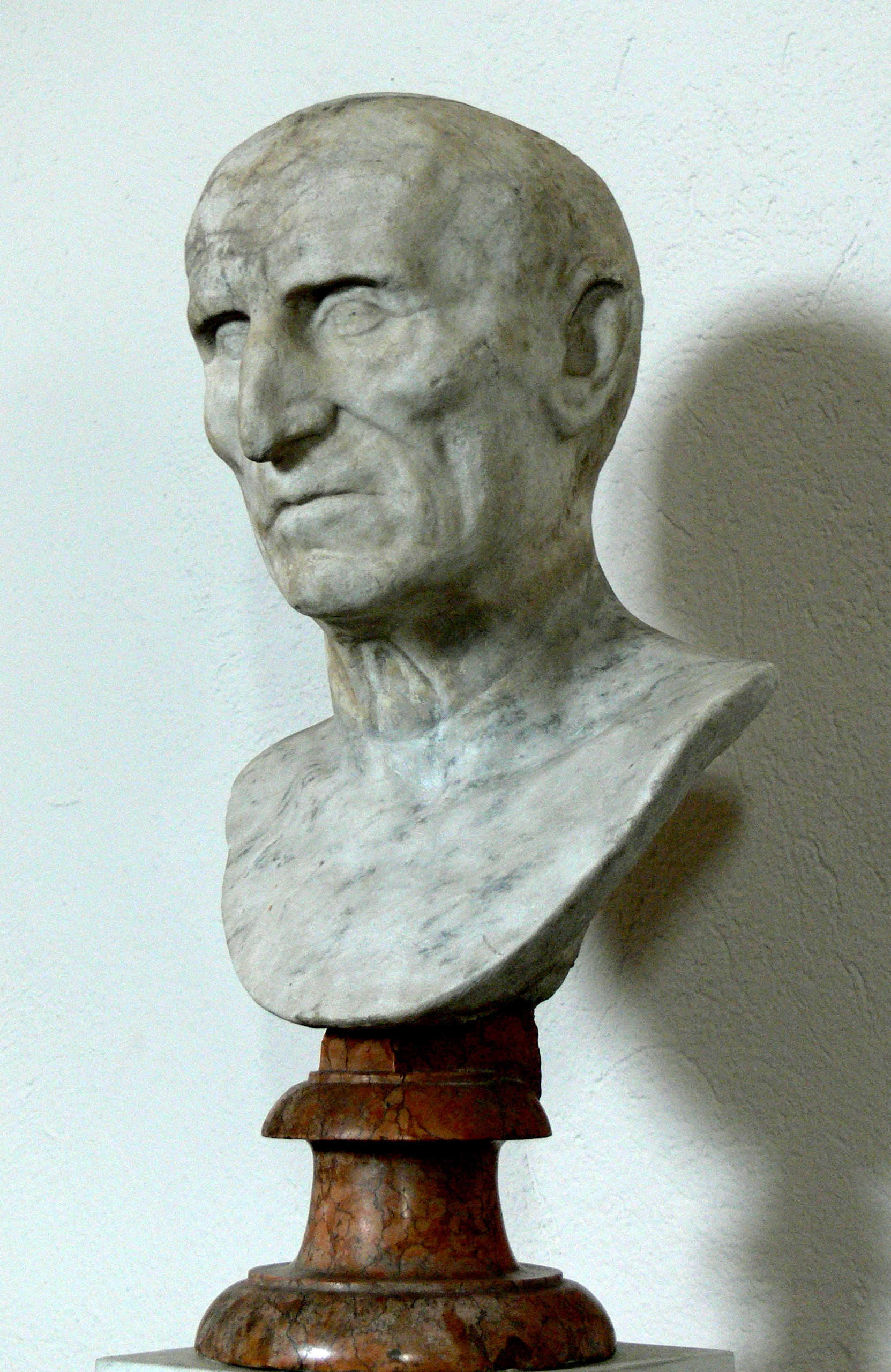
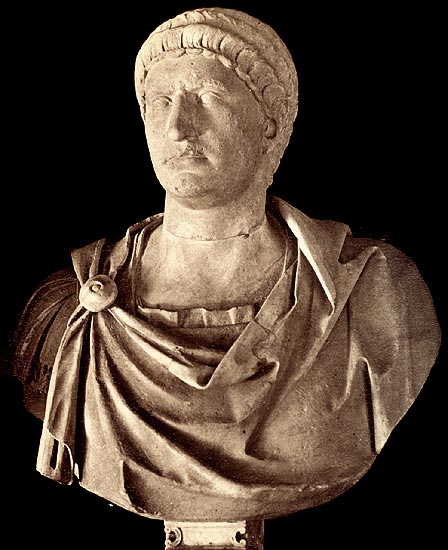
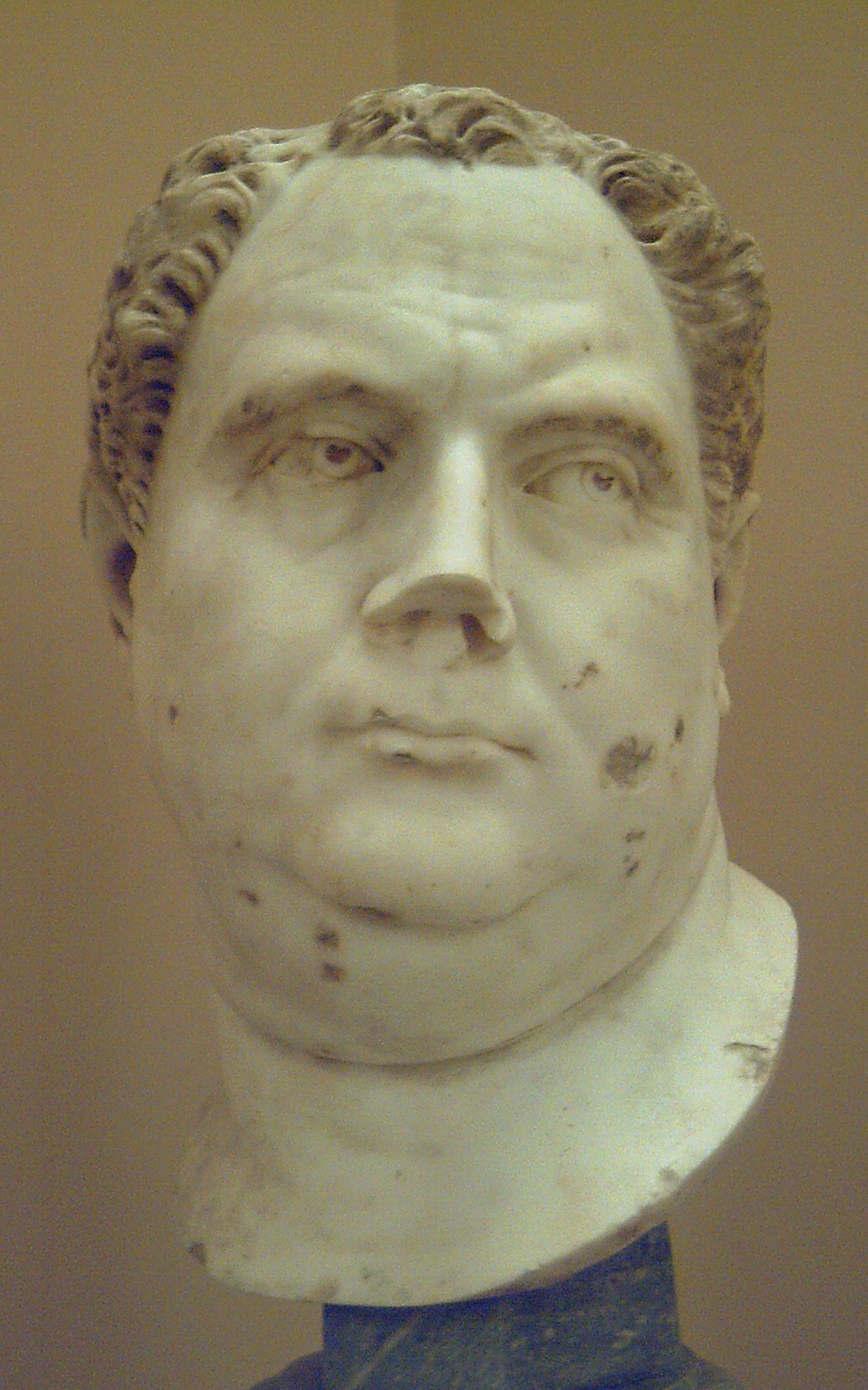
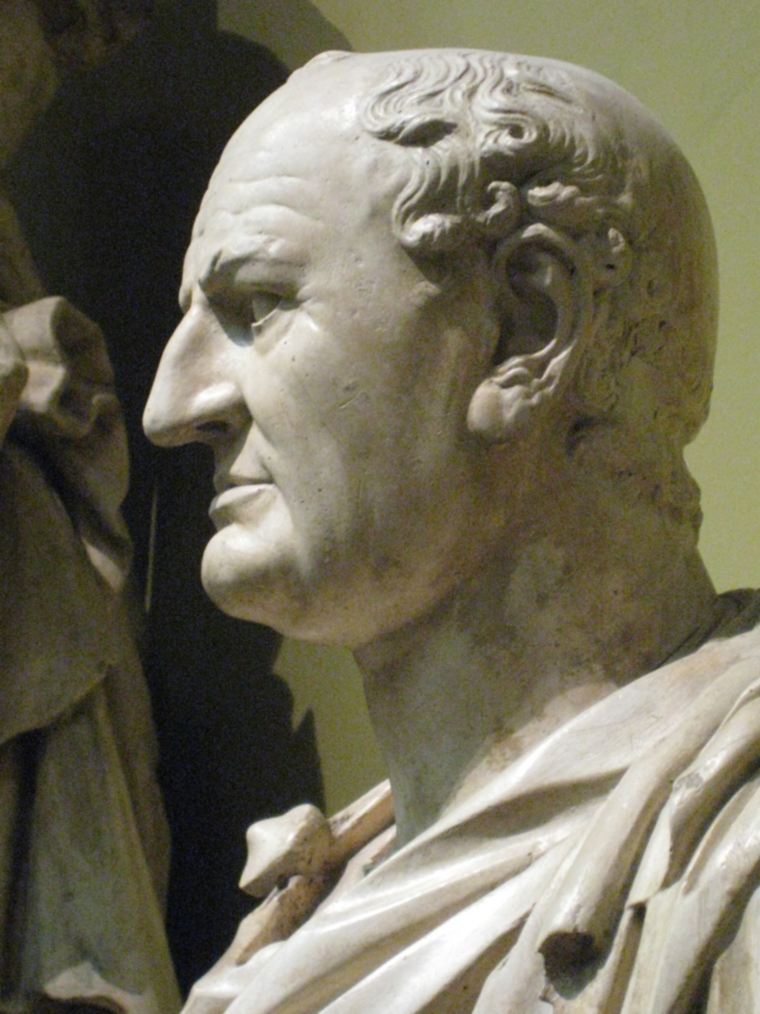
  Year of the Four Emperors: a war of succession between Galba, Otho, Vitellius and Vespasian
- Year of the Four Emperors (68–69), a rebellion in the Roman Empire that became a war of succession after the suicide of emperor Nero
- Year of the Five Emperors (193), the beginning of a war of succession that lasted until 197, after the assassination of the Roman emperor Commodus
- Crisis of the Third Century (235–284), especially the Year of the Six Emperors (238), a series of wars between barracks emperors after the assassination of Severus Alexander
- Civil wars of the Tetrarchy (306–324), after the death of Augustus (senior Roman emperor) Constantius I Chlorus
- War of Magnentius (350–353), after the assassination of Roman co-emperor Constans I
- War between Western Roman emperor Eugenius and Eastern Roman emperor Theodosius I (392–394), after the death of emperor Valentinian II, resulting in the Battle of the Frigidus
- War of the Hunnic succession (453–454), after the death of Attila, ruler of the Huns

== Medieval Europe ==
=== 6th–8th century ===
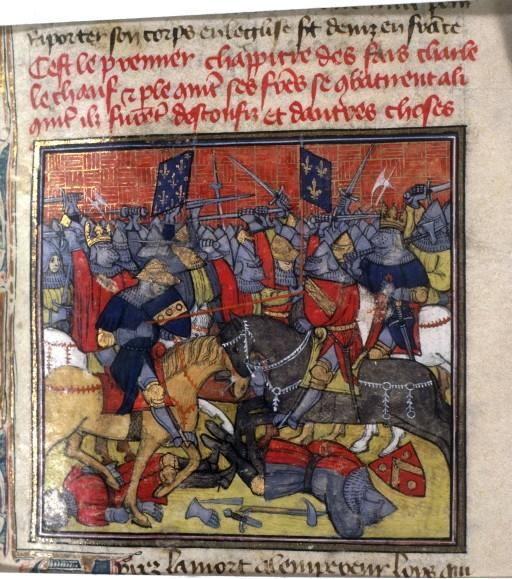
Fontenoy confirmed the partition of Francia between emperor Louis the Pious's three sons.

- Fredegund–Brunhilda wars or Merovingian throne struggle (568–613), after the assassination of queen Galswintha of Neustria (sister of Brunhilda of Austrasia, both daughters of Visigothic king Athanagild) by her husband king Chilperic I of Neustria and his mistress Fredegund, who then married. Brunhilda then persuaded her husband, king Sigebert I of Austrasia, to wage war on Fredegund and Chilperic to avenge her sister and restore the Visigothic royal family's position of power over Neustria. Fredegund had Sigebert (575) and her own husband Chilperic (584) assassinated, ruling as her son Chlothar II's regent and warring against Austrasia until her death in 597. Chlothar II continued this war until he captured and executed Brunhilda (613), briefly reuniting the Frankish Empire.
- Byzantine–Sasanian War of 602–628, Khosrow II invaded the Byzantine Empire under the pretext of installing a pseudo-Theodosius to the throne following the murder of emperor Maurice
- Lombard war of succession (661–662), after the death of king Aripert I of the Kingdom of the Lombards
- Lombard war of succession (668–669), after the death of king Perctarit of the Kingdom of the Lombards
- Neustrian war of succession (673), after the death of king Chlothar III of Neustria. Mayor Ebroin enthroned puppet-king Theuderic III, but Neustrian aristocrats revolted and offered the crowns of Neustria and Burgundy to king Childeric II of Austrasia, who emerged victorious and briefly reunited the Frankish Empire.
- Frankish war of succession (675–679), after the assassination of the Frankish king Childeric II and queen Bilichild (675); mayor Ebroin once again enthroned puppet-king Theuderic III, and emerged victorious in the Battle of Lucofao.
- Twenty Years' Anarchy (695–717), after the deposition of emperor Justinian II of the Byzantine Empire
- Lombard war of succession (700–712), after the death of king Cunipert of the Kingdom of the Lombards
- Frankish Civil War (715–718) (nl), after the death of mayor of the palace Pepin of Herstal
- Siege of Laon (741), after the death of mayor of the palace Charles Martel
- Lombard war of succession (756–757), after the death of king Aistulf of the Kingdom of the Lombards

=== 9th century ===
- Danish war of succession (812–814), after the death of king Hemming of Denmark
- (uncertain) Gwynedd war of succession (c. 816–825) between the two brothers Hywel ap Rhodri Molwynog and Cynan Dindaethwy ap Rhodri
- Carolingian wars of succession (830–842), a series of armed conflicts in the late Frankish Carolingian Empire about the (future) succession of emperor Louis the Pious
- War of the Northumbrian succession (865–867), between king Osberht and king Ælla of Northumbria; their infighting was interrupted when the Great Heathen Army invaded, against which they vainly joined forces
- Carolingian war of succession (c. 887–890), after the deposition (November 887) and death (January 888) of emperor Charles the Fat. Contenders included Arnulf of Carinthia (who had deposed Charles, and became king of East Francia), Odo of France (crowned king of (West) Francia in February 888), Berengar I of Italy (possibly began reigning as king of Italy in December 887), Guy III of Spoleto (crowned king of Italy in 889), Louis the Blind (king of Provence since January 887), Rudolph I of Burgundy (elected king, ruled Upper Burgundy, fought with Arnulf over Lotharingia), and Ranulf II of Aquitaine (declared himself king and ruled in Aquitaine until 889/890).
- Serbian war of succession (892–897), after the death of prince Mutimir of Serbia
- Svatopluk II rebellion (895–899?), after the death of duke Svatopluk I of Great Moravia
- Æthelwold's Revolt (899–902), after the death of king Alfred the Great of Wessex

=== 10th century ===
- War of the Leonese succession (951–956), after the death of king Ramiro II of León
- (historicity contested) Olga's Revenge on the Drevlians (945–947), after the Kievan Rus' Drevlian vassals assassinated Igor of Kiev. Initially, the Drevlian prince Mal offered to marry Igor's widow Olga of Kiev and thus succeed him, but Olga appointed herself as regent over her young son Svyatoslav, made war on the Drevlians and destroyed their realm. The historicity of the events as described in the main document on the conflict, the Primary Chronicle, is contested, and the war is described as 'legendary' with a mix of fact and fiction.
- Gwynedd war of succession (950), after the death of king Hywel Dda of Gwynedd and Deheubarth
- Feud of the Sviatoslavichi or Kievan Rus' Dynastic War (c. 972–980), after the death of king Sviatoslav I of Kiev
- War of the Hamaland succession (c. 973 – c. 996), after the death of count Wichman II of Hamaland, between sisters Adela of Hamaland and Liutgard of Elten (supported by Balderic, Count of Upladium)
- War of the Leonese succession (982–984), continuation of the last Leonese war of succession
- Stephen–Koppány war, also known as 'Koppány's rebellion' or contemporaneously 'the war between the Germans and the Hungarians' (997–998), after the death Géza, Grand Prince of the Hungarians. Stephen (pagan birth name: Vajk) was Géza's oldest son and claimed the throne by primogeniture; his army was described as 'the Germans'. Koppány was the brother of Géza's widow Sarolt and claimed the throne by agnatic seniority; his army was described as 'the Hungarians'. Later Christian sources emphasise Stephen's Christianity as an argument for his legitimacy, claim that Koppány was a pagan and that agnatic seniority was a 'pagan' custom as opposed to the 'Christian' custom of primogeniture, and that therefore Koppány 'rebelled' against the legitimate Christian king Stephen, but the reliability and impartiality of these sources is disputed.

=== 11th century ===
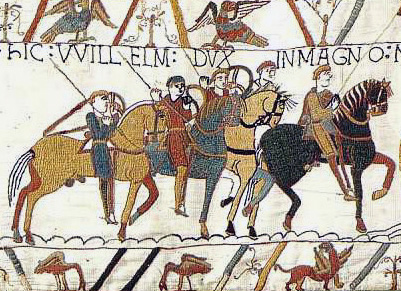
In 1066, William of Normandy managed to enforce his claim to the English throne.

- Bohemian war of succession (999–1012), after the death of duke Boleslaus II "the Pious" of Bohemia between his three sons Boleslaus III, Jaromír, and Oldřich.
  - German–Polish War (1003–1018), erupted due to clashing interventions of Polish duke Bolesław I the Brave and German king (from 1014 emperor) Henry II in the Bohemian war of succession.
- German war of succession (January–October 1002), after the death of Otto III, Holy Roman Emperor. See also 1002 German royal election.
- War of the Burgundian Succession (1002–1016), after the death of duke Henry I the Great of Burgundy
- Fitna of al-Andalus (1009–1031), after the deposition of caliph Hisham II of Córdoba
- Lower Lorrainian war of succession (1012–1018), after the death of Otto, Duke of Lower Lorraine
- Kievan succession crisis of 1015–1019, after the death of prince Volodimer I Sviatoslavich "the Great" of Kievan Rus'
  - Bolesław I's intervention in the Kievan succession crisis (1018), duke Bolesław I the Brave of Poland supported Sviatopolk's claim against Yaroslav
- Cnut's conquest of England (1014–1016), after the death of Sweyn Forkbeard, King of the English
- Norwegian War of Succession (1025/26–1035), after the departure of king Cnut the Great of Denmark to England. It started with the Battle of Helgeå; it only became a war of succession when king Olaf II of Norway was deposed in 1028 and killed in the Battle of Stiklestad in 1030.
- Norman war of succession (1026), after the death of duke Richard II of Normandy between his sons Richard III and Robert I
- War of the Burgundian Succession (1032–1037), after the death Rudolph III of Burgundy.
- Norman war of succession (1035–1047), after the death of duke Robert I of Normandy. The Battle of Val-ès-Dunes is generally regarded as having secured the reign of William of Normandy (Note: Initially, William of Normandy was called William "the Bastard" by his opponents because he was an illegitimate son (bastard) of Robert I, and therefore some Norman noblemen rejected him as successor. Later, he became known as William "the Conqueror" when he also managed to enforce his claim to the English throne with the 1066 Norman invasion of England. William's reign in Normandy itself was not unopposed until 1060, despite being largely secured since 1047.)
- Kalbid war of succession (1044–1061), after the deposition of the Kalbid emir Hasan as-Samsam of Sicily. The Emirate of Sicily fragmented into several warring factions with three main emirates based in Trapani (western Sicily), Enna (central Sicily) and Syracuse (eastern Sicily). After conquering western Sicily in 1053, emir Ibn al-Thumna of Syracuse struggled to defeat his brother-in-law Ibn Hawwas, the emir of Enna in central Sicily; in 1061, he therefore hired Norman mercenaries from the Hauteville family to assist him. This began the Norman conquest of Sicily (1061–1091); Ibn al-Thumna was soon set aside and assassinated in 1062, although his followers largely continued supporting the Norman invasion.
- Revolt of Michael V (1041–1042), after the death of emperor Michael IV the Paphlagonian of the Byzantine Empire
- Peter–Aba war (1041–1044), after the deposition of king Peter the Venetian of Hungary, and the royal election of Samuel Aba to replace him. Peter fled to Austria and rallied support from Adalbert, Margrave of Austria and Henry III, Holy Roman Emperor to retake his throne. Decided at the Battle of Ménfő.
- Danish war of succession (1042–1043), after the death of king Harthacnut (Canute III) of Denmark
- Norman conquest of Maine (1062–1063), after the death of count Herbert II of Maine
- War of the Three Sanchos (1065–1067), after the death of the Jiménez king Ferdinand I "the Great" of León (and Castile)
- Harald Hardrada's invasion of England involving the Battle of Fulford and the Battle of Stamford Bridge (1066), after the death of king Edward the Confessor of England
- Norman invasion of England (1066–1075), after the death of king Edward the Confessor of England
- (historicity contested) Eric and Eric (c. 1066–1067): according to Adam of Bremen, they were two claimants who fought each other after the death of king Stenkil of Sweden. Modern historians doubt whether the two Erics even existed.
- Jiménez fraternal war (1067–1072), after the death of the Jiménez queen Sancha of León, wife of the late Ferdinand I "the Great" of León (and Castile)
- War of the Carcassonne succession (1067–1082), after the death of viscount Roger III of Carcassonne
- War of the Flemish succession (1070–1071), after the death of count Baldwin VI of Flanders
- Byzantine war of succession (1071–1072), after Byzantine emperor Romanos IV Diogenes was defeated in the Battle of Manzikert (26 August 1071) and deposed when John Doukas enthroned Michael VII Doukas in Constantinople (24 October 1071). The war consisted of the Battle of Dokeia and the Sieges of Tyropoion and Adana, all of which Romanos lost. Simultaneously, the Uprising of Georgi Voyteh (1072) took place in Bulgaria, which was also crushed by Michael VII.
- Apulian-Calabrian war of succession (1085–1089), after the death of the Hauteville duke Robert Guiscard of Apulia and Calabria between his sons Bohemond I of Antioch and Roger Borsa
- Rebellion of 1088, after the death of William the Conqueror of Normandy and England
- War of the Croatian Succession (1091–1105), after the death of king Stephen II of Croatia. Decided at the Battle of Gvozd Mountain (1097).
- Chernihiv war of succession (1093–1097), after the death of Vsevolod I Yaroslavich, grand prince of Kievan Rus' and prince of Chernihiv and Pereyaslavl
- Internecine war of Rus' 1097–1100, after the blinding and imprisonment of prince Vasylko Rostyslavych of Terebovlia
- Este war of succession (1097), after the death of Albert Azzo II, Margrave of Milan, founder of the House of Este. The oldest son by his second wife Garsende, Fulco I, Margrave of Milan, won the war and continued the House of Este in Italy. His son by his first wife Kunigunde of Altdorf, Welf I, Duke of Bavaria, became the founder of the House of Welf.

=== 12th century ===
- Duklja succession crisis (1101–1103), after the death of king Constantine Bodin of Duklja
- Anglo-Norman war of succession (1101–1106), after the death of king William II of England
- Salian war of succession (1125–1135), after the death of Henry V, Holy Roman Emperor, the last monarch of the Salian dynasty
- War of the Flemish succession (1127–1128), after the assassination of count Charles I "the Good" of Flanders, between Thierry of Alsace, William Clito and Baldwin IV of Hainaut
- Apulian war of succession (1127–1130), after the death of the Hauteville duke William II of Apulia and Calabria between his first cousin once removed Roger II of Sicily on the one hand, and his second cousin once removed Robert II of Capua and Ranulf II of Alife (Roger II's brother-in-law) on the other. (Note: Roger II of Sicily was the son of Roger "Bosso" I of Sicily, William II of Apulia was the grandson of Robert Guiscard, and Robert II of Capua was the great-grandson of Fressenda and Robert I of Capua; thus, all three descended from three different children of Tancred of Hauteville.)
- Civil war era in Norway or Norwegian Civil War(s) (1130–1240), after the death of king Sigurd the Crusader of Norway
- Calw war of succession (1131–1151), after the death of count Godfrey of Calw. Emperor Frederick Barbarossa would decide the conflict in favour of Uta of Schauenburg in 1151.
- 1132–1134 Pereyaslavl succession crisis: after the death of grand prince Mstislav I of Kiev, Yaropolk II of Kiev succeeded him unopposed, but made a widely disputed appointment for the Principality of Pereyaslavl, whose holder was heir presumptive of Kiev
- The Anarchy (1135–1154), after the death of king Henry I of England (his only son William having predeceased him in the White Ship disaster), between his daughter Empress Matilda and nephew Stephen of Blois. The peace stipulated that the crown would remain with Stephen, but subsequently pass to Matilda's son, Henry II.
- German war of succession (1138–1139), after the 1137 death of Lothair III, Holy Roman Emperor and the 1138 Imperial election, between Conrad III of Germany and Henry X, Duke of Bavaria
- 1139–1142 Kievan succession crisis, after the death of grand prince Yaropolk II of Kiev
- Baussenque Wars (1144–1162), after the death of count Berenguer Ramon I of Provence
- 1146–1159 Kievan succession crisis (or Internecine war of Rus' 1146–1154), after the death of grand prince Vsevolod II of Kiev
- Danish Civil War (1146–1157), after the abdication of king Eric III of Denmark
- Castilian war of succession (from 1158), after the death of king Sancho III of Castile over the regency of his son, infant king Alfonso VIII of Castile, between the houses of Lara and Castro. King Sancho VI of Navarre took the opportunity to rescind his vassalage to Castile, and invaded to take several territories until a truce in 1167. When Alfonso VIII came of age in 1170, he renewed hostilities to retake the Castilian lands lost during his infancy.
- Serbian war of succession (c. 1166–1168), after the brothers Tihomir of Serbia and Stefan Nemanja failed to properly share the inheritance of their father Zavida

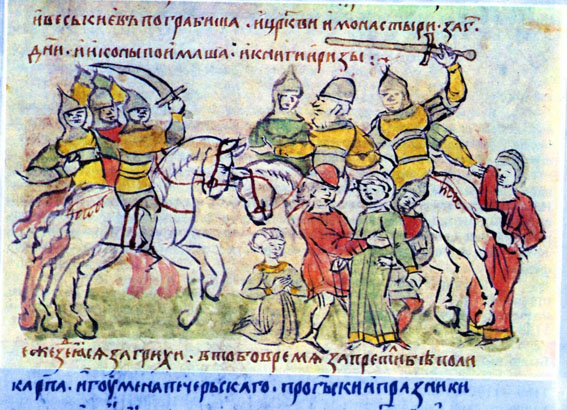
The Sack of Kiev (1169) was part of the 1167–1169 Kievan succession crisis between rival princely clans

- 1167–1169 Kievan succession crisis, after the death of grand prince Rostislav I of Kiev
- Gwynedd war of succession (1170–1174), after the death of Owain Gwynedd, king of Gwynedd, prince of the Welsh. Dafydd ab Owain Gwynedd emerged victorious.
- Kievan war of succession (1171–1173), after the death of grand prince Gleb of Kiev
- 1174–1177 Suzdalian war of succession, after the murder of prince Andrey Bogolyubsky of Vladimir-Suzdal
- War of the Namurois–Luxemburgish succession (1186 – 1263 or 1265), after the decades-long childless count Henry the Blind of Namur and Luxemburg, having designated Baldwin V of Hainaut his heir in 1165, after all fathered Ermesinde in 1186 and tried to change his succession in her favour. Although the struggle over Luxemburg was resolved in 1199 in favour of Ermesinde, she and Baldwin and their successors would continue to fight over Namur until it was sold to Guy of Dampierre in 1263 or 1265.
- Sicilian war of succession (1189–1194), after the death of king William II of Sicily
- Internecine war of Rus' 1195–1196, after the death of grand prince Svyatoslav III Vsevolodovych of Kievan Rus'
- Brothers' Quarrel (Hungary) (1197–1203), after the death of king Béla III of Hungary and Croatia

=== 13th century ===
- German throne dispute (1198–1215), after the death of Henry VI, Holy Roman Emperor. Although mostly a political conflict between the House of Hohenstaufen and House of Welf, the Battle of Bouvines (1214) meant the de facto defeat of pretender-king Otto IV of Welf, deposed in 1215 in favour of anti-king Frederick II of Hohenstaufen.
- Angevin war of succession (1199–1204), after the death of Richard the Lionheart of England, Normandy, Aquitaine, Anjou, Brittany, Maine and Touraine, collectively known as the Angevin Empire
  - The French invasion of Normandy (1202–1204) was the last part of the Angevin war of succession
- Deheubarth war of succession (1197–1201), after the death of prince Rhys ap Gruffydd of Deheubarth and Wales. Maelgwn ap Rhys emerged victorious.
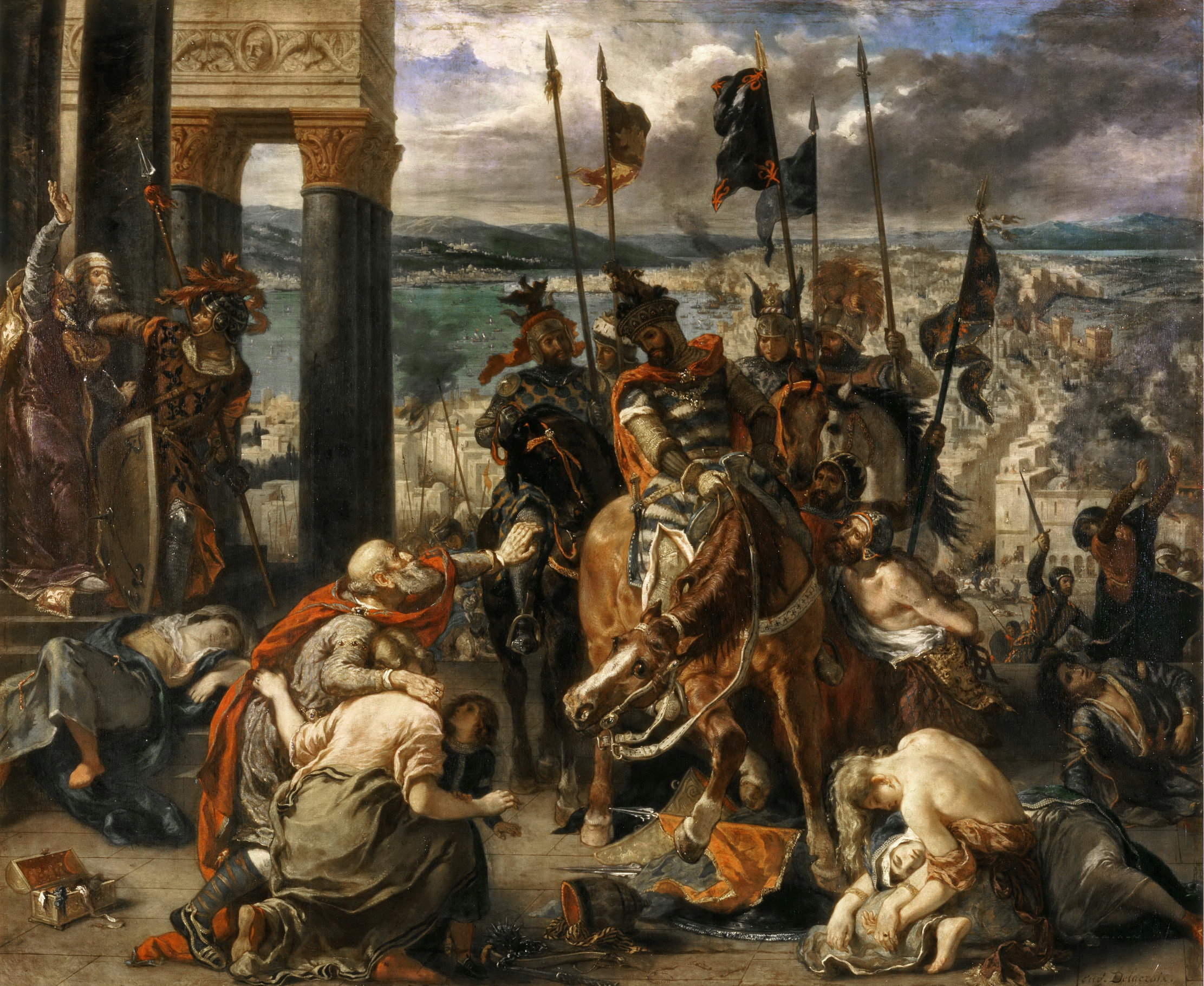
  Entry of the Crusaders in Constantinople, Eugène Delacroix (1840). The 1204 Sack of Constantinople caused a complex series of related wars of succession in Southeastern Europe and Asia Minor, as many pretenders laid claim to the Eastern Roman (Byzantine) Empire's legacy.
- Fourth Crusade (1202–1204), was redirected to Constantinople to intervene in a Byzantine succession dispute after the deposition of emperor Isaac II Angelos and ended with the Frankokratia.
  - The Struggle for Constantinople (1204–1261): Complex series of wars of succession between the Sack of Constantinople, the deaths of emperors Isaac II Angelos, Alexios IV Angelos and Alexios V Doukas of the Byzantine Empire in 1204, and the Reconquest of Constantinople in 1261. The de facto succession came in the hands of the Latin Empire, but was challenged by Nicaea, Trebizond, Thessalonica, and Bulgaria, amongst others. Sporadic attempts to restore the Latin Empire and clashes with the Frankish and Angevin rulers continued to the death of the last pretender James of Baux in 1383.
    - Nicaean–Latin wars (1204–1261). Constantine Laskaris and Theodore I Laskaris were early candidates for the Byzantine emperorship, and would found the Empire of Nicaea in order to restore it.
      - Nicaean war of succession (1221–1223/24), after the death of emperor Theodore I Laskaris of Nicaea
    - Bulgarian–Latin wars (1204 or 1230 – 1261). Although war between them broke out almost immediately after the Latin Empire was founded, the Bulgarian monarch would not claim the Byzantine emperorship until defeating pretender Theodore Komnenos Doukas of the Empire of Thessalonica in 1230.
    - Trapezuntine wars against the Latin Empire and Nicaea (from 1204). Alexios I of Trebizond proclaimed himself Byzantine emperor in April 1204 (around the Sack of Constantinople) as the legitimate heir of Andronikos I Komnenos. Relations were normalized with the Byzantine–Trapezuntine treaty of 1282.
    - Battle of Antioch on the Meander (1211). A Seljuk attempt to install former Byzantine emperor Alexios III Angelos to the throne of Nicea.
    - Thessalonian wars against the Latin Empire, Bulgaria and Nicaea (1224–1242). Theodore Komnenos Doukas proclaimed himself the Byzantine emperor upon conquering Thessalonica in 1224, a direct challenge to the Latin and Nicaean pretenders.
- Serbian war of succession (1202–1205), after the death of grand prince Stefan Nemanja of Serbia
- Loon War (1203–1206), after the death of Dirk VII, Count of Holland
- War of the Galician Succession (1205–1245), after the death of Roman Mstyslavych "the Great", grand prince of Kiev, prince of Galicia and Volynia
  - Internecine war in Rus' (1206—1210) after the death of Roman the Great of Halych and Volynia
- Lombard Rebellion (1207–1209), after the death of king Boniface of Thessalonica
- Bulgarian war of succession (1207–1218), after the death of tsar Kaloyan of Bulgaria. Boril, Ivan Asen II, Strez, and Alexius Slav were amongst the pretenders.
- Portuguese inheritance conflict (1211–1216), after the death of king Sancho I of Portugal. Afonso II of Portugal denied his sisters Theresa of Portugal, Queen of León (supported by her ex-husband Alfonso IX of León) Sancha, Lady of Alenquer and Mafalda of Portugal a share in the inheritance, in violation of Sancho I's will, leading to war. The Leonese army of Alfonso IX supporting the three sisters and their Portuguese allies defeated the army of Afonso II and his Portuguese supporters at the Battle of Valdevez in early 1212, but then Alfonso VIII of Castile intervened in behalf of Afonso II and forced the Leonese to withdraw. Although Pope Innocent III declared peace among Christian realms and to join forces against the Muslims ahead of the Battle of Las Navas de Tolosa (16 July 1212), the three sisters managed to get the Pope to place Portugal under an interdict for 1 1/2 years in August 1212. Shortly after, Alfonso of Leon, Alfonso of Castile and Afonso of Portugal signed a truce at Coimbra and pledged mutual aid against the Muslims. Afonso's dispute with his sisters was finally settled in 1216.
- War of the Moha succession (1212–1213), over the County of Moha after the death of count Albert II of Dagsburg
- Vladimir-Suzdal war of succession (1212–1216) decided at the Battle of Lipitsa, after the death of grand prince Vsevolod the Big Nest of Vladimir-Suzdal
- Castilian war of succession (1214 or 1217 – 1218), after the death of king Alfonso VIII of Castile and especially king Henry I of Castile, prompting a war over the regency and a Leonese invasion
- First Barons' War (1215–1217). The war began as a Barons' revolt over king John Lackland's violation of Magna Carta, but quickly turned into a dynastic war for the throne of England when French crown prince Louis became their champion, and John Lackland unexpectedly died.
- War of the Urgell succession (c. 1220–1228), after the death of count Ermengol VIII of Urgell between Aurembiaix and Guerau IV de Cabrera
- War of the Succession of Champagne (1216–1222), indirectly after the death of count Theobald III of Champagne
- War of the Schlawe and Stolp succession (1223–1236), after the death of Ratibor II, Duke of Pomerania, over the Lands of Schlawe and Stolp
- War of the Succession of Breda (1226 or 1228 – 1231/32), after the death of lord Henry III of Schoten of Breda
- Internecine war in Rus' 1228–1240, after the death of prince Mstyslav Mstyslavych Udatnyi of Tmutorokan and Chernihiv
- Isenberg Confusions (1232–1243), traces back to the 1226 execution of count Frederick of Isenberg for the 1225 killing of archbishop Engelbert II of Cologne
- Danish war of succession (1241–1244), after the death of king Valdemar II of Denmark
- War of the Flemish Succession (1244–1254), after the death of countess Joan of Constantinople of Flanders and Hainaut
- Austrian Interregnum or War of the Babenberg Succession (1246 – 1256 or 1278 or 1282), after the death of Frederick II, Duke of Austria. An important event was the Battle of Kressenbrunn (1260).
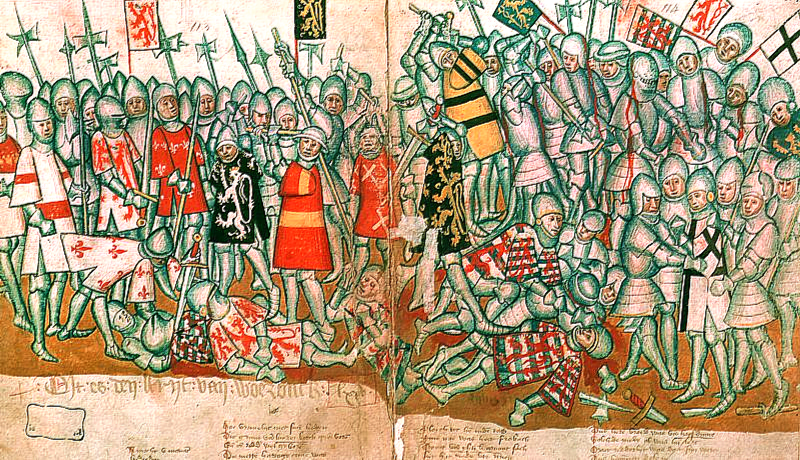
  The Battle of Worringen, the decisive confrontation of the War of the Limburg Succession, as shown in a 15th-century Brabantsche Yeesten manuscript
- War of the Thuringian Succession (1247–1264), after the death of landgrave Henry Raspe IV of Thuringia
- Great Interregnum (1245 or 1250 – 1273), after the deposition and death of emperor Frederick II of the Holy Roman Empire
- Bigorre succession crisis (1255–1302), after the death of countess Alice of Bigorre
- War of the Euboeote Succession (1256–1258), after the death of triarch Carintana dalle Carceri of Negroponte
- Bulgarian war of succession (1256–1261), after the assassination of tsar Ivan Asen II of Bulgaria
- Bremen Diocesan Feud (1258–1259), after the death of prince-bishop Gerhard II.
- Conradin's invasion of Sicily (1268), following his deposition and the Angevin conquest of Sicily. Decided in the Battle of Tagliacozzo.
- Civil war in Pomerelia (1269–1272), after the death of Świętopełk II, Duke of Pomerania
- Castilian war of succession (1282–1304): after the death of crown prince Ferdinand de la Cerda (1275) and in anticipation of the death of king Alfonso X of Castile (1284), Ferdinand's brother Sancho proclaimed himself king in 1282, while Ferdinand's sons Alfonso de la Cerda and Ferdinand de la Cerda, Lord of Lara claimed to be the rightful heirs until they rescinded their claims in 1304
- Nevskian war of succession or Vladimir-Suzdal war of succession (1281—1293), after the death of grand prince Alexander Nevsky of Vladimir-Suzdal (1263). Some skirmishes already happened in 1263 and 1276.
- War of the Sicilian Vespers (1282–1302), triggered by a rebellion against Charles I of Anjou. The rebels invited Peter III of Aragon as the jure uxoris heir of the Hohenstaufen.
  - Sporadic warfare reflamed in 1312, when Frederick III crowned his son Peter king and was only ended in 1372.
- War of the Limburg Succession (1283–1288), after the death of duke Waleran IV and his daughter and heiress Irmgard of Limburg
- Croato–Hungarian war of succession (1290–1301), after the death of king Ladislaus IV of Hungary and Croatia
- (uncertain) Greater Poland war of succession (1296), after the assassination of Przemysł II, king of Poland and duke of Greater Poland, on 8 February 1296. The war, if it really took place, did not last long, because on 10 March 1296 in Krzywiń an armistice was signed.

=== 14th century ===
- Feud between Armagnac and Foix-Béarn (1290–1377), after the death of Gaston VII, Viscount of Béarn, causing a long, intermittent feud between the House of Armagnac and the House of Foix-Béarn. The conflict became entangled with the Hundred Years' War (1337–1453), and resulted in the Battle of Launac (1362).
- Imeretian war of succession (1293–1327), after the death of David VI
- Scottish Wars of Independence (1296–1357), after the Scottish nobility requested king Edward I of England to mediate in the 1286–1292 Scottish succession crisis, known as the "Great Cause". Edward would claim that his role in appointing the new king of Scots, John Balliol, meant that he was now Scotland's overlord, and started to interfere in Scottish domestic affairs, causing dissent.
  - First War of Scottish Independence (1296–1328), after Scottish opposition to Edward's interference reached the point of rebellion, Edward marched against Scotland, defeating and imprisoning John Balliol, stripping him off the kingship, and effectively annexing Scotland. However, William Wallace and Andrew Moray rose up against Edward and assumed the title of "guardians of Scotland" on behalf of John Balliol, passing this title on to Robert the Bruce (one of the claimants during the Great Cause) and John Comyn in 1298. The former killed the latter in 1306, and was crowned king of Scots shortly after, in opposition to both Edward and the still imprisoned John Balliol.
  - Second War of Scottish Independence, or Anglo-Scottish War of Succession (1332–1357), after the death of king of Scots Robert the Bruce
- Árpád war of succession (1301–1308), after the death of king Andrew III of Hungary and the extinction of the Árpád dynasty
- Polish-Bohemian war (1305–1308), after the death of king Wenceslaus II of Bohemia and Poland
- A series of conflicts over the Principality of Achaea (c. 1307 – c. 1396), slowly build up by a series of events like the Treaty of Viterbo, the deaths of William of Villehardouin and Philip of Sicily, and triggered by the eventual deposition of Isabella of Villehardouin. In its final stage, it converged with the Neapolitan conflicts (see below) but the crisis ended when Louis II of Anjou and Ladislaus of Naples sold their rights to the principality.
- German war of succession (1314–1322), after the death of emperor Henry VII and the double elections of Frederick the Fair (on 19 October 1314) and Louis the Bavarian (on the following day). Frederick was captured at the Battle of Mühldorf in 1322 and in 1325 they resolved the conflict with the Treaty of Trausnitz by forming a joint rule.
- Brandenburgish Interregnum (1319/1320–1323), after the death of Waldemar, Margrave of Brandenburg-Stendal. See also False Waldemar.
- Byzantine civil war of 1321–1328, after the deaths of Manuel Palaiologos and his father, co-emperor Michael IX Palaiologos, and the exclusion of Andronikos III Palaiologos from the line of succession
- Bredevoorter Feud (1322–1326), after the death of count Herman II of Lohn
- Wars of the Rügen Succession (1326–1328; 1340–1354), after the death of prince Vitslav III of Rügen
- Wars of the Loon Succession (1336–1366), after the death of count Louis IV of Loon
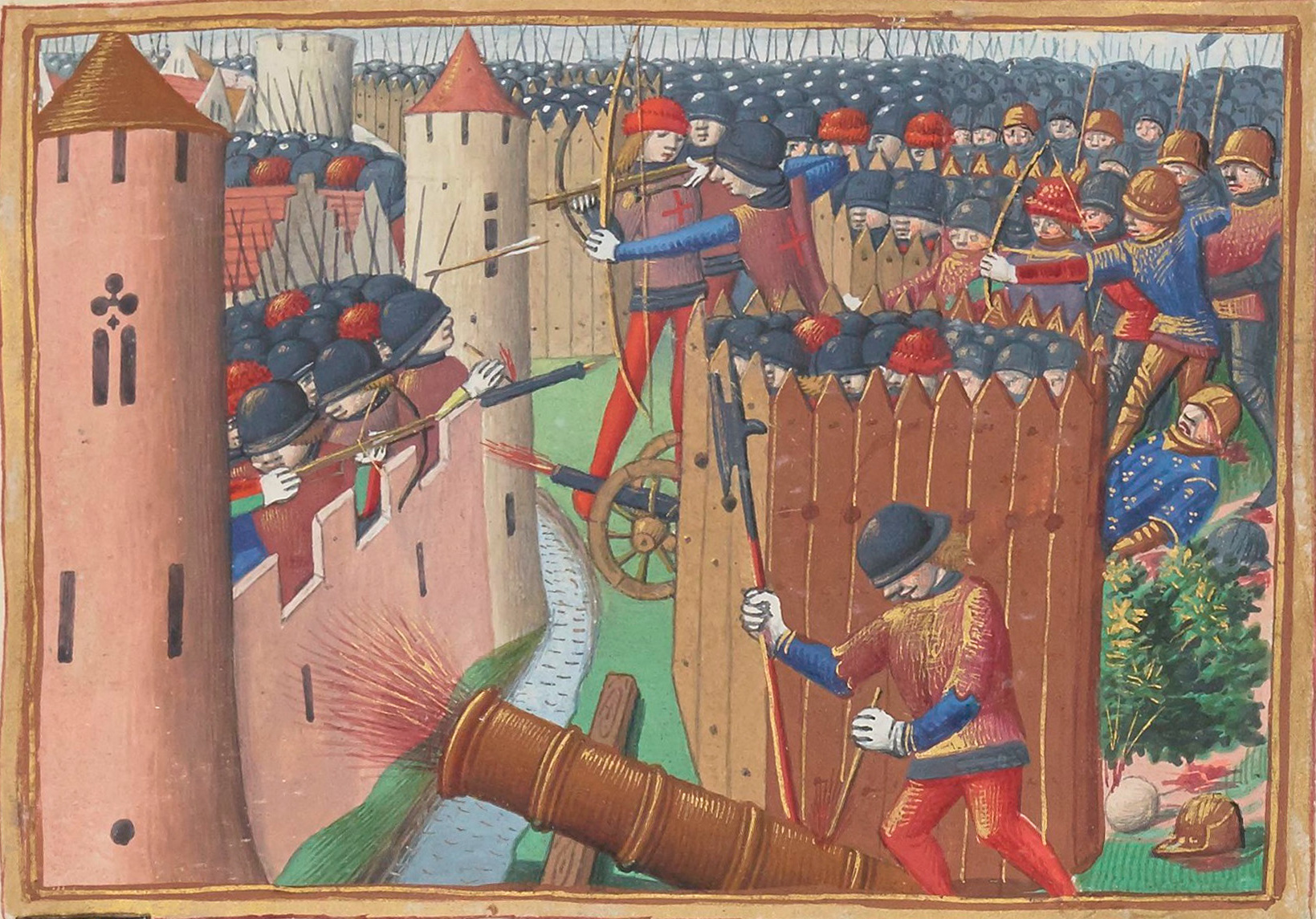
  Siege of Orléans. The Hundred Years' War arose when the English king claimed the French throne.
- Hundred Years' War (1337–1453), which arose after all three of King Philip IV of France's sons died without male issue. This left two male claimants with strong claims to the throne: Edward III of England, who as the son of Philip IV's daughter Isabella of France was his nearest direct male relative, and Philip VI, nephew of Philip IV through the male line and thus the heir under Salic law.
- Galicia–Volhynia Wars (1340–1392), after the death of king Bolesław-Jerzy II of Galicia and Volhynia
- War of the Breton Succession (1341–1365), after the death of duke John III of Brittany. In practice, it became a theatre in the wider Hundred Years' War (1337–1453).
- Byzantine civil war of 1341–1347, after the death of emperor Andronikos III Palaiologos
  - Creation of the Serbian Empire
  - Byzantine civil war of 1352–1357, resumption of the 1341–1347 war after the compromise peace of three emperors ruling simultaneously broke down
- Thuringian Counts' War (1342–1346), continuation of the War of the Thuringian Succession (1247–1264)
- Neapolitan campaigns of Louis the Great (1347–1352), after the assassination of Andrew, Duke of Calabria one day before his coronation as king of Naples
- Hook and Cod wars (1349–1490), after the death of count William IV of Holland
- Guelderian Fraternal Feud (1350–1361), after the death of duke Reginald II of Guelders
- Castilian Civil War (1351–1369), after the death of king Alfonso XI of Castile
  - War of the Two Peters (1356–1375), spillover of the Castilian Civil War and Hundred Years' War
- War of the Valkenburg succession (1352–1365), after the death of lord John of Valkenburg
- War of the Brabantian Succession (1355–1357), after the death of duke John III of Brabant
- Fall of the Serbian Empire (1355–1371), fragmantation of the Serbian Empire after the death of Stefan Dušan:
  - Revolt of Simeon Uroš (1355–1358)
  - Serbian nobility conflict (1369)
- Neuenahr war of succession (1358–1382), after the death of count William III of Neuenahr
- Great Troubles, or Golden Horde Dynastic War (1359–1381), after the assassination of khan Berdi Beg of the Golden Horde
- Fernandine Wars (1369–1382), fought over king Ferdinand I of Portugal's claim to the Castilian succession after the death of king Peter of Castile in 1369
  - First Fernandine War (1369–1370)
  - Second Fernandine War (1372–1373)
  - Third Fernandine War (1381–1382)
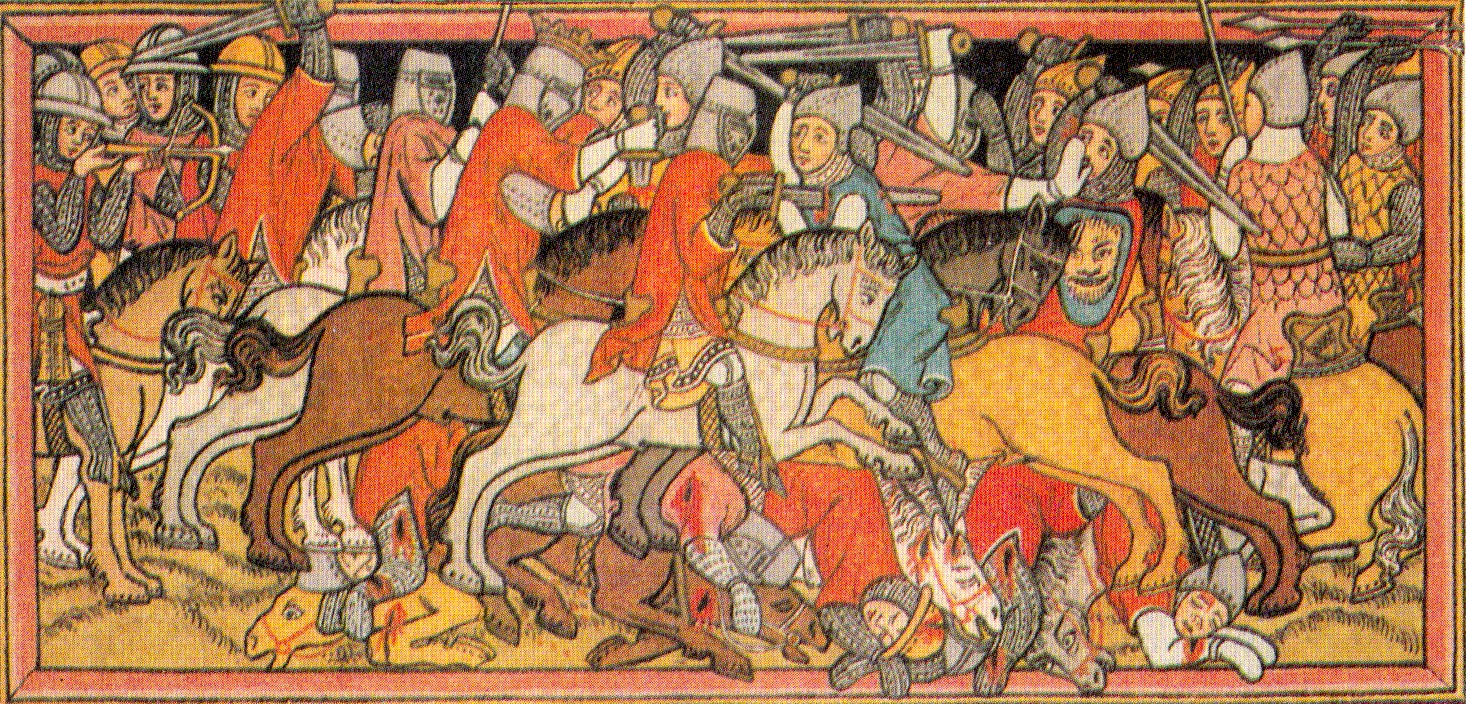
    The 1388 Battle of Strietfield secured Lüneburg for the House of Welf.
- War of the Lüneburg Succession (1370–1389), after the death of duke William II of Brunswick-Lüneburg
- Two Neapolitan wars of succession, after the deposition and assassination of Joanna I of Naples:
  - Louis I's invasion of Naples (1382–1384)
  - War of the Union of Aix (1382–1387), a faction who supported Charles III of Naples against Louis I of Anjou as the Count of Provence
  - Louis II's invasion of Naples (1389–1399), a war between Ladislaus of Naples and Louis II of Anjou
  - Sometimes expended to include later wars like the Aragonese conquest of Naples (1435–1442) or the Italian Wars of 1499–1504.
- The three Guelderian wars of succession:
  - First War of the Guelderian Succession (1371–1379), after the death of duke Reginald III of Guelders
  - Second War of the Guelderian Succession (1423–1448), after the death of duke Reginald IV Guelders and Jülich
  - Third War of the Guelderian Succession (1538–1543), see Guelders Wars (1502–1543)
- Lithuanian war of succession (1377–1387), after the death of grand duke Algirdas of Lithuania, between his son and designated heir Jogaila and his other son Andrei of Polotsk.
  - The Lithuanian Civil War (1381–1384) broke out when Algirdas' brother Kęstutis rebelled against Jogaila and claimed the throne for himself while Jogaila was besieging Andrei at Polotsk.
- War of the Succession of the Patriarchate of Aquileia (1381–1388), after the death of patriarch Marquard of Randeck
- Greater Poland Civil War (1382–1385), after the death of king Louis the Hungarian of Poland
  - Charles III's invasion of Hungary (1385–1386) which was later continued by Ladislaus' invasion (1403)
- 1383–1385 Portuguese interregnum, Portuguese succession crisis and war after the death of king Ferdinand I of Portugal
- Principality of Nizhny Novgorod-Suzdal war of succession (1383–1392), after the death of prince Dmitry Konstantinovich of Suzdal

=== 15th century ===
- Ottoman Interregnum (1401/02–1413), after the imprisonment and death of sultan Bayezid I
- Everstein Feud (1404–1409), after the childless count Herman VII of Everstein signed a treaty of inheritance with Simon III, Lord of Lippe, which was challenged by the Dukes of Brunswick-Lüneburg
- Aragonese Interregnum (1410–1412), after the death of king Martin of Aragon
- (contested) Hussite Wars (1419–1434): some scholars claim that the death of king Wenceslaus IV of Bohemia on 19 August 1419 is the event that sparked the Hussite rebellion against his nominal successor Sigismund (king of Germany, Hungary and Croatia). In 1420, Hussites offered the Bohemian crown to Władysław II Jagiełło instead. Nolan (2006) summarised the Hussites' motives as "doctrinal as well as 'nationalistic' and constitutional", and provided a series of causes: the trial and execution of Jan Hus (1415) "provoked the conflict", the Defenestration of Prague (30 July 1419) "began the conflict", while "fighting began after King Wenceslaus died, shortly after the defenestration" (after 19 August 1419). Nolan described the wars' goals and character as follows: "The main aim of the Hussites was to prevent the hated Sigismund mounting the throne of Bohemia, but fighting between Bohemian Hussites and Catholics spread into Moravia. ... cross-class support gave the Hussite Wars a tripartite and even 'national' character unusual for the age, and a religious and social unity of purpose, faith, and hate". Winkler Prins/Encarta (2002) described the Hussites as a "movement which developed from a religious denomination to a nationalist faction, opposed to German and Papal influence; in the bloody Hussite Wars (1419–1438), they managed to resist." It did not mention the succession of Wenceslaus by Sigismund, but noted elsewhere that it was Sigismund's policy of Catholic Church unity which prompted him to urge Antipope John XXIII to convene the Council of Constance in 1414, which ultimately condemned Jan Hus.
- Neapolitan war of succession (1420–1423), after the Pope Martin V (as the suzerain of Naples) deposed queen Joanna II of Naples on 4 December 1419 on account of her being childless and unmarried (and thus without a male heir), and invested Louis III of Anjou as king of Naples instead.
- The Utrecht wars, related to the Hook and Cod wars.
  - Utrecht Schism (1423–1449), after the death of prince-bishop Frederick of Blankenheim of Utrecht
  - Utrecht war (1456–1458), after the death of prince-bishop Rudolf van Diepholt of Utrecht
  - Utrecht war (1470–1474), aftermath of the 1456–1458 Utrecht war
  - Utrecht war of 1481–1483, spillover of the Hook and Cod wars
- Muscovite War of Succession, or Muscovite Civil War (1425–1453), after the death of grand prince Vasily I of Muscovy
- Lithuanian Civil War (1432–1438), after the death of grand duke Vytautas the Great of Lithuania
- Aragonese conquest of Naples, or 'Aragonese–Neapolitan War' (1435–1442), after the death of queen Joanna II of Naples
- Polish–Bohemian war (from 1437), after the death of king Sigismund of Bohemia. He was supposed to be succeeded by Albert II of Germany, but in 1438, the Czech anti-Habsburg opposition, mainly Hussite factions, offered the Czech crown to Polish king Jagiełło II's younger son Casimir instead. The idea, accepted in Poland over Zbigniew Oleśnicki's objections, resulted in two unsuccessful Polish military expeditions to Bohemia. Included the Battle of Sellnitz.
- Habsburg Dynastic War (1439–1457), after the death of Albert II of Germany
  - Hungarian war of succession (1439–1442), after the death of Albert II of Germany
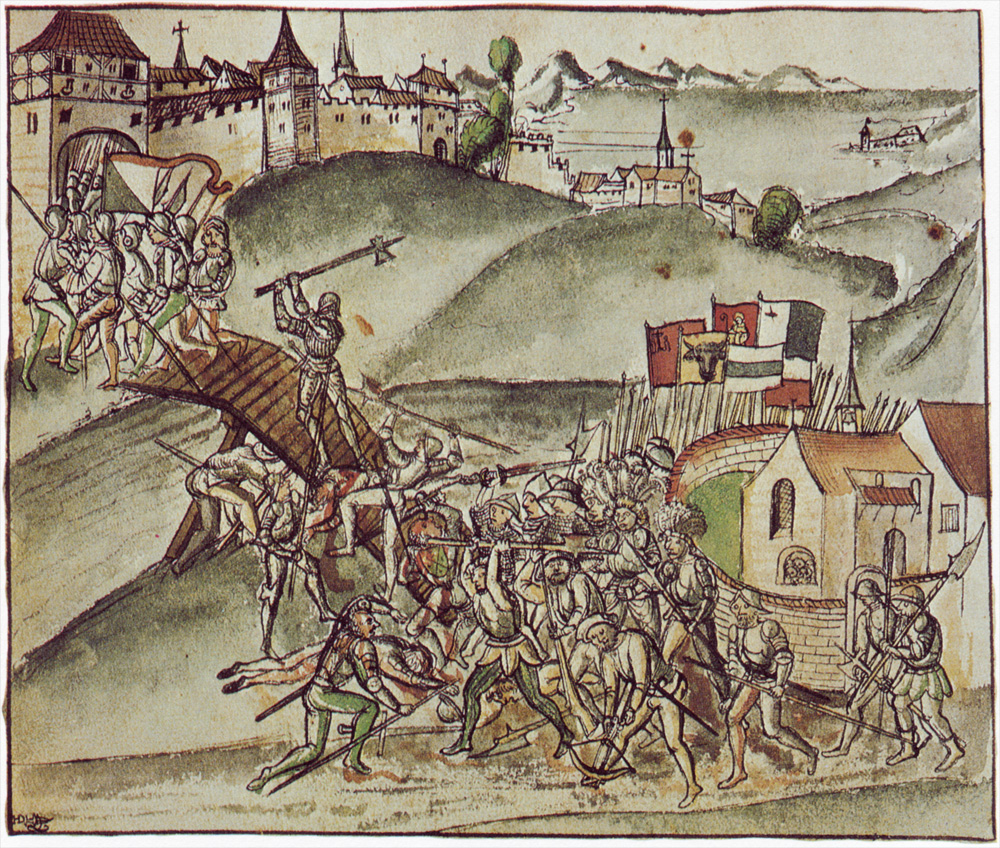
    The Battle of St. Jakob an der Sihl (1443) during the Old Zürich War
- Old Zürich War (1440–1446), after the death of count Frederick VII of Toggenburg
- Saxon Fratricidal War (1446–1451), after the death of landgrave Frederick IV of Thuringia
- Collapse of the Georgian realm (1446–1490), after the deaths of king Alexander I of Georgia and king Vakhtang IV
- Milanese War of Succession (1447–1454), after the death of duke Filippo Maria Visconti of the Duchy of Milan
- Scandinavian war of 1448–1471, after the death of king Christopher III of the Kalmar Union (Denmark, Sweden and Norway)
- Münster Diocesan Feud (1450–1457), after the death of prince-bishop Henry II of Moers
- Navarrese Civil War (1451–1455), after the death of Blanche I of Navarre and the usurpation of the throne by John II of Aragon
- Morea revolt of 1453–1454, a rebellion against Thomas Palaiologos who had conquered the Principality of Achaea and forced a marriage with Catherine Zaccaria
- Wars of the Roses (1455–1487), after the weakness of (and eventually the assassination of) king Henry VI of England
- War of the Neapolitan Succession (1458–1462), after the death of king Alfonso V of Aragon
  - Skanderbeg's Italian expedition (1460–1462)
- Cypriot war of succession (1460–1464), after the death of king John II of Cyprus
- Mainz Diocesan Feud (1461–1463), after the death of prince-bishop Dietrich Schenk von Erbach
- Hesse–Paderborn Feud (1462–1471), after the death of lord Rabe of Calenberg
- Catalan Civil War (1462–1472), after the death of crown prince Charles, Prince of Viana (1461) and the deposition of king John II of Aragon (1462) by the Consell del Principat, who offered the crown to several other pretenders instead
- War of the Succession of Stettin (1464–1529), after the death of duke Otto III of Pomerania
- Crimean war of succession (1466–1478), after the death of khan Hacı I Giray of the Crimean Khanate
- War of the Priests (1467–1479), after the death of prince-bishop Paul von Legendorf
- Burgundian conquest of Guelders (1473), after the death of duke Arnold of Egmont of Guelders; see also the 1459, 1465–1468, 1471–1473 rebellion of Adolf, Duke of Guelders against his father Arnold, Duke of Guelders
- Hessian Fratricidal War (1469–1470), after the 1458 death of Louis I, Landgrave of Hesse
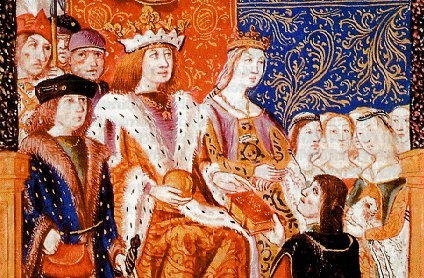
  The Catholic Monarchs united 'Spain' after the War of the Castilian Succession.
- War of the Castilian Succession (1475–1479), after the death of king Henry IV of Castile
- War of the Głogów Succession (1476–1482), after the death of duke Henry XI of Głogów
- War of the Burgundian Succession (1477–1482), after the death of duke Charles the Bold of Burgundy
  - Guelderian War of Independence (1477–1482, 1494–1499), after the death of duke Charles the Bold of Burgundy
- Ottoman war of succession (1481–1482), between prince Cem and prince Bayezid after the death of sultan Mehmet II
- Mad War (1485–1488), over the regency of the underage king Charles VIII of France after the death of king Louis XI
- French–Breton War (1487–1491), anticipating the childless death of duke Francis II of Brittany (died 1488). Essentially, it was a resumption of the War of the Breton Succession (1341–1364)
- Kazan war of succession (1479 or 1486 – 1487), after the death of khan Ibrahim of Kazan
- War of the Granada succession (1482–1492), after the deposition of emir Abu'l-Hasan Ali of Granada by his son Muhammad XI of Granada; the deposed emir's brother Muhammad XII of Granada also joined the fight. This succession conflict took place simultaneously with the Granada War, and was ended only by the Castilian conquest in 1492.
- Squire Francis War (1488–1490), last ignition of the Hook and Cod wars
- War of the Hungarian Succession (1490–1494), after the death of king Matthias Corvinus I of Hungary and Croatia
- Italian War of 1494–1495 or Italian War of Charles VIII, after the death of king Ferdinand I of Naples

== Early modern Europe ==
=== 16th century ===
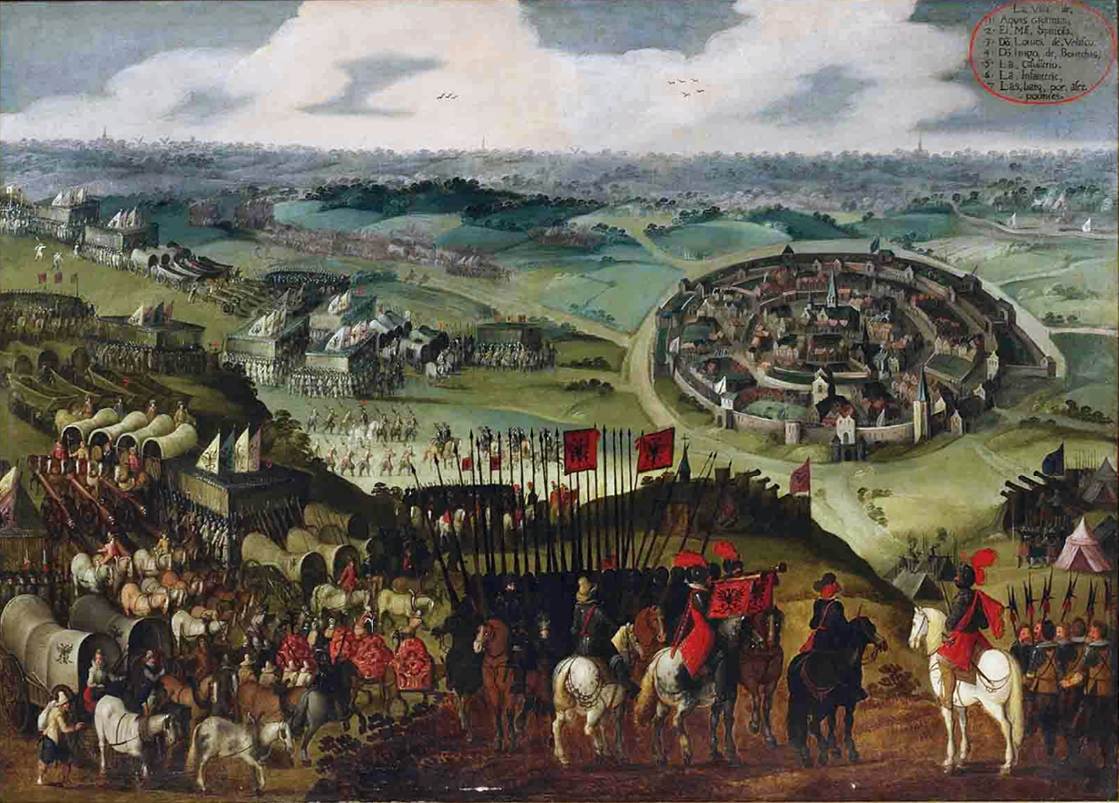
The Jülich Succession became a European war, as the future religious balance of power depended on it.

- War of the Katzenelnbogen Succession (1500–1557; German: Katzenelnbogener Erbfolgekrieg/Erbfolgestreit), after the death of count William III, Landgrave of Hesse
  - Hadamar succession struggle (1371–1557; German: Hadamarer Erbfolgestreit), after the 1368 death of regent Henry of Nassau-Hadamar and the insanity of nominal count Emicho III of Nassau-Hadamar. The conflict merged into the War of the Katzenelnbogen Succession.
- War of the Succession of Landshut (1503–1505), after the death of duke George of Bavaria-Landshut
- Ottoman Civil War (1509–1513), between prince Selim and prince Ahmed about the succession of sultan Bayezid II (died 1512)
- Russo-Kazan War (1521–1524), after the 1519 death of khan Möxämmädämin of Kazan, the 1519 Muscovite occupation of Kazan and the 1521 anti-Muscovite rebellion in Kazan, between the Muscovy-backed pretender Shah-Ali and the Crimea-backed pretender Sahib I Giray
- Danish Wars of Succession (1523–1537), a series of conflicts about the Danish throne within the House of Oldenburg
  - Danish War of Succession (1523–1524), because of dissatisfaction about the kingship of Christian II of Denmark, who was deposed; indirectly caused by the death of king John (Hans) of Denmark in 1513 (see also Siege of Copenhagen (1523))
  - Count's Feud (1533 or 1534 – 1536), after the death of king Frederick I of Denmark
- Little War in Hungary (1526–1568)
  - Little War in Hungary (1526–1538), after the death of king Louis II of Hungary and Croatia between Ottoman vassal-king John Zápolya of "Eastern Hungary" and king Ferdinand I of Habsburg of "Royal Hungary"
  - Little War in Hungary (1540–1547), after the death of Ottoman vassal-king John Zápolya of "Eastern Hungary" between his son and successor John Sigismund Zápolya and king Ferdinand I of Habsburg of "Royal Hungary". The first battle was the Siege of Buda (1541).
  - Hungarian war of succession (1564–1565), after the death of Emperor Ferdinand I of Habsburg, king of Hungary. The Transylvanian Diet declared war on his designated successor Maximilian II, but an Imperial army commanded by Lazarus von Schwendi invaded Transylvania and reached the river Szamos in March 1565, forcing John Sigismund Zápolya to conclude the Treaty of Szatmár (13 March 1565). In it, he renounced his title of king of Hungary in return for the recognition of his hereditary rule as prince of Transylvania under the Habsburg kings of Hungary, as well as agreeing to marry Maximilian's sister Joanna. Although it was soon annulled because John Sigismund joined the Ottomans in the Siege of Szigetvár against Maximilian, the Treaty of Speyer (1570) confirmed most terms.
- Italian War of 1536–1538, after the death of duke Francesco II Sforza of Milan
- Wyatt's rebellion (1553–1554), after recently acceded Mary I of England's decision to marry the non-English Catholic prince Philip II of Spain. See also Northumberland's insurrection (July 1553), after the death of king Edward VI of England and Ireland, which never became a war.
- Ottoman war of succession of 1559, between prince Selim and prince Bayezid over the succession of sultan Süleyman I
- Danzig rebellion (1575–1577), due to the disputed 1576 Polish–Lithuanian royal election
- War of the Portuguese Succession (1580–1583), after the death of king-cardinal Henry of Portugal. (António, Prior of Crato attempted to seize Lisbon again in 1589.)
- Cologne War (1583–1588), after the death of prince-bishop Salentin IX of Isenburg-Grenzau and the conversion of Gebhard Truchsess von Waldburg
- Struggles for the kingship of France in the late French Wars of Religion (1585–1598), as the House of Valois was set to die out
  - War of the Three Henrys (1585–1589), after the death of duke Francis of Anjou, the French heir-presumptive, and Protestant king Henry of Navarre's exclusion from the order of succession. Spain intervened in favour of the Catholic League, led by duke Henry of Guise. King Henry III of France was caught between the two.
  - Succession of Henry IV of France (1589–1594). King Henry of Navarre became king Henry IV of France after the death of both duke Henry of Guise and king Henry III of France. Spain continued to intervene, claiming the French throne for infanta Isabella Clara Eugenia instead. To appease Catholics, Henry IV converted to Catholicism in 1593, under the condition that Protestants be tolerated; his kingship was increasingly recognised in France.
  - Franco-Spanish War (1595–1598). King Henry IV of France, uniting French Protestants and Catholics, declared war on Spain directly to counter Spanish infanta Isabella Clara Eugenia's claim to the French throne.
- War of the Polish Succession (1587–88), after the death of king and grand duke Stephen Báthory of Poland–Lithuania
- Strasbourg Bishops' War (1592–1604), after the death of prince-bishop John IV of Manderscheid

=== 17th century ===
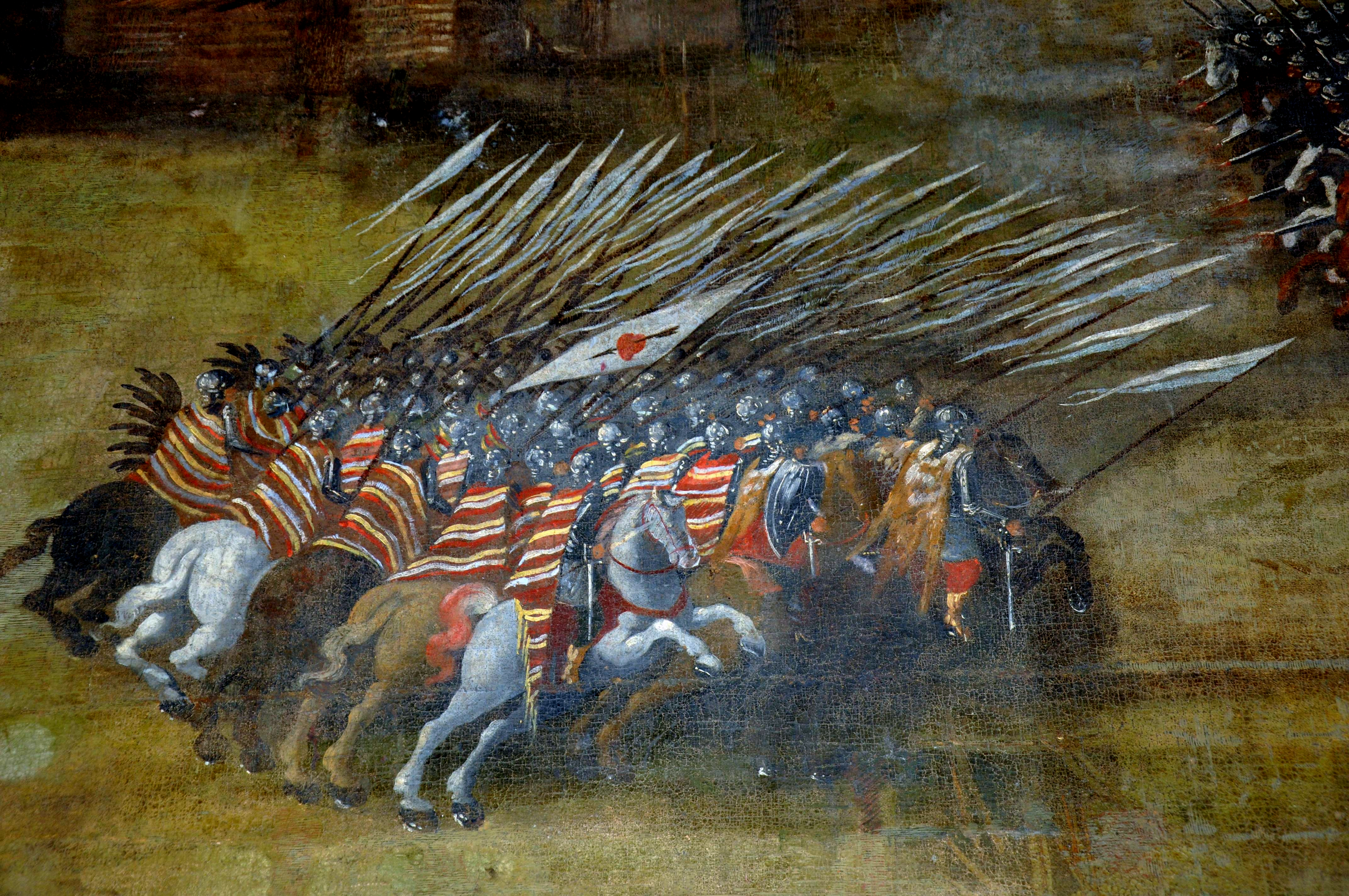
Klushino 1610: Polish–Lithuanian hussars defeat Tsarist Russia and capture Moscow in the Time of Troubles and the Dimitriads.

- Time of Troubles (1598–1613), after the death of tsar Feodor I of Russia
  - Polish–Muscovite War (1605–1618) or the Dimitriads, during which three False Dmitrys, imposters claiming to be Feodor's rightful successor, were advanced by the Polish–Lithuanian Commonwealth
- War of Deposition against Sigismund (1598–1599), after the death of king John III of Sweden
- Polish–Swedish War (1600–1629), originated from the War of Deposition against Sigismund
  - Note: the claim of Polish king John II Casimir Vasa (son of the deposed Sigismund) to the Swedish throne also played a significant role in the Second Northern War (1655–1660), and its renunciation was an important part of the Treaty of Oliva.
- Marburg Inheritance Dispute (1604–1648), after the death of Louis IV, Landgrave of Hesse-Marburg. The conflict essentially merged with the Thirty Years' War (1618–1648) and the Hessian War (1567 or 1645 – 1648), with the two claimants fighting on opposite sides.
- War of the Jülich Succession (1609–1614), after the death of duke John William of Jülich-Cleves-Berg
- War of the Montferrat Succession (1613–1617), after the death of duke Francesco IV Gonzaga
- War of the Mantuan Succession (1627–1631), after the death of duke Vincenzo II Gonzaga
- Piedmontese Civil War (1639–1642), after the death of duke Victor Amadeus I of Savoy
- Düsseldorf Cow War (1651), indirectly after the death of duke John William of Jülich-Cleves-Berg
- Austro-Turkish War (1663–1664), after the deposition of George II Rákóczi and a subsequent civil war
- War of Devolution (1667–1668), after the death of king Philip IV of Spain
- Moscow uprising of 1682 (or Streltsy uprising), after the death of tsar Feodor III of Russia
- Monmouth Rebellion (1685), after the death of king Charles II of England, Scotland and Ireland
- Argyll's Rising (1685), after the death of king Charles II of England, Scotland and Ireland
- English or Palatinate War of Succession, or Nine Years' War (1688–1697), after the Glorious Revolution, and with the death of elector Charles II of the Palatinate as the indirect cause
- The Jacobite risings (1688–1746) that tried to undo the Glorious Revolution and restore James II or his son James Francis Edward Stuart or grandson Charles Edward Stuart, as king of England, Scotland and Ireland
  - Williamite War in Ireland (1688–1691), war in Ireland between William III of Orange and James II Stuart
  - Scottish Jacobite rising (1689–1692), war in Scotland between William III of Orange and James II Stuart
- Streltsy uprising, the second uprising of the Streltsy against Peter I when he was in the great embassy

=== 18th century ===
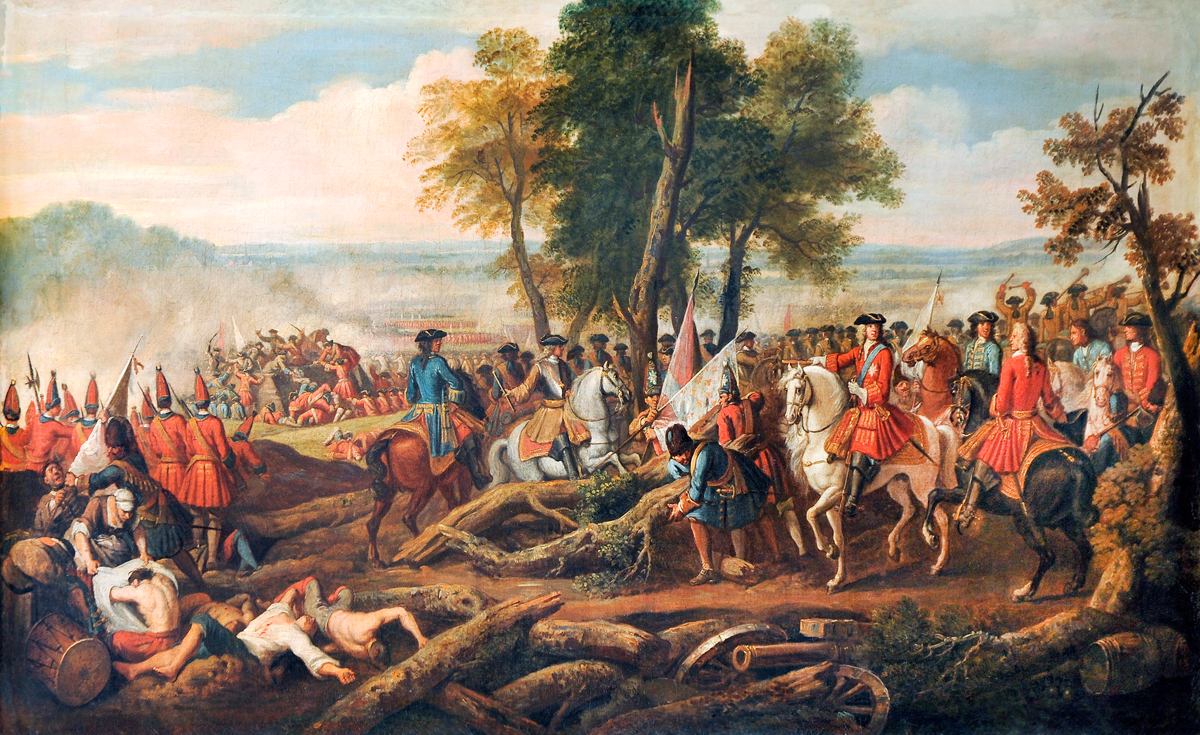
During the War of the Spanish Succession, a European coalition tried to keep Spain out of French hands.

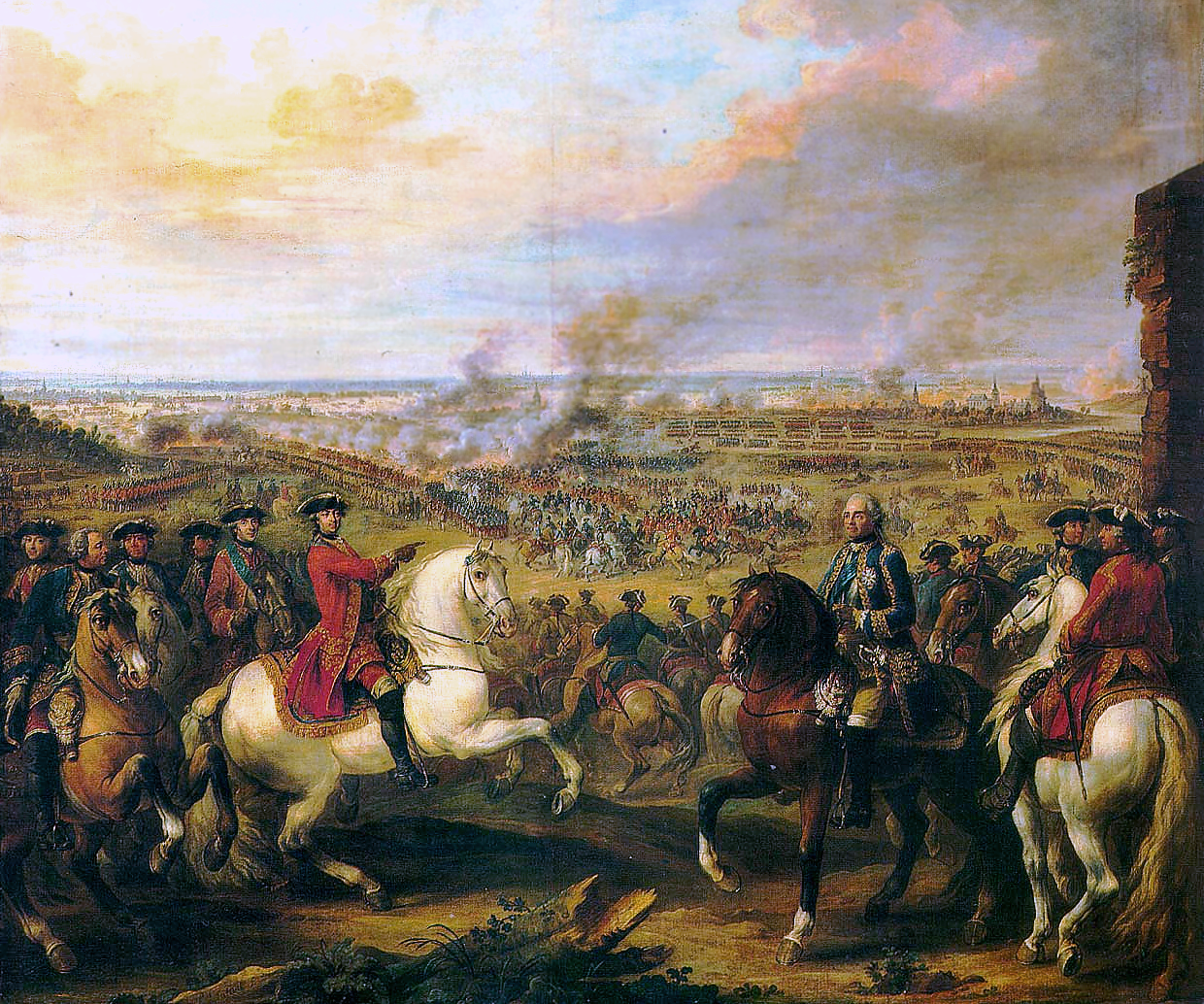
The War of the Austrian Succession grew out to an almost pan-European land war, spreading to colonies in the Americas and India.

- War of the Spanish Succession (1701–1714), after the death of king Charles II of Spain
- Gelderse Plooierijen (1702–1708), a period of low-level violence (sometimes characterised as a "war") in the Dutch Republic (especially Guelders) resulting directly from the death of stadtholder William III of Orange, which caused the Second Stadtholderless period. The conflict was not so much about the succession of William himself, but about who succeeded him in his right/privilege (obtained in 1675) to appoint local government officials after his death. This pitted the William-appointed Orangist "Oude Plooi" (loyal to the Orange dynasty) against the Staatsgezinde "Nieuwe Plooi" (striving towards a republic without the Orange stadtholderate).
  - William's death also triggered a dispute over the Principality of Orange which became a part of the War of the Spanish Succession.
- Civil war in Poland (1704–1706): during the Great Northern War (1700–1721), the Swedish army occupied much of the Polish–Lithuanian Commonwealth, dethroned king and grand duke Augustus II the Strong, and the pro-Swedish Warsaw Confederation convened a special Sejm which in 1704 elected Stanisław Leszczyński as the new king and grand duke; however, the anti-Swedish Sandomierz Coalition rejected Augustus' dethronement and Leszczyński's election, and declared war on Sweden and the Warsaw Confederation.
- Jacobite rising of 1715 (1715–1716), after the death of heiress-presumptive Sophia of Hanover and queen Anne of Great Britain
- War of the Quadruple Alliance (1717 or 1718 – 1720), continuation of the War of the Spanish Succession because Philip V of Spain refused to renounce his rights to Sardinia and Sicily that he had ceded to Austria at the 1713–1715 Peace of Utrecht
- War of the Polish Succession (1733–1738), after the death of king Augustus II the Strong of Poland
  - Bourbon conquest of the Two Sicilies (1734–1735), an invasion by Charles of Bourbon, Duke of Parma to regain Naples and Sicily making it a continuation of the War of the Quadruple Alliance.
- War of the Austrian Succession (1740–1748), after the death of archduke Charles VI of Austria
  - First Silesian War (1740–1742), Prussian invasion and ensuing Central European theatre of the war
  - Second Silesian War (1744–1745), renewed Prussian invasion and continuation of First Silesian War
  - Russo-Swedish War (1741–1743), Swedish and Russian participation in the War of the Austrian Succession
- Jacobite rising of 1745 (1745–1746), attempt to regain the thrones of Great Britain (by then England and Scotland had united, though this was not recognised by the Jacobites) and Ireland by the last serious Jacobite pretender. France provided limited support to Charles Edward Stuart's invasion of Great Britain.
- Third Silesian War (1756–1763), continuation of the Second Silesian War due to unresolved inheritance rights disputes over Silesia between Austria and Prussia
- War of the Bavarian Succession (1778–1779), after the death of elector Maximilian III Joseph of Bavaria

== Modern Europe ==
=== 19th century ===
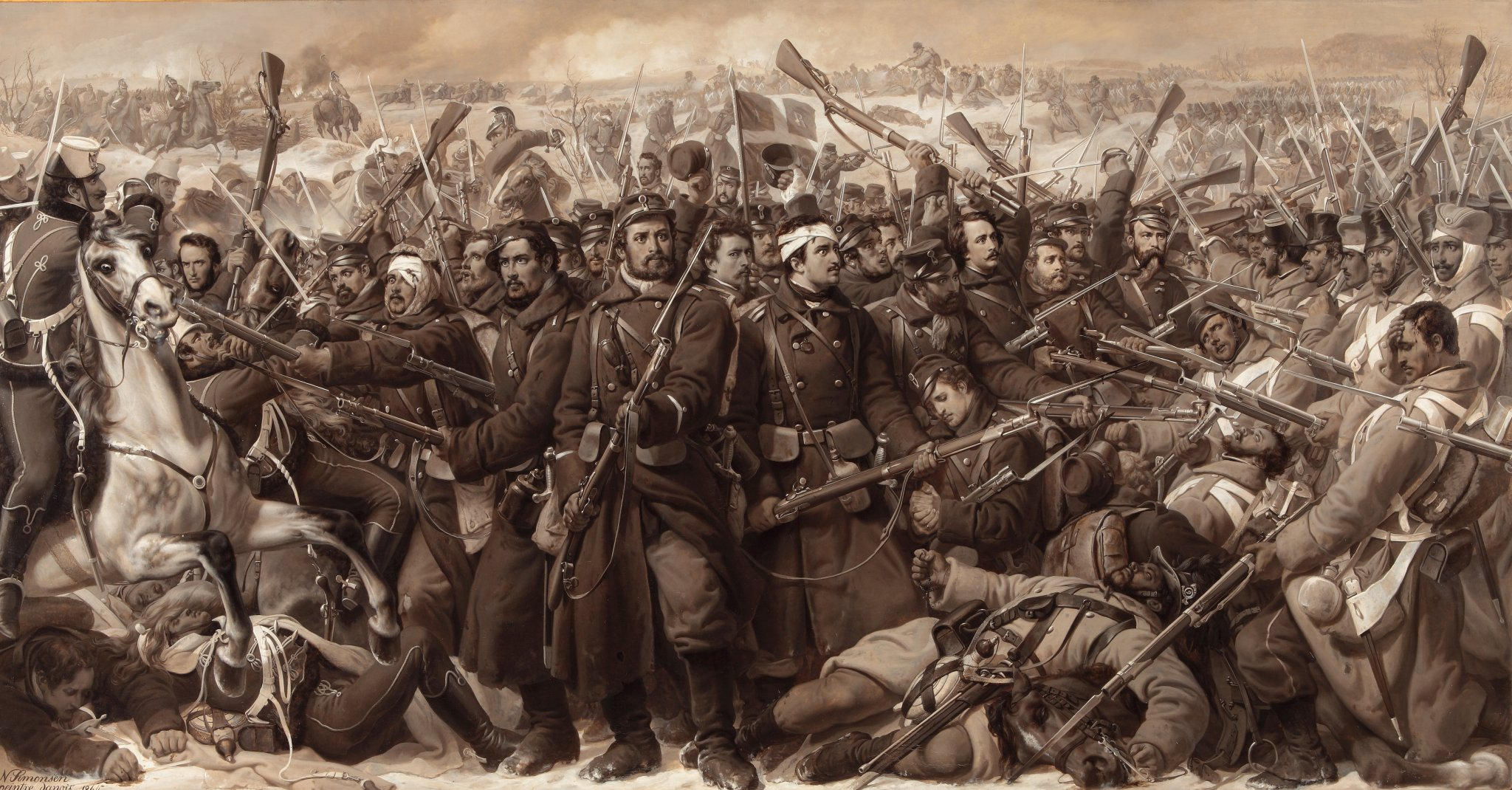
The death of Frederick VII of Denmark was a cause of the Second Schleswig War (1864).

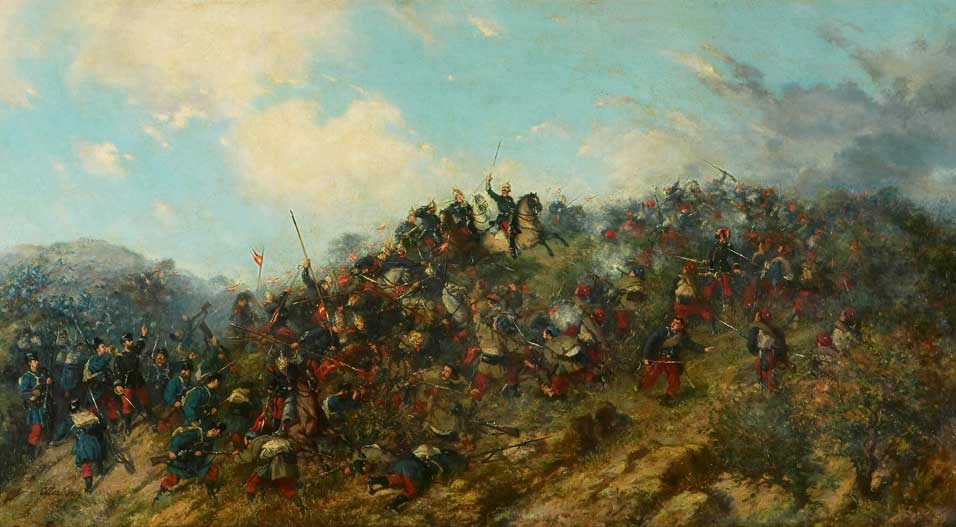
The Third Carlist War (1872–1876).

- Peninsular War (1808–1814), triggered by a revolt against Charles IV and a following intervention by Napoleon to force both Charles and his heir Ferdinand to abdicate in favour of his brother Joseph Bonaparte.
- Russian interregnum of 1825 (1825–1826), after the death of tsar Alexander I of Russia, who had secretly changed the order of succession from his brother Constantine in favour of his younger brother Nicholas, neither of whom wanted to rule. Two related but different rebel movements arose to offer their solution to the succession crisis: the aristocratic Petersburg-based group favoured a constitutional monarchy under Constantine, the democratic Kiev-based group of Pavel Pestel called for the establishment of a republic.
  - Decembrist revolt (December 1825), by the aristocratic Decembrists in Saint Petersburg
  - Chernigov Regiment revolt (January 1826), by the republican Decembrists in Ukraine
- Liberal Wars, also Miguelist War or Portuguese Civil War (1828–1834), after the death of king John VI of Portugal
- The Carlist Wars, especially the First. Later Carlist Wars were more ideological in nature (against modernism)
  - First Carlist War (1833–1839), after the death of king Ferdinand VII of Spain
  - Second Carlist War (1846–1849), a small-scale uprising in protest against the marriage of Isabella II with someone else than the Carlist pretender Carlos Luis de Borbón
  - Third Carlist War (1872–1876), after the coronation of king Amadeo I of Spain
  - (sometimes included) Spanish Civil War (1936–1939), in which both Carlist and Bourbonist monarchists vied to restore the monarchy (abolished in 1931) in favour of their own dynasty
- First Schleswig War (1848–1852), partially caused by the death of king Christian VIII of Denmark
- Second Schleswig War (1864), partially caused by the death of king Frederick VII of Denmark
- Franco-Prussian War (1870–1871), directly caused by the Spanish succession crisis following the Glorious Revolution of 1868. (Note: An 1870 issue of the Dutch periodical Onze Tijd ("Our Time") went as far as to name it the Tweede Spaansche Successieoorlog ("Second War of the Spanish Succession", as opposed to the "first" in 1701–1715), stating: "Although already in 1866 anyone who had been keeping a clear eye on the state of affairs should have considered a war between France and Prussia inevitable, one would likely have looked in every other place for the direct cause of that war before Spain. (...) So strange, that it is evident that finding it in the Spanish succession was the result of a monarch just looking for any kind of pretext to declare war.")

== Timeline ==
- British Isles
- Scandinavia, Baltics & Eastern Europe
- Low Countries
- Central Europe (HRE)
- France & Italy
- Spain & Portugal
- Southeastern Europe

== See also ==
- Ottoman dynasty § Succession practices (including royal fratricide)
- Diocesan feud
- Political mutilation in Byzantine culture

== Bibliography ==
- Barta, Gábor; Granasztói, György (1981). "A három részre szakadt ország és a török kiűzése (1526–1605)". In Benda, Kálmán; Péter, Katalin (eds.). Magyarország történeti kronológiája, II: 1526–1848 [Historical Chronology of Hungary, Volume I: 1526–1848] (in Hungarian). Akadémiai Kiadó. pp. 361–430. ISBN 963-05-2662-X.
- Boffa, Sergio (2004). Warfare in Medieval Brabant, 1356-1406. Woodbridge: Boydell Press. ISBN 978-1843830610.
- Jaques, Tony (2007). Dictionary of Battles and Sieges: F-O. Santa Barbara: Greenwood Publishing Group. ISBN 9780313335389.
- Kohn, George Childs (2013). Dictionary of Wars. Revised Edition. Londen/New York: Routledge. ISBN 9781135954949.
- Kokkonen, Andrej; Sundell, Anders (September 2017). "The King is Dead: Political Succession and War in Europe, 1000–1799" (PDF). Qog Working Paper Series. Gothenburg: University of Gothenburg: 51. ISSN 1653-8919.
  - (Appendix) Kokkonen, Andrej; Sundell, Anders (September 2017). Online supplementary appendix for "The King is Dead: Political Succession and War in Europe, 1000–1799" (PDF). Gothenburg: University of Gothenburg. p. 40.
- Luard, Evan (1992). "Succession". The Balance of Power. London: Palgrave Macmillan. pp. 149–150. doi:10.1007/978-1-349-21927-8_6. ISBN 978-1-349-21929-2.
- Martin, Janet (1995). Medieval Russia, 980–1584. Cambridge: Cambridge University Press. p. 450. ISBN 9780521368322.
  - Martin, Janet (2007). Medieval Russia: 980–1584. Second Edition. E-book. Cambridge: Cambridge University Press. ISBN 978-0-511-36800-4.
- Nolan, Cathal J. (2006). The Age of Wars of Religion, 1000–1650: An Encyclopedia of Global Warfare and Civilization, Volume 2. London: Greenwood Publishing Group. p. 1076. ISBN 978-0313337345.
- Nolan, Cathal J. (2008). Wars of the Age of Louis XIV, 1650–1715: An Encyclopedia of Global Warfare and Civilization: An Encyclopedia of Global Warfare and Civilization. London: Greenwood Press. p. 214. ISBN 9780313359200.
- Reuter, Timothy (1995). The New Cambridge Medieval History: Volume 3, c.900–c.1024. Cambridge: Cambridge University Press. p. 891. ISBN 9780521364478.
- Wyrozumski, Jerzy (1986). Historia Polski do roku 1505 (History of Poland until 1505). Warszawa: Państwowe Wydawnictwo Naukowe (Polish Scientific Publishers PWN). ISBN 83-01-03732-6.
