= Utrecht Schism =

Diocesan feud

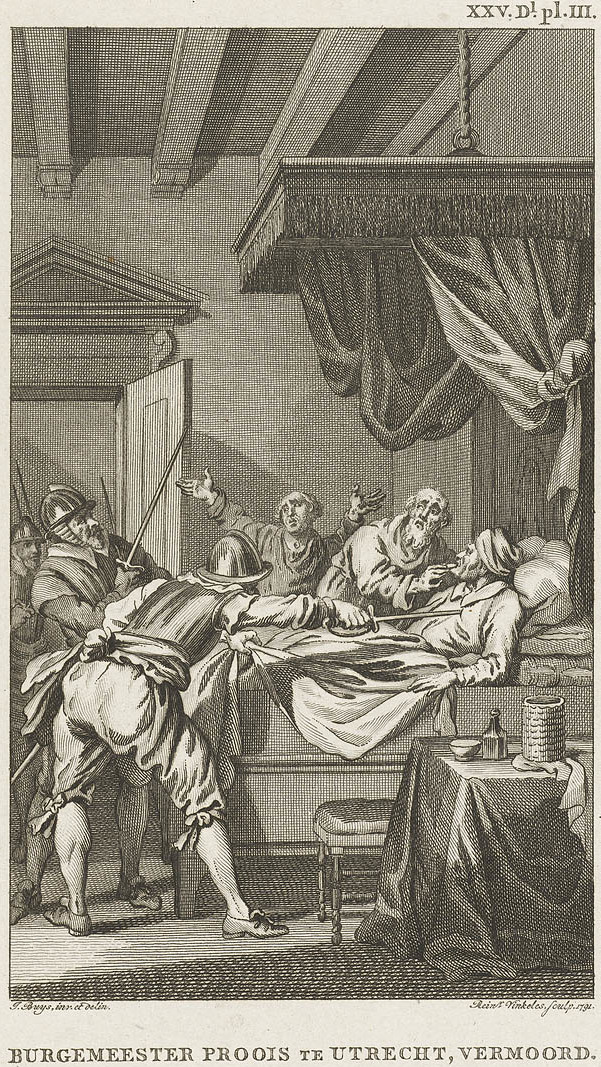
- 18th-century image by Reinier Vinkeles and Jacobus Buys of the assassination of mayor Proys.
| Date | 1423 – 1449 |
| Location | Prince-Bishopric of Utrecht |
| Result | Lichtenberger victory |

Belligerents
| Lichtenbergers; Hook league Proysen; Papal States (1432–1449) | Lokhorsten; Cod league Duchy of Burgundy; Duchy of Guelders (1423–1429); Papal States (1423–1432); Council of Basel & Antipope Felix V (1431–1449) |

Commanders and leaders
| Rudolf van Diepholt; Beernt Proys † | Raban of Helmstatt (1423–1425); Zweder van Culemborg (1425–1433); Walraven van Meurs (1433–1449) |

The Utrecht Schism (Dutch: Utrechts Schisma) was a diocesan feud in the Prince-Bishopric of Utrecht from 1423 to 1449. The legitimate prince-bishop of Utrecht was at issue. The war of succession was fought by Zweder van Culemborg and his brother Walraven van Meurs against Rudolf van Diepholt. The conflict mixed with the existing Utrecht factionalism between the Lichtenbergers and Lokhorsten (called 'Gunterlingen' until 1413) and with the Hook and Cod wars raging in the County of Holland. Some scholars consider the Utrecht Schism to have ended in 1429.

== Background ==
The Concordat of Worms (1122) stipulated that bishops in the Holy Roman Empire, to which the Prince-Bishopric of Utrecht belonged, should be elected by the church chapters and no longer appointed by the emperors, as had been customary since the introduction of the Imperial Church System until the Investiture Controversy. From the 13th century onwards, most chapters lost their right to vote and only the cathedral chapters were still allowed to elect the bishop, but in Utrecht this developed differently: aside from St. Martin's Cathedral, the chapters of the Old Munster Church, St. Peter's Church, St. John's church and St. Mary's Church retained their voting rights. These five chapters were part of the States of Nedersticht, and as such, they had influence on the government. Each chapter was made up out of a number of canons; in the case of St. John's there were twenty. In theory, these canons had the freedom to choose whichever candidate-bishop they liked, but in practice they were under the influence (by means of bribery or blackmail, for example) of neighbouring princes, especially the Count of Holland, the Count and later Duke of Guelders and eventually also the rising Duke of Burgundy, to opt for a candidate they had nominated. As the eventual winner was usually already quite old and also passed away relatively soon again, the Prince-Bishopric of Utrecht experienced many more power transfers than the realms surrounding it, where due to the principle of hereditary succession a deceased count or duke was usually succeeded by his much younger son. Moreover, since the 14th century, the Popes had been trying to increasingly overrule the chapters by ignoring their choices, and claiming the exclusive right to appoint all bishops themselves.

== Course ==
=== Episcopal election (1423–1425) ===
Upon the death of prince-bishop Frederick of Blankenheim on 9 October 1423, a dispute arose about his succession. The day after his passing, messengers were sent forth to the neighbouring principalities, informing them that the episcopal see of Utrecht had become vacant and a successor was sought. The same day the five chapters (jointly known as the 'General Chapter') held a meeting to determine the date of the election. Initially the cathedral chapter could not agree with the other four chapters, but on 16 October the cathedral chapter conceded and settled on 9 November as election day. Meanwhile, many princes with their entourage convened in the city of Utrecht to present their candidates. Next, the princes and their candidates left the city at the magistrate's instructions. Previously the magistrate had adopted an act that stipulated all interested parties should be outside the city during the election in order to reduce any pressure they might exert on the electors.

- The archbishop of Cologne nominated his brother Walraven van Meurs
- The prince-bishop of Liège nominated John of Buren, provost of Aachen
- The prince-bishop of Münster nominated his cousin Albert of Hoya
- Duke Adolf of Jülich-Berg nominated Gerhard of Cleves (brother of the Duke of Cleves?)
- The Duke of Cleves nominated his relative Rudolf van Diepholt, canon in Cologne and provost of Osnabrück
- Zweder van Culemborg, cathedral provost of Utrecht, was supported by his relative Arnold of Egmont, who was fighting the Second War of the Guelderian Succession against Duke Adolf of Jülich-Berg at the time, which Arnold would eventually win.

The ruling Lichtenbergers and Hooks rallied to the camp of Rudolf; he was supported by the six main cities of Utrecht (Utrecht city, Amersfoort, Deventer, Kampen, Zwolle and Groningen city) and the knighthood, thus receiving the majority of the canons' votes. The Lokhorsten had chosen the party of Zweder van Culemborg, but he and his brother Walraven van Meurs failed to get enough votes. Pope Martin V was very unsatisfied with the results so he ignored the election of Rudolf and instead set his sights on Raban of Helmstatt, the prince-bishop of Speyer, whom he appointed as the bishop of Utrecht on 7 July 1424. Raban (Latin: Rhabanus) himself actually didn't really feel like it: he was already quite old, and knew that Rudolf could count on the loyalty of most Utrechters, and had already gained hold of most cities and fortresses in the bishopric, meaning that it would require a tough war to secure the see. Zweder, who had initially accepted Rudolf's election, exploited this to his advantage by persuading Raban to step down and the pope to appoint him in Raban's place. Raban agreed and resigned, and after Zweder paid the papal court 4000 ducats, pope Martin appointed him as bishop in 1425.

=== Urban combat in Utrecht (1425–1426) ===
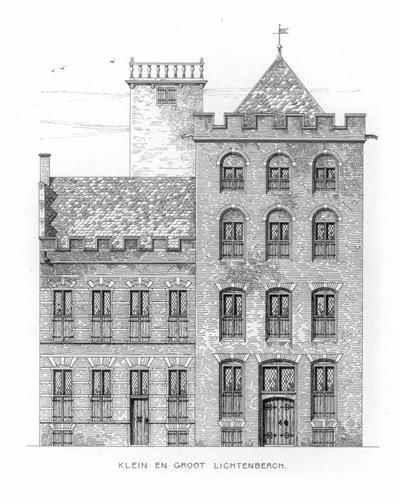
The Lichtenberg houses in medieval central Utrecht.

The States of Oversticht vehemently opposed the appointment of Zweder, and remained loyal to Rudolf, who proceeded to establish himself in Oversticht. On the other hand, the States of Nedersticht wavered in their opposition against Rome, and on 20 July 1425, they allowed the procurator of Zweder to enter the city, while the General Chapter declared that it would obey the papal letters instructing them to accept Zweder. Zweder had the towns of Rhenen and Amersfoort occupied, and announced that he intended to have himself sworn in inside the city of Utrecht on 21 August; he convinced the magistrate to cooperate through nice promises. At that time, the faction of Lichtenbergers, Proysen and Hook noblemen were the leading party in the city; they had sided with Rudolf. Their political adversaries, the Lokhorsten, had been banished from the capital, and members of the powerful Utrecht guilds rallied to either faction as the crisis escalated. The Lokhorsten, the Cod noblemen, Burgundy and Guelders constituted Zweder's camp.

On the occasion of his inauguration on 21 August 1425, Zweder van Culemborg permitted some banished Lokhorsten to return to the city, as had been agreed with the magistrate in the spirit of reconciliation. However, one Lokhorster whom the magistrate had explicitly excluded from the amnesty arrangement also made his appearance, breaching the deal. The magistrate promptly had the man arrested, infuriating the Lokhorsten. That night after the incident, the Lokhorsten stormed the prison and liberated their arrested comrade. Euphoric about their success, the Lokhorsten decided, probably with Zweder's approval, to settle the scores with the Lichtenbergers by committing a coup d'état. The mayor of Utrecht, the Lichtenberg-aligned Beernt Proys, was murdered by pro-Lokhorst butchers with their knives as he lay ill in bed in his own house. The same night, other Lichtenbergers were killed or expelled from the city, while their homes were plundered.

One year later, in 1426, a number of Lichtenberger noblemen and burghers managed to sneak into the city gates, disguised as monks. The Lokhorsten, including the butchers, armed and formed up on the town hall square called De Plaats (nowadays De Stadhuisbrug), but were defeated by the Lichtenbergers, who chased them away across the city walls. Next, Zweder van Culemborg was ousted out of the capital, after which Rudolf van Diepholt came back from Oversticht and set up his court in Utrecht, where the Lichtenbergers and Proysen restored their position as the dominant faction.

=== Guelderian military intervention (1426–1429) ===
The Guelderians occupied Amersfoort for Zweder (a relative of Guelders' duke Arnold of Egmont), but Rudolf soon retook the town. Zweder had to retreat from Nedersticht towards Arnhem. Rudolf's troops proceeded to plunder the Veluwe, leading the Guelderians to burn down Amerongen and environs in retaliation. Rudolf's forces defeated the Guelderians in the Battle of Maurik, and then laid siege to Tiel, without success. In 1428 a ceasefire was agreed, and in 1429 Guelders concluded a separate peace with Rudolf; meanwhile Arnold still had a tough war against Jülich–Berg on his hands and couldn't afford to maintain his intervention. With Guelders having withdrawn from the conflict, Rudolf had pretty much achieved military victory, although a diplomatic dispute remained for the next 20 years.

=== Diplomatic conclusion (1429–1449) ===
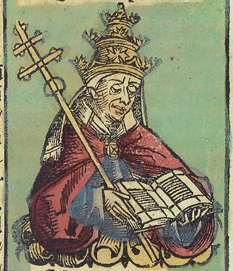
Pope Eugenius IV

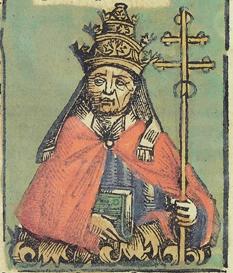
Antipope Felix V

The rejection of a pope-appointed bishop caused several ecclesiastical punitive measures which affected the city of Utrecht amongst others. For example, it was henceforth prohibited to perform certain Catholic baptism and wedding rituals in the capital, but the inhabitants ignored the papal restrictions. Many members of monasteries loyal to Rome fled the city from 1427 onwards. Pope Martin V died in 1431; his successor Pope Eugenius IV officially recognised Rudolf van Diepholt as bishop in 1432. There was little Zweder could do about the situation; he had retreated Overijssel, and as a meagre consolation, Eugenius appointed him as 'titular' bishop of Caesarea (a destroyed city in the Holy Land which the Crusaders had already abandoned two centuries earlier). However, the Council of Basel came into conflict with Eugenius and continued recognising Zweder; after the latter's death in 1433, these clerics appointed Zweder's brother Walraven van Meurs as the new bishop. The conflict between Eugenius and the Council escalated such that in 1439 the latter elected Antipope Felix V, who confirmed their choice for Walraven. Nevertheless, Walraven never succeeded in realising his claims, and eventually renounced them. The Utrecht Schism ended around 1449, when Walraven van Meurs abandoned his claim to the episcopal see, and Rudolf van Diepholt was universally accepted as the bishop of Utrecht.

== Aftermath ==
When Walraven's brother, the Münster prince-bishop Henry II of Moers, died on 2 June 1450, Walraven nominated himself as a candidate, while Rudolf nominated his nephew Koenraad van Diepholt. Walraven was elected, and sufficiently satisfied with this outcome to let the diocese of Utrecht pass. However, an opposing candidate, Eric of Hoya, could not accept his defeat, and declared war on Walraven, triggering the Münster Diocesan Feud (1450–1457), in which both Walraven and Rudolf would again participate.

When Rudolf died in 1455, Gijsbrecht van Brederode was elected as his successor. But because the Burgundian duke Philip the Good insisted on his bastard son David of Burgundy becoming the prince-bishop of Utrecht, this dispute led to the Utrecht war (1456–1458).

== See also ==
- Factionalism in the medieval Low Countries
