= Reichskirche =

Reichskirche may refer to:

- Imperial church system in the Holy Roman Empire (963–1803)
- German Evangelical Church, a Protestant church in Nazi Germany (1933–1945)
