= Zweder van Culemborg =

Bishop of Utrecht

- Titular Bishop of Caesarea in Palaestina
- Church: Catholic Church
- See: Caesarea in Palaestina
- In office: 10 December 1432 – 21 September 1433
- Predecessor: Sigismund Albicus
- Successor: Guterio Gómez
- Previous post: Bishop of Utrecht (1425-1432)

Orders
- Consecration: 1 August 1425

Personal details
- Died: 21 September 1433 Basel, Prince-Bishopric of Basel, Upper Rhenish Circle, Holy Roman Empire

Zweder van Culemborg (or Kuilenburg) (died 21 September 1433) was bishop of Utrecht during the Utrecht Schism.

Culemborg coat of arms

After the death of bishop Frederik III van Blankenheim in 1423, a succession-conflict had emerged between the two candidates for the bishopric's seat; Zweder van Culemborg and Rudolf van Diepholt. In order to end the conflict, pope Martin V nominated his own favourite, Raban von Helmstatt to the bishopric in 1422. But Raban declined the nomination, after which the pope appointed Zweder on 6 February 1425. Rudolf refused to accept this, and Zweder had to use violence to get his authority recognised. However, he was driven out of the city of Utrecht in 1426 by his opponents. As a result, Rudolf was excommunicated by the pope, but he nonetheless managed to maintain himself, even though Zweder was initially supported by the duke of Guelders and Philip the Good, who was also count of Holland. But Rudolf was able to sign treaties with neighbouring rulers, after which pope Eugene IV, Martin V's successor, appointed Zweder to the titular bishopric of Caesarea Maritima and recognised Rudolf as bishop of Utrecht on 10 December 1432. Zweder complained about this at the Council of Basel, which ruled in his favor, but he died in Basel shortly after.

== Sources ==
This information is partly based on De Katholieke Encyclopaedie (Amsterdam, 1938)

Preceded by Frederik III van Blankenheim	Bishop of Utrecht; 1423–1433	Succeeded by Rudolf van Diepholt
