= Factionalism in the medieval Low Countries =

Ideological divides in Dutch history

Factionalism in the medieval Low Countries, in Dutch historiography known as partijstrijd or (partij)twisten, comprises several political, military and socio-economic conflicts in the Low Countries during the Middle Ages, especially the Late Middle Ages (circa 1300 to 1500). The so-called 'parties' (Dutch: partijen) usually behaved like factions, which were formed ad hoc, could rapidly change in composition, and usually did not have strong ideological underpinnings. They were not officially organised political parties as would emerge in the 19th century. The parties were normally led by an aristocratic clan (which usually gave the faction its name), followed by patrician families, and eventually several groups from the bourgeoisie, generally organised by guilds. These groups could often switch allegiances, names and goals, secede or defect, depending on how situations and interests evolved. Usually there were long-term tensions and only brief military confrontations, which either resulted in a new balance of power, or confirmed the status quo. The ruling dynasties or bishops could be dependent on the support from the strongest faction in order to govern, and in case of a war of succession, pretenders were compelled to ally themselves with one party or the other to stand a chance as seizing power. Foreign powers could interfere in factionalist struggles by providing financial or military support, and sometimes take over control of a province with the help of a local party.

Some well-known examples of factionalism in the medieval Low Countries were:

- Frisian lands (Friesland, the Ommelanden and Groningen): between Schieringers and Vetkopers, see Vetkopers and Schieringers (1325–1524)
- Duchy of Guelders: between Van Heeckeren and Van Bronckhorst (1348–1379)
- County of Holland: between the Hook league and the Cod league, see Hook and Cod wars (1350–1490)
- Prince-Bishopric of Liège: between Awans and Waroux, see Awans and Waroux War (1296–1335)
- Prince-Bishopric of Utrecht: between Lichtenbergers and Lokhorsten (known as Gunterlingen until 1413), previously also Fresingen (13th–16th century), see for example the Utrecht Schism of the 15th century
- County of Flanders: between leliaards and liebaards/klauwaarts (13th–14th century), for example the Franco-Flemish War (1297–1305) and the 1323–1328 Flemish revolt

== See also ==
- List of wars in the Low Countries until 1560
- List of political groups in the French Revolution
- Chiroux and Grignoux, 17th-century factionalism in the Prince-Bishopric of Liège
- Gelderse Plooierijen, 18th-century factionalism in the Duchy of Guelders inside the Dutch Republic between Orangists (Oude Plooi) and the Dutch States Party (Nieuwe Plooi)
- Loevestein faction, 17th-century faction in especially the County of Holland inside the Dutch Republic
- Patriottentijd, late 18th-century factionalism in the entire Dutch Republic
- Vonckists and Statists, 1790 factionalism in the United Belgian States
- Guelphs and Ghibellines, late medieval factionalism in northern Italy
