= Frederick of Blankenheim =

Bishop of Strasbourg and Utrecht

- Bishop of Utrecht
- Church: Catholic Church
- Diocese: Utrecht
- In office: 1393–1423
- Predecessor: Floris van Wevelinkhoven
- Successor: Utrecht Schism; Rudolf van Diepholt; Zweder van Culemborg
- Previous posts: Bishop of Strasbourg

Personal details
- Born: c. 1355
- Died: 9 October 1423

Frederick of Blankenheim (c. 1355 – Castle Ter Horst (Loenen), 9 October 1423) served as Bishop of Strasbourg from 1375 to 1393 and then as Bishop of Utrecht from 1393 until his death in 1423.

== Strasbourg and Utrecht ==
Frederik van Blankenheim studied law in Paris and was named bishop of Strasbourg in 1375. His reign was not a success, and with help from William I of Guelders and Jülich he was transferred to Utrecht, where he proved to be an able ruler. Supported by the Lichtenbergers faction, he managed to maintain his rights over the cities in the bishoprics, the local nobility and the surrounding counties of Holland and Guelders. He strengthened ecclesiastical authority in the Oversticht and forced the city of Groningen to recognise his authority. In 1407 he granted city rights to Coevorden.

== Wars ==
As ally of William VI, Count of Holland, he took part in the Arkel-war of 1406, through which he gained possession of Hagestein. The Hollandic faction-struggle around Jacqueline, Countess of Hainaut forced the aged bishop to fight a war with Holland and Guelders from 1419 to 1422, in which the bishopric was barely able to keep itself standing.

== Church matters ==
Frederik did not personally deal with churchely matters, instead letting a well-organised administration deal with it. His suffragan bishop was Hubertus Schenck (titular bishop of Hippus in Palestine). He was a protector of the Modern Devotion, embodied in the Brethren of the Common Life.

== Death ==
Frederik van Blankenheim died on October 9, 1423, and was buried in the Dom Church.

Catholic Church titles
Preceded by Lamprecht von Brunn	Bishop of Strasbourg as Frederick II; 1375–1393	Succeeded by Ludwig von Thierstein
Preceded by Floris van Wevelinkhoven	Bishop of Utrecht as Frederick III; 1393–1423	Succeeded by Utrecht Schism; Rudolf van Diepholt; Zweder van Culemborg
