= Diocesan feud =

Warlike conflict

A diocesan feud (German: Stiftsfehde) is either a warlike conflict between two contenders for the election of a prince-bishop, ruler of a bishopric or archbishopric in the Holy Roman Empire, or an armed conflict between two parties within such a territory. The introduction of the Imperial Church System in the 10th century had intended the position of prince-bishops to be non-hereditary, as all Catholic clergymen were required to be celibate and thus could not produce legitimate offspring to inherit their possessions. Instead, the Holy Roman Emperor would appoint one of his confidants as prince-bishop, upon whose death he could choose a successor himself. However, after the decline of imperial authority over clerical appointments due to the Investiture Controversy (1076–1122), ending with the Concordat of Worms, the cathedral chapters started electing the bishops, and their choice had to be confirmed by the metropolitan bishop. In the 14th century, the Holy See began to reserve the appointment of certain bishops to itself, after which the pope (himself the bishop of Rome) gradually laid claim to the exclusive right to appoint all bishops everywhere.

In practice, all candidates to succeed a deceased prince-bishop, as well as the members of the cathedral chapters which were entitled to vote for these candidates, were either part of powerful aristocratic dynasties or, more commonly, the lesser German nobility (by and large families of Imperial Knights) which sought to de facto add these prince-bishoprics to their Hausmacht. In some cases, especially in the late Middle Ages (between 1300 and 1500), the result of the election did not satisfy one of the contending parties, and military conflicts ensued, which have become known as diocesan feuds, that bear a lot of similarities to wars of succession.

The best known examples in the Holy Roman Empire were the:

- Aquileian War of the Succession (1381–1388)
- Bremen Diocesan Feud (1258–59)
- Cologne Diocesan Feud (1473–1480)
- Cologne War (1583–1588), also a war of religion
- Hildesheim Diocesan Feud (1519–1523)
- Mainz Diocesan Feud (1461–62)
- Münster Diocesan Feud (1450–1457)
- Strasbourg Bishops' War (1592–1604), also a war of religion
- Utrecht Schism (1423–1449)
- Utrecht war (1456–1458)
- Utrecht war of 1481–83 (German: Utrechter Stiftsfehde)

An example of a diocesan feud outside the Holy Roman Empire was the War of the Priests (1467–1479) in the Prince-Bishopric of Warmia, a semi-independent state under the mixed protection of the State of the Teutonic Order and the Kingdom of Poland. The Nine Years' War (1688–1697) was partially caused by the Diocesan feud over the Electorate of Cologne.
