= Raban von Helmstatt =

Archbishop-Elector of Trier

- Archbishop-Elector of Trier
- Church: Catholic Church
- Archdiocese: Trier
- In office: 1430–1438
- Predecessor: Otto von Ziegenhain
- Successor: Jakob I von Sierck

Personal details
- Born: c. 1362
- Died: 4 November 1439 Speyer

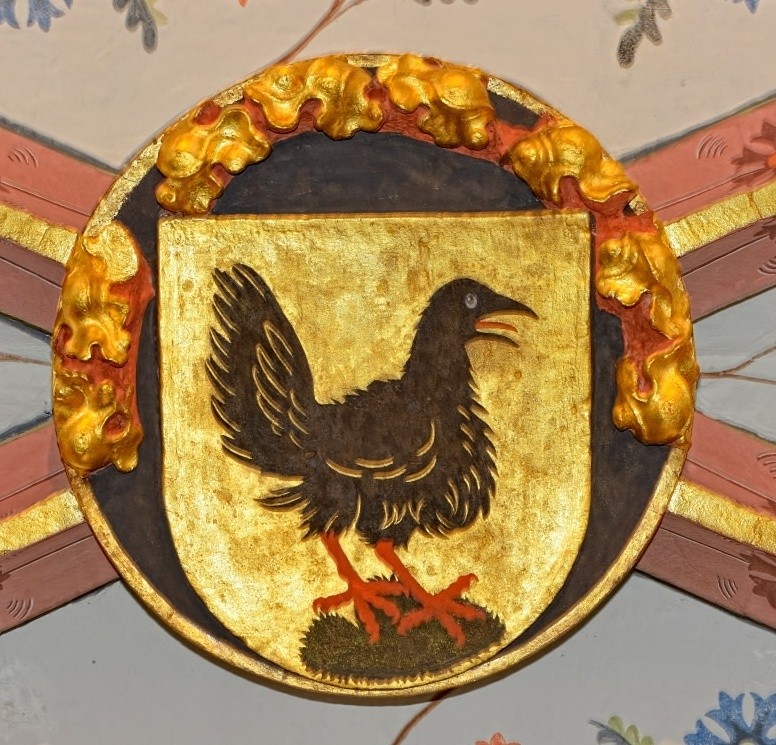
Coat of arms of Bishop Raban von Helmstatt of Speyer (around 1420), Collegiate Church of Neustadt an der Weinstraße

Raban von Helmstatt (c. 1362 – 4 November 1439) was a German nobleman who served as Bishop of Speyer from 1396 and as Archbishop and Elector of Trier from 1430 until his resignation from both positions in 1438. He was appointed Archbishop of Trier by Pope Martin V in May 1430. Raban died in Speyer on 4 November 1439 and was buried in Speyer Cathedral.
