= Rudolf van Diepholt =

- Bishop of Utrecht
- Church: Catholic Church
- Diocese: Archdiocese of Utrecht
- In office: 1423–1455

Personal details
- Born: c. 1390
- Died: 24 March 1455

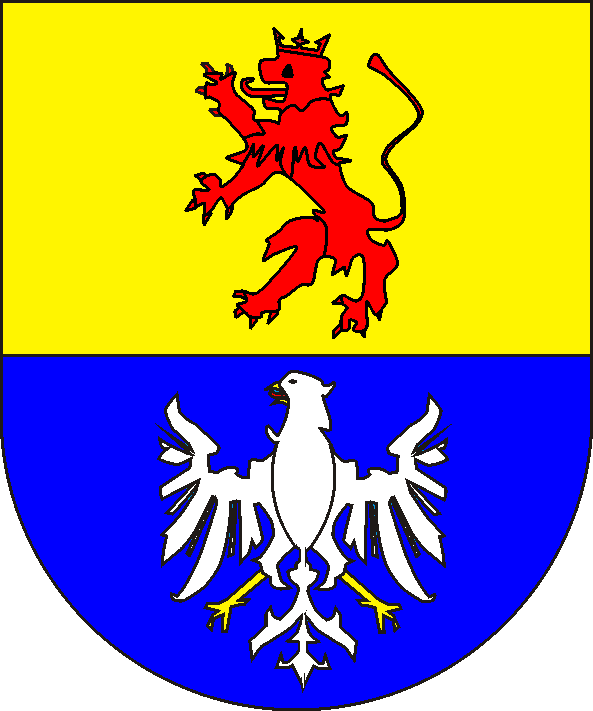
Diepholt coat of arms

Rudolf van Diepholt (c. 1390 – Vollenhove, 24 March 1455) or Rudolf of Diepholz was a bishop of Utrecht from 1423 to 1455 and bishop of Osnabrück from 1454 to 1455.

== Biography ==
Rudolf van Diepholt was one of the most influential Prince-Bishops of Utrecht in the late Middle Ages. Rudolf was the son of Johann III, Lord of Diepholz (died 1422), and Countess Kunigunde von Oldenburg; he was brother of Konrad IX, Lord of Diepholz (died 1426), and uncle of Otto IV, Lord of Diepholz (died 1481). Before his appointment as bishop, Rudolf van Diepholt was Canon in Cologne.

=== Utrecht Schism ===
After the death of Frederick of Blankenheim in 1423, Rudolf was elected bishop by the chapters thanks to support from the towns and nobles. Utrecht was divided by a factional struggle between the Lichtenbergers and Lokhorsten. Rudolf was a candidate of the Lichtenbergers, and the Lokhorsten refused to cease the support of their candidate Zweder van Culemborg. Pope Martin V attempted to resolve the conflict on 7 June 1424, by appointed his own favourite; Rhabanus van Helmstatt. Unfortunately Rhabanus did not want the appointment, and withdrew, at which the pope appointed Zweder on 6 February 1425 as bishop of Utrecht. This period is called the Utrecht Schism. Zweder used violence to gain control of the bishopric, but he was driven out of the city in 1426 by the Lichtenbergers. Rudolf was excommunicated by the pope, but he managed to maintain himself, even though Zweder was initially supported by the duke of Guelders and duke Philip the Good, also count of Holland.

Rudolf, however, was able to sign agreements with both neighbouring rulers. When Martin V's successor, pope Eugene IV, also recognised Rudolf as bishop on 10 December 1432, Rudolf was finally able to make his official entrance as bishop in 1433. Zweder van Culemborg died the same year, but his claim was picked up by Walraven van Meurs, who was supported by the Council of Basel. Walraven eventually retracted his claim in 1448, ending the Utrecht Schism. Rudolf was now universally recognised, but in the same year he was driven out of the city by his subjects, who were unhappy with his tax-policies. In 1449 Rudolf violently returned, and he held his position until his death in 1455.

=== Last years ===
When Hendrik van Meurs, bishop of Osnabruck died in 1450, Rudolf involved himself in a succession struggle, the Münster Diocesan Feud, that lasted for years. Rudolf attempted to put his nephew Conrad of Diepholz, provost at Osnabrück, on the ecclesiastical seat. But in 1454 Rudolf dealt a heavy blow to his opponents, after which he became bishop of Osnabrück himself. After his death his nephew succeeded him as bishop of Osnabrück.

Rudolf van Diepholt advanced the construction of the Dom Church, and he was interred in a chapel that carries his name.

Rudolf van Diepholt House of Diepholz Born: c. 1390 Died: 24 March 1455
Preceded by Frederick III of Blankenheim	Bishop of Utrecht; 1423-1455	Succeeded by Gijsbrecht van Brederode
Preceded by Albert of Hoya	Prince-Bishop of Osnabrück; 1454-1455	Succeeded by Conrad III of Diepholz
