= Imperial church system =

Governance policy in the early Holy Roman Empire

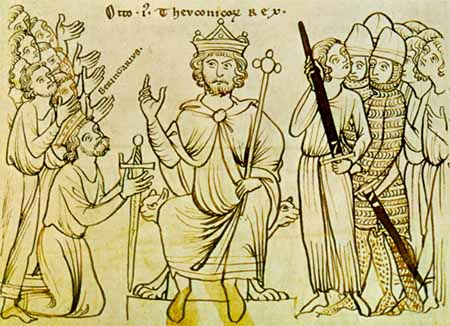
The Imperial Church System is most often associated with Otto I.

The imperial church system (German: Reichskirchensystem, Dutch: rijkskerkenstelsel) was a governance policy by the early Holy Roman emperors to entrust as often as possible the secular governance of the state to as many celibate members of the clergy (especially bishops and abbots) of the Catholic Church, instead of the non-celibate laity. Rulers did so because celibate clergymen could not produce legitimate heirs, who could have claimed their inheritance at death, which would have then let them establish regional dynasties, which could have threatened the power of the ruling family.

Upon the clerics' deaths, the areas that they had governed automatically reverted to the rulers, who could then appoint their own new confidants to the position and thus retain control of all parts of the realm. A bishop thus bestowed with temporal (secular) power of a prince, on top of his spiritual (religious) power as a bishop, was known as a prince-bishop, and his domain as a prince-bishopric (German: Fürstbistum, Stift or Hochstift; Dutch: prinsbisdom or sticht).

Although the phenomenon is most often associated with the Ottonian emperors and is therefore sometimes also called the Ottonian system since Otto I introduced the system in the Holy Roman Empire in the 10th century, the practice of appointing celibate Catholic clerics in worldly governing positions had already existed during the Merovingian and Carolingian Empire. In Ottonian times, the practice also occurred in France and England, albeit at a smaller scale.

The system worked as long as the emperors and kings could control the appointment of the bishops. The Ottonians even managed to control the bishops of Rome, who were in the process of achieving papal primacy inside Western Christendom. The popes, objecting to imperial control in the church, called on the bishops to oppose the emperor, managed to strengthen their position in the 11th and 12th century during the investiture controversy and seized indirect control of the appointment of bishops in the Holy Roman Empire with the 1122 Concordat of Worms. Initially, a system was introduced in which local cathedral chapters elected the new bishop, and their choice had to be confirmed by the metropolitan bishop.

In the 14th century, the Holy See began to reserve the appointment of certain bishops to itself after which the popes gradually laid claim to the exclusive right to appoint all bishops everywhere. That enabled them to appoint their confidants, which nullied the emperors' advantages and thus their interest in maintaining and enlarging the imperial church system. Although some prince-bishoprics continued to exist until the French Revolution and even the German mediatisation (1803), they gradually declined in number and power in subsequent centuries.

== See also ==
- Caesaropapism
- Church and state in medieval Europe
- Diocesan feud (military), conflict that arose when the election of a prince-bishop was disputed
- Papal appointment

== Literature ==
- Timothy Reuter, The Imperial Church System of the Ottonian and Salian Rulers. A Reconsideration. In: Journal of Ecclesiastical History, 33, 1982, p. 347–374.
- Josef Fleckenstein, Problematik und Gestalt der Reichskirche. In: Karl Schmid (ed.), Reich und Kirche vor dem Investiturstreit. Festschrift Gerd Tellenbach. Sigmaringen 1985, p. 83–98.
