= Zoudenbalch =

Prominent Dutch historical family

The Zoudenbalch family (also known as Soudenbalch) was one of the most prominent families of Utrecht throughout the Middle Ages to the age of the Dutch Revolt. They occupied all posts of importance in the city government, possessed various lordships in the vicinity and played a leading role in the history of the Sticht (Prince-Bishopric of Utrecht). The Zoudenbalchs were also Lords of the island of Urk in the Zuiderzee (now IJsselmeer) for over a century (1476–1614), and as such played a key role in the life of that community during troubled times in the 16th century.

== Introduction ==
The Zoudenbalch (or Soudenbalch) family dominated the medieval history of Utrecht by the longevity of their influence in the temporal and spiritual life of the city. The evidence of their past glory is still evident in modern Utrecht. The ancient ancestral castle of the Zoudenbalchs still dominates the Oudegracht running through the city centre and the facade of their gothic palace continues to stand proudly in the Donkerstraat. Although their chapels in St. Marie and the Dom have been destroyed (the latter as recently as 1847) and the St. Elisabeth Gasthuis and Chapel which they founded no longer exists, eloquent testimony to their faith and influence still remains in less tangible form. Ever since 1491, when Evert Zoudenbalch founded the first orphanage in the Netherlands, the Zoudenbalch coat of arms has continuously guarded over the orphanage complex on two locations in the city as a mute tribute to the fact that their charity has funded half a millennium of social work in Utrecht.

The Zoudenbalchs are first mentioned in the city government of Utrecht in the early 13th century and continued to hold important posts there until the sixteenth. This was in stark contrast to the other great families of Utrecht, such as the Fresingers, the Lockhorsts and the Lichtenbergers, whose apogee was of far shorter duration.

== Origins in medieval Utrecht ==
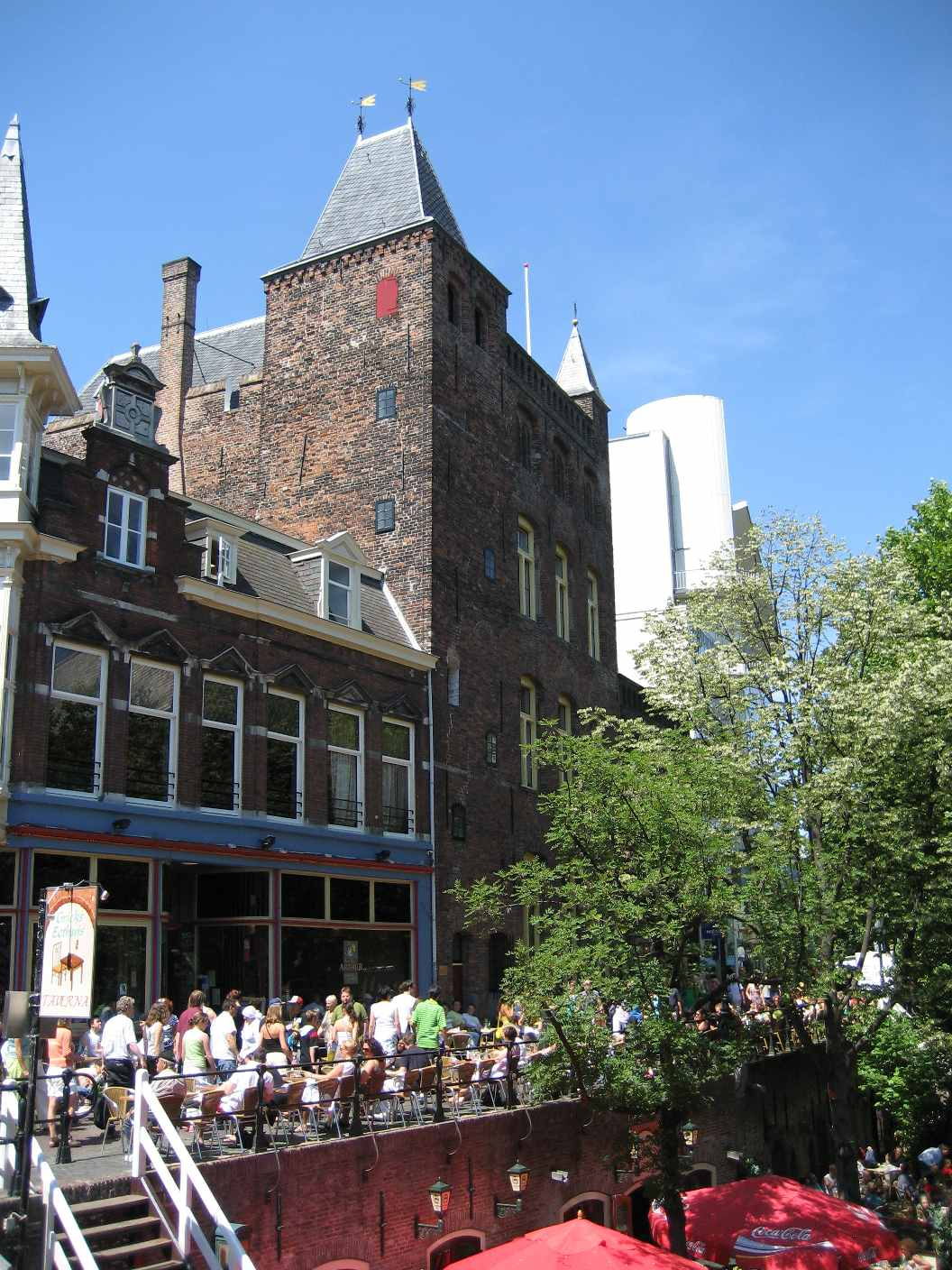
The fortified city castle of the Zoudenbalch family on the Oudegracht in Utrecht. The castle, currently known as Huis Oudaen after its later occupants, was built in the 13th century.

Utrecht was the principal metropolis of the northern Netherlands for the duration of the Middle Ages. The court of the Prince-Bishop, the wealth of Utrecht's many religious institutions and its location on the crossroads of various trade routes drew together the ancient blood nobility from the surrounding territories, aspiring ministerials in the service of the Prince-Bishop and all manner of free and unfree men seeking security and prosperity within the city walls. Many noble families engaged in commerce in Utrecht whilst serving in the plutocratic civic government of Utrecht together with prominent commoners; marriages between the nobility and wealthy burgher families regularly took place, blurring social distinctions intra muros.

The origins of the Zoudenbalchs within this socially dynamic environment has not been clearly defined. They clearly belonged to the honestiores cives, the urban elite, which exercised effective power within Utrecht. The family gathered its power and fortune during the course of the 12th century and rose to prominence from the beginning of the thirteenth. In all early genealogies of the family mention is made of marriages with damsels belonging to the Uten Goye Viscounts of Utrecht, the Lords of Langerak and the Van Damasche family – all of impeccable noble blood − yet the family's first appearances in recorded history suggests they were prominent citizens of Utrecht rather than members of the nobility.

Amongst the first Zoudenbalchs cited in Utrecht are:

- Petrus Soldenbalch, cited 1227, Alderman of Utrecht 1230–31.
- Jacobus Soldenbalch, cited in 1230 as burgher of Utrecht, subsequently as Councillor and in 1245 as Alderman of Utrecht.
- Jacobus die Soudenbalch, cited 1290.
- Frederick Soudenbalch, cited mentioned 28 August 1278 together with other noblemen of the Sticht who signed a treaty with the Count of Holland; he was Alderman of Utrecht (1278, '79, '83, '84, '87, '89, '90, '93 & '94). He is considered to be the progenitor of the prominent Zoudenbalchs of later date.

== The Zoudenbalchs in the Schism of Utrecht ==
During the course of the late 13th and 14th centuries members of the Zoudenbalch family held key offices in the civic government of Utrecht, serving as Sheriff (Schout), Mayors, Aldermen and Councillors. Younger sons and daughters procured important and lucrative offices and sinecures within the many powerful religious institutions situated in and around Utrecht.

Despite their prominence the family does not appear to have played a key role in the party feuds which erupted in Utrecht, as they did elsewhere in the Netherlands and France, during the course of the 14th century. This changed radically in the 15th century when the Zoudenbalchs took a leading role in the various partisan struggles which continually rocked the political and religious life of Utrecht.

In 1423 a struggle arose within the Sticht (Prince-Bishopric of Utrecht) between the pro-Burgundian and anti-Burgundian parties. Following their usurpation of the comtal rights to Holland the Burgundian dynasty aimed to place a client Prince-Bishop in the see of Utrecht, with the intent of consolidating their territorial grasp on their Netherlandish domains. The Burgundian candidate, Zweder van Culemborg, failed to secure the support of the greater part of the nobility and clergy of the Sticht despite the support of the Pope. The Chapters of the Sticht elected Rudolf van Diepholt (von Diepholz) as their Prince-Bishop, and civil war broke out. The Pope excommunicated all those who supported Rudolf, but the notables and population of the Sticht stood firmly by their candidate who ruled effectively as Prince-Bishop until peace was made and the Duke of Burgundy and the Pope also recognised Rudolf as such.

During this struggle, known as the Schism of Utrecht, Hubert Soudenbalch, (died 1450) firmly supported the pro-Burgundian party of Zweder van Culemborg. In May 1427 he participated in Zweder van Culemborg's failed coup in Utrecht and as a result was banished from Utrecht with his family. The Zoudenbalchs were obliged to remain in exile for almost 7 years and stayed (inter alia) in Leiden where they are mentioned in 1430. Following the reconciliation between Rudolf van Diepholt and the pro-Burgundian party the Zoudenbalchs were able to return to Utrecht, where they are cited again from February 1435.

== The Zoudenbalchs in the struggle between Brederode and Burgundy ==
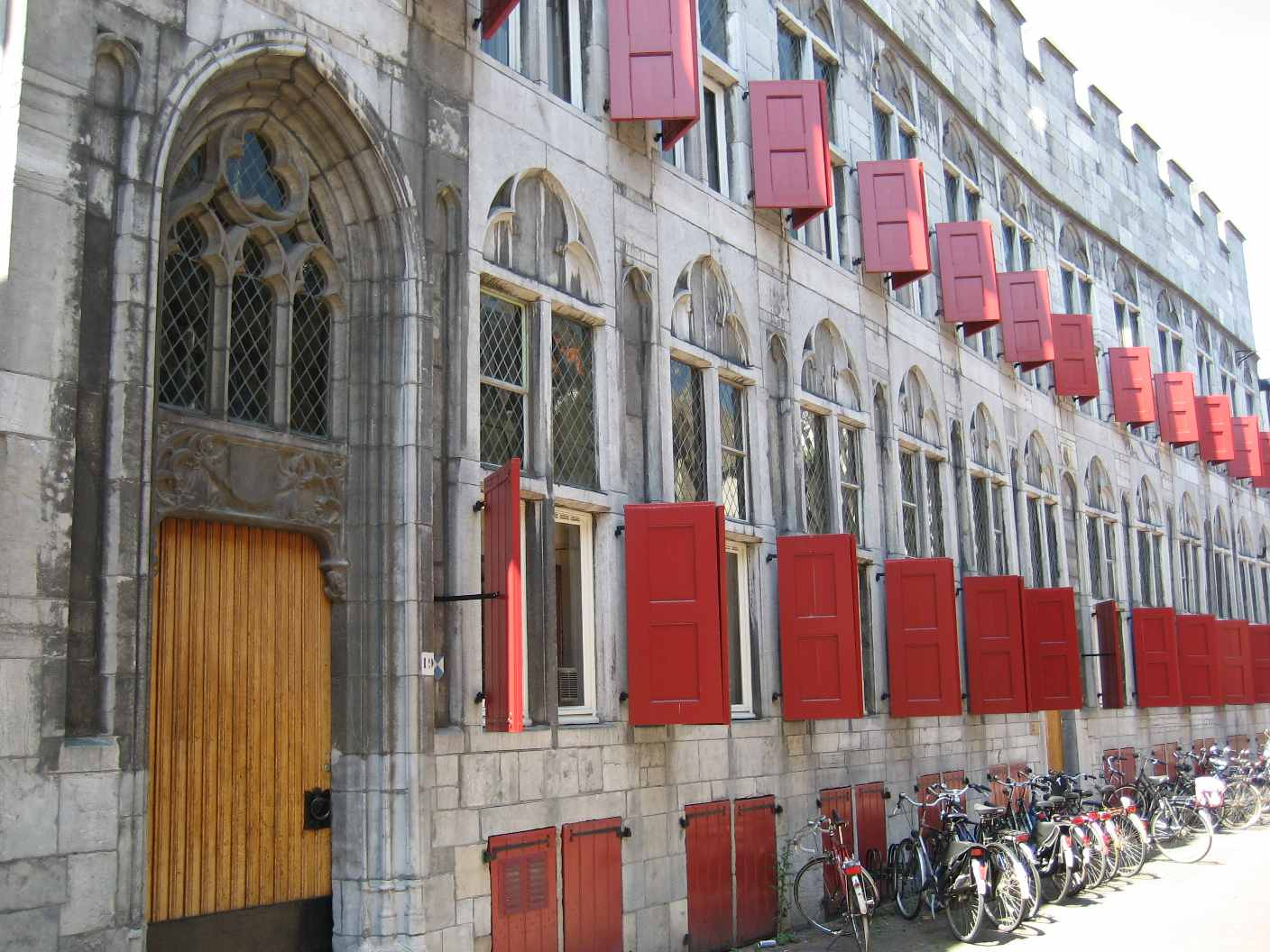
The gothic palace of the Zoudenbalch family in the Donkerstraat in Utrecht. The palace was built between 1467 and 1468 on the site of the former home of the family.

Following the death of Prince-Bishop Rudolf van Diepholt in 1455, the Burgundian dynasty once again set out to place a client bishop on the vacant see of Utrecht. Philip the Good, Duke of Burgundy, therefore put his bastard son, David of Burgundy, forward as candidate with the support of the papacy. As was their right however, the Chapters of Utrecht in their turn once again elected an own candidate, Gijsbrecht van Brederode, as Prince-Bishop. The simmering party feud between the anti-Burgundian and largely aristocratic "Lichtenbergers" and the pro-Burgundian "Lokhorsten" broke out again with renewed intensity and civil war loomed. Philip the Good was not prepared to tolerate any resistance to his expansionist dynastic policy and promptly invaded the Sticht, laying siege to Utrecht. Under threat of violence Bishop-Elect Gijsbrecht van Brederode was forced to renounce his rights to the see and David of Burgundy was enthroned in the Dom of Utrecht.

The Zoudenbalchs had been staunch supporters of Gijsbrecht van Brederode and continued to remain close to him after his deposition. Gijsbrecht was given various highly profitable and prestigious clerical titles and prebends to compensate for the loss of his bishopric, including the right to retain his prestigious office of Provost of the Dom of Utrecht. As Provost he appointed his friend and ally against Burgundy, the Dom Canon Evert Soudenbalch, to act as his Socius and Officius. Furthermore, in 1470 Evert also succeeded Gijsbrecht in his office of Provost of Sint Servaas in Maastricht.

Evert's brother, Gerrit Zoudenbalch, had married Geertruida van Zuylen van Natewisch, daughter of Johan van Zuylen van Natewish, Lord of Natewisch and Zuylenstein, (died 1497). This Johan was at one time Mayor of Utrecht and a key supporter of Gijsbrecht's bid for the bishopric. Johan was a principal figure amongst the nobles and clergy who swore fealty to Gijsbrecht at Rhenen on 9 April 1456 four months prior to the Burgundian coup. Although Johan later reconciled himself with the Burgundian party and at one time acted as Councillor to David of Burgundy (he was cited as such in 1459), this alliance between the Zoudenbalchs and the Zuylen van Natewisches pre-figured and certainly influenced Gerrit's key anti-Burgundian stance in the Utrecht Civil War over twenty years later.

David of Burgundy was thus finally accepted as Prince-Bishop by the Chapters and nobility of the Sticht under Burgundian force-majeure but the latter parties continued to jealously guard over the local privileges and usages of the Sticht. Over the following years David's authoritarian style of government and his attempts at centralisation (which constantly undermined the Sticht's legal particularities) led to ever-worsening conflicts with local church notables, the aristocracy and the patriciate. The aristocratic "Lichtenberger" party in the city of Utrecht, under the leadership of Gerrit Zoudenbalch, came to align itself more and more with the Hollandish "Hook" party which was intent on resisting the Burgundian drive to centralisation in the County of Holland. By the last quarter of the 15th century the two parties -commonly known as Hooks- were acting with one accord in resisting Burgundian hegemony with political guile and occasional violence in both territories.

== The Zoudenbalchs and the outbreak of the Utrecht Civil War ==
The unexpected death of Duke Charles the Bold in 1477, who was succeeded by his young and inexperienced daughter Maria, opened the floodgates of latent anti-Burgundian sentiments in the Netherlands. In the Sticht a vicious civil war broke out between the States and Bishop David regarding the Episcopal High Court which had replaced the various local courts, in contravention of the traditional rights of the States. David of Burgundy was no longer welcome in the city of Utrecht or in the other cities of the Sticht and he retired with his partisans to his favourite castle in Wijk bij Duurstede.

Simultaneous to this battle of wills in the Sticht, civil war broke out in Holland between the anti-Burgundian Hook and the pro-Burgundian Cod parties. Archduke Maximilian I of Habsburg, who had married the Burgundian heiress, Mary of Burgundy, shortly after her father's death, faced threats to the Burgundian heritage from all sides and was initially unable to intervene decisively in Holland. The Hook party in Holland was led by Reinier van Broeckhuysen, a nephew of the former Bishop-Elect Gijsbrecht van Brederode. In 1481 Reinier managed to shortly capture Leiden with an army of Hook exiles but was ultimately forced to abandon the city to the more powerful Habsburg forces. He and his army then sought refuge in the Sticht where they stood under the protection of the energetic and ferocious Viscount January of Montfoort, leader of the anti-Burgundian forces in the bishopric. The Viscount, with the support of the Zoudenbalchs and other anti-Burgundian notables, then effectively staged a coup in the city government of Utrecht, ejecting the pro-Burgundian regents from their offices and thus ensuring that the council was fully committed to the Hook cause. War between the Burgundian's Habsburg heirs and the Hooks of Holland and Utrecht became inevitable.

Gerrit Zoudenbalch (died 3 December 1483) had played an active role from 1459 in the civic life of Utrecht as Mayor, Alderman and Councillor. Like many noblemen in Utrecht he complemented his revenues by commerce, trading in wine with his cousin Floris van Pallaes. As the conflict with Prince-Bishop David of Burgundy worsened, he became an ever more outspoken leader of the anti-Burgundian faction. Prior to and during the Civil War he was Mayor of Utrecht and at the height of the Civil War he occupied the powerful and critical post of Sheriff of Utrecht. Gerrit's brother, the Dom Canon Evert Zoudenbalch, had become the most powerful clergyman in Utrecht following the death of his friend Gijsbrecht van Brederode, and he shared his brother's fierce Sticht patriotism. The two brothers stood side by side with Viscount January of Montfoort in the struggle for the Sticht's autonomy.

In late 1481 the forces of Archduke Maximilian, under the leadership of Frederik van Egmond, Lord of Egmond and IJsselstein, began to ravage the Sticht and the countryside around Utrecht in particular. In order to secure finances to fund Hook mercenaries to counter the Habsburg forces, Gerrit Zoudenbalch barricaded all monasteries, convents and religious institutions in Utrecht and refused to allow any clergy to leave until they had handed over their treasures. This heavy-handed action led to loud protests from the clergy and he was forced to back off.

The Hooks of Utrecht realized that they stood little chance against Maximilian's might and so decided to search for a compromise with the Archduke. In September 1481 Gerrit Zoudenbalch led a delegation of the Sticht to Antwerp to meet with Maximilian. He was accompanied by his brother, Evert Zoudenbalch, who came as ambassador of the First Estate of the Sticht. Gerrit Zoudenbalch presented a long list of grievances against Prince-Bishop David, which were later countered by David's plenipotentiary, Jacob van Amerongen. Maximilian chose to believe Van Amerongen and refused to accommodate the requests of the Sticht's delegation.

Despite some initial military successes under Viscount January of Montfoort (most notably at the Vaart) the Hooks of Utrecht were well aware of the weakness of their position and they thus sought an alliance with King Louis XI of France, the arch-enemy of Maximilian – but ultimately all to no avail. The Hooks also sought to draw John I, the ambitious Duke of Cleves into the conflict. The Duke supported the cause of the Utrecht Hooks cautiously but not outrightly, sending his younger son, Engelbert, to join the Hook forces as a figurehead generalissimo.

== The Zoudenbalchs and the end of the Utrecht Civil War ==
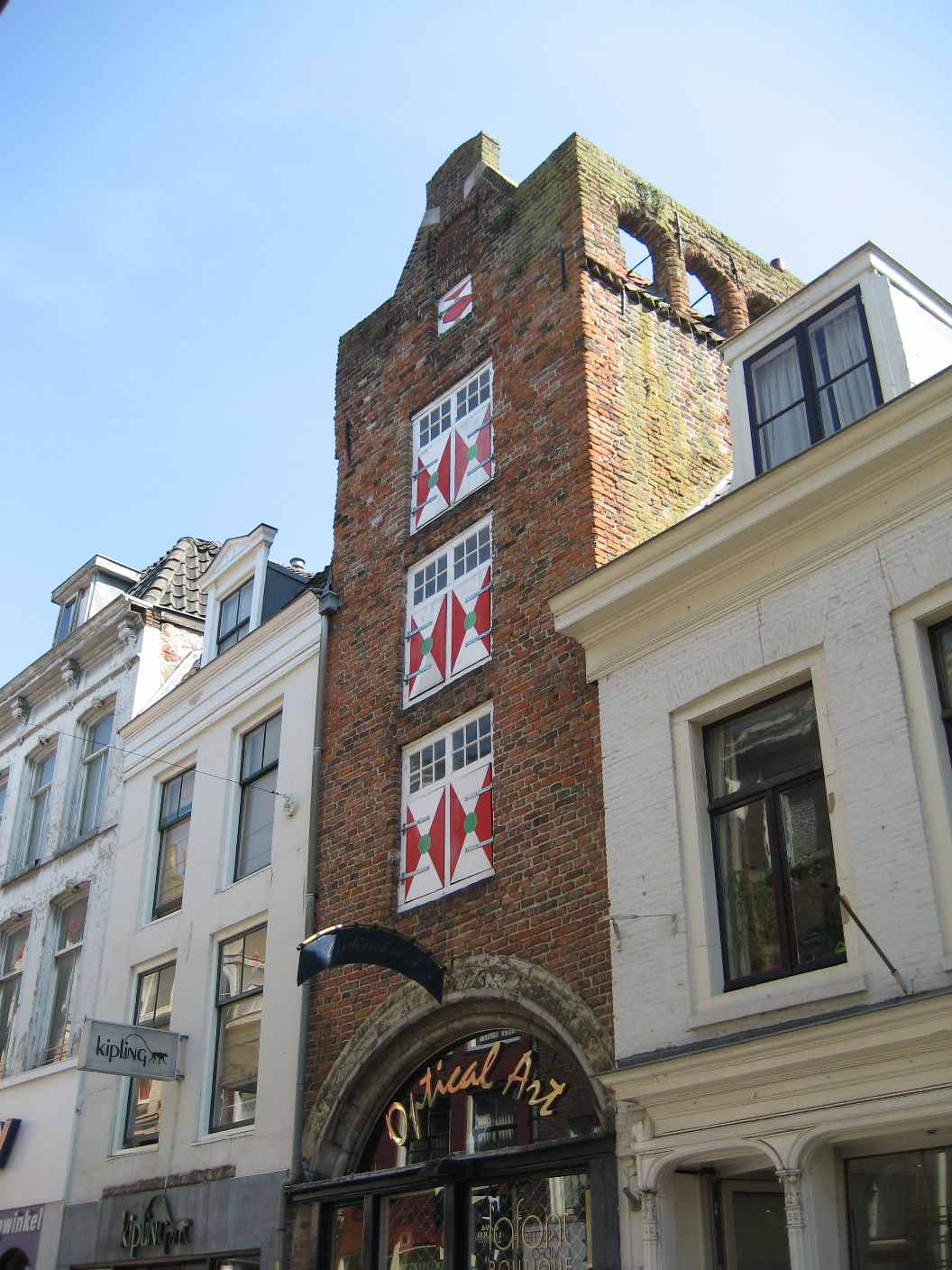
The gatehouse of the Zoudenbalch palace on the Mariastraat in Utrecht. The gatehouse opened onto a small semi-seigneurial domain within the city, with garden, orchards and a summer house.

The fortunes of war favoured the belligerent parties in turn without either side gaining the upper hand, but it was clear that the military might of the Burgundian-Habsburg forces would ultimately prevail. Early in 1482 the Hook party therefore again sent a delegation to negotiate with Maximilian's plenipotentiaries at Schoonhoven, which once again included Gerrit Zoudenbalch. The negotiations at Schoonhoven failed but both parties continued their attempts to reach a peaceful settlement with further negotiations in Woerden, the Hague and Arnhem.

Pope Sixtus IV then intervened in the conflict and placed the population of the Sticht under an interdict, forbidding any church services to be held until they would allow their Prince-Bishop to freely enter Utrecht. This further raised tensions within the Sticht between the peace party who were tired of the war and the endless depredations, suffering and famine it was causing, and the ultra-Hook party which remained committed to protect the privileges of the Sticht at any price. The bellicose diplomacy of Gerrit Zoudenbalch managed to prevent a compromise being reached during negotiations at Werkhoven in the autumn of 1482 but the tide of popular opinion was turning against the ultra-Hooks. The Treaty of Arras (1482) between Louis XI and Maximilian ruled out the possibility of any foreign support for the Hook party and further sapped morale in the beleaguered Sticht.

On 21 April 1483 the peace party in Utrecht led a coup against the Hooks and imprisoned Viscount January of Montfoort, Evert Soudenbalch (see below) and other Hook notables who had gathered to define their negotiating strategy with Maximilian. With the peace party in power, the Prince-Bishop could safely re-enter Utrecht; he speedily returned in triumph to settle in his old episcopal palace in the city together with his partisans. But the Hooks quickly struck back and on 8 May 1483 they re-occupied the city in a daring and stealthy night raid, capturing the Prince-Bishop, whom they then imprisoned in Amersfoort.

The Archduke Maximilian immediately set camp before the walls of Utrecht and laid siege to the city. His troops' bombardment of the city walls seriously undermined the city's defences and the Hooks quickly requested a truce. Viscount January of Montfoort, the generalissimo Engelbert of Cleves and Gerrit Zoudenbalch then left the city to negotiate terms with the Archduke. The Viscount was not prepared to accept Maximilian's terms without further consultations with his allies so Engelbert of Cleves and Gerrit Zoudenbalch remained behind as hostages whilst Viscount January returned to the city. Shortly thereafter the inconsidered action of a party of Maximilian's troops broke the truce and in reaction January of Montfoort's Hook militants re-commenced hostilities with their besiegers. As a result, both Engelbert of Cleves and Gerrit Zoudenbalch were now considered to be prisoners of war.

The resumption of hostilities led to a hand-to-hand struggle for Utrecht which became uglier by the day with both sides suffering severe losses. With the chief Hook personalities dispersed, discouraged or in captivity, the peace party in Utrecht once again gained the upper hand over the viscerally anti-Burgundian Viscount January Maximilian, who had seen his stadtholder, Joost de Lalaing, and many of his men fall as casualties in the course of the siege, was now also inclined to peace. His conditions for capitulation were hard but not harsh and were readily accepted by the war-torn city. Having taken control of Utrecht the Archduke continued on to Amersfoort, where he liberated David of Burgundy. For financial, political and economic reasons it was in the interest of both Maximilian and David of Burgundy to effect a lasting reconciliation with their adversaries, and their moderate post-war policies reflected this need. Gerrit Zoudenbalch however remained under lock and key; he was imprisoned in the Castle of Schoonhoven and died in captivity towards the end of 1483. His brother, Evert Soudenbalch, wisely chose to effectuate a reconciliation with the Prince-Bishop, and continued to be one of the most prominent clergymen in Utrecht until his death twenty years later.

== Evert Zoudenbalch (1423/24-1503) ==
Evert Zoudenbalch played a prominent role in the Utrecht Civil War, but his lasting fame is due to an act of charity which continues to resound to this day. Evert was born some years after his brother Gerrit, and as the younger one of his family was destined for the church. He studied divinity at the University of Louvain from 1441 to 1445, and upon his return to Utrecht immediately secured offices and sinecures thanks to the influence of his family. He was appointed a canon of the Dom of Utrecht on 23 October 1445 and became choir-bishop (koorbisschop) some time before 10 January 1446, well before being ordained as a deacon and priest on 3 April 1451. He was appointed procurator (fabrieksmeester) of the Dom and as such was responsible for the last stages of the construction and renovation of the great Dom of Utrecht. He certainly made use of his influence in this office to procure architects and artisans for his own family and charitable projects.

Evert's office as provost and archdeacon of Westfriesland (from 1469 to 1483) was clearly a sinecure, but the post of quaestier of St. Cornelius which he acquired from 1481 required him to lead "questes" with the relics of St. Cornelius through the bishopric to raise funds for the construction of the Dom. He also had the privilege of carrying the head of St. Adrian in processions of the Chapter of the Dom.

Having retained his office of provost of the Dom after losing his episcopal title in 1466, Gijsbrecht van Brederode appointed Evert as his Socius and Officius as a reward for his support in the struggle with David of Burgundy. Before Gijsbrecht's death, Evert also succeeded him as provost of Sint Servaas at Maastricht (1470). In 1480 Evert was appointed vice-deacon of the Dom (vice-domdeken), and in 1482 he became treasurer of the Dom; he surprisingly retained this key post until 1500 despite his active opposition to the Prince-Bishop David of Burgundy in the Civil War of 1481–1483.

As a pre-eminent clergyman from a notable family, it was self-evident that Evert should function as a member (and occasionally chairman) of the First Estate (clergy) of Utrecht. He used his political weight to support the Bishop-Elect Gijsbrecht of Brederode in his struggle against the Burgundian candidate for the see of Utrecht and was later a staunch supporter of his brother's anti-Burgundian policies. He accompanied his brother on his embassy to the Archduke Maximilian in September 1481 as the representative of the First Estate of the Sticht and was amongst the most prominent of the Hook leaders who were captured during the coup d'état of 21 April 1483. His devotion to the defence of the Sticht's old privileges was so intense that he personally subsidised the recovery of Utrecht's lost war-materials from IJsselstein in 1482. He nevertheless reconciled himself with Bishop David of Burgundy following the siege and surrender of Utrecht in late 1483. Bishop David formally forgave him all that he had done against him in April 1484, and Evert remained one of the most prominent clergyman in Utrecht until his death twenty years later.

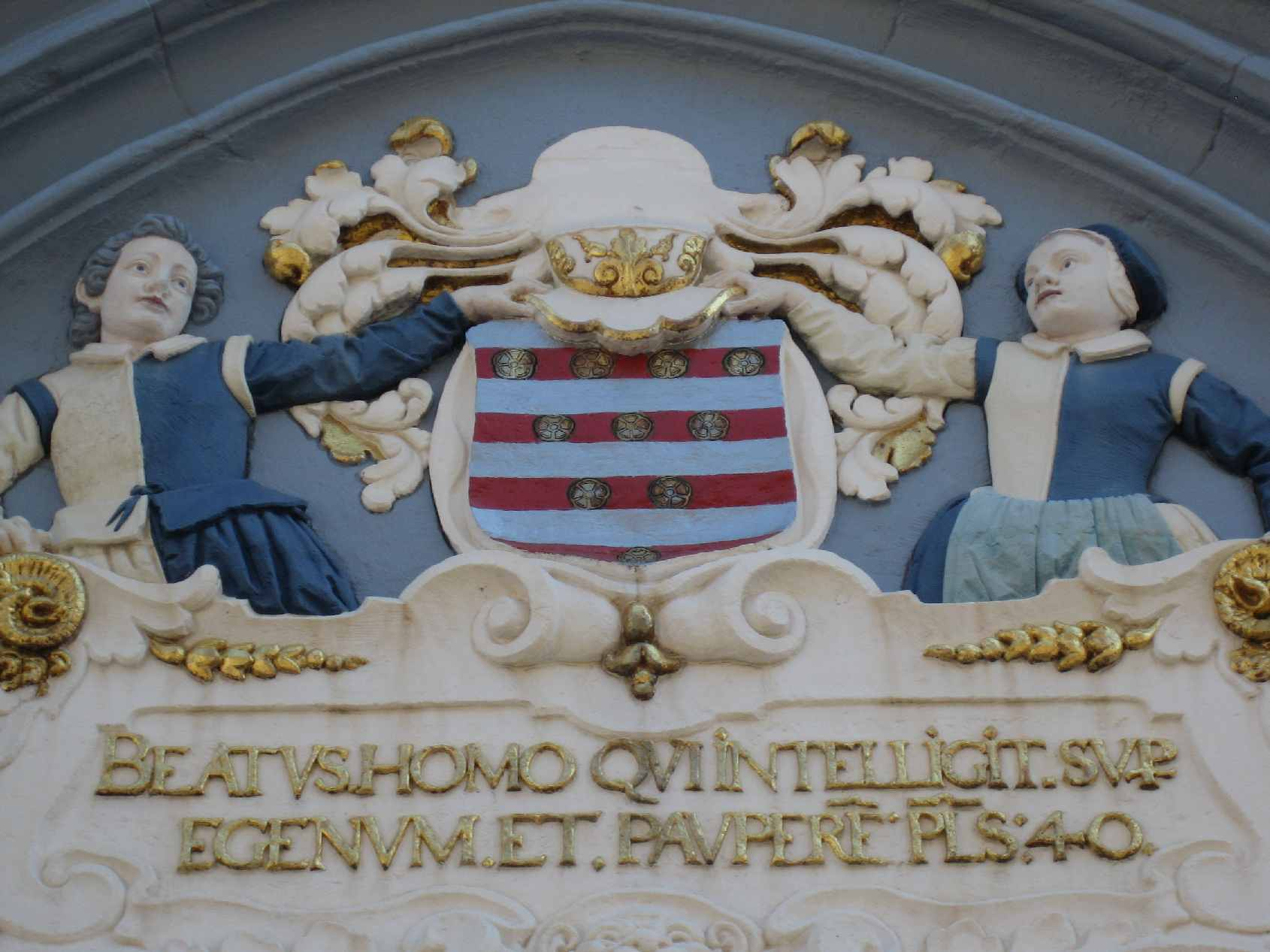
The coat of arms of the Zoudenbalch family on a portal in the Springstraat in Utrecht. The portal guards over one of the sites of the orphanage founded by Evert Zoudenbalch in 1497.

Between 1467 and 1468 Evert built a gothic palace for the family, known as Huis Soudenbalch, in the Donkerstraat in Utrecht on the site of the family's former home. He bought up most surrounding land on the block (nine houses in the Donkerstraat, as well as houses in the Mariastraat, Steenweg and Zadelstraat) and created a seigneurial domain within the city with its own courtyard, gardens and summer house. There is little doubt that Evert used his influence as Procurator of the Dom to engage talented architects and artisans from the cathedral in order to build his own gothic gem. He had already bought and broken down a house in the Donkerstraat in 1459 to create an alleyway to connect his home to his parish church, the Buurkerk - this alley was later known as Soudenbalchstraat. His family's fortune and his own income from church offices made Evert a profoundly wealthy man. He owned 350 morgen land outside Utrecht. In 1475 his relative Alijt van Kuinre bequeathed him the High and Low Lordships of Urk and Emmeloord (see below).

Evert Zoudenbalch's most enduring legacy and greatest fame is due to an act of charity, for in the late 15th century he decided to establish the first orphanage in the northern Netherlands and left it an immense capital to finance its acts of charity. The chapel of the orphanage, the Sint Elisabethgasthuis in Utrecht, was consecrated on the Eve of St. Poncian's day (13 January) in 1491. The orphanage was an exceptional piece of gothic architecture and was dedicated to the paragon of noble charity, St. Elisabeth of Hungary, Landgravine of Thuringia. Following Evert's death on the night of 28–29 March 1503, he was buried in the chapel devoted to St. Elisabeth. The gothic complex was however damaged beyond repair during the siege of Vredenburg (1567/1568) in the course of the Dutch Revolt and the buildings were demolished. The orphanage was then re-located to another location between the Springstraat and the Oudegracht in 1582. Evert's foundation for orphans continued to function after the Reformation under the benevolent charge of Utrecht's regents. To this day, after half a millennium, his capital continues to subsidize acts of charity through the Evert Zoudenbalch Foundation / Stichting in Utrecht.

Besides the Sint Elisabethgasthuis Evert Zoudenbalch also established altars and vicariates in various Utrecht churches. Some time around 1460 he commissioned a richly illuminated two-volume bible, which is a masterpiece of late Netherlandish illumination. The key contributing artist to the manuscript is known as "The Master of Evert Zoudenbalch". This Zoudenbalch Bible, which includes a portrait of Evert, is currently housed in the Austrian Library in Vienna (Österreichische Nationalbibliothek, cod. 2771, fol. 10 r°.). Further portraits of Evert Zoudenbalch are housed in the Centraal Museum in Utrecht and the Bonnefantenmuseum in Maastricht, while another continues to guard over the Regents’ Chamber of the Evert Zoudenbalch Foundation in Utrecht.

== The Zoudenbalchs as Lords of Urk ==
The Zoudenbalchs came into possession of the lordship of Urk through their opposition to the Burgundian dynasty's disregard for ancient property rights. Urk was a strategic island in the Zuiderzee (now the IJsselmeer) which could effectively block access to the trading IJssel cities and Amsterdam. The island had been in the possession of the Kuinre dynasty for many generations but Charles the Bold, Duke of Burgundy, decided to grant the island to one of his favourites, Gerard Entz, the mayor of Enkhuizen, without any regard to the rights of the Van Kuinres. The legitimate Lady of Urk, Alijt van Kuinre, refused to accept this travesty of justice but after the death of her husband Evert Freijs van Stroewijck in 1575 did not have the means to combat the Duke. On 17 December 1475 after a period of long negotiations she bequeathed the island of Urk to her distant but powerful relative, Evert Zoudenbalch (see above), who then successfully re-claimed his seigneurial rights to High and Low Lordships of Urk.

Evert remained Lord of Urk until 1495 when he passed on his rights to his nephew, who was also called Evert. Upon this Evert's death the Lordship of Urk passed to Johan Zoudenbalch (died 1558) and from him to his son Gerrit (died 1599), the last male Zoudenbalch of the senior branch of the family. Gerrit's wife, Barbara van Essenstein, was Lady of Urk until her death in 1614 when the island was sold to Jonker van de Werve. The Lordship of Urk thus remained in the possession of the Zoudenbalch family from 1475 until 1614 and the Zoudenbalchs witnessed many tribulations on Urk during the period of their rule there. In the early 16th century the island was plagued by pirate raids led by guerilla leaders from the Duchy of Gueldres, Karel van Gelder and Grote Pier. Then, in 1536, Urk was hit by the Black Plague and its population decimated. In 1570 the All Saints flood (Allerheiligenvloed) destroyed much of the infrastructure of the island and claimed many lives.

== The demise of the Zoudenbalchs: the Reformation and the Dutch Revolt ==
Having been politically engaged troublemakers par excellence in the course of the 15th century, the Zoudenbalchs retired from prominent roles in public life during the course of the sixteenth. While the family led a charmed life in their countryside castles in the Sticht (Prattenburg, Ter Meer, Zuylenstein), the social and political structure of the Netherlands was busy changing beyond recognition; first as a result of Habsburg centralisation, then as a result of the Reformation and the Dutch Revolt. The Zoudenbalchs however continued to remain strictly loyal to the Roman creed as Protestantism gained ground in the northern Netherlands. Little mention is made of their engagement in the internecine struggles of the Dutch Revolt but the Zoudenbalch's marriage politics clearly indicate that their loyalties lay with the Spanish Habsburgs rather than with their rebellious compatriots.

Protestant political primacy led to prohibitions being placed on public Catholic worship in the United Provinces. The Zoudenbalchs, as one of the principal remaining Catholic families of Utrecht, therefore discreetly allowed their gothic palace in the Donkerstraat to be used to celebrate masses. The passionately Catholic Walravina Zoudenbalch, who became the mistress of the palace after the death of her brothers in 1599, felt this to be a holy duty. When these secret masses became public in 1605, Protestants incensed at the sacrilege crowds rioted outside the palace. The city government of Utrecht therefore deemed it wise to forbid the Zoudenbalchs to continue these masses.

As practicing Catholics loyal to the Spanish king, the family was excluded from public office in the northern Netherlands once Habsburg rule had been overthrown. Although they retained their wealth they access to power and influence. Within two to three generations the energy of this once great family was spent and they were all but extinct.

The pious Walravina Zoudenbalch and her sisters Josina and Rutgera, became heirs to the senior branch of the Zoudenbalchs after the early deaths of their two brothers without progeny. These co-heiresses passed on the claims to the Zoudenbalch heritage and arms to their own children: the Ruysch van Pijlsweerd, the Van der Marsche and Kockman and the Van Holt(h)families. The remaining cadet branches of the Zoudenbalchs died out in the male line during the course of the 17th century.

== Prominent Zoudenbalchs in the temporal life of Utrecht ==
- Frederick Zoudenbalch (alias Zoude van Damasche): Alderman of Utrecht (1308–26), owned the city castle then known as Huis Soudenbalch, now known as Oudaen (1311).
- Adam Soudenbalch: Alderman of Utrecht (1332, 39, 43, 45, 46) Sheriff (Schout) of Utrecht (1348), owned the city castle then known as Huis Soudenbalch, now known as Huis Oudaen.
- Gerrit Soudenbalch van Damasche (born Utrecht ca. 1285, died 1344/47): Alderman of Utrecht (1311–39).
- Tydeman Soudenbalch (alias van Damasche and van der Masch) (died in or before 1380): cited from 1348 onwards, Alderman of Utrecht (1350–78) and Mayor of Utrecht (1364–76).
- Hubert Zoudenbalch (died 1450): prominent pro-Burgundian partisan in the Schism of Utrecht.
- Gerrit Zoudenbalch (born ca. 1415, died in captivity Castle Schoonhoven 3 December 1483): leader of the anti-Burgundian Hook party in the city of Utrecht, Mayor of Utrecht (1479, 83), Ouderman of Utrecht (1461, 63), Alderman of Utrecht (1459, 79, 81, 83), Councillor of Utrecht (1466, 77), Sheriff of Utrecht (1483), Cameraar of the Lekdijk (1477, 78).
- Evert Zoudenbalch, Lord of Zuylenstein (died 1 December 1530): Mayor of Utrecht (1493, 97, 1501, 05, 09, 14, 18, 22), Councillor of Utrecht (1499, 1503, 07), Alderman of Utrecht (1490, 91, 92, 93, 95, 97, 1501, 05, 09, 14, 18, 22, 24), Dike-Reeve of the Lekdijk.
- Jan Zoudenbalch, Lord of Urk, Emmeloord and Weert bij Utrecht, knight (1503 – 12 December 1558)
- Evert Zoudenbalch, Lord of Prattenburch, knight (died 1550): Dike-Reeve of the Lekdijk
- Gerard Soudenbalch, Lord of Urk & Emmeloord (died June 1599): Dike-Reeve of the Lekdijk (bovensdams)

== Prominent Zoudenbalchs in the religious life of Utrecht ==
- Hugo Soudenbalch (died 1280):, Canon of St. Marie at Utrecht.
- Gerrit Soudenbalch (died 1312): Provost of the chapter of St. Marie in Utrecht, Deacon and Canon of the Dom and Canon of Sint Peter; founder of the Soudenbalch Chapel in Sint Marie.
- Margareta de Zoudenbalch (died 1343): Abbess of St. Servaes at Utrecht.
- Hendrik Soudenbalch: Canon of St. Marie in Utrecht, cited 1399−1424.
- Tydeman Soudenbalch Gerritsz: cited from 1409, Vicar of St. Marie in Utrecht (1418).
- Stephana / Steven van Zoudenbalch (died 1484): Abbess of Mariëndal (outside Utrecht).
- Beatrix Zoudenbalch (died 1491): Prioress of the Norbertine Convent of Wittevrouwen (in Utrecht) which was primarily for ladies of noble descent; she was buried in the Convent of Wittevrouwen.
- Gerard Zoudenbalch (died 9 November 1524): Canon of the Dom, Treasurer of the Dom.
- Henrick Zoudenbalch (died 18 April 1536): Canon of St. Servaes at Maastricht, of Sint Pieter at Utrecht and of the Dom of Utrecht (1508).
- Evert Zoudenbalch, Lord of Urk and Emmeloord (born August 1423−1424, died night of 28–29 March 1503): Canon of the Dom of Utrecht (from 23 October 1445), Choir-Bishop (koorbisschop) (from before 10 January 1446), Deacon & Priest (3 April 1451), Procurator (fabrieksmeester) of the Dom, Socius & Officius of the Provost of the Dom, Treasurer of the Dom (1482–1500), Vice-Deacon of the Dom (vice-domdeken) (from 1480), Provost & Arch-deacon of Westfriesland (1469–83), Quaestier of St. Cornelius (from 1481), Member (and occasionally chairman) of the First Estate of Utrecht, Provost of St. Servaes at Maastricht (from 1470), founder of the Sint Elisabethgasthuis (first orphanage in the northern Netherlands).
- Gerrit Zoudenbalch "de Jonge" (died in or before 1522), Canon in Utrecht
- Walravina Soudenbalch: she lived in her family palace in the Donkerstraat after her brother's death and was a fervent Roman Catholic who opened her home to her co-religionists to celebrate mass in secret. After riots directed against these masses in 1605 they were forbidden by the city government. Walravina married Johan Ruysch van Pijlsweerd, by whom she had children. She and her sisters Josina and Rutgera were the co-heiresses to the senior branch of the Zoudenbalch family.

== The architectural heritage of the Zoudenbalch family in Utrecht and environs ==
Stadskasteel / Huis Oudaen, formerly Huis Soudenbalch, a fortified city castle on the Oude Gracht probably built by Tydeman Zoudenbach (cited 1291). The city castle remained in the possession of the Zoudenbalchs until the second half of the 14th century but long continued to be known as Huis Soudenbalch; the first mention of the castle as Huis Oudaen was made in 1523.

Stadskasteel / Huis Soudenbalch, in the Donkerstraat. Gothic palace built by Dom Canon Evert Zoudenbalch, Lord of Urk and Emmeloord, in 1467−68 on a site which had long been linked to the Soudenbalchs. The beautiful gothic facade was probably designed by the Dommeester, who fell under Evert in his capacity as Procurator (fabrieksmeester) of the Dom. The mansion was a seigneurial domain within the city with a courtyard and a summer house. The family lived in the palace for a number of generations, and between 1600 and 1605 it even functioned as a secret Roman Catholic church under Zoudenbalch patronage. Behind the palace was a large garden which extended to the Mariastraat. The alleyway connecting the palace to the Buurkerk - originally the Soudenbalchstraat- was created by Evert ca. 1459.

Medieval gatehouse of Huis Soudenbalch in the Mariastraat still stands and currently serves as a shop. The gatehouse gave access to the garden and courtyard of the palace.

Soudenbalch Chapel in the Church of Sint Marie: the chapel was founded by Gerrit Soudenbalch (died 1312) who was Provost of the chapter of St. Marie in Utrecht, Deacon and Canon of the Dom and Canon of Sint Peter. Most members of the Zoudenbalch family were buried in this chapel. The chapel was destroyed when the Church of Sint Marie was demolished in the 19th century. Various images of the chapel have survived in the work of the well-known Dutch painter, Pieter Saenredam, who painted and sketched the interior of Sint Marie on numerous occasions.

Soudenbalch Chapel in the Dom (Cathedral) of Utrecht, which housed the tombs of Hendrik and Gerard Soudenbalch was demolished in 1847. It had been one of the three chapels on the southern ship of the Cathedral which had survived the tornado of 1674.

Sint Elisabethgasthuis (I) on the Vredenburg. The first orphanage in the northern Netherlands was founded by Evert Soudenbalch in 1491. The Sint Elisabethgasthuis consisted of three wings around a central courtyard, with a gothic chapel on the fourth side, measuring 38×50 m altogether. The most interesting architectural aspect of the complex was the double spiral stair tower, an extremely rare feature of which this was one of the earliest examples. It reflects the double spiral stair towers in the west wing of the Dom which were built at the same time under Evert's procuratorship. As with his palace in the Donkerstraat Evert probably used his contacts as Procurator (fabrieksmeester) of the Dom to engage the most talented architects and artisans of his day to construct his foundation. The complex was damaged beyond repair in the siege of Vredenburg in 1567/68 and was subsequently demolished. The orphanage itself re-located to another site (see below).

Sint Elisabethgasthuis (II) was moved to a site between the Springstraat and the Oudegracht in 1582 following the destruction of the original gothic orphanage. It retained objects from the original foundation of Evert Soudenbalch, including the monumental portal on the Springweg portraying the Zoudenbalch arms supported by two orphans. In 1926 the orphanage moved again to a site on the Nieuwegracht, where the Evert Zoudenbalch Foundation is presently housed.

The Dom Church or Cathedral of Saint Martin, Utrecht was built over a number of centuries. Nonetheless, Dom-Canon Evert Soudenbalch made a considerable contribution to the later period of construction in his long tenure as Procurator (fabrieksmeester) of the Dom, in which he helped supervise these building activities. He did not hesitate to use the talents of architects and masons working on the Dom to help create his palace in the Donkerstraat and the Sint Elisabethgasthuis which he founded.

Prattenburg Castle was built in the late 15th century by Evert Soudenbalch on a farm which he bought in 1474, situated on the Cuneraweg between Rhenen and Veenendaal. The castle stayed in the Zoudenbalch family for a century and then passed by inheritance to the Van Fladeracken and Van der Marsche families. It was demolished sometime during the following centuries but was rebuilt as a small manor house in 1887.

Zoudenbalch Sports Complex on the outskirts of Utrecht is named after the Zoudenbalchs but the grounds themselves are not historically associated with the family. Appropriately for such a fiercely patriotic dynasty of the Sticht, these sport facilities are the training grounds for local football heroes FC Utrecht as well as various youth football teams from Utrecht.

== Literature ==
- Cornelis Booth, "Genealogische aantekeningen Soudenbalch", pp. 471–4, 942, 1129, collection in Het Utrechts Archief.
- P. Borst, etc., "Graven en begraven in de Dom van Utrecht", Bunnik 1997.
- Renger de Bruin, etc., "The city of Utrecht through twenty centuries. A brief history.", Utrecht 1999.
- R.E. de Bruin, etc., "Een paradijs vol weelde, De Geschiedenis van de stad Utrecht", Utrecht 2000.
- Evert van Ginkel, "Oudaen. Een weerbaar huis aan de Utrechtse Oudegracht", Utrecht 1999.
- Liesbeth M. Helmus (editor), "Pieter Saenredam, het Utrechtse werk", Utrecht 2000.
- Dr. A. van Hulzen,"Utrecht, De Geschiedenis en de Oude Bouwwerken", Amsterdam 1944.
- Dr. A. van Hulzen, "Wandelingen door Oud-Utrecht", Utrecht 2003.
- J.H. Marrow, etc., "The golden age of Dutch manuscript painting", Stuttgart & New York 1990.
- J.A.L. de Meyere, "Portretten van Evert Zoudenbalch" in Jaarboek Oud Utrecht, 1977, pp 56–70.
- "De Navorscher", 1883, p. 289 ("Soudenbalch")
- "De Navorscher", 1887, p. 202 ("Soudenbalch")
- B. Olde Meierink, etc., "Kastelen en ridderhofsteden in Utrecht", Utrecht 1995.
- A. Pietersma & L.L.M. Smit (editors), "Burgerwezen van Utrecht, 500 jaar stichting van Evert Zoudenbalch", Utrecht 1991.
- Dr. J.E.A.L. Struick, "Wandelgids van Utrecht", Utrecht & Antwerpen 1977.
- E.T. Suir, "Evert Zoudenbalch, domkannunik te Utrecht in de tweede helft van de 15e eeuw" in Jaarboek Oud Utrecht, 1977, pp 7–55.
- Susanne Weide, "Langs Utrechtse Geveltekens", Utrecht 2004.
- Dr. S.B.J. Zilverberg, "De Stichtse Burgeroorlog", Zutphen 1978.
