= Utrecht war of 1481–83 =

War over influence in Utrecht, Holland

- Part of the Hook and Cod wars
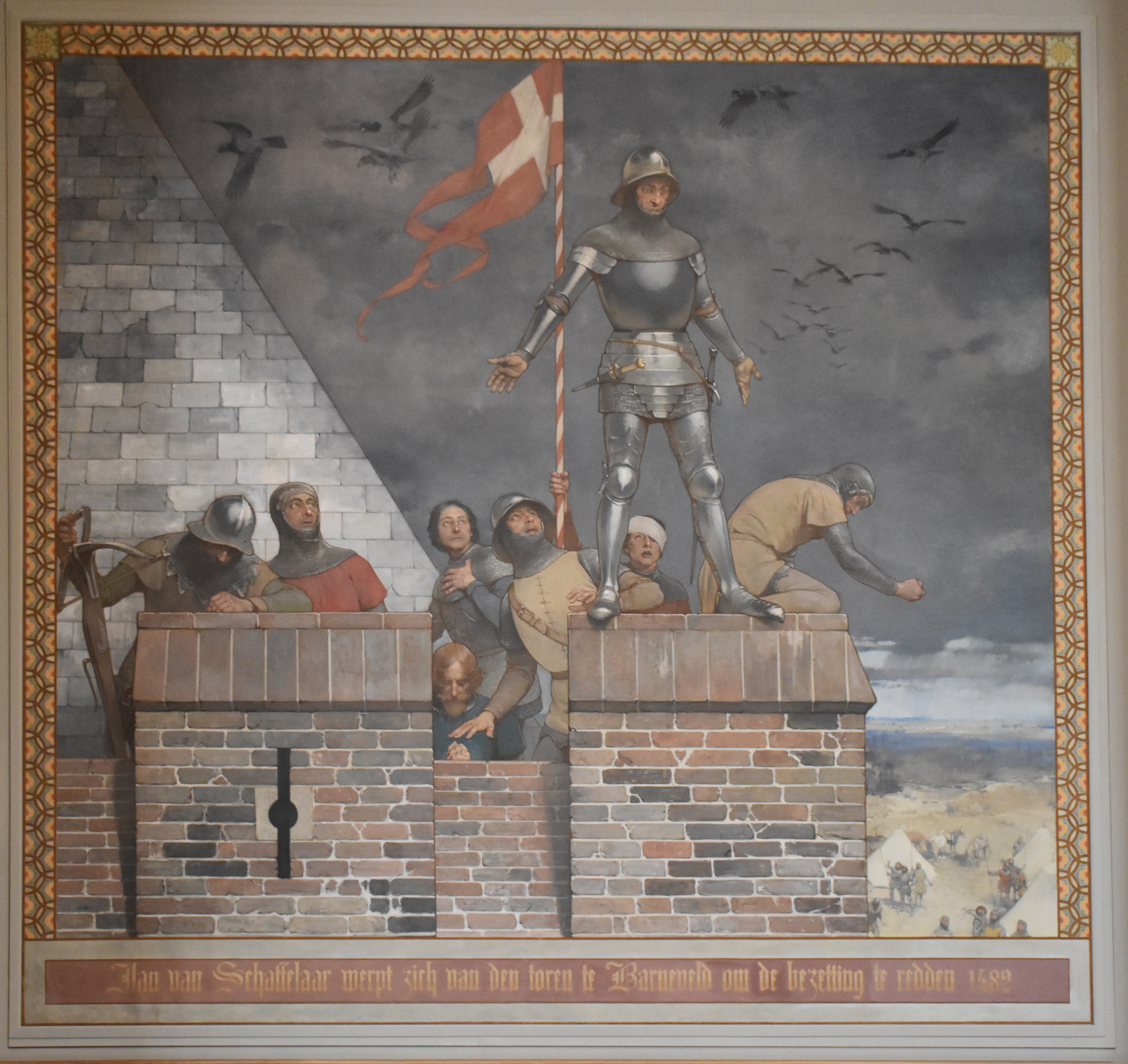
- The jump of Jan van Schaffelaar
Date	1481 – 1483
Location	Prince-Bishopric of Utrecht
Result	Burgundy retains power in Utrecht

Belligerents
Burgundy; Cod faction	Duchy of Cleves; Hook faction

Commanders and leaders
David of Burgundy; Maximilian I, Holy Roman Emperor; Joost de Lalaing	Engelbert of Cleves; Jan III van Montfoort

The Utrecht war of 1481–83 (Dutch: Stichtse Oorlog or Driejarige Oorlog, German: Utrechter Stiftsfehde) was a diocesan feud in the Prince-Bishopric of Utrecht between 1481 and 1483, influenced by the ongoing Hook and Cod wars in the neighbouring County of Holland. It was also a battle for control over Utrecht between the Dukes of Burgundy in the person of ruling Bishop David of Burgundy, and the Duchy of Cleves, which sought to replace him with Engelbert of Cleves.

== Prelude ==
The Utrecht War (1456–1458) had been decided in favour of David of Burgundy, one of the candidates to succeed Rudolf van Diepholt. The unexpected death of Burgundian Duke Charles the Bold in 1477, who was succeeded by his young and inexperienced daughter Mary of Burgundy, opened the floodgates of latent anti-Burgundian sentiments in the Netherlands. Jan III van Montfoort declared David of Burgundy no longer welcome in the city of Utrecht or in the other cities of the Bishopric and he retired with his partisans to his favourite castle in Wijk bij Duurstede.

== 1481 ==
Simultaneous to this battle of wills in the Sticht, war broke out in Holland between the anti-Burgundian Hook and the pro-Burgundian Cod leagues. Archduke Maximilian I of Habsburg, who had married the Burgundian heiress, Mary of Burgundy, shortly after her father's death, faced threats to the Burgundian heritage from all sides and was initially unable to intervene decisively in Holland. The Hook party in Holland was led by Reinier van Broeckhuysen, a nephew of the former Bishop-Elect Gijsbrecht van Brederode. In 1481 Reinier managed to shortly capture Leiden with an army of Hook exiles but was ultimately forced to abandon the city to the more powerful Habsburg forces. He and his army then sought refuge in the Sticht where they stood under the protection of the energetic and ferocious Viscount Jan of Montfoort, leader of the anti-Burgundian forces in the bishopric. The Viscount, with the support of the Zoudenbalchs and other anti-Burgundian notables, then effectively staged a coup in the city government of Utrecht, ejecting the pro-Burgundian regents from their offices and thus ensuring that the council was fully committed to the Hook cause. War between the Burgundian's Habsburg heirs and the Hooks of Holland and Utrecht became inevitable.

In late 1481 the forces of Archduke Maximilian, under the leadership of Frederik van Egmond, Lord of Egmond and IJsselstein, began to ravage the Sticht and the countryside around Utrecht in particular. On 26 December Joost van Lalaing won an important victory in the Battle of Westbroek.

== 1482 ==
The Hooks of Utrecht were well aware of the weakness of their position and they thus sought an alliance with King Louis XI of France, the arch-enemy of Maximilian - but ultimately to no avail. The Hooks also sought to draw John I, the ambitious Duke of Cleves, into the conflict. The Duke supported the cause of the Utrecht Hooks cautiously but not outrightly, sending his younger son, Engelbert, to join the Hook forces with the aim of becoming the new bishop. David of Burgundy at that time could only count on Frederik van Egmond. Maximilian, at war with France, could only send some detachments of cavalry to cut the lines of supplies to the city of Utrecht. It is during one of the raids that Jan van Schaffelaar was killed in Barneveld. By the end of the year, peace with France was signed, and Maximilian could again send more troops to the Netherlands.

== 1483 ==
The peace party in Utrecht then imprisoned Jan van Montfoort and Engelbert of Cleves, and gave back the power to David of Burgundy. Only back in control of the city of Utrecht since 21 April 1483, Prince-Bishop David of Burgundy was surprised in his old episcopal palace by a daring and stealthy night raid of the Hooks on 8 May. The Prince-Bishop was captured and imprisoned in Amersfoort.
When Maximilian of Austria heard this news, he formed a large army under Joost de Lalaing to besiege Utrecht. After two months of siege, the city surrendered and a peace treaty was signed.

== Aftermath ==
David of Burgundy was again restored as Bishop and remained in this function until his death in 1496. The situation in Utrecht remained very volatile and a new unsuccessful rebellion under Frans van Brederode broke out between 1488 and 1490. During the Guelders Wars, Utrecht was controlled for some time by the Duchy of Guelders, but became part of the Habsburg Seventeen Provinces in 1528, as the Lordship of Utrecht.
