= Utrecht (province) =

Province of the Netherlands

Utrecht Utrecht (Dutch)
- Province
- Province of Utrecht; Provincie Utrecht (Dutch)
- Flag Coat of arms Brandmark
- Anthem: Langs de Vecht en d'oude Rijnstroom
- Location of Utrecht in the Netherlands

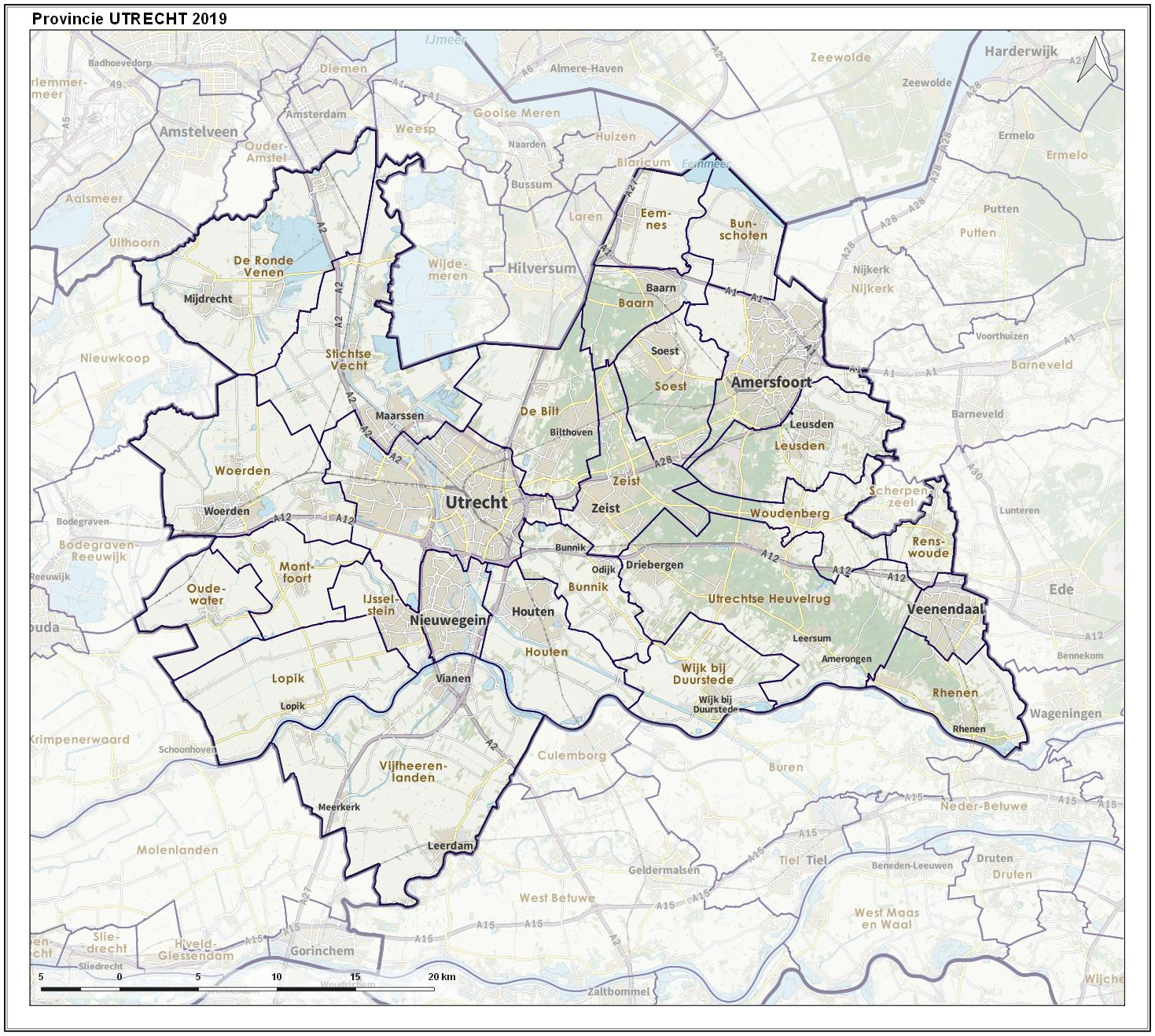
- Topography map of Utrecht
- Coordinates: 52°6′12″N 5°10′45″E
- Country: Netherlands
- Capital (and largest city): Utrecht

Government
  - King's Commissioner: Hans Oosters (PvdA)
  - Council: Provincial Council of Utrecht

Area (2023)
  - Total: 1,560 km^{2} (600 sq mi)
  - Land: 1,484 km^{2} (573 sq mi)
  - Water: 76 km^{2} (29 sq mi)
  - Rank: 12th

Population (1 January 2023)
  - Total: 1,387,643
  - Rank: 5th
  - Density: 935/km^{2} (2,420/sq mi)
  - Rank: 3rd

GDP
  - Total: €106.260 billion (2024)
  - Per capita: €75,415 (2024)
- ISO 3166 code: NL-UT
- HDI (2023): 0.969 very high · 1st of 12
- Website: www.provincie-utrecht.nl

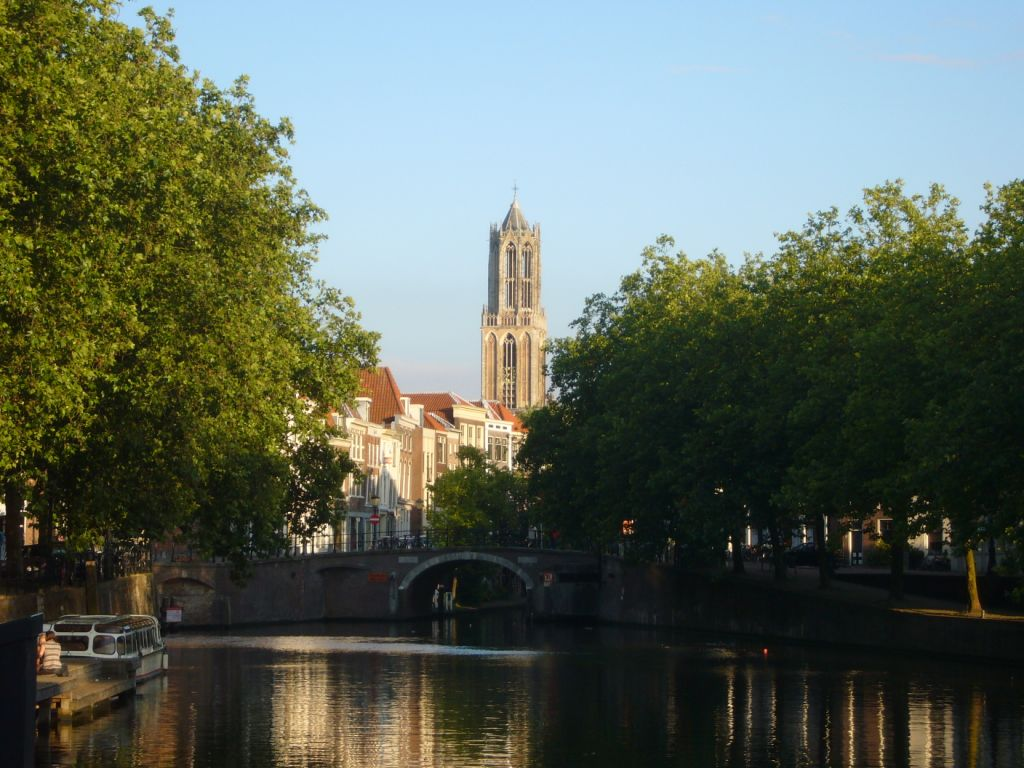
Dom Tower in the city of Utrecht.

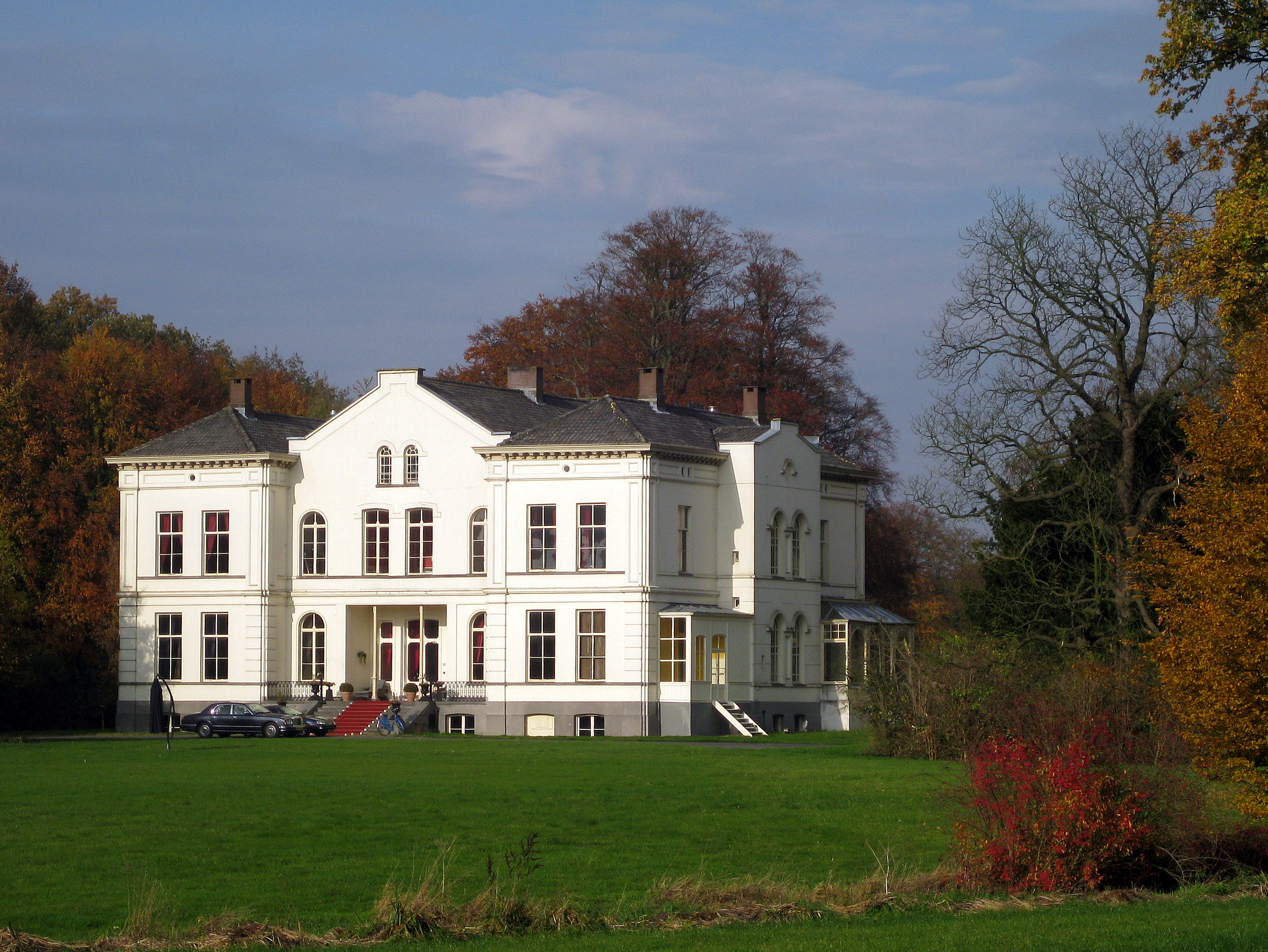
Wulperhorst Mansion near Zeist.

Utrecht (Dutch pronunciation: [ˈytrɛxt]), officially the Province of Utrecht (Dutch: Provincie Utrecht), is a province of the Netherlands. It is located in the centre of the country, bordering the Eemmeer in the north-east, the province of Gelderland in the east and south-east, the province of South Holland in the west and south-west and the province of North Holland in the north-west and north. The province of Utrecht has a population of about 1,388,000 as of January 2023. With a land area of approximately 1,484 square kilometres (573 sq mi), it is the second smallest province in the country. Apart from its eponymous capital, major cities and towns in the province are Amersfoort, Houten, IJsselstein, Nieuwegein, Veenendaal and Zeist. The busiest railway station in the Netherlands, Utrecht Centraal, is located in the province of Utrecht.

== History ==
The Bishopric of Utrecht was established in 695 when Saint Willibrord was consecrated bishop of the Frisians at Rome by Pope Sergius I. With the consent of the Frankish ruler, Pippin of Herstal, he settled in an old Roman fort in Utrecht. After Willibrord's death the diocese suffered greatly from the incursions of the Vikings. Better times appeared during the reign of the Saxon emperors, who frequently summoned the Bishops of Utrecht to attend the imperial councils and diets. In 1024 the bishops were made Princes of the Holy Roman Empire and the new Prince-Bishopric of Utrecht was formed. In 1122, with the Concordat of Worms, the Emperor's right of investiture was annulled, and the cathedral chapter received the right to elect the bishop. It was, however, soon obligated to share this right with the four other collegiate chapters in the city. The Counts of Holland and Guelders, between whose territories the lands of the Bishops of Utrecht lay, also sought to acquire influence over the filling of the episcopal see. This often led to disputes and consequently the Holy See frequently interfered in the election. After the middle of the 14th century the popes repeatedly appointed the bishop directly without regard to the five chapters.

During the Hook and Cod Wars, Utrecht was fought over by forces of the Duke of Burgundy leading to the First Utrecht Civil War (1470–1474) and Second Utrecht Civil War (1481–1483).

In 1527, the Bishop sold his territories, and thus his secular authority, to Holy Roman Emperor Charles V and the principality became an integral part of the Habsburg dominions, which already included most other Dutch provinces. The chapters transferred their right of electing the bishop to Charles V and his government, a measure to which Pope Clement VII gave his consent, under political pressure after the Sack of Rome. However, the Habsburg rule did not last long, as Utrecht joined in the Dutch Revolt against Charles' successor Philip II in 1579, becoming a part of the Dutch Republic. The States of Utrecht were the only provincial estates in which the clergy remained nominally represented as the First Estate. This representation took the form of geëligeerden (all Protestants), delegated by the secularised chapters of five collegiate churches that administered extensive landed estates.

In World War II, Utrecht was held by German forces until the general capitulation of the Germans in the Netherlands on May 5, 1945. It was occupied by Canadian Allied forces on May 7, 1945. The towns of Oudewater, Woerden, Vianen and Leerdam were transferred from the province of South Holland to Utrecht in 1970, 1989, 2002 and 2019 respectively. In February 2011, Utrecht, together with the provinces of North Holland and Flevoland, showed a desire to investigate the feasibility of a merger between the three provinces. This has been positively received by the Dutch cabinet, for the desire to create one Randstad province has already been mentioned in the coalition agreement. The province of South Holland, part of the Randstad urban area, visioned to be part of the Randstad province, and very much supportive of the idea of a merger into one province, is not named. With or without South Holland, if created, the new province would be the largest in the Netherlands in both area and population.

== Geography ==
In the east of Utrecht lies the Utrecht Hill Ridge (Dutch: Utrechtse Heuvelrug), a chain of hills left as lateral moraine by tongues of glacial ice after the Saline glaciation that preceded the last ice age. Because of the scarcity of nutrients in the fast-draining sandy soil, the greatest part of a landscape that was formerly heath has been planted with pine plantations. The south of the province is a river landscape. The west consists mostly of meadows. In the north are big lakes formed by the digging of peat from bogs formed after the last ice age; these lakes are now popular recreational areas for boating, fishing, and water sports.

=== Nature ===
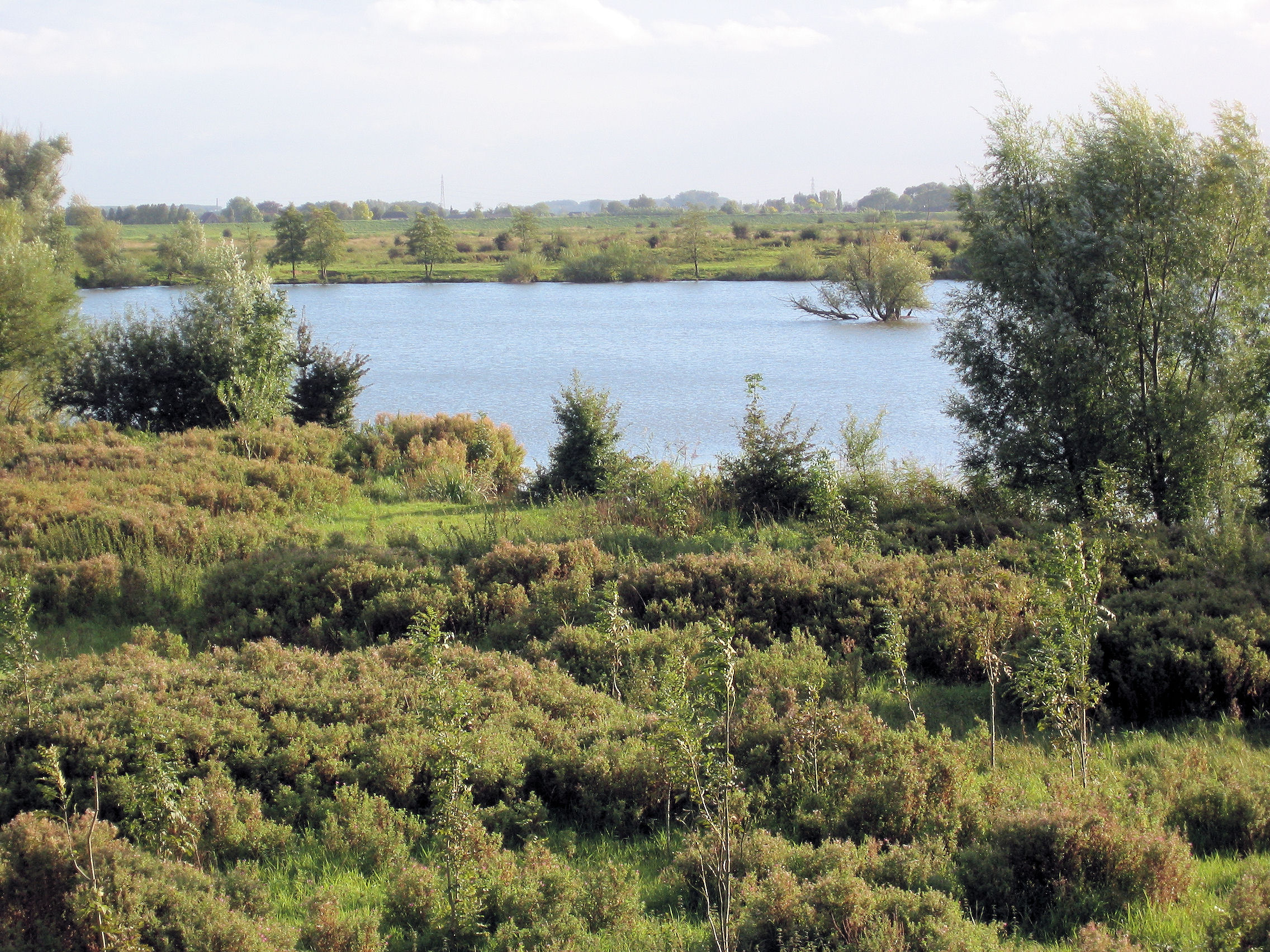
A site in Utrecht's nature reserve, Blauwe Kamer near Rhenen

One of the most attractive natural areas in the province is the Vechtstreek ("Vecht region"), situated on either side of the Vecht river.

An international nature conservation organisation that has settled the head office of its Netherlands branch in this province (at Zeist) is the WWF.

"Natuur en Milieu" ("Nature and Environment") is a national nature protection organisation whose head office is in this province (at Utrecht city).

=== Municipalities ===
The Province of Utrecht is divided into 26 municipalities.

- Amersfoort
- Baarn
- Bunnik
- Bunschoten
- De Bilt
- De Ronde Venen
- Eemnes
- Houten
- IJsselstein
- Leusden
- Lopik
- Montfoort
- Nieuwegein
- Oudewater
- Renswoude
- Rhenen
- Soest
- Stichtse Vecht
- Utrecht
- Utrechtse Heuvelrug
- Veenendaal
- Vianen
- Vijfheerenlanden
- Wijk bij Duurstede
- Woerden
- Woudenberg
- Zeist

== Demographics ==
Historical population
Year	Pop.	±%
1950	573,422	—
1960	676,889	+18.0%
1970	801,285	+18.4%
1980	895,464	+11.8%
1990	1,015,515	+13.4%
2000	1,107,849	+9.1%
2010	1,220,910	+10.2%
2020	1,354,834	+11.0%
Source: Population dynamics; birth, death and migration per region, CBS StatLine

Population of the province of Utrecht by country of birth of the parents of citizens (2020)
Country/Territory	Population
Netherlands	1,036,856 (76.53%)
Morocco	57,563 (4.24%)
Indonesia	31,934 (2.35%)
Turkey	30,783 (2.27%)
Germany	20,089 (1.48%)
Suriname	19,441 (1.43%)
(Netherlands) Dutch Caribbean	9,063 (0.67%)
Poland	8,006 (0.59%)
Soviet Union	6,873 (0.50%)
(United Kingdom) UK	6,864 (0.50%)
China (Note: Excluding Hong Kong and Macau)	6,276 (0.46%)
(Socialist Federal Republic of Yugoslavia) Yugoslavia	6,201 (0.45%)
Belgium	5,759 (0.43%)
Iraq	5,145 (0.38%)
India	5,071 (0.37%)
Other	98,910 (7.30%)

== Religion ==
Religion in Utrecht (province) (2015)
1. Not religious (54.3%)
2. Protestant Church in the Netherlands (20.3%)
3. Roman Catholicism (13.2%)
4. Other (6.60%)
5. Islam (5.60%)

In 2015, 20.3% of the population belonged to the Protestant Church in the Netherlands, while 13.2% were Roman Catholic, 6.6% belonged to other churches or faiths, and 5.6% were Muslim. Over half of the population (54.3%) identified as non-religious.

== Economy ==
The Gross domestic product (GDP) of the region was 71.5 billion € in 2018, accounting for 9.2% of the Netherlands economic output. GDP per capita adjusted for purchasing power was 47,900 € or 159% of the EU27 average in the same year.

== Anthem ==
Langs de Vecht en d'oude Rijnstroom is the de facto provincial anthem of Utrecht. Its text was written in 1952 by the provincial employee Jan Küppers, on the melody of "Angels from the Realms of Glory" by the British 19th-century composer Henry Smart. The song references the Utrecht rivers Vecht and Old Rhine, as well Willibrord, the first Bishop of Utrecht, who laid the province's foundation.

Lyrics

Langs de d'oude Rijnstroom
Strekt zich wijd het Stichtse land.
Willibrord ontstak uw fakkel,
Die onblusbaar verder brandt;
Waar 's Lands Unie werd geboren,
Utrecht, hart van Nederland!

Utrecht, parel der gewesten,
'k Min uw bos en lustwarand'.
'n Eigen stempel draagt uw landschap:
Plas, rivier of heid' en zand,
Weid' en bongerd, bont verscheiden,
Utrecht, hart van Nederland!

Utrecht, nobel, nijver Utrecht,
Middelpunt naar alle kant,
Aan uw eigen stijl en schoonheid
Houd ik steeds mijn zin verpand.
Blijv' in goed' en kwade dagen:
Utrecht, hart van Nederland!

Translation:

Along the old Rhine stream
Extends the Sticht land wide.
Willibrord lit thy torch,
Which quenchless burns further;
Where the country's union was born,
Utrecht, heart of Netherland!

Utrecht, pearl of regions,
I cherish thy forest and leisure ground,
An own mark carries thy landscape:
Puddle, river, or heath and sand,
Meadow and orchard, bright varied,
Utrecht, heart of Netherland!

Utrecht, noble, diligent Utrecht,
Midpoint to each side,
To thy own style and beauty
I keep pledged my word.
Remaining in good and bad times:
Utrecht, heart of Netherland!

== Notable residents ==
- Pope Adrian VI (1459–1523), the only Dutch pope.
- C. H. D. Buys Ballot (1817–1890), Dutch chemist and meteorologist.
- Mohamed Ihattaren (born 2002), Dutch professional footballer
- Piet Mondrian (1872–1944), Dutch painter
- Gerrit Rietveld (1888–1964), Dutch furniture designer and architect
- Marco van Basten (born 1964), Dutch football manager
- Theo van Doesburg (1883–1931), Dutch artist
