= Jan III van Montfoort =

- Montfoort coat of arms
- Died: 1522
- Spouses: Wilhelmina van Naaldwijk, Charlotte van Brederode
- Father: Henry IV van Montfoort
- Mother: Margretha van Croy

Jan III van Montfoort (or Johan van Montfoort), (c. 1448 – 28 March 1522) was Viscount of Montfoort, Free Lord of Zuid-Polsbroek, Free Lord of Purmerend-Purmerland, and a leader of the Hook Party in the Bishopric of Utrecht.

He was the son of Henry IV van Montfoort and Margretha van Croy.
Jan van Montfoort opposed the Burgundian rule of the Utrecht in the person of Bishop David of Burgundy. This led to the First Utrecht Civil War between 1470–1474 and the Second Utrecht Civil War between 1481–1483. After the Siege of Utrecht (1483) peace was concluded but Jan van Montfoort lost his Fiefs of Purmerend-Purmerland and Zuid-Polsbroek, which were confiscated and given to nobles close to Maximilian of Austria.
Van Montfoort supported Frans van Brederode during his failed rebellion between 1488–1490.

Van Montfoort died in 1522 and was buried in the church of Montfoort.

== Marriage and children ==
Jan married on 16 December 1475 with Wilhelmina van Naaldwijk. They had:

- Zweder van Montfoort (1471/72 – before 1500) one of the leaders of the 1488–1490 rebellion.
- Machteld van Montfoort (1475–1550)
- Barbara van Montfoort (1480–1527), married Maximilian of Horne, Lord of Gaasbeek, Knight in the Order of the Golden Fleece.

Jan remarried on 12 June 1509 with Charlotte van Brederode, and had:

- Joost van Montfoort (1510–1539), married Anna van Lalaing (1509–1602)
- Hendrik V van Montfoort (1512–1555), married Anna van Glymes van Bergen (1525–1545), daughter of Anton of Glymes, Knight in the Order of the Golden Fleece.
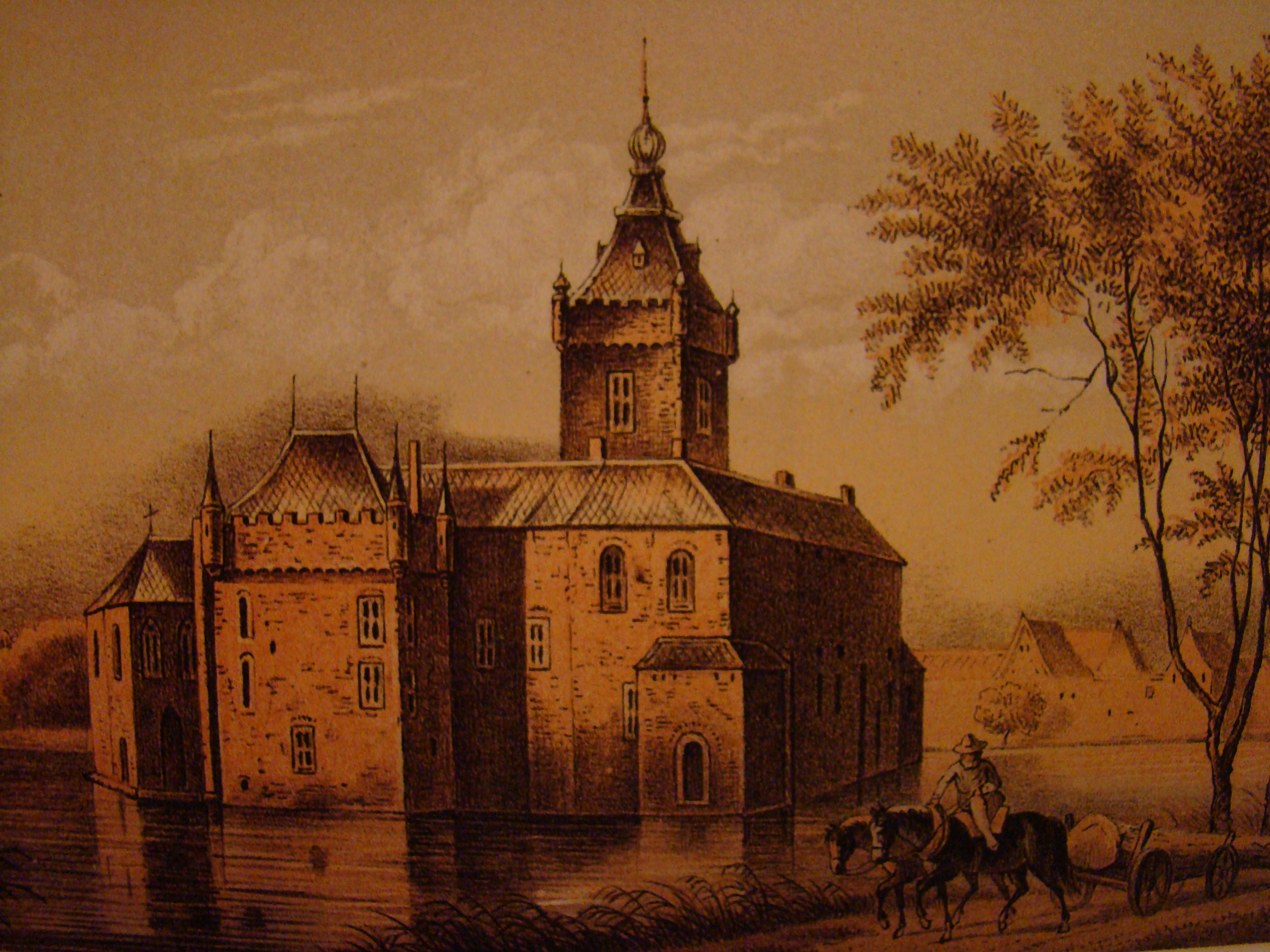
Montfoort castle

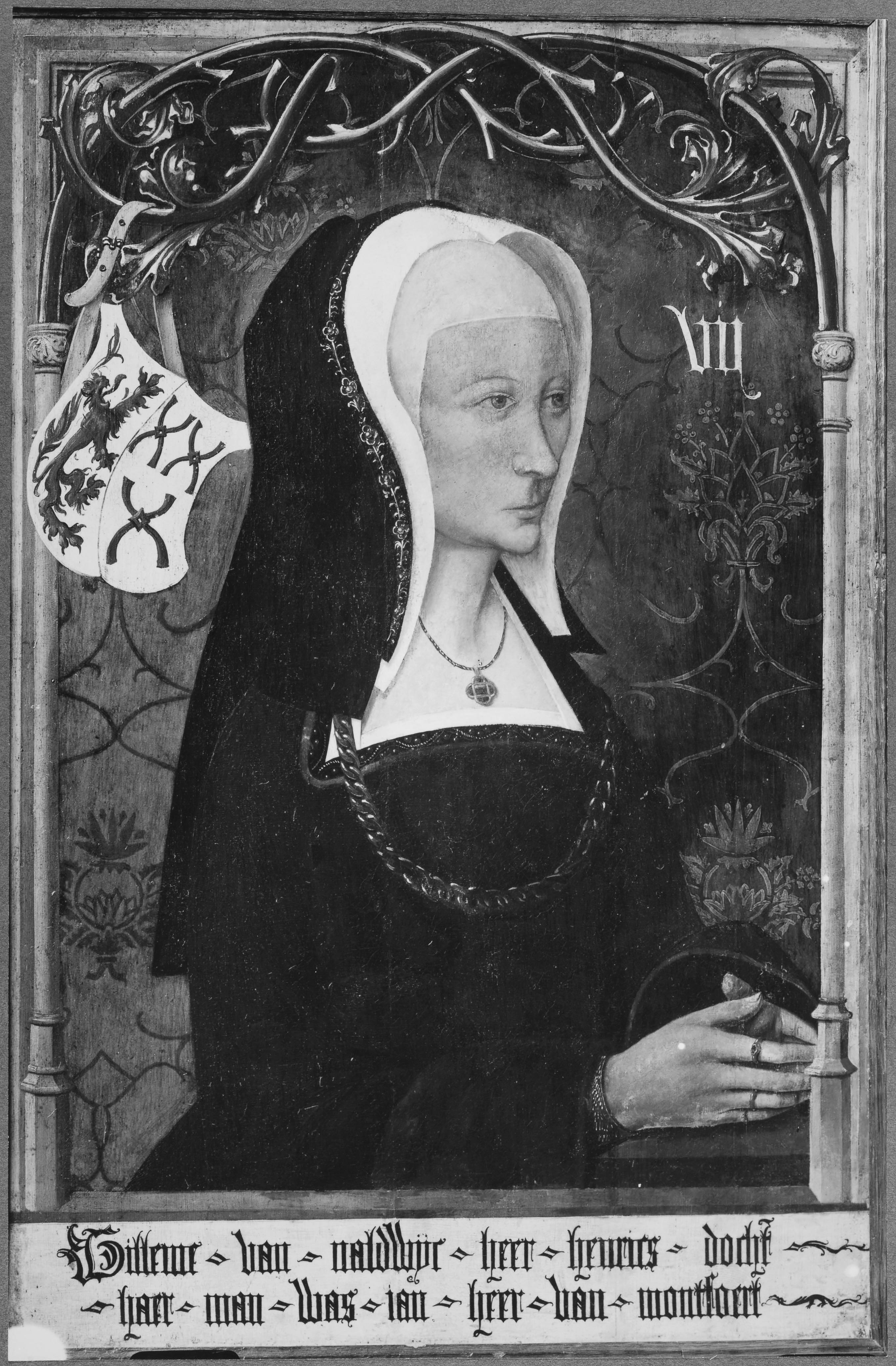
Wilhelmina van Naaldwijk, first wife of Jan van Montfoort
