= Siege of Utrecht =

Siege of Utrecht may refer to:

- Siege of Utrecht (1345), laid by William II, Count of Hainaut
- Siege of Utrecht (1483), during the Hook and Cod wars
