= Battle of Westbroek =

1481 battle of the Hook and Cod Wars

- Part of Hook and Cod wars
Date	26 December 1481
Location	Westbroek
Result	Burgundian victory

Belligerents
Hooks; Utrecht militia	Burgundian State; Cod allies Holland mercenaries

Commanders and leaders
Vincentius van Zwanenburg	Joost de Lalaing; David of Burgundy

Strength
1,500–2,000 men	4,000–5,000 men

Casualties and losses
500	Unknown

The Battle of Westbroek occurred on 26 December 1481 between the armies of the prince-bishopric of Utrecht and the county of Holland. It was one of the last battles of the Hook and Cod wars.

That war had already been won by the Cods and their Burgundian allies. In Utrecht, however, the Hooks revolted and seized the bishop, David of Burgundy at the outbreak of the Second Utrecht Civil War. Holy Roman Emperor Maximilian I then won the bishop's freedom.

On 26 December 1481, Bishop David sent an army of 4,000 to 5,000 men to retake Utrecht. When his forces reached the village of Westbroek on the northern edge of Utrecht, they burned the village to the ground and killed the inhabitants. An armed mob formed in Utrecht and headed toward Westbroek to take revenge. When the mob saw the size of David's army, it tried to flee back to the city. Bishop David's army pursued them and killed everybody they could. Sources vary widely on the number of deaths, from 50 prisoners and 100 dead to 500 dead to 1,500 dead.
