= Jan van Schaffelaar =

Jan van Schaffelaar (Arnhem, 1445 – Barneveld, 1482) was a cavalry officer in the duchy of Guelders (or Gelre), the Netherlands. Born in the region of Barneveld in the Veluwe Quarter about 1445, he was in the military service of David of Burgundy, the Bishop of Utrecht during the region's factional war known as the Hook and Cod Wars. He famously jumped to his death to spare his besieged troops.

== Historical significance ==
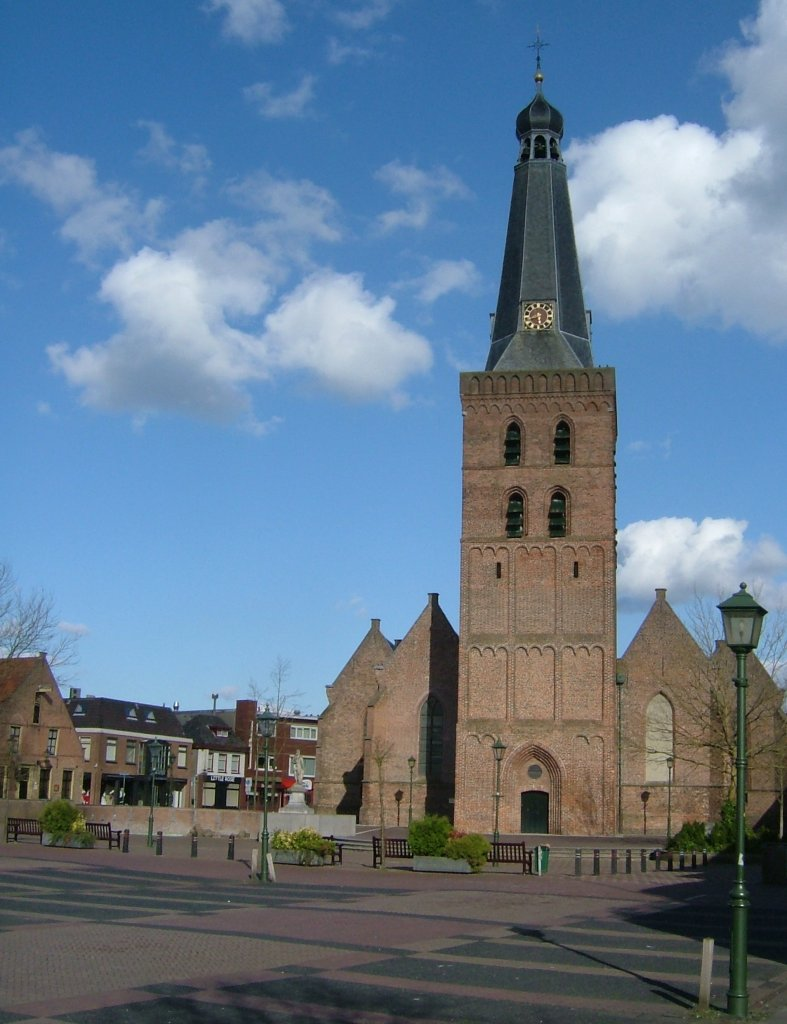
The church Jan van Schaffelaar jumped off, as it is today. Van Schaffelaar's monument can be seen slightly left of the church.

The oldest still existing historical record of Van Schaffelaar's actions can be found in the Utrecht Chronicle ("Utrechse Kroniek") titled "Annales Rerum in Hollandia et Dioceso Ultratrajectina gestarum Ann.MCCCCLXXXI et duobus seqq. auctore incerto sed accurato et aequali eorum temporum" ("Almanac of Holland-Utrecht Occurrences 1481-83, from the pen of an anonymous but trustworthy and contemporary author"), first published by the 17th-century Utrecht historian Antonius Matthaeus III in his series "Veteris aevi analecta" in 1698. According to this chronicle, on July 16, 1482, Cod troops from castle Rosendael near Arnhem under the command of Jan van Schaffelaar got into conflict with Hook troops from Amersfoort and Nijkerk. The troops from Rosendael captured the church and tower of the village of Barneveld, but they were shot at with cannons, killing four or five. After negotiations, their opponents stated that they would accept their surrender only if the defenders would throw their commander from the tower. The men were unwilling to do so, but Van Schaffelaar stated that he would have to die some day and that he did not want to cause his men trouble. Having said this, he put his hands to his sides and jumped off the tower. Despite the great height of the tower he was not immediately killed, but was finished off by his enemies.

Other versions expand on this account by stating that the troops under Van Schaffelaar were promised safe passage from the tower. In some versions, the demand was that Van Schaffelaar be turned in. Van Schaffelaar surprised his opponents by turning himself in to his enemies in such a way that he would not be alive for long.

When the church was restored in 1978, the grave of Jan van Domselaar was opened. It was assumed that in this grave actually were the remains of Jan van Schaffelaar. Inspection of the skull suggested that Van Schaffelaar was shot after his fall, causing a pin from his visor to enter his skull. He died because of internal bleeding caused by his fall or a blow from a weapon. He was initially buried in a mass grave near the tower and later transferred to the family grave of the Hackfort family in the choir of the church (Prins 1981, 1982). Later research made this assumption unlikely. (Janse 2003) It has been a challenge to identify this late 15th-century warrior in contemporary historical documents, but historical anthropologist A.H.J. Prins, who grew up in Barneveld, found the name Van Schaffelaar in a 1476 muster roll in the Archives Nationales in Paris. Recorded in French, this roll identifies Van Schaffelaar as a heavily armed "francqenet" (knight) in 1476, en route on horseback to Lausanne, Switzerland, ready to command an infantry troop in an army commanded by Charles the Bold, the Duke of Burgundy. But, his large army was defeated by the Duke of Lorraine and a large Swiss army.

== Recognition ==
Jan van Schaffelaar became a minor Dutch hero. He features in several novels and poems, De Schaapherder by Jan Frederik Oltmans (nl) and Hasse Simonsdochter by Thea Beckman being some of the better known ones.

On September 15, 1903, among great festivities, a statue was erected in his honour near the tower that he jumped from. It was hewn by Bart van Hove after a design by H. ten Ham E. Jzn.

An illustration of this event can be found in the great hall of the Rijksmuseum in Amsterdam.

== Name ==
Jan van Schaffelaar is sometimes written as Jan van Schaffelaer or Jan van Scaffelaer (archaic).
