= Siege of Deventer (1456) =

1456 siege in Europe

- Part of Hook and Cod wars
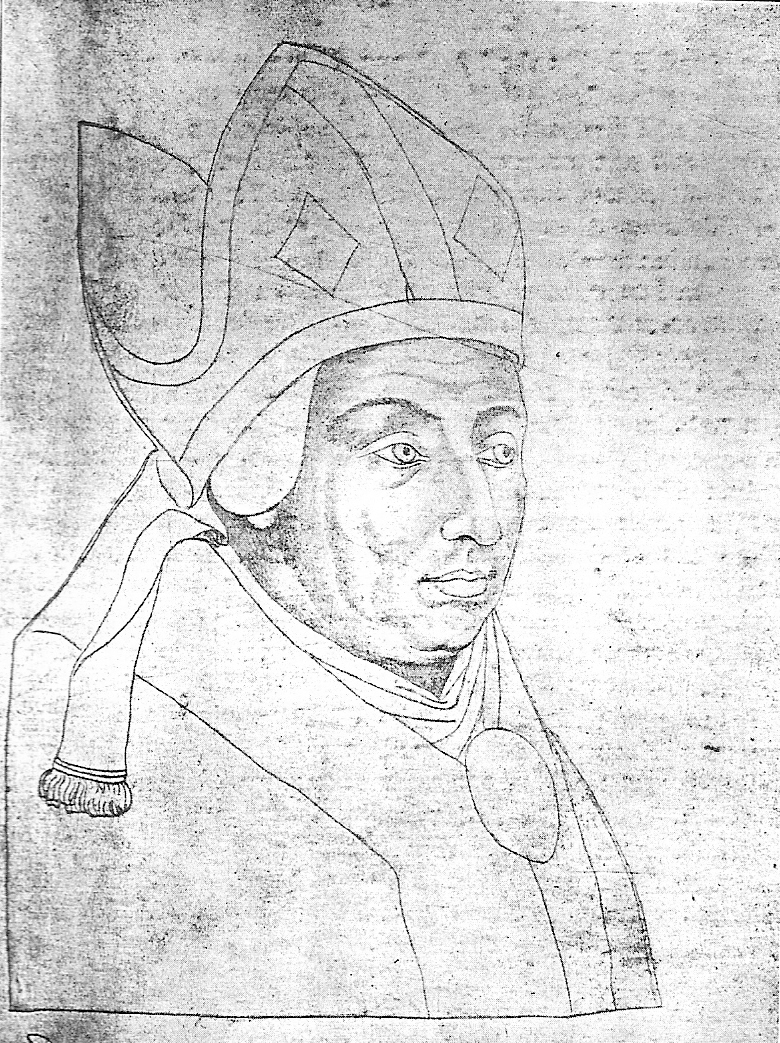
- Bishop David of Burgundy
Date	14 August – 15 September 1456
Location	Deventer, Overijssel 52°15′N 6°9′E
Result	Burgundian victory

Belligerents
Prince-Bishopric of Utrecht; Hooks	Burgundian State; Cod allies

Commanders and leaders
Gijsbrecht van Brederode; Konrad III von Diepholz	Philip the Good; David of Burgundy; John I, Duke of Cleves

Strength
2,000	14,000

Casualties and losses
Unknown	Unknown

The siege of Deventer was a siege of Deventer (then a major Hanseatic city) in 1456 during a struggle between Duke Philip the Good of Burgundy and the church, the nobility, and cities of the Oversticht (Overijssel) that included Kampen, Zwolle and Deventer.

== Background ==
Over the 15th century the Dukes of Burgundy became more and more influential in the Netherlands, striving for a stronger and more centralised grip on the country. In 1456 Duke Philip the Good made his illegitimate son David of Burgundy to be the successor of Rudolf van Diepholt as bishop of Utrecht, with the approval of Pope Callixtus III.

Overijssel's cities and nobility resented a Burgundian overlord, who was moreover born out of wedlock, and planned not to recognise Philip's choice, with the chapters of the Prince-Bishopric of Utrecht favouring another candidate, Gijsbrecht of Brederode. Philip the Good subsequently took up arms and had Deventer, then a prominent Hanseatic city and the most important place in the Oversticht, besieged for five weeks to push through his will.

== The Siege ==
The siege began on Friday, August 14, 1456. Deventer was a well-defensible city with two ring walls. The siege did not come entirely unexpectedly because of the bishops' dispute. Food supplies had been stockpiled and a redoubt had been built on the western bank, at the site of the current Bolwerksmolen, opposite the city. In addition to the citizen-manned militia, about 80 nobles with about 600 cavalrymen from the Oversticht were stationed in Deventer for defense. Another 1,000 soldiers, mostly farmers and servants, came from Groningen and Drenthe, and 260 men came from the Prince-Bishopric of Utrecht to help defend the city. The city had also sent a messenger to the Duke of Guelders asking for help. He promised assistance, but ultimately did not show up. A number of cities in Holland, such as Amsterdam, Leiden, Haarlem and Hoorn, were also written to, but no response came from these either.

Duke Philip the Good approached the city with an army of 14,000 men, which he stationed in three camps near Deventer. He established his headquarters at the village and house of Wilp. Units of Flemish, Dutch, and Zeeland mercenaries encamped southeast of the city of Deventer, on the island of Fennenoord in the IJssel, near the Koerhuis lookout post. A third group, led by the Duke of Cleves, was located west of the city in De Hoven and Stadsland.

The day after his arrival, Philip sent troops in small boats to the opposite bank of the IJssel. In the city, a sortie was immediately decided upon, but Philip's men managed to repel this attack. A sortie was also launched later that day from the Deventer redoubt on the left bank of the river. During this, 43 of Philip's men were taken prisoner. In the evening, however, Philip's forces subjected the redoubt to such heavy fire from artillery cannonballs and stones that the entire post threatened to collapse. The defenders then decided to set the fortification on fire and flee to the city. The Koerhuis, located south of the city on the eastern bank, the watchtower that controlled the passage in the Sallandse Landwehr, was also captured by Philip's men. This allowed the Duke to get closer. He had six positions built on the south side of the city as a protective and defensive line during the siege.

Morale was high in the city of Deventer, partly due to the arrival of Bishop Koenraad van Diepholt and his Westphalian troops. The bishop was a nephew of the recently deceased Rudolf van Diepholt and also a former provost of the Deventer Cathedral and leader of the Oversticht nobles. His men distinguished themselves positively in defending the city. Philip the Good's besieging troops unexpectedly faced high water because the IJssel overflowed its banks. The men had to wade through the water to move through the line and were unable to advance toward the city walls. By mid-September the water had receded and Philip's army was able to build new positions closer to the city. Slingshots such as trebuchets and sling-arm catapults battered the city walls so heavily that the defenders began to consider surrender. To initiate negotiations, two monks were deployed to shuttle between the two camps as messengers.

== Aftermath ==
The city was eventually forced to surrender. David was appointed as Deventer's temporal and spiritual overlord. In a treaty concluded on September 17, David stipulated that he recognized all Oversticht cities, such as Deventer, Zwolle, Kampen, and Groningen, as well as the knighthood, in all their existing privileges. The bishop was subsequently received in the city with all honors.

== Bibliography ==
- de Lange, J. (1837). Overijsselsche almanak voor oudheid en letteren (in Dutch). Vol. 2, 5. Palma de Mallorca: Royal Library of the Netherlands. pp. 77–96.
