= A. H. J. Prins =

Dutch Africanist and maritime anthropologist

- Born: Adriaan Hendrik Johan Prins; 1921; Harderwijk, Gelderland, Netherlands
- Died: 11 February 2000 (aged 78–79)
- Occupation: Anthropologist
- Spouse: Ita Prins
- Children: Harald Prins

Academic background
- Education: University of Utrecht
- Doctoral advisor: Henri Th. Fischer

Academic work
- Discipline: Anthropologist, Africanist
- Institutions: University of Groningen
- Military career
- Allegiance: Allies of World War II
- Branch: Intelligence
- Units: MI9, 21st Army Group

Adriaan Hendrik Johan Prins (1921 – 11 February 2000) was a Dutch Africanist and maritime anthropologist.

He was a recipient of many research grants and fellowships (UNESCO, Ford Foundation, the Netherlands Organization for Pure Research, etc.), Prins was frequently consulted by the Dutch government and royal court, who valued his wealth of knowledge about the peoples and cultures of Africa and the Middle East.

In addition to scores of encyclopedia entries and dozens of scholarly articles in a wide range of international journals such as Anthropos, Man, Human Organization, and The Mariner’s Mirror, Prins regularly published in Dutch newspapers and magazines. Moreover, he illustrated many of his books and articles with his ethnographic photographs, sketches, and pen drawings.

== Early life and education ==
Prins studied social geography and ethnology at the University of Utrecht under Prof. Dr. Henri Th. Fischer.

In 1943, the German occupying forces ordered Dutch students and faculty to sign a "loyalty declaration". Like many others, Prins refused and joined the resistance movement, ultimately becoming chief of intelligence in the VIth Brigade (Veluwe). He was known as "Peter", his nom de guerre. Following the 1944 Battle of Arnhem, he was incorporated into the British Intelligence Section (MI9), a department of the War Office tasked with aiding resistance fighters in enemy-occupied territories. Given the rank of first lieutenant, he served in the Intelligence Branch of the General Staff of the 21st Army Group, commanded by Montgomery.

After demobilization in 1945, he resumed graduate studies at Utrecht. A year later, having acquired his doctoraal degree, he became a research assistant at Utrecht's Institute of Ethnology under Fischer. In 1947, he received a fellowship at the London School of Economics for social anthropology training under Raymond Firth, Siegfried Nadel, and Audrey Richards. Then, equipped with language training in Swahili, he travelled to Kenya as a British Colonial Fellow for ethnographic research in the Teita Hills. Guided by Senior District Commissioner Harold E. Lambert, an anthropologist and linguist specialized in the Swahili and Kikuyu languages, Prins began his fieldwork. Later, he dedicated one of his books to Lambert. Although Prins focused initially on British anthropological topics, such as kinship and social structure, his enduring interest concerned the maritime history and cultural ecology of seafaring peoples.

== Career ==
In 1951, two years before earning his PhD from Utrecht, Prins was hired as the first anthropologist at the University of Groningen, where he later became the founding director of the Institute of Cultural Anthropology. Although he lectured at many institutions in Europe, East Africa, and the Middle East, he remained there until his retirement in 1984.

=== Fieldwork ===
A committed fieldworker, Prins made numerous journeys abroad during and after his tenure in Groningen. In 1957, he began studying dhows, the lateen-rigged sailing ships of the Indian Ocean and how they operate, first in the Persian Gulf, then on the coast of Zanzibar, Kenya and Tanganyika (1957, 1965–66, 1967, 1968, 1970, 1971). Other projects involved research in Ethiopia (1954–55), Iraq (1957), Iran (1959), the Persian Gulf (1970, 1973), Syria and Turkey (1961–62, 1970), South Arabia (1970, 1973), Zambia (1972, 1974). One of the founders of the Arctic Centre at Groningen University, he made annual research trips to northern Scandinavia from 1968 to 1992, and beginning in 1970 traveled to Greece and made frequent journeys to the Mediterranean island of Malta.

== Retirement ==
After his retirement in 1984, the Dutch government restructured higher education and terminated the anthropological institute at Groningen University. As an Emeritus Professor, Prins continued various maritime and cultural-historical research projects. He died on 11 February 2000, after five years of illness, the result of a debilitating stroke. Buried in Noordlaren near "Huis ter Aa," his family home in the old rural village of Glimmen south of Groningen City, he was survived by his wife Ita (P.A.C. Prins-Poorter, 1921–2016), nine children, and sixteen grandchildren.

== Selected publications ==
- The Coastal Tribes of the Northeastern Bantu: Pokomo, Nyika, Teita (1952).
- East-African Age-Class Systems: An Inquiry into the Social Order of the Galla, Kipsigis and Kikuyu (1953; reprinted by the Negro Press in 1970)
- "An Analysis of Swahili Kinship Terminology." Journal of the East African Swahili Committee Vol.26:20-27 (1956); Continued, Ibid. Vol.28:9-16 (1958).
- "On Swahili Historiography." Journal of the East African Swahili Committee 28:26-40 (1958).
- "Uncertainties in Coastal Cultural History: The Ngalawa and the Mtepe." Tanganyika Notes and Records 63:204-213 (1959).
- "The Somaliland Bantu." Bulletin of the International Committee on Urgent Anthropological and Ethnological Research 3:28-31 (1960).
- Bibliografie van Harderwijk: Grondslagen voor een verzameling bronnen en publicaties, geannoteerd, bijeengebracht en van een inleiding voorzien (1960).
- The Swahili-speaking Peoples of Zanzibar and the East Coast of Africa (1961, 2nd edition 1967)
- "The Didemic Diarchic Boni." Journal of the Royal Anthropological Institute 93:174-186 (1963).
- "A Carved Headrest of the Cushitic Boni: An Attempted Interpretation." MAN Vol.65:189-191 (1965).
- Sailing from Lamu: A Study of Maritime Culture in Islamic East Africa (1965).
- Schippers van Blokzijl: Een Maritime Maatschappij in Miniatuur (1969).
- "Islamic Maritime Magic: A Ship's Charm from Lamu. Pp.294-304. In: Wort und Religion - Kalima na Dini. (Festschrift fuer Ernst Dammann). Stuttgart:Evangelischer Missionverlag. (1969)
- A Swahili Nautical Dictionary (Preface by Julius Nyerere, 1970).
- "Dutch Maritime Inventiveness and the Chinese Leeboard." The Mariner's Mirror Vol.56:349-353. (1970)
- "Maritime Art in an Islamic Context: Oculus and Therion in Lamu ships." The Mariner's Mirror Vol.56:327-339.
- Didemic Lamu: Social Stratification and Spatial Structure in a Muslim Maritime Town. Groningen: Instituut voor Culturele Antropologie der Rijksuniversiteit (1971).
- "The Shungwaya Problem: Traditional History and Cultural Likeness in Bantu North-East Africa." Anthropos Vol.67:1-2,9-35.
- "The Maritime Middle East: A Century of Studies." The Middle East Journal Vol.27:207-219.(1973)
- "Development in Arctic Boat Design: Efflorescence or Involution?". pp. 12–30. In: Netherlands-Swedish Symposium in Scandinavian Arctic Culture. Groningen: Arctic Centre (1975).
- “The Mtepe of Lamu, Mombasa and the Zanzibar Sea.” pp. 85–100. In: From Zinj to Zanzibar: Studies in History, Trade and Society on the Eastern Coast of Africa.(In Honour of James Kirkman). Eds. J. de V. Allen and Thomas H. Wilson. Paideuma: Mitteilungen zur Kulturkunde vol.28. Wiesbaden: Franz Steiner Verlag, 1982.
- Jan van Schaffelaar: Requiem voor een Gelderse Ruiter (1982)
- Watching the Seaside: Essays on Maritime Anthropology by dr A. H. J. Prins (eds. Durk Hak, Ypie Kroes & Hans Schneymann, 1984).
- Copernicaanse Cultuurkunde: Een Geometrisch Model naar Tri-Sferisch Ontwerp (Assen: Van Gorcum, 1984)
- "Two Trends of Thought in Turkish Maritime Culture: The Ethical Ship and the Magical Galley." The Mariner's Mirror Vol.70:45-58.
- Handbook of Sewn Boats: The Ethnography and Archaeology of Archaic Plank-Built Craft (1984).
- “The future of maritime research: questions of culture and problems of process.” pp. 1–8, in: Sewn plank boats: archaeological and ethnographic papers. McGrail, Sean; Kentley, Eric, eds. Greenwich, London: National Maritime Museum, Archaeological Series No.10; Oxford: British Archaeological Reports International Series 276. (1985)
- In Peril on the Sea: Marine Votive Paintings in the Maltese Islands (1989).
- Groningen: Middeleeuwse Hanzestad vanaf de Waterkant (1994)
- “Mediterranean Ships and Shipping, 1650-1850.” In: The Heyday of Sail: The Merchant Sailing Ship 1650-1830 (1995).

== Sources ==
- “From Tropical Africa to Arctic Scandinavia: A. H. J. Prins as Maritime Anthropologist.” In: Circumpolar Studies 2: 21-28.
- “Dr. A. H. J. Prins as a Maritime Anthropologist: A preliminary appraisal and an introduction.” By Durk Hak, in: Watching the Seaside, 1984:1-10.
- Anthropology News, Vol. 41 (4): 92.
- Anthropology Today, Vol. 16 (3): 25–26.
- Focaal: Tijdschrift voor Antropologie, No.35.
- Trouwborst, Albert A. 2000. "In Memoriam Adriaan Hendrik Johan Prins (1921-2000)." Facta: Sociaal Wetenschappelijk Magazine Vol.5(8):13.
- Mulder, Marten. 2010. "Prins, Prof.Dr. Adriaan Hendrik Johan"
- Aldrick, Judy. 2026. "Dr AHJ Prins, Pioneer of Maritime Anthropology of the Swahili Coast." History of the Kenyan Coast, Issue 35, pp. 1–10.
