= Harold E. Lambert =

British linguist and anthropologist

Harold E. Lambert OBE
- Born: 1893; Pield Heath, UK
- Died: 1967 (aged 73–74)
- Education: Queens' College, Cambridge
- Known for: British linguist and anthropologist in Kenya

Harold E. Lambert OBE (1893–1967) was a British linguist and anthropologist in Kenya.

Born in Pield Heath, raised in Bournemouth, and educated at Queens' College, Cambridge (1912–1915), Lambert served as a platoon commander in the Gloucestershire Regiment during World War I, and was wounded at the Battle of the Somme in July 1916. A year later, the young Lieutenant joined the King's African Rifles in Nyassaland in the East African Campaign against the German army in Tanganyika.

After his demobilization in 1919, Lambert remained in East Africa and was appointed assistant District Commissioner on the southern coast of Kenya. During this period, he studied Swahili history and culture, becoming fluent in the language. Gaining indigenous respect and recognition, he became known as "Sheikh Lambert." His subsequent postings were as District Commissioner in Kiambu, Lamu, Embu, Kenya, Voi, and other places, where he gained an "outstanding" reputation as an administrator known for his "profound" knowledge of indigenous law and culture (especially Kikuyu). In 1939, the British Governor of Kenya nominated Lambert be appointed an Officer of the Order of the British Empire (OBE) and promoted him to Senior District Commissioner.

Controversially, Lambert advocated early initiation for young women in Meru District, involving female genital mutilation (FGM). This was driven by concerns of population growth, and what he saw as an alarming rate of abortions (driven possibly by other material factors) and the idea of using culture to maintain "the well-being and cultural equilibrium of the tribe". This was opposed by the Attorney General in Nairobi. When Lambert left Meru in 1937, he informed his successor that "propaganda" encouraging early initiation had been entirely successful".

Lambert was married to Grace Firr, a trained nurse and daughter of Tom Firr, a famous Huntsman of the Quorn Hunt. After his retirement in 1950, the couple settled in Nairobi. He remained very active as a Swahili language scholar until his death in Nairobi, 1967. Many Africanists, anthropologists and linguists greatly benefited from H.E. Lambert's expert knowledge and generous assistance in the field and in their subsequent research. Among those he mentored were A. H. J. Prins, who did ethnographic research on the Taita and, subsequently, the coastal Swahili, and Philip Gulliver who researched the Turkana.

== Selected publications ==
- The Administrative Use of Indigenous Institutions of the Meru. (1939). 34 pp.
- The Constitution and Personnel of Statutory Institutions in the Meru Native Reserve. (1939). 47 pp.
- Disintegration and Reintegration in the Meru Tribe. (1940). 45 pp.
- The Use of Indigenous Authorities in Tribal Administration: Studies of the Meru in Kenya Colony. (Communications from the School of African Studies No.16, Cape Town: University of Cape Town, 1947)
- Land Tenure Among the Akamba. (1947, African Studies, Vol. 6(4), pp. 131–147, 157–175)
- The Work of an African Chief. (Nairobi 1948)
- The Systems of Land Tenure in the Kikuyu Land Unit (Communications from the School of African Studies No. 22). (Cape Town, 1949)
- The Background to Mau Mau: widespread use of secret oaths in Kenya. (1952)
- "The Taking of Tumbe Town." Journal of the east African Swahili Committee 23:36-45 (1953).
- Kikuyu Social and Political Institutions. (Oxford U Press, 1956)
- "Some Songs from the Northern Kenya Coast." Bulletin of the East African Swahili Committee 26:49-52 (1956).
- Chi-Chifundi: A Dialect of the Southern Kenya Coast. (Kampala: East African Swahili Committee, 1956)
- Ki-Vumba: A Dialect of the Southern Kenya Coast. (Kampala: East African Swahili Committee, 1957)
- Chi-Jomvu and ki-Ngare: Subdialects of the Mombasa Area. (Kampala: East African Swahili Committee, 1958)
- Wimbo wa kiEbrania. (Arusha, 1959)
- "Some Riddles from the Southern Kenya Coast." Swahili 33(1):14-18 (1962).
- "The Beni Dance Songs." Swahili 33(1):180-21 (1962).
- "Some Initiation Songs of the Southern Kenya Coast." Swahili 35(1):49-67 (1965).
- Diwani ya Lambert:Imehaririwa na Mathias E. Mnyampala (Nairobi, 1971)

== Sources ==
- Obituaries. 1967. East African Standard, 30: v: 8; Swahili Vol.37 (2):125.
- Abel, Richard L. 1969. A Bibliography of the Customary Laws of Kenya (with Special Reference to the Laws of Wrongs). Faculty Scholarship Series. Paper 4014.
- Frankl, P.J.L. 1999. "H.E. Lambert (1893–1967): Swahili Scholar of Eminence (being a short biography together with a bibliography of his published work." In Journal of African Cultural Studies 12 (1):47–53.
- Murray, Jocelyn. 1976. "The Church Missionary Society and the 'Female Circumcision' Issue in Kenya, 1929–1932. Journal of Religion in Africa. Vol.8:92–104.
