= Utrecht war (1456–1458) =

War of the Hook and Cod Wars

The Utrecht war of 1456–1458 was a diocesan feud taking place between 1456 and 1458 in the Prince-Bishopric of Utrecht following the death of Rudolf van Diepholt. It can be considered part of the Hook and Cod wars. There was an aftermath from 1470 to 1474.

== Aftermath (1470–1474) ==
David of Burgundy, illegitimate son of Philip the Good, Duke of Burgundy had been appointed as bishop of Utrecht in 1456 with support of the Cods. The Utrecht chapters, however, had elected the Hook-favoured provost Gijsbrecht van Brederode as bishop. But Philip the Good used force to make David's appointment be accepted.

Nevertheless, opposition against his rule remained, and David of Burgundy even found it safer to leave the city of Utrecht and take up residence in Wijk bij Duurstede. The van Brederode family was at the center of the opposition.

In 1470, David of Burgundy imprisoned Gijsbrecht van Brederode and his brother Reinoud II van Brederode, and had them tortured. This action stirred up the century-old animosity between the Hooks who supported the family van Brederode and the Cods who supported Burgundy. A new war broke out that lasted until 1474.

The status quo returned, until the Utrecht war of 1481–83 broke out.

== See also ==
- History of Utrecht
- Hook and Cod wars
