= Siege of Utrecht (1483) =

Battle of the Hook and Cod Wars

Coordinates: 52°05′20″N 5°06′56″E

The siege of Utrecht took place between June 23 and August 31, 1483 as part of the Hook and Cod wars and the Second Utrecht Civil War.

== Prelude ==
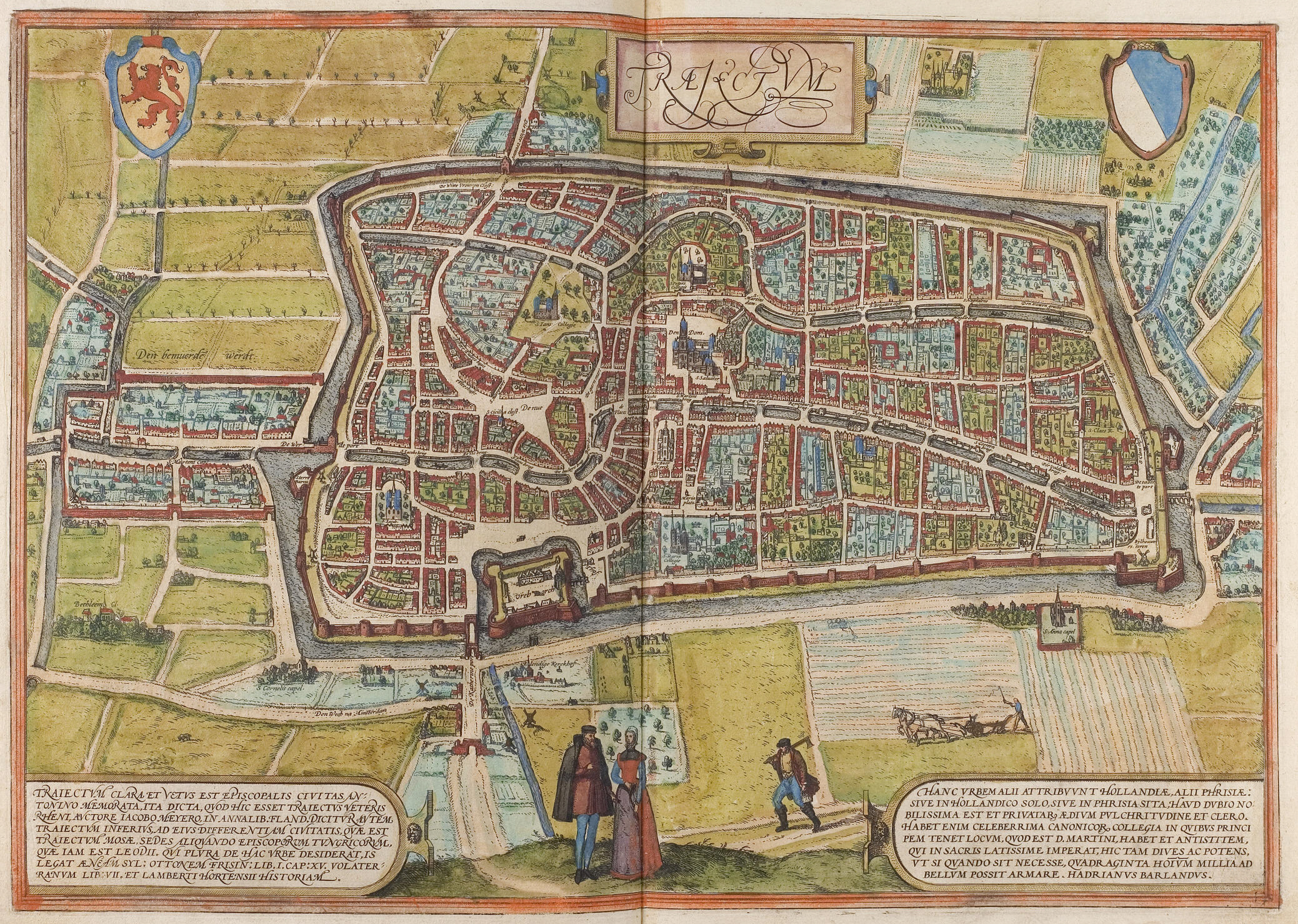
16th-century map of Utrecht

The Burgundians had tried to control the Bishopric of Utrecht since 1456, when David of Burgundy had become the new Prince-Bishop. Supported by the Cods and opposed by the Hooks, this conflict was linked to the century-old Hook and Cod wars. When Charles the Bold unexpectedly died in 1477, opposition to David of Burgundy flared up again, culminating in the Second Utrecht Civil War (1481–1483).
David of Burgundy had to flee Utrecht and seek support from the new ruler of Burgundy, Maximilian of Austria.

Only back in control of the city of Utrecht since April 21, 1483, Prince-Bishop David of Burgundy was surprised in his old episcopal palace by a daring and stealthy night raid of the Hooks on May 8. The Prince-Bishop was captured and then imprisoned in Amersfoort. When Maximilian of Austria heard this news, he formed a large army under Joost de Lalaing to besiege Utrecht.

== Siege ==
The Archduke Maximilian set camp before the walls of Utrecht on June 23 and laid siege to the city. His troops' bombardment of the city walls seriously undermined the city's defences and the Hooks quickly requested a truce. Viscount Jan of Montfoort, Engelbert of Cleves and Gerrit Zoudenbalch then left the city to negotiate terms with the Archduke. The Viscount was not prepared to accept Maximilian's terms without further consultations with his allies so Engelbert of Cleves and Gerrit Zoudenbalch remained behind as hostages whilst Viscount Jan returned to the city. Shortly thereafter the inconsidered action of a party of Maximilian's troops broke the truce and in reaction Jan of Montfoort's Hook militants re-commenced hostilities with their besiegers. As a result, both Engelbert of Cleves and Gerrit Zoudenbalch were now considered to be prisoners of war.

The resumption of hostilities led to a hand-to-hand struggle for Utrecht which became uglier by the day with both sides suffering severe losses. With the chief Hook personalities dispersed, discouraged or in captivity, the peace party in Utrecht once again gained the upper hand over the viscerally anti-Burgundian Viscount Jan. Maximilian, who had seen his stadtholder, Joost de Lalaing, and many of his men fall as casualties in the course of the siege, was now also inclined to peace. His conditions for capitulation were hard but not harsh and were readily accepted by the war-torn city.

== Aftermath ==
Having taken control of Utrecht the Archduke continued on to Amersfoort, where he liberated David of Burgundy. For financial, political and economic reasons it was in the interest of both Maximilian and David of Burgundy to effect a lasting reconciliation with their adversaries, and their moderate post-war policies reflected this need.

== See also ==
- History of Utrecht
