= David of Burgundy =

Bishop of Utrecht from 1457 to 1494

The Most Reverend David of Burgundy
- Bishop of Utrecht
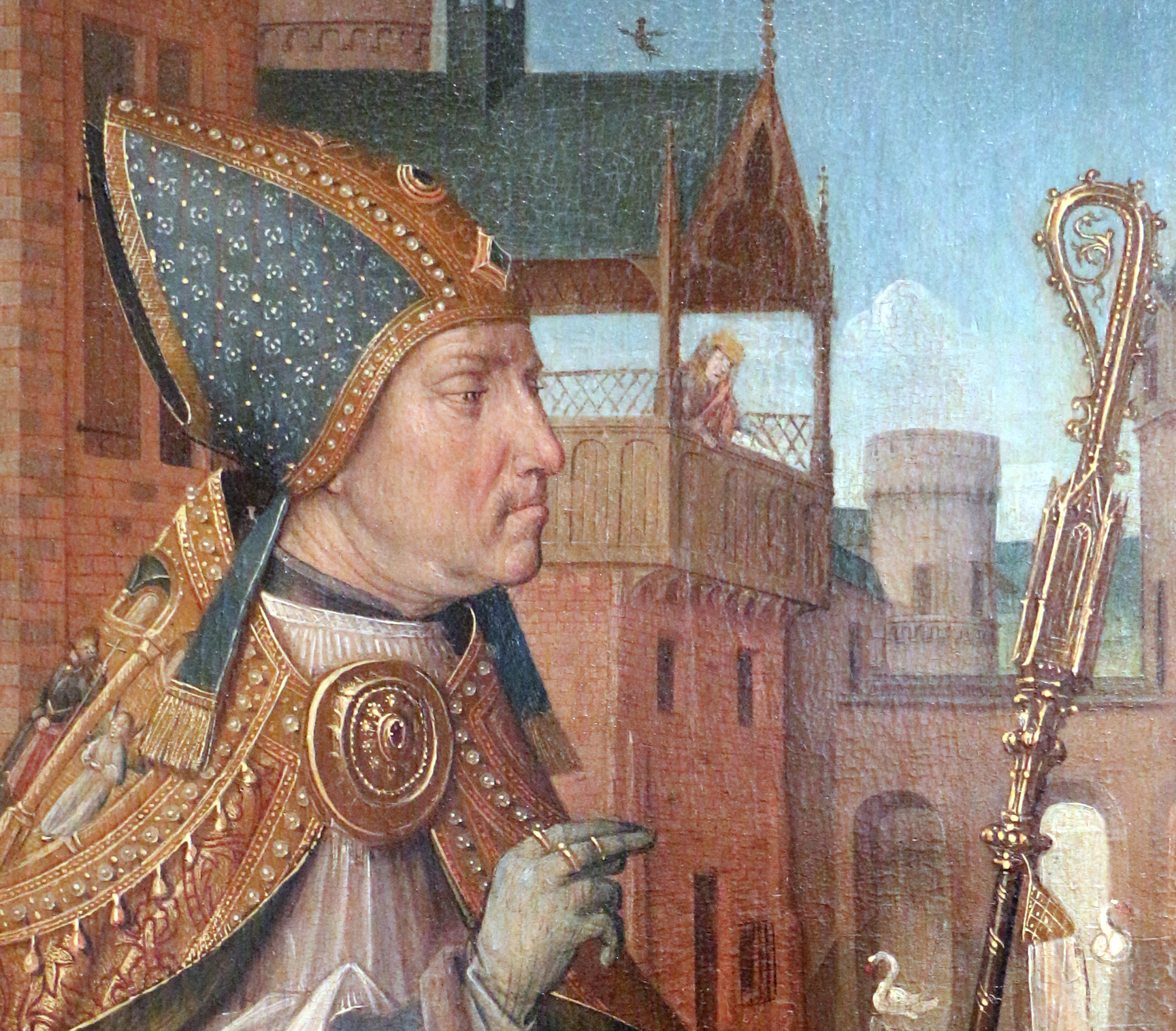
- As Saint Martin, in a painting by the Master of Delft
- Church: Roman Catholic
- Diocese: Utrecht
- Appointed: 12 September 1457
- Term ended: 16 April 1494
- Predecessor: Gijsbrecht van Brederode
- Successor: Frederick IV of Baden

Orders
- Consecration: 13 September 1451

Personal details
- Born: c. February 1426 Arras
- Died: 16 April 1494 (aged 68) Wijk bij Duurstede

David of Burgundy (c. February 1426 – 16 April 1494) was the bishop of Utrecht from 1456. The illegitimate son of Philip the Good, Duke of Burgundy, David was made bishop by his father in an attempt to enforce more centralised Burgundian control over the Netherlands (as Bishop he was Sovereign of the Prince-Bishopric of Utrecht). He also served as bishop of Thérouanne from 1451 to 1456. He is the third longest-reigning bishop of Utrecht after Balderic and Willibrord, holding the see until his death in 1494.

== Biography ==
David of Burgundy was bishop of Thérouanne (Terwaan) from 1451. Thanks to a joint effort between the Cods and Burgundy, he was appointed as bishop of Utrecht by the pope. The Utrecht chapters, however, had elected the Hook-favoured provost Gijsbrecht van Brederode as bishop. But Philip the Good forced the Nedersticht to accept David's appointment on 3 August 1456 at the treaty of IJsselstein. The Oversticht had to be forcefully convinced as well. Deventer was besieged for five weeks before it surrendered.

The opposition against him remained and therefore David left Utrecht in 1459 to settle in the newly acquired Wijk bij Duurstede, where he resided for the rest of his life. Thanks to Burgundian support and clever politics, his authority rose. Another effective measure was the creation of the Schive, a central court of appeal that was above city law.

A breakthrough meant the capture of Gijsbrecht van Brederode and his brother Reinoud in 1470. This led to the First Utrecht Civil War (1470–74), won by David.

Because of the Burgundian power of that time, David of Burgundy was one of the most powerful bishops in Europe. He appointed the schout, wrested criminal jurisdiction from the council, controlled the tolls and lessened the influence of the city on the farmlands.

The death of his half-brother Charles the Bold in 1477 changed everything. David's politics led to a revolt of supporters of the Hook party in 1481. A new civil war erupted and David was captured. Maximilian I, Holy Roman Emperor had to intervene to free the bishop. David then reconquered Utrecht in the Battle of Westbroek, only to be driven out again in 1483. After the successful Siege of Utrecht, the revolt came to an end in 1483.

David of Burgundy was an art lover; he attracted artists to his court and gave a powerful impulse to the construction of the Dom Church in Utrecht. He modernised his residence, the Duurstede Castle at Wijk bij Duurstede, and he is also responsible for the large church there. The Museum Catharijneconvent holds a beautiful Cope of David of Burgundy.

David's last years were focussed on restoring the financial situation that had been ruined by the civil war of 1481–83, and balancing the influence of the Habsburgs, who had by then come to possess Holland, and Guelders.

David died in 1494 and was buried in the church of Wijk bij Duurstede.

== Gallery ==
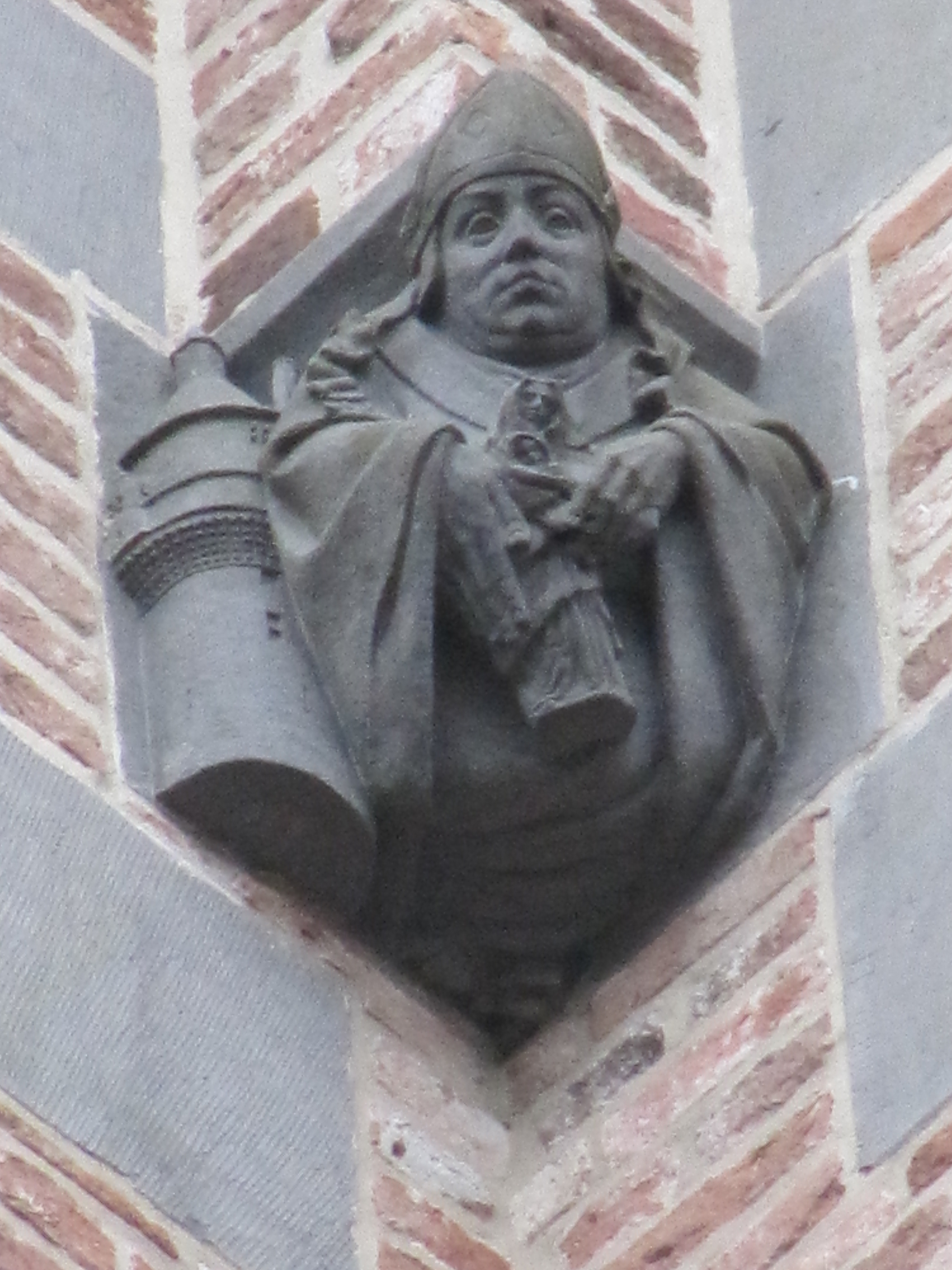
Console, Onze Lieve Vrouwetoren in Amersfoort

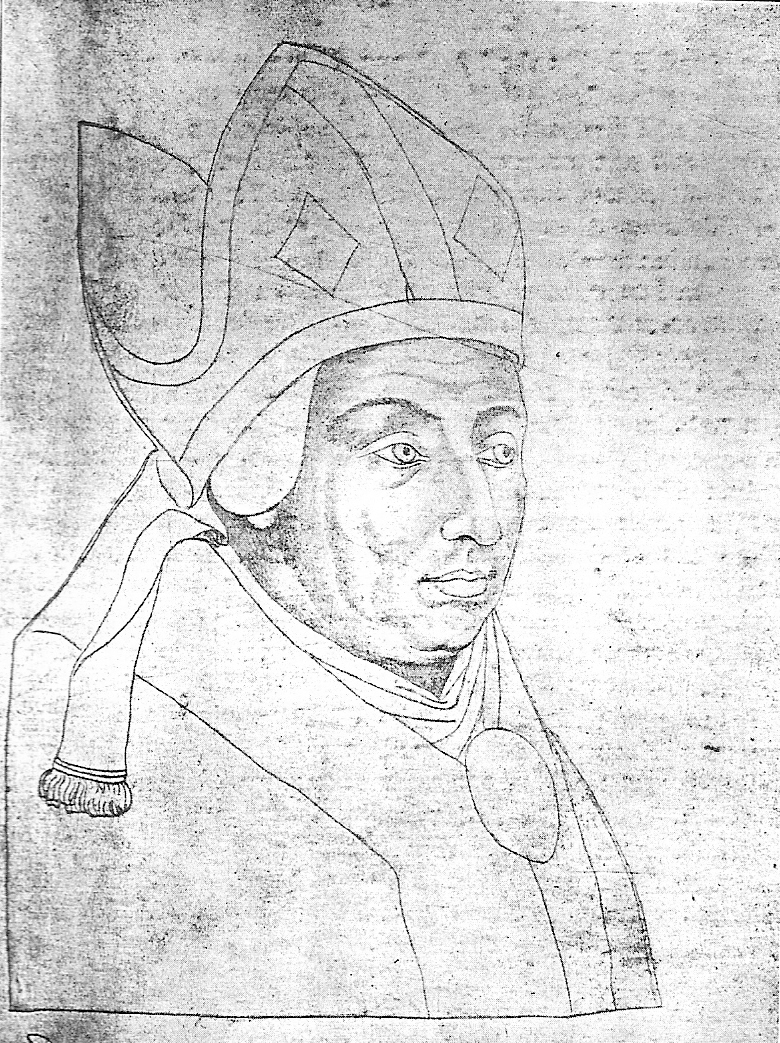
Drawing

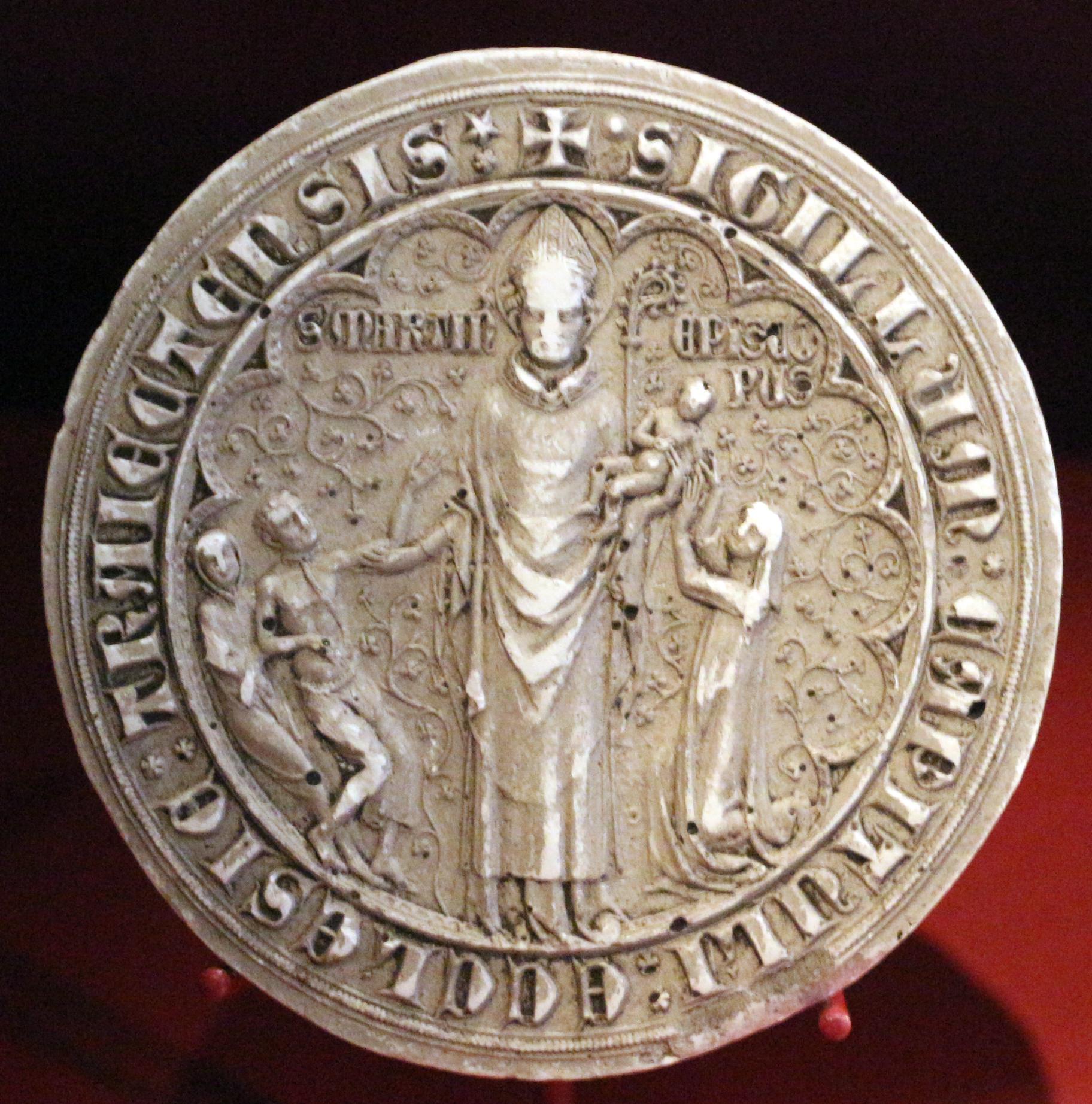
On one of his coins

== Bibliography ==
- P.J. Blok; P.C. Molhuysen (1937). Nieuw Nederlandsch biografisch woordenboek. Deel 10 (in Dutch). p. 105.
- Hierarchia Catholica. Vol. 2. pp. 196, 253.
- Les Ordinations Épiscopales. 1451.
- Le Petit Episcopologe, issue 78.

Preceded by Gijsbrecht van Brederode	Bishop of Utrecht; 1457–1494	Succeeded by Frederick IV of Baden
