= Gijsbrecht van Brederode =

Bishop of Utrecht (1416–1475)

- Bishop of Utrecht
- Church: Catholic Church
- Diocese: Utrecht
- Elected: 7 April 1455
- Term ended: 6 August 1456

Personal details
- Born: 1416
- Died: 15 August 1475 (aged 58–59)
- Coat of arms

Gijsbrecht van Brederode (1416 – 15 August 1475) was a Dutch nobleman who served as Bishop-elect of Utrecht from his election on 7 April 1455 until his resignation on 6 August 1456.

Gijsbrecht van Brederode was a son of Walraven I van Brederode and the brother of Reinoud II van Brederode. He was provost in Utrecht and as leader of the Hook faction, led the resistance against Rudolf van Diepholt. On 7 April 1455 he was elected bishop by the chapters, but Philip the Good put pressure on pope Calixtus III to appoint Philip's bastard son; David of Burgundy. Philip violently quelled the resistance against this appointment and besieged Deventer. In 1456 Gijsbrecht agreed to retract his claim to the bishopric in return for a large financial compensation. He remained, however, a thorn in the side of David, who imprisoned him together with his brother Reinoud in 1470.

Catholic Church titles
Preceded by Rudolf van Diepholt	Utrecht; 1455-1456	Succeeded by David of Burgundy
