= Joost de Lalaing =

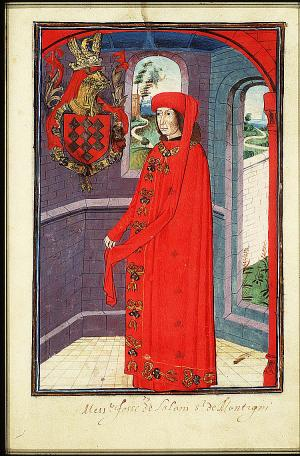
- Joost de Lalaing as member of the Order of the Golden Fleece
- Died: 5 August 1483
- Noble family: House of Lalaing
- Spouse: Bonne de Viefville
- Father: Simon de Lalaing
- Mother: Jeanne de Gavre

Joost de Lalaing (c. 1437 – 5 August 1483 near Utrecht), lord of Montigny and of Santes, was a noble from Hainaut who filled several important posts in service of the Burgundian Dukes.

== Life ==
Joost de Lalaing was the eldest son of Simon de Lalaing. In 1468 Charles the Bold appointed him souvereign-bailiff for the County of Flanders.

In 1463 he became Admiral of Flanders. In 1476 he was a member of the Duchal Council of Charles the Bold. From 1477 on he was chamberlain at the court of Charles' daughter, Mary of Burgundy. In 1478 he was made a Knight of the Order of the Golden Fleece. When Wolfert VI of Borselen could no longer control the situation in the Holland and Zeeland, Joost was appointed stadtholder of these regions. He remained stadtholder until his death in 1483. Joost de Lalaing died at the siege of Utrecht, during the Hook and Cod wars.

== Marriage and descendants ==
Joost de Lalaing married Bonne de Viefville in 1462. They had four children:

- Charles (1466–1525), 1st count of Lalaing
- Antoine (1480–1540), lord of Montigny and 1st count of Hoogstraten and Culemborg
- Antonia (?-1540), married Philip, lord of Habart
- Margareta, married Philip le Josne, and Louis, lord of Longueval

== Sources ==
Lalaing coat of arms

- Hans Cools, Mannen met macht, Edellieden en de Moderne Staat in de Bourgondisch-Habsburgse landen (1475–1530). Walburg Pers, Zutphen, 2001. ISBN 90-6011-625-9
