= List of United Kingdom locations: Ge-Gl =

The United Kingdom

This is part of the list of United Kingdom locations: a gazetteer of place names in the United Kingdom showing each place's locality and geographical coordinates.

== Ge ==
Location	Locality	Coordinates (links to map & photo sources)	OS grid reference
Gearraidh Bhailteas	Western Isles	57.20°N 07.41°W	NF7326
Gearraidh Bhaird	Western Isles	58.09°N 06.48°W	NB3620
Gearraidh na h-Aibhne / Garynahine	Western Isles	58.18°N 06.71°W	NB2331
Geary	Highland	57.55°N 06.58°W	NG2661
Gearymore	Highland	57.37°N 06.47°W	NG3140
Gedding	Suffolk	52.17°N 00.83°E	TL9457
Geddington	Northamptonshire	52.43°N 00.69°W	SP8983
Gedgrave Hall	Suffolk	52.07°N 01.50°E	TM4048
Gedintailor	Highland	57.33°N 06.12°W	NG5235
Gedling	Nottinghamshire	52.97°N 01.09°W	SK6142
Gedney	Lincolnshire	52.79°N 00.07°E	TF4024
Gedney Drove End	Lincolnshire	52.83°N 00.16°E	TF4629
Gedney Dyke	Lincolnshire	52.81°N 00.09°E	TF4126
Gedney Hill	Lincolnshire	52.68°N 00.03°W	TF3311
Gee Cross	Tameside	53.43°N 02.07°W	SJ9593
Geeston	Rutland	52.62°N 00.55°W	SK9804
Gegin	Wrexham	53.06°N 03.09°W	SJ2752
Geilston	Argyll and Bute	55.95°N 04.66°W	NS3477
Geinas	Denbighshire	53.21°N 03.36°W	SJ0969
Geirinis / Gerinish	Western Isles	57.34°N 07.37°W	NF7741
Geldeston	Norfolk	52.46°N 01.51°E	TM3991
Gell	Conwy	53.20°N 03.73°W	SH8469
Gelli	Pembrokeshire	51.842°N 04.785°W	SN082196
Gelli	Rhondda, Cynon, Taff	51.63°N 03.48°W	SS9794
Gellideg	Merthyr Tydfil	51.75°N 03.42°W	SO0207
Gellifor	Denbighshire	53.14°N 03.31°W	SJ1262
Gelligaer	Caerphilly	51.65°N 03.25°W	ST1396
Gelli-gaer	Neath Port Talbot	51.63°N 03.79°W	SS7694
Gelligroes	Caerphilly	51.63°N 03.20°W	ST1794
Gelli-haf	Caerphilly	51.64°N 03.21°W	ST1695
Gellilydan	Gwynedd	52.93°N 03.96°W	SH6839
Gellinudd	Neath Port Talbot	51.72°N 03.84°W	SN7304
Gellygron	Neath Port Talbot	51.72°N 03.86°W	SN7104
Gellywen	Carmarthenshire	51.87°N 04.51°W	SN2723
Gelsmoor	Leicestershire	52.75°N 01.40°W	SK4018
Gelston	Dumfries and Galloway	54.90°N 03.93°W	NX7658
Gelston	Lincolnshire	52.99°N 00.64°W	SK9145
Gembling	East Riding of Yorkshire	53.99°N 00.32°W	TA1057
Gemini	Cheshire	53.41°N 02.63°W	SJ5891
Gendros	Swansea	51.63°N 03.98°W	SS6395
Genesis Green	Suffolk	52.18°N 00.54°E	TL7457
Gentleshaw	Staffordshire	52.69°N 01.92°W	SK0511
Geocrab	Western Isles	57.80°N 06.86°W	NG1190
George Green	Buckinghamshire	51.51°N 00.55°W	TQ0081
Georgeham	Devon	51.12°N 04.20°W	SS4639
George Nympton	Devon	50.99°N 03.85°W	SS7023
Georgetown	Blaenau Gwent	51.76°N 03.24°W	SO1408
Georgetown	Dumfries and Galloway	55.05°N 03.58°W	NX9975
Georgia	Cornwall	50.17°N 05.53°W	SW4836
Gerdinen isaf	Swansea	51.73°N 03.98°W	SN6306
Gergask	Highland	57.01°N 04.29°W	NN6194
Gerlan	Gwynedd	53.17°N 04.05°W	SH6366
Germansweek	Devon	50.72°N 04.22°W	SX4394
Germiston	City of Glasgow	55.86°N 04.22°W	NS6166
Germoe	Cornwall	50.11°N 05.38°W	SW5829
Gernon Bushes	Essex	51.69°N 00.12°E	TL4702
Gerrans	Cornwall	50.17°N 04.98°W	SW8735
Gerrard's Bromley	Staffordshire	52.90°N 02.32°W	SJ7834
Gerrards Cross	Buckinghamshire	51.57°N 00.57°W	SU9987
Gerrick	Redcar and Cleveland	54.49°N 00.92°W	NZ7012
Geseilfa	Powys	52.50°N 03.56°W	SN9491
Geshader	Western Isles	58.17°N 06.91°W	NB1131
Gestingthorpe	Essex	52.01°N 00.63°E	TL8138
Geuffordd	Powys	52.71°N 03.17°W	SJ2114
Geufron	Denbighshire	52.96°N 03.17°W	SJ2142

== Gi ==
Location	Locality	Coordinates (links to map & photo sources)	OS grid reference
Gibbet Hill (near Kenilworth)	Coventry	52.36°N 01.56°W	SP3074
Gibbet Hill (near Rugby)	Warwickshire	52.41°N 01.23°W	SP5280
Gibb Hill	Cheshire	53.29°N 02.54°W	SJ6478
Gib Heath	Birmingham	52.49°N 01.92°W	SP0588
Gibraltar	Kent	51.10°N 01.14°E	TR2039
Gibraltar	Bedfordshire	52.10°N 00.54°W	TL0046
Gibraltar	Buckinghamshire	51.78°N 00.91°W	SP7510
Gibraltar	Oxfordshire	51.84°N 01.30°W	SP4817
Gibshill	Inverclyde	55.92°N 04.72°W	NS3074
Gibsmere	Nottinghamshire	53.02°N 00.94°W	SK7148
Giddeahall	Wiltshire	51.46°N 02.21°W	ST8574
Giddy Green	Dorset	50.67°N 02.24°W	SY8386
Gidea Park	Havering	51.58°N 00.19°E	TQ5290
Gidleigh	Devon	50.67°N 03.88°W	SX6788
Giffard Park	Milton Keynes	52.06°N 00.74°W	SP8642
Giffnock	East Renfrewshire	55.79°N 04.29°W	NS5658
Gifford	East Lothian	55.89°N 02.75°W	NT5367
Giffordtown	Fife	56.28°N 03.14°W	NO2911
Gigalum Island	Argyll and Bute	55.64°N 05.74°W	NR645456
Gigg	Bury	53.57°N 02.28°W	SD8109
Giggetty	Staffordshire	52.52°N 02.20°W	SO8692
Giggleswick	North Yorkshire	54.07°N 02.29°W	SD8164
Giggshill	Surrey	51.38°N 00.33°W	TQ1666
Gigha Island	Argyll and Bute	55.67°N 05.75°W	NR642492
Gighay	Western Isles	57.02°N 07.32°W	NF768049
Gignog	Pembrokeshire	51.87°N 05.08°W	SM8824
Gilberdyke	East Riding of Yorkshire	53.75°N 00.74°W	SE8329
Gilbert's Coombe	Cornwall	50.24°N 05.24°W	SW6943
Gilbert's End	Worcestershire	52.07°N 02.26°W	SO8242
Gilbert's Green	Warwickshire	52.33°N 01.85°W	SP1071
Gilbertstone	Birmingham	52.45°N 01.81°W	SP1384
Gilbert Street	Hampshire	51.08°N 01.07°W	SU6532
Gilchriston	East Lothian	55.87°N 02.84°W	NT4765
Gilcrux	Cumbria	54.72°N 03.38°W	NY1138
Gildersome	Leeds	53.75°N 01.63°W	SE2429
Gildersome Street	Leeds	53.74°N 01.63°W	SE2428
Gildingwells	Rotherham	53.35°N 01.17°W	SK5585
Gilesgate	Durham	54.78°N 01.56°W	NZ2843
Gilesgate Moor	Durham	54.77°N 01.55°W	NZ2942
Gileston	The Vale Of Glamorgan	51.39°N 03.42°W	ST0167
Gilfach	Caerphilly	51.67°N 03.23°W	ST1598
Gilfach	Herefordshire	52.00°N 02.96°W	SO3434
Gilfach Goch	Rhondda, Cynon, Taff	51.59°N 03.47°W	SS9889
Gilfachreda	Ceredigion	52.19°N 04.34°W	SN4058
Gilgarran	Cumbria	54.59°N 03.50°W	NY0323
Gill	North Yorkshire	53.88°N 02.06°W	SD9643
Gillamoor	North Yorkshire	54.29°N 00.95°W	SE6889
Gillan	Cornwall	50.07°N 05.10°W	SW7824
Gillarona	Shetland Islands	60.34°N 01.42°W	HU3262
Gillbank	Cumbria	54.37°N 02.98°W	SD3698
Gillbent	Cheshire	53.35°N 02.21°W	SJ8684
Gillen	Highland	57.53°N 06.58°W	NG2659
Gillesbie	Dumfries and Galloway	55.20°N 03.32°W	NY1691
Gilling East	North Yorkshire	54.17°N 01.06°W	SE6176
Gillingham	Dorset	51.03°N 02.28°W	ST8026
Gillingham	Norfolk	52.46°N 01.54°E	TM4191
Gillingham	Kent	51.37°N 00.54°E	TQ7767
Gilling West	North Yorkshire	54.44°N 01.72°W	NZ1805
Gillmoss	Liverpool	53.45°N 02.90°W	SJ4096
Gillow Heath	Staffordshire	53.11°N 02.18°W	SJ8858
Gills	Highland	58.63°N 03.17°W	ND3272
Gill's Green	Kent	51.06°N 00.49°E	TQ7532
Gillway	Staffordshire	52.63°N 01.70°W	SK2004
Gilmanscleuch	Scottish Borders	55.47°N 03.06°W	NT3321
Gilmerton	City of Edinburgh	55.90°N 03.13°W	NT2968
Gilmerton	Perth and Kinross	56.38°N 03.81°W	NN8823
Gilmonby	Durham	54.50°N 02.01°W	NY9912
Gilmorton	Leicestershire	52.47°N 01.16°W	SP5787
Gilmourton	South Lanarkshire	55.63°N 04.14°W	NS6540
Gilnow	Bolton	53.56°N 02.45°W	SD7008
Gilroyd	Barnsley	53.53°N 01.50°W	SE3304
Gilsay	Western Isles	57.70°N 07.01°W	NG017796
Gilsland	Cumbria	54.98°N 02.57°W	NY6366
Gilson	Warwickshire	52.50°N 01.73°W	SP1890
Gilstead	Bradford	53.84°N 01.81°W	SE1239
Gilston	Hertfordshire	51.78°N 00.08°E	TL4412
Gilston	Scottish Borders	55.79°N 02.89°W	NT4456
Gilston Park	Hertfordshire	51.79°N 00.08°E	TL4413
Giltbrook	Nottinghamshire	53.00°N 01.28°W	SK4845
Gilver's Lane	Worcestershire	52.06°N 02.27°W	SO8141
Gilwell Park	Essex	51.64°N 00.01°W	TQ3896
Gilwern	Monmouthshire	51.81°N 03.10°W	SO2414
Gimingham	Norfolk	52.87°N 01.38°E	TG2836
Ginclough	Cheshire	53.28°N 02.07°W	SJ9576
Ginger's Green	East Sussex	50.88°N 00.30°E	TQ6212
Giosla	Western Isles	58.12°N 06.89°W	NB1225
Gipping	Suffolk	52.22°N 01.02°E	TM0763
Gipsey Bridge	Lincolnshire	53.02°N 00.09°W	TF2849
Gipsy Row	Suffolk	52.00°N 01.01°E	TM0738
Gipsyville	City of Kingston upon Hull	53.72°N 00.39°W	TA0627
Gipton	Leeds	53.81°N 01.50°W	SE3335
Gipton Wood	Leeds	53.81°N 01.51°W	SE3236
Girdle Ness	City of Aberdeen	57.13°N 02.06°W	NJ960048
Girdle Toll	North Ayrshire	55.62°N 04.63°W	NS3440
Girlington	Bradford	53.80°N 01.78°W	SE1434
Girlsta	Shetland Islands	60.23°N 01.24°W	HU4250
Girsby	Darlington	54.46°N 01.46°W	NZ3508
Girsby	Lincolnshire	53.36°N 00.18°W	TF2187
Girt	Somerset	51.00°N 02.54°W	ST6223
Girthon	Dumfries and Galloway	54.85°N 04.18°W	NX6053
Girton	Cambridgeshire	52.23°N 00.07°E	TL4262
Girton	Nottinghamshire	53.18°N 00.77°W	SK8266
Gisburn	Lancashire	53.92°N 02.27°W	SD8248
Gisleham	Suffolk	52.43°N 01.69°E	TM5188
Gislingham	Suffolk	52.29°N 01.03°E	TM0771
Gissing	Norfolk	52.42°N 01.14°E	TM1485
Gittisham	Devon	50.77°N 03.23°W	SY1398
Givendale	North Yorkshire	54.11°N 01.47°W	SE3393
Givons Grove	Surrey	51.27°N 00.32°W	TQ1754

== Gl ==
=== Gla ===
Location	Locality	Coordinates (links to map & photo sources)	OS grid reference
Glackmore	Highland	57.52°N 04.33°W	NH6051
Gladestry	Powys	52.18°N 03.12°W	SO2355
Gladsmuir	East Lothian	55.94°N 02.88°W	NT4573
Glaichbea	Highland	57.41°N 04.48°W	NH5139
Glaick	Highland	57.28°N 05.66°W	NG7927
Glais	Swansea	51.68°N 03.88°W	SN7000
Glaisdale	North Yorkshire	54.43°N 00.81°W	NZ7705
Glamis	Angus	56.60°N 03.01°W	NO3846
Glan Adda	Gwynedd	53.20°N 04.14°W	SH5770
Glanafon	Pembrokeshire	51.81°N 04.97°W	SM9517
Glanaman	Carmarthenshire	51.80°N 03.93°W	SN6713
Glandford	Norfolk	52.92°N 01.03°E	TG0441
Glandwr	Pembrokeshire	51.92°N 04.63°W	SN1928
Glandwr	Caerphilly	51.70°N 03.15°W	SO2001
Glan Dwyfach	Gwynedd	52.96°N 04.26°W	SH4843
Glandy Cross	Carmarthenshire	51.90°N 04.70°W	SN1426
Glandyfi	Ceredigion	52.54°N 03.93°W	SN6996
Glangrwyney	Powys	51.83°N 03.10°W	SO2416
Glanhanog	Powys	52.57°N 03.56°W	SN9499
Glanmule	Powys	52.50°N 03.23°W	SO1690
Glanmwrwg	Carmarthenshire	51.68°N 04.09°W	SN5501
Glanrhyd	Pembrokeshire	52.04°N 04.71°W	SN1442
Glan-rhyd	Neath Port Talbot	51.76°N 03.78°W	SN7709
Glantlees	Northumberland	55.33°N 01.78°W	NU1405
Glanton	Northumberland	55.42°N 01.89°W	NU0714
Glanvilles Wootton	Dorset	50.87°N 02.47°W	ST6708
Glanwern	Ceredigion	52.47°N 04.04°W	SN6188
Glanwydden	Conwy	53.30°N 03.78°W	SH8180
Glan-y-don	Flintshire	53.30°N 03.26°W	SJ1679
Glan-y-llyn	Cardiff	51.54°N 03.28°W	ST1184
Glanymor	Carmarthenshire	51.77°N 04.46°W	SN3011
Glanyrafon or Glanrafon	Ceredigion	52.40°N 04.04°W	SN6180
Glan-y-nant	Powys	52.44°N 03.57°W	SN9384
Glan-y-nant	Caerphilly	51.66°N 03.24°W	ST1497
Glan-yr-afon	Isle of Anglesey	53.29°N 04.10°W	SH6080
Glan-yr-afon	Flintshire	53.31°N 03.33°W	SJ1181
Glan-yr-afon	Gwynedd	52.96°N 03.46°W	SJ0242
Glan-yr-afon	Shropshire	52.80°N 03.15°W	SJ2224
Glan-y-wern	Gwynedd	52.88°N 04.08°W	SH6034
Glapthorn	Northamptonshire	52.49°N 00.49°W	TL0290
Glapwell	Derbyshire	53.18°N 01.29°W	SK4766
Glasbury	Powys	52.04°N 03.21°W	SO1739
Glascoed	Powys	52.48°N 03.35°W	SO0888
Glascoed	Carmarthenshire	51.84°N 04.16°W	SN5119
Glascoed	Monmouthshire	51.70°N 02.97°W	SO3301
Glascoed	Denbighshire	53.24°N 03.51°W	SH9973
Glascoed	Wrexham	53.07°N 03.09°W	SJ2754
Glascote	Staffordshire	52.61°N 01.67°W	SK2202
Glascwm	Powys	52.16°N 03.24°W	SO1553
Glasdir	Flintshire	53.32°N 03.32°W	SJ1282
Glas Eilean	Highland	57.26°N 05.56°W	NG849252
Glasfryn	Conwy	53.03°N 03.62°W	SH9150
Glasgoed	Ceredigion	52.11°N 04.44°W	SN3349
Glasgow	City of Glasgow	55.85°N 04.25°W	NS5965
Glashvin / Glasphein	Highland	57.63°N 06.24°W	NG4768
Glasinfryn	Gwynedd	53.19°N 04.12°W	SH5868
Glasllwch	City of Newport	51.57°N 03.04°W	ST2887
Glasnacardoch	Highland	56.98°N 05.83°W	NM6795
Glasnakille	Highland	57.14°N 06.08°W	NG5313
Glasphein	Highland	57.45°N 06.70°W	NG1850
Glaspwll	Ceredigion	52.55°N 03.87°W	SN7397
Glassenbury	Kent	51.09°N 00.48°E	TQ7436
Glassford	South Lanarkshire	55.70°N 04.03°W	NS7247
Glass Houghton	Wakefield	53.71°N 01.33°W	SE4424
Glasshouse	Gloucestershire	51.88°N 02.43°W	SO7021
Glasshouses	North Yorkshire	54.07°N 01.74°W	SE1764
Glasson (Bowness)	Cumbria	54.92°N 03.17°W	NY2560
Glasson (Maryport)	Cumbria	54.71°N 03.50°W	NY0336
Glasson	Lancashire	53.99°N 02.85°W	SD4456
Glassonby	Cumbria	54.73°N 02.66°W	NY5738
Glaston	Rutland	52.59°N 00.68°W	SK8900
Glastonbury	Somerset	51.14°N 02.71°W	ST5039
Glatton	Cambridgeshire	52.46°N 00.30°W	TL1586
Glazebrook	Cheshire	53.42°N 02.46°W	SJ6992
Glazebury	Cheshire	53.46°N 02.49°W	SJ6797
Glazeley	Shropshire	52.49°N 02.44°W	SO7088

=== Gle ===
Location	Locality	Coordinates (links to map & photo sources)	OS grid reference
Gleadless	Sheffield	53.34°N 01.43°W	SK3883
Gleadless Valley	Sheffield	53.34°N 01.44°W	SK3783
Gleadmoss	Cheshire	53.20°N 02.27°W	SJ8268
Gleaston	Cumbria	54.12°N 03.14°W	SD2570
Glebe	Hampshire	50.93°N 01.21°W	SU5515
Glebe	Shetland Islands	60.14°N 01.11°W	HU4940
Glebe	Sunderland	54.89°N 01.53°W	NZ3056
Gledhow	Leeds	53.81°N 01.53°W	SE3136
Gledrid	Shropshire	52.91°N 03.05°W	SJ2936
Gleiniant	Powys	52.50°N 03.51°W	SN9791
Glemsford	Suffolk	52.10°N 00.65°E	TL8248
Glenacardoch Point	Argyll and Bute	55.57°N 05.70°W	NR665377
Glenancross	Highland	56.95°N 05.85°W	NM6691
Glenbarr	Argyll and Bute	55.56°N 05.71°W	NR6636
Glenbarry	Moray	57.57°N 02.75°W	NJ5554
Glenbernisdale	Highland	57.44°N 06.33°W	NG4048
Glenbervie	Aberdeenshire	56.91°N 02.39°W	NO7680
Glenboig	North Lanarkshire	55.88°N 04.04°W	NS7268
Glenborrodale	Highland	56.68°N 05.90°W	NM6161
Glen Branter	Argyll and Bute	56.11°N 05.07°W	NS0996
Glenbranter	Argyll and Bute	56.12°N 05.04°W	NS1197
Glenbreck	Scottish Borders	55.47°N 03.50°W	NT0521
Glenbrook	City of Edinburgh	55.87°N 03.37°W	NT1465
Glenbuck	East Ayrshire	55.53°N 03.99°W	NS7429
Glenburn	Renfrewshire	55.81°N 04.44°W	NS4761
Glencaple	Dumfries and Galloway	54.99°N 03.58°W	NX9968
Glencarse	Perth and Kinross	56.37°N 03.31°W	NO1921
Glenchass	Isle of Man	54.06°N 04.76°W	SC1967
Glencoe	Highland	56.67°N 05.10°W	NN1058
Glencraig	Fife	56.13°N 03.32°W	NT1894
Glendale	Highland	57.44°N 06.71°W	NG1749
Glendearg	Scottish Borders	55.63°N 02.77°W	NT5138
Glendevon	Perth and Kinross	56.21°N 03.63°W	NN9904
Glendoick	Perth and Kinross	56.38°N 03.29°W	NO2022
Glenduckie	Fife	56.34°N 03.16°W	NO2818
Glenegedale	Argyll and Bute	55.67°N 06.24°W	NR3351
Glenelg	Highland	57.20°N 05.62°W	NG8119
Glenfarg	Perth and Kinross	56.27°N 03.40°W	NO1310
Glenfield	City of Leicester	52.64°N 01.20°W	SK5405
Glenfinnan	Highland	56.86°N 05.46°W	NM8980
Glenfoot	Perth and Kinross	56.32°N 03.32°W	NO1815
Glengarnock	North Ayrshire	55.74°N 04.67°W	NS3253
Glengrasco	Highland	57.41°N 06.26°W	NG4444
Glen Heysdal	Highland	57.40°N 06.49°W	NG3044
Glenholt	Devon	50.42°N 04.11°W	SX5060
Glenhurich	Highland	56.75°N 05.55°W	NM8368
Glenkindie	Aberdeenshire	57.20°N 02.94°W	NJ4313
Glenleigh Park	East Sussex	50.84°N 00.45°E	TQ7308
Glenlivet	Moray	57.34°N 03.34°W	NJ1929
Glenlochar	Dumfries and Galloway	54.95°N 03.98°W	NX7364
Glenlomond	Perth and Kinross	56.22°N 03.35°W	NO1604
Glenluce	Dumfries and Galloway	54.87°N 04.82°W	NX1957
Glenmarkie Lodge	Angus	56.76°N 03.26°W	NO2364
Glenmavis	West Lothian	55.90°N 03.63°W	NS9869
Glenmavis	North Lanarkshire	55.88°N 03.99°W	NS7567
Glen Maye	Isle of Man	54.17°N 04.71°W	SC2379
Glenmayne	Scottish Borders	55.58°N 02.81°W	NT4933
Glen Mona	Isle of Man	54.26°N 04.38°W	SC4588
Glenmore	Highland	57.37°N 06.27°W	NG4340
Glen of Newmill	Moray	57.57°N 02.93°W	NJ4454
Glenogil	Angus	56.75°N 02.91°W	NO4463
Glenowen	Pembrokeshire	51.70°N 04.96°W	SM9505
Glen Parva	Leicestershire	52.58°N 01.17°W	SP5699
Glenprosen Village	Angus	56.77°N 03.11°W	NO3265
Glenrath	Scottish Borders	55.58°N 03.27°W	NT2033
Glenridding	Cumbria	54.54°N 02.96°W	NY3817
Glenrothes	Fife	56.19°N 03.17°W	NO2701
Glensanda	Highland	56.55°N 05.54°W	NM8246
Glensburgh	Falkirk	56.01°N 03.75°W	NS9182
Glenstockadale	Dumfries and Galloway	54.90°N 05.10°W	NX0161
Glenternie	Scottish Borders	55.61°N 03.25°W	NT2136
Glentham	Lincolnshire	53.39°N 00.49°W	TF0090
Glentirranmuir	Stirling	56.12°N 04.17°W	NS6594
Glentress	Scottish Borders	55.63°N 03.14°W	NT2839
Glentrool Village	Dumfries and Galloway	55.06°N 04.58°W	NX3578
Glentruan	Isle of Man	54.38°N 04.40°W	NX4401
Glentworth	Lincolnshire	53.38°N 00.58°W	SK9488
Glenuig	Highland	56.82°N 05.82°W	NM6777
Glenview	Argyll and Bute	56.40°N 04.96°W	NN1727
Glen Village	Falkirk	55.98°N 03.79°W	NS8878
Glespin	South Lanarkshire	55.53°N 03.90°W	NS8028
Gletness	Shetland Islands	60.24°N 01.17°W	HU4651
Glewstone	Herefordshire	51.89°N 02.65°W	SO5522

=== Gli-Gly ===
Location	Locality	Coordinates (links to map & photo sources)	OS grid reference
Glib Cheois	Western Isles	58.09°N 06.48°W	NB3621
Glimps Holm	Orkney Islands	58.87°N 02.92°W	ND470989
Glinton	Cambridgeshire	52.63°N 00.30°W	TF1505
Globe Town	Tower Hamlets	51.52°N 00.05°W	TQ3582
Glodwick	Oldham	53.53°N 02.09°W	SD9404
Glogue	Pembrokeshire	51.95°N 04.60°W	SN2132
Glooston	Leicestershire	52.54°N 00.89°W	SP7595
Glororum	Northumberland	55.59°N 01.74°W	NU1633
Glossop	Derbyshire	53.43°N 01.95°W	SK0393
Gloucester	Gloucestershire	51.86°N 02.24°W	SO8318
Gloup	Shetland Islands	60.71°N 01.08°W	HP5004
Gloup Holm	Shetland Islands	60.73°N 01.11°W	HP482061
Gloweth	Cornwall	50.25°N 05.10°W	SW7944
Glutton Bridge	Staffordshire	53.19°N 01.88°W	SK0866
Gluvian	Cornwall	50.43°N 04.94°W	SW9164
Glympton	Oxfordshire	51.88°N 01.39°W	SP4221
Glyn	Powys	52.46°N 03.59°W	SN9286
Glyn	Monmouthshire	51.66°N 02.76°W	ST4796
Glynarthen	Ceredigion	52.10°N 04.46°W	SN3148
Glynbrochan	Powys	52.43°N 03.59°W	SN9283
Glyn Castle	Neath Port Talbot	51.70°N 03.69°W	SN8302
Glyn Ceiriog	Wrexham	52.93°N 03.19°W	SJ2038
Glyncoch	Rhondda, Cynon, Taff	51.61°N 03.34°W	ST0792
Glyncoed	Blaenau Gwent	51.78°N 03.21°W	SO1610
Glyncorrwg	Neath Port Talbot	51.67°N 03.63°W	SS8799
Glynde	East Sussex	50.85°N 00.05°E	TQ4508
Glyndebourne	East Sussex	50.87°N 00.05°E	TQ4510
Glyndon	Greenwich	51.486°N 0.078°E	TQ444784
Glyndyfrdwy	Denbighshire	52.96°N 03.28°W	SJ1442
Glyne Gap	East Sussex	50.84°N 00.51°E	TQ7708
Glyn Ebwy	Blaenau Gwent	51.77°N 03.20°W	SO1709
Glynhafren	Powys	52.44°N 03.63°W	SN8984
Glynllan	Bridgend	51.57°N 03.53°W	SS9487
Glynmorlas	Shropshire	52.92°N 03.02°W	SJ3137
Glyn-neath	Neath Port Talbot	51.74°N 03.63°W	SN8706
Glynogwr	Bridgend	51.57°N 03.51°W	SS9587
Glyntaff	Rhondda, Cynon, Taff	51.59°N 03.32°W	ST0889
Glyntawe	Powys	51.83°N 03.68°W	SN8416
