= Gibraltar (disambiguation) =

Gibraltar is a self-governing British Overseas Territory, located to the north of the Strait of Gibraltar on the Iberian Peninsula.

Gibraltar may also refer to:

== Places ==
=== Europe ===
- Strait of Gibraltar, at the western end of the Mediterranean Sea
- Bay of Gibraltar, the area of sea to the West of the Gibraltar Strait
- Campo de Gibraltar, a Spanish comarca and former municipal term and hinterland of the town of Gibraltar
- Gibraltar, Bedfordshire, a location in England
- Gibraltar, Buckinghamshire, England
- Gibraltar, Kent, a location in England
- Gibraltar, Oxfordshire, a location in England
- Gibraltar-Ost and Gibraltar-West, quarters of Luzern, Switzerland
- Gibraltar Mill, Great Bardfield, a windmill now converted to residential use
- Gibraltar Point, Lincolnshire National Nature Reserve, in Lincolnshire, England
- La Línea de Gibraltar, the original name of La Línea de la Concepción in Spain
- Monemvasia, a Greek peninsula and fortress, has been called the Gibraltar of the East
- Petrovaradin Fortress, Petrovaradin, Novi Sad, Serbia, nicknamed "Gibraltar on/of the Danube"
- Rock of Gibraltar, a monolithic rock formation on the European side of the strait

=== United States ===
- Gibraltar, Michigan, a city
- Gibraltar, Pennsylvania, an unincorporated community
- Gibraltar, Washington, an unincorporated community
- Gibraltar, Wisconsin, a town
  - Gibraltar Secondary School, in Wisconsin
  - Gibraltar Area Schools, in Wisconsin
  - Gibraltar District School No. 2, in Wisconsin
- Gibraltar Building, in Newark, New Jersey
- Gibraltar Dam in California
- Gibraltar Island in Ohio
- Gibraltar Rock State Natural Area, in Wisconsin
- Gibraltar School District, in Michigan
- Gibraltar (Wilmington, Delaware), a historic building, in Wilmington, Delaware, USA
- "Gibraltar of the South", an alias for Fort Fisher

=== Australia ===
- Gibraltar Creek, Australian Capital Territory, Australia
- Gibraltar Peak, Australian Capital Territory, Australia
- Gibraltar Range National Park, New South Wales, Australia
- Gibraltar Rock (Western Australia), Western Australia, Australia

=== Others ===
- Gibraltar Hill (disambiguation)
- Gibraltar, Nova Scotia, a community, Canada
- Gibraltar, Venezuela
- Gibraltar Mountain (Alberta), a peak in the Canadian Rockies in Alberta, Canada
- "Gibraltar of the West", poetic name for the Imperial fortress colony of Bermuda
- "Gibraltar of the West Indies", and alias for Brimstone Hill Fortress in Saint Kitts and Nevis
- Gibraltar of the East, Winston Churchill's sobriquet for Singapore Naval Base

== Film ==
- Gibraltar (1938 film), a French drama film directed by Fedor Ozep
- Gibraltar (1964 film), a French thriller film directed by Pierre Gaspard-Huit
- Gibraltar (2011 film), a Rwandan documentary film
- The Informant (2013 film), a French crime thriller film with the original title Gibraltar
- Rocky Gibraltar, a character from the Toy Story film series

== History ==
- Battle of Gibraltar (disambiguation), several historic events
- Gibraltar of South America, an appellation for the Fortress of Humaitá on the River Paraguay
- HMS Gibraltar, the name of seven ships of the Royal Navy
- Kingdom of Gibraltar, one of the historic substantive titles pertaining to the Spanish monarchy
- Marquisate of Gibraltar, a short-lived Castilian nobility title
- Operation Gibraltar, a Pakistan plan to infiltrate Jammu and Kashmir in 1965

== Music ==
- Gibraltar, a song by Joe Zawinul from Black Market, 1976
- Gibraltar, a song by Freddie Hubbard from Freddie Hubbard/Stanley Turrentine in Concert Volume One, 1973 and from Born to Be Blue, 1982
- Gibraltar, a song by Beirut from No, No, No, 2015
- Gibraltar, a 2006 recording from French rapper Abd al Malik (rapper)
- Gibraltar Hardware, drum hardware manufacturer

== Religion ==
- The Diocese of Gibraltar in Europe (Anglican)
- The Roman Catholic Diocese of Gibraltar

== Science ==
- Gibraltar candytuft (Iberis gibraltarica), a plant endemic to Gibraltar

== Other uses ==
- Gibraltar espresso, an espresso drink developed in the US closely related to a Cortado
- Gibraltar rock (candy), hard candy associated with Salem, Massachusetts
- Black Gibraltar, another name for the German/Italian wine grape Trollinger
- Gibraltar (or Gibraltar Life), a brand used by Prudential Financial in several countries
- Gibraltar Point Lighthouse and Gibraltar Point Blockhouse, Toronto, Canada
- 45608 Gibraltar, a British LMS Jubilee Class locomotive
- SS Gibraltar, the former Confederate States Navy ship CSS Sumter
- Gibraltar, a playable character in the game Apex Legends
- Gibraltar (Wilmington, Delaware), country estate home of Hugh Rodney Sharp
