= Glororum, Stannington =

Coordinates: 55.1356°N 1.6974°W

Glororum
- Hamlet
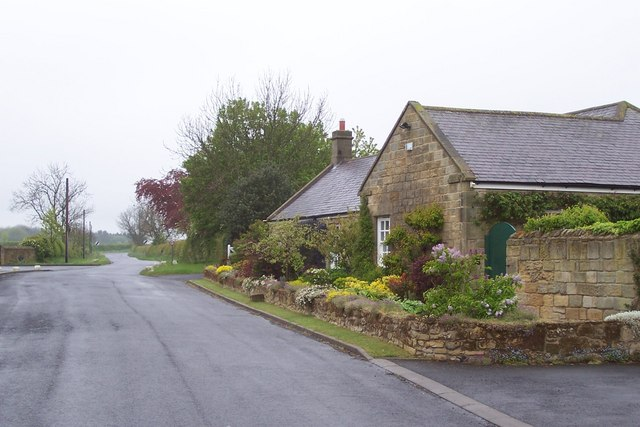
- Road through Glororum

- Location within Northumberland
- OS grid reference: NZ194824
- Unitary authority: Northumberland
- Ceremonial county: Northumberland
- Region: North East
- Country: England
- Sovereign state: United Kingdom
- Post town: MORPETH
- Postcode district: NE61
- Dialling code: 01670
- Police: Northumbria
- Fire: Northumberland
- Ambulance: North East
- UK Parliament: Hexham

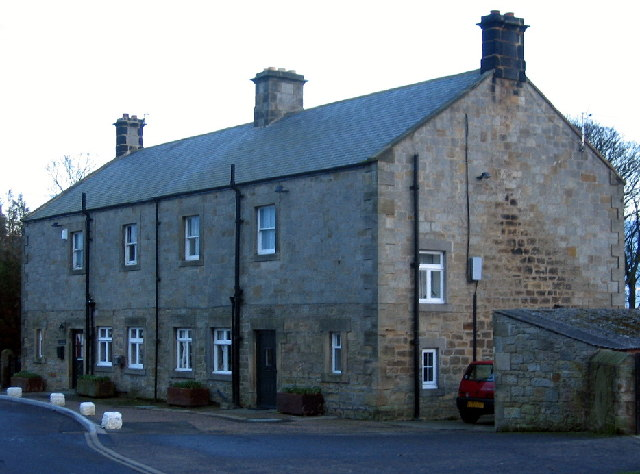
19th century farm building in Glororum

Glororum is a hamlet in the civil parish of Stannington in Northumberland, England, about 0.6 miles (1 km) west of Clifton and the A1 road. The nearest railway station is Morpeth on the East Coast Main Line. An infrequent bus service operates between Morpeth and Stannington or St Mary's Park.

Founded as a farm in the 19th century by the Brown brothers, the name of the settlement is apparently borrowed from Glororum near Bamburgh, whose name is said to be derived from the expression 'Glower over them'.

The settlement consists mostly of 19th century farm buildings, many of which have been converted for residential purposes. A quarry was operated northeast of Glororum. In 1941, some buildings were damaged by bombs.
