= Action of 2 July 1618 =

- Part of Dutch–Barbary war (1618–1622)
| Date | 2–4 July 1618 |
| Location | Gibraltar |
| Result | Dutch Victory |

Belligerents
| Dutch Republic | Regency of Algiers |

Commanders and leaders
| (Dutch Republic) Mooy Lambert | Unknown Pirate |

Strength
| 9 ships | 30 ships |

Casualties and losses
| 1 ship sunk | 20 ships captured, or destroyed, and every pirate thrown overboard |

the Action of 2 July 1618 occurred during an expedition undertaken with the purpose of apprehending pirates, Mooy Lambert encountered a fleet of Algerian corsairs on June 2. This led to a prolonged engagement lasting two days, during which Lambert displayed remarkable prowess, resulting in his victory. As a consequence of this triumph and his subsequent Expedition to Algiers (1624), Lambert gained considerable recognition and is primarily remembered for this significant battle in history.
