= Gig =

Gig or GIG may refer to:

== Arts and entertainment ==
- Concert, known informally as a gig
- The Gig, a 1985 film written and directed by Frank D. Gilroy
- Gig (Circle Jerks album) (1992)
- GIG (Hot Wheels AcceleRacers), a character
- Gig (Northern Pikes album) (1993)
- "GUYS Is Green" ("G.I.G.!"), in the Japanese television series Ultraman Mebius
- KGIG-LP ("104.9 The Gig"), an FM radio station licensed to Modesto, California, US

== Transportation ==
- Gig (boat), a type of boat
- Gig (carriage), a two-wheeled sprung cart to be pulled by a horse
- Cornish pilot gig, a six-oared rowing boat
- Rio de Janeiro–Galeão International Airport (IATA airport code), the main airport serving Rio de Janeiro, Brazil
- Giggleswick railway station (National Rail station code), Yorkshire, England
- Gig Car Share, a carsharing service in parts of the San Francisco Bay Area

== Science and technology ==
- Gigabyte (colloquial gig), a computer unit of information
- Global Information Grid, a military global information network operated by the United States Department of Defense
- Generalized inverse Gaussian distribution, a distribution in probability theory

== People ==
- Gig Gangel (born 1958), Playboy Playmate of the Month for January 1980
- Gig Morton (born 1996), Canadian actor
- Gig Ryan (born 1956), Australian poet born Elizabeth Anne Martina Ryan
- Gig Young (1913–1978), American actor born Byron Elsworth Barr

== Other uses ==
- Gig-mill, a machine for the gigging of textiles that produce a fibrous and soft surface.
- Georgian Industrial Group, a holding company in Georgia
- Gig, temporary work for a specified time
- Gig, a multi-pronged spear used in gigging or hunting fish or small game
- Gig, the blade a professional wrestler uses to cut himself; See List of professional wrestling terms
- GIG Cymru, the Welsh-language name for NHS Wales

== See also ==
- Gig economy, the economy of those in temporary work
- Gig worker, workers who perform temporary work
- Gigg (disambiguation)
- Giggs (disambiguation)
