= Gigg =

Gigg may refer to:

- Gigg, Greater Manchester a suburb of Bury, Greater Manchester
  - Gigg Lane an all-seater football stadium in Bury, Greater Manchester
- Ross Gigg, Australian rugby league footballer

== See also ==
- Gig (disambiguation)
- Giggs (disambiguation)
