= Air Ministry =

Department of the Government of the United Kingdom (1918–1964)

- Coat of Arms of HM Government

Department overview
- Formed: 1918
- Dissolved: 1964
- Superseding Department: Ministry of Defence
- Jurisdiction: Government of the United Kingdom
- Headquarters: Air Ministry Building Whitehall London
- Department executive: Secretary of State for Air
- Parent Department: HM Government

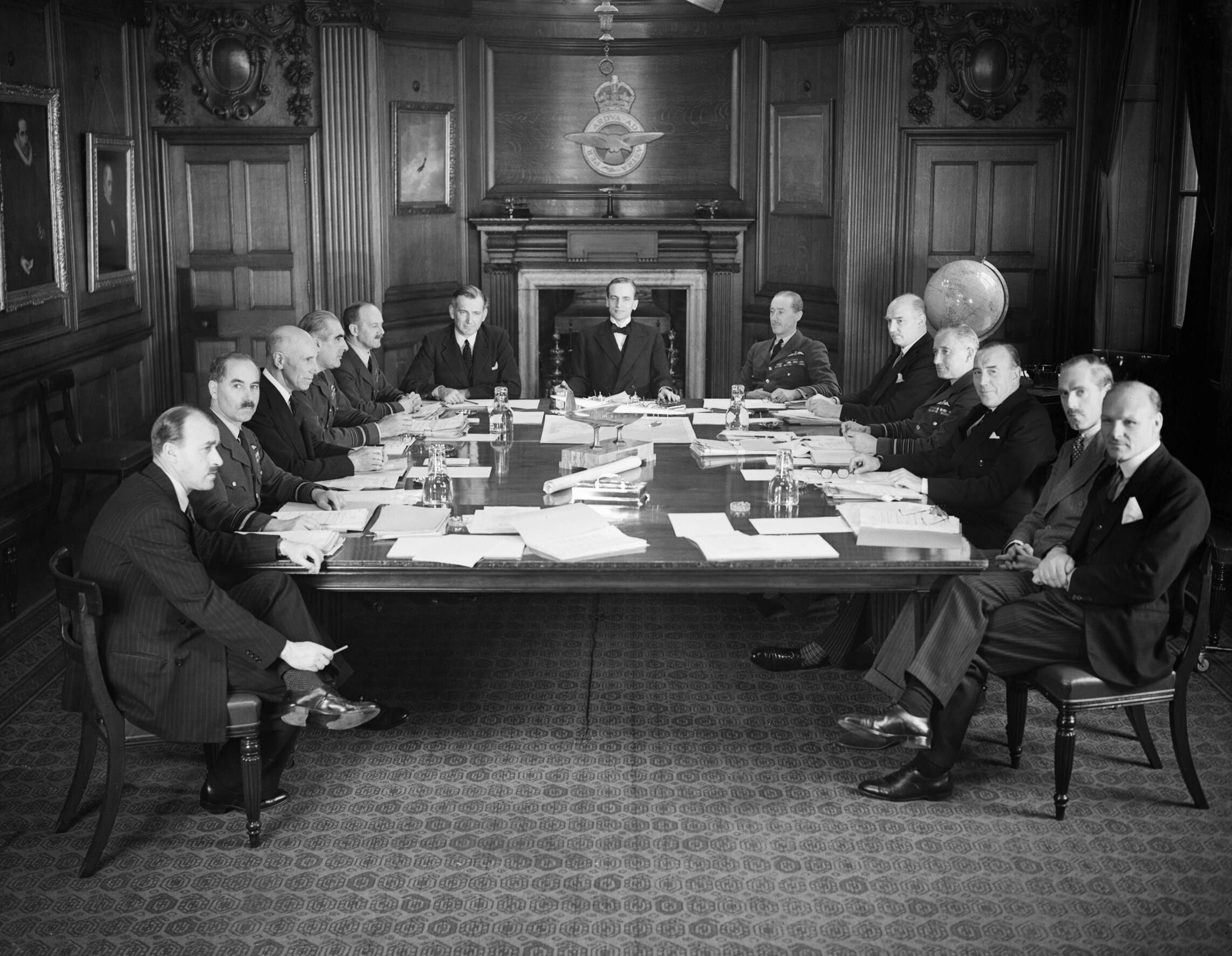
The Air Council in session at the Air Ministry in July 1940

The Air Ministry was a department of the Government of the United Kingdom with the responsibility of managing the affairs of the Royal Air Force and civil aviation that existed from 1918 to 1964. It was under the political authority of the Secretary of State for Air.

== Organisations before the Air Ministry ==
=== The Air Committee ===
On 13 April 1912, less than two weeks after the creation of the Royal Flying Corps (which initially consisted of both a naval and a military wing), an Air Committee was established to act as an intermediary between the Admiralty and the War Office in matters relating to aviation. The new Air Committee was composed of representatives of the two war ministries, and although it could make recommendations, it lacked executive authority. The recommendations of the Air Committee had to be ratified by the Admiralty Board and the Imperial General Staff and, in consequence, the Committee was not particularly effective. The increasing separation of army and naval aviation from 1912 to 1914 only exacerbated the Air Committee's ineffectiveness and the Committee did not meet after the outbreak of the First World War.

=== The Joint War Air Committee ===
By 1916 the lack of co-ordination of the Army's Royal Flying Corps and the Navy's Royal Naval Air Service had led to serious problems, not only in the procurement of aircraft engines, but also in the air defence of Great Britain. It was the supply problems to which an attempt at rectification was first made. The War Committee meeting on 15 February 1916 decided immediately to establish a standing joint naval and military committee to co-ordinate both the design and the supply of materiel for the two air services. This committee was titled the Joint War Air Committee, and its chairman was Lord Derby. It was also at the meeting on 15 February that Lord Curzon proposed the creation of an Air Ministry. As with the pre-war Air Committee, the Joint War Air Committee lacked any executive powers and therefore was not effective. After only eight sittings, Lord Derby resigned from the Committee, stating that "It appears to me quite impossible to bring the two wings closer together ... unless and until the whole system of the Air Service is changed and they are amalgamated into one service."

==== Membership ====
The Joint War Air Committee was composed as follows:

- Chairman – Lord Derby
- Director of Air Services (Admiralty) – Rear Admiral C L Vaughn Lee
- Superintendent of Aircraft Design (Admiralty) – Commodore M F Sueter
- Squadron Commander W Briggs
- Director of Military Aeronautics (War Office) – Major-General Sir David Henderson
- Lieutenant-Colonel E L Ellington

Advisory Members were also appointed as required.

=== The Air Board ===
==== The first Air Board ====
The next attempt to establish effective co-ordination between the two air services was the creation of an Air Board. The first Air Board came into being on 15 May 1916 with Lord Curzon as its chairman. The inclusion of Curzon, a Cabinet Minister, and other political figures was intended to give the Air Board greater status than the Joint War Air Committee. In October 1916 the Air Board published its first report which was highly critical of the arrangements within the British air services. The report noted that although the Army authorities were ready and willing to provide information and take part in meetings, the Navy were often absent from Board meetings and frequently refused to provide information on naval aviation.

==== The second Air Board ====
In January 1917 the prime minister David Lloyd George replaced the chairman Lord Curzon with Lord Cowdray. Godfrey Paine, who served in the newly created post of Fifth Sea Lord and Director of Naval Aviation, sat on the board and this high level representation from the Navy helped to improve matters. Additionally, as responsibility for the design of aircraft had been moved out of single service hands and given to the Ministry of Munitions, some of the problems of inter-service competition were avoided.

The Air Board initially met in the Hotel Cecil on the Strand, familiarly known as the "Hotel Bolo". This was a humorous reference to Bolo Pasha (shot for treason in 1918 by the French government) whose attempts to undermine the French war effort with German-funded newspaper propaganda were likened to the unhelpful rivalry between the RFC and the RNAS.

== Establishment of the Air Ministry ==
Despite attempts at reorganization of the Air Board, the earlier problems failed to be completely resolved. In addition, the growing number of German air raids against Great Britain led to public disquiet and increasing demands for something to be done. As a result, Lloyd George, the British prime minister, established a committee composed of himself and General Jan Smuts, which was tasked with investigating the problems with the British air defences and organizational difficulties which had beset the Air Board.

Towards the end of the First World War, on 17 August 1917, General Smuts presented a report to the War Council on the future of air power. Because of its potential for the 'devastation of enemy lands and the destruction of industrial and populous centres on a vast scale', he recommended a new air service be formed that would be on a level with the Army and Royal Navy. The new air service was to receive direction from a new ministry and on 29 November 1917 the Air Force Bill received Royal Assent and the Air Ministry was formed just over a month later on 2 January 1918. Lord Rothermere was appointed the first Air Minister. On 3 January, the Air Council was constituted as follows:

- Lord Rothermere, Air Minister and President
- Lieutenant-General Sir David Henderson, Additional Member and Vice-President
- Major-General Sir Hugh Trenchard, Chief of the Air Staff
- Major-General (formerly Rear-Admiral) Mark Kerr, Deputy Chief of the Air Staff
- Major-General (formerly Commodore) Godfrey Paine, Master General of Personnel
- Major-General Sefton Brancker, Controller-General of Equipment
- Sir William Weir, Director-General of Aircraft Production in the Ministry of Munitions
- Sir John Hunter, Administrator of Works and Buildings
- Major J L Baird Permanent Under-Secretary

The Air Ministry continued to meet in the Hotel Cecil on the Strand. Later, in 1919, it moved to Adastral House on Kingsway. The creation of the Air Ministry resulted in the disestablishment of the Army Council's post of Director-General of Military Aeronautics.

== History – from 1918 ==
=== 1918–1921 ===
In 1919 the RAF and the Air Ministry came under immense political and inter service pressure for their very existence, particularly in a climate of significantly reduced military expenditure. The battle was kickstarted by the resignation in December 1918 of William Weir the President of the Air Council (the governing body of the Royal Air Force), who wished to return to his commercial activities.

This led the prime minister, Lloyd George, to create a Secretary of State for Air, but not as a Cabinet position, and on 9 January 1919 offered Winston Churchill the two posts of Secretary of State for War, which was a Cabinet position, and Secretary of State for Air both of which he accepted.

This combination under one person by was criticised in both the press and Parliament. However, Churchill re-iterated that the continued "integrity, the unity, the independence of the Royal Air Force will be sedulously and carefully maintained". During 1919 it was also decided that civil aviation was to be brought into the Air Ministry rather than being dealt with by either the Board of Trade or the Foreign Office.

The Army and the War Office had largely agreed to the continued existence of the RAF due, in part, to the enthusiasm for the air service by the Army's political leader Winston Churchill. However, one of the main difficulties for the RAF and Air Ministry in 1919 was the opposition by the Royal Navy to losing their own air service and subsequent lobbying that personnel for naval air purposes afloat be naval officers and ratings – this would have led to a recreation of the now disbanded Royal Naval Air Service. This negotiation led to the creation of RAF Coastal Area the predecessor of RAF Coastal Command to deal with its relationship with the Navy. Throughout 1919 there were discussions between Sir Hugh Trenchard Chief of the Air Staff and Sir Rosslyn Wemyss First Sea Lord as to the nature of the relationship between the Air Force and Air Ministry and the Navy and the Admiralty.

In 1919 the Air Ministry formally took control of supply, design and inspection of all aircraft (aeroplanes and airships) from the Ministry of Munitions. This helped put the existence of Air Ministry on a firmer footing.

Throughout 1919 Churchill persistently supported an independent air force. He presented the White Paper, largely written by Sir Hugh Trenchard, on the future of the RAF on 12 December 1919. It was this White Paper that was to be the effective charter for the RAF and Air Ministry in subsequent years.

=== 1921–1927 ===
In February 1921 Lloyd George appointed Churchill to the Colonial Office and appointed his Chief Whip, Frederick Guest as Secretary of State for Air on 1 April. During his eighteen months in office he played "a minor part in the desperate struggle to maintain the air force's institutional independence in the face of hostile attacks from the War Office and the Admiralty". More importantly in the long term he was also responsible for the appointment of Sir Sefton Brancker to develop civil aviation.

With the fall of Lloyd George Sir Samuel Hoare became the Secretary of State for Air in October 1922 under Bonar Law. On Law's death Stanley Baldwin became Prime Minister and gave the position Cabinet status in May 1923, and Hoare remained in the post until January 1924, when a Labour government took power. Lord Thomson was made Secretary of State for Air. A supporter of airships, Thomson was responsible for the Imperial Airship Scheme, which involved the construction of R101 at the Royal Airship Works at Cardington.

After the fall of the MacDonald government in November 1924 Hoare returned to the Air Ministry. He was interested in developing air links to the Empire and Dominion countries, particularly India and South Africa. He negotiated a subsidy from the Treasury for Imperial Airways to start a service from Cairo to India. Hoare, with his wife Lady Maud, flew on the inaugural 13-day flight to Delhi, leaving Croydon on 26 December 1926 and arriving on 8 January 1927. The air route to Cape Town, after much negotiation, was finalised in 1929, before he left office, but only commenced in 1932.

=== 1927–1929 ===
His time at the Air Ministry was marked by several important developments that were to confirm the status of the Royal Air Force as a separate entity, play a part in the growth of civil aviation and to develop the awareness of the public about aviation.

An early priority for Sir Hugh Trenchard, Chief of the Air Staff 1919–1930, was to establish the officer cadet training college at Cranwell as a permanent establishment. It was Hoare's job to negotiate with the Treasury for the necessary funds. After much resistance Hoare managed to include a provision for permanent buildings in his estimates for 1929. The foundation stone of the Royal Air Force College Cranwell was laid in 1929 and formally opened in 1934.

Trenchard had conceived the idea of a university air officer training corps, a sort of Territorial Army for the R.A.F. Hoare and particularly his well connected Parliamentary Private Secretary the academic Sir Geoffrey Butler, then created University Air Squadrons, at Cambridge University then at Oxford University in October 1925, without, however the militarism of the Officer Training Corps and in close collaboration with scientific and engineering work of the Universities.

The Air Ministry was also responsible for civil aviation. Early on Hoare set up the Civil Air Transport Subsidies Committee under the Chairmanship of Sir Hubert Hambling to look at the system of subsidies to competing air lines. They reported in February 1923, favouring a single commercial company to run Britain's air routes. In March 1924 Imperial Airways was created from a merger of the four largest airlines.

The third aspect of Hoare's time at the Air Ministry (after the R.A.F. and civil airlines) was to make public opinion sympathetic to air power and air travel. His much publicised flight to India in 1926-7 was part of this. He also realised the importance of the Schneider Trophy and was instrumental in making sure that the R.A.F was involved. Britain's winning entries in 1927, 1929 and 1931 were flown by R.A.F. pilots and the teams partially subsidised by the Air Ministry.

== Activities ==
=== Aircraft production ===
The Air Ministry issued specifications for aircraft that British aircraft companies would supply prototypes to. These were then assessed, if ordered the Ministry assigned the aircraft name. (see List of Air Ministry specifications).

The ordering procedure used I.T.P. (Intention to Proceed) contract papers; these specified a maximum fixed price, which could (after investigation) be less. But when Lord Nuffield got the I.T.P. contract papers for a Wolseley radial aero engine, which would have required re-orientation of their offices with an army of chartered accountants, he decided to deal only with the War Office and the Admiralty, not the Air Ministry. So the aero engine project was abandoned in 1936, see Airspeed. Nevil Shute Norway wrote that the loss of such a technically advanced engine was a great loss to Britain as well as Airspeed, and blamed the over-cautious high civil servants of the Air Ministry. When he had asked Lord Nuffield to retain the engine, Nuffield said: I tell you, Norway ... I sent that I.T.P. thing back to them, and I told them they could put it where the monkey put the nuts!

In later years the actual production of aircraft was the responsibility of the Ministry of Aircraft Production (1940–46), the Ministry of Supply (1946–59), the Ministry of Aviation (1959–67) and finally the Ministry of Technology (1967–70).

=== Research and development ===
In the 1920s and early 1930s research and development was more than 20% of the Air Ministry’s total expenditure on aircraft and equipment, making it the largest research and development spending institution in Britain, until it was outstripped by private industry in the later 1930s.

=== Weather forecasting ===
The Air Ministry was responsible for weather forecasting over the UK, from 1919 it being the government department responsible for the Meteorological Office.

As a result of the need for weather information for aviation, the Meteorological Office located many of its observation and data collection points on RAF stations.

=== World War II technology ===
In the 1930s, the Air Ministry commissioned a scientific study of propagating electromagnetic energy which concluded that a death ray was impractical but detection of aircraft appeared feasible. Robert Watson-Watt demonstrated a working prototype and patented the device in 1935 (British Patent GB593017). The device served as the base for the Chain Home network of radars to defend Great Britain.

By April 1944, the ministry's air Intelligence branch had succeeded in its intelligence efforts regarding "the beams, the Bruneval Raid, the Gibraltar barrage, radar, Window, heavy water, and the German nightfighters" (R.V. Jones). Other World War II technology and warfare efforts included the branch's V-1 and V-2 Intelligence activities.

== Abolition ==
In 1964 the Air Ministry merged with the Admiralty and the War Office to form the Ministry of Defence.

== See also ==
- Secretary of State for Air
