= Battle of Gibraltar =

The Battle of Gibraltar may refer to:

- Battle of Gibraltar (1563), a minor naval battle of 1563
- Battle of the Strait of Gibraltar, a naval battle during the Anglo-Spanish War (1585–1604)
- Battle of Gibraltar (1607), a naval battle during the Eighty Years' War
- Battle of Gibraltar (1618), a minor naval battle during the Eighty Years' War
- Battle of Gibraltar (1621), a naval battle during the Eighty Years' War
- Capture of Gibraltar, a 1704 engagement during the War of the Spanish Succession

== See also ==
- List of sieges of Gibraltar
