= Dutch expedition to Algiers (1624) =

Expedition to Algiers (1624)
- Part of Dutch-Barbary war
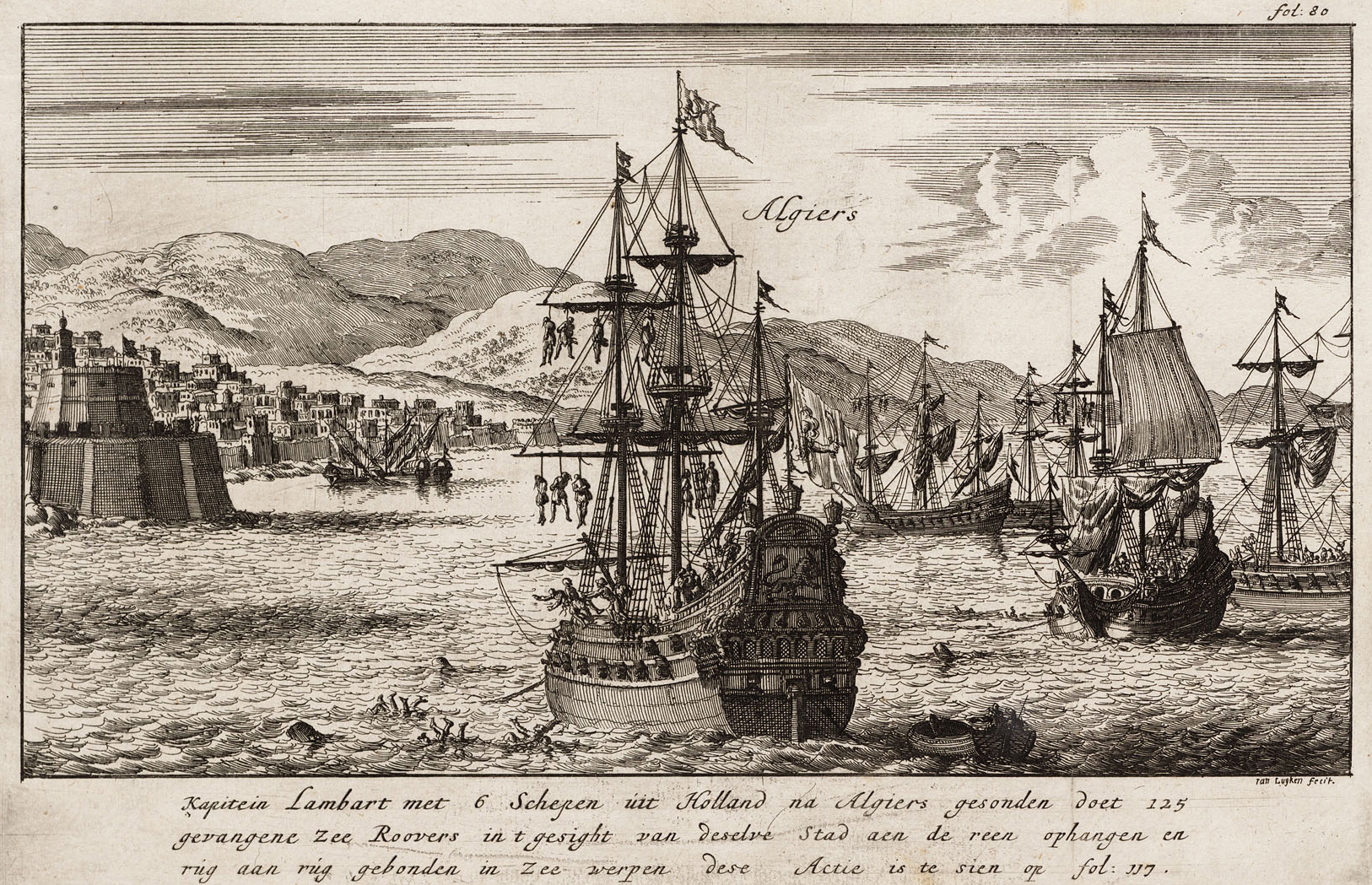
- Lambert in front of the city of Algiers hanging Algerian pirates
Date	1624
Location	Algiers, Deylik of Algiers
Result	Dutch victory

Belligerents
Dutch Republic	Deylik of Algiers

Commanders and leaders
(Dutch Republic) Mooy Lambert	Kader Pasha; Divan at that time

Strength
6 Vessels	unknown

Casualties and losses
unknown	Several hundreds hanged, or thrown into the sea to drown

In 1622, during the Dutch-Barbary war, the Dutch Republic and The Regency of Algiers concluded a peace treaty. The Algerians failed to respect the treaty. Following this the Dutch set out a punitive expedition to punish the Algerians.

== Background ==
Between 1613-1622 Algerian Barbary pirates were very active around the Mediterranean Sea. They attacked numerous Dutch ships, which annoyed both the States General, and all of the Dutch merchants, who were getting rich in the Dutch Golden Age. After a twelve year long truce between the Dutch and the Spanish. The Dutch sought to form alliances with numerous North Africa countries against Spain. When they had finally concluded a peace treaty in 1622 after the Dutch–Barbary war. The Algerians did not respect the treaty, and kept attacking Dutch ships, and the Dutch were frustrated with the Algerian barbary pirates. So the Dutch admiral Mooy Lambert got instructions from the States General to launch a punitive expedition against the Algerians.

== Expedition ==
Admiral Lambert soon arrived at the mouth of the Algerian harbor with a great number of Algerian corsairs which he captured, and beat up along his way. He anchored his squadron in the harbor and sent word to the pasha that he demanded the immediate release of all Dutch slaves and all of the captured vessels, cargo, and goods. Lambert threatened that if the pasha did not do as he said, the admiral would hang all of the Algerian officers and crewman he had captured. The pasha refused, believing that Lambert was bluffing. Lambert then hanged every Algerian captive on his ship, and drowned the rest that did not fit on his ships to hang, and then turned his squadron around and sailed back into the sea with dead Algerian captives on top of his ship. This horrified the Algerian populace and the pasha. The city convulsed with wailing crowds and tumultuous clamor at the gates of the pasha's palace. There was no time for the pasha and his officers to fully consider the implications of the event, as they soon beheld the return of Lambert's squadron with a fresh collection of captured corsairs and their crews. Lambert again anchored in the harbor and repeated his demands with the same threat if they were not met. The pasha then immediately released every Dutch captive and restored the Dutch properties. However Lambert did not return those captured Algerians. He took them home to the Dutch Republic, and it is unknown what he did with them there.
