= Clifton, Northumberland =

Hamlet in Northumberland, England

Coordinates: 55.136°N 1.680°W

Clifton
- Location within Northumberland
- OS grid reference: NZ205825
- Unitary authority: Northumberland
- Ceremonial county: Northumberland
- Region: North East
- Country: England
- Sovereign state: United Kingdom
- Post town: MORPETH
- Postcode district: NE61
- Dialling code: 01670
- Police: Northumbria
- Fire: Northumberland
- Ambulance: North East
- UK Parliament: Hexham

Clifton is a hamlet in Northumberland, in England. The population is between 20 and 30. It is situated a short distance to the south of Morpeth, on the A1. It forms a trio with Hepscott and Glororum, a series of farms founded by the Brown brothers at the end of the 19th century. However, Clifton as a habitation stretches back earlier. In the 12th century lands were held at Clifton, under Roger de Merlay, by William of Clifton. There was a coaching inn here dating from the 17th century.

== Governance ==
Clifton is in the parliamentary constituency of Hexham. It is part of Stannington Civil Parish.
