= Wool, Dorset =

Village in Dorset, England

Coordinates: 50.6789°N 2.2189°W

Wool
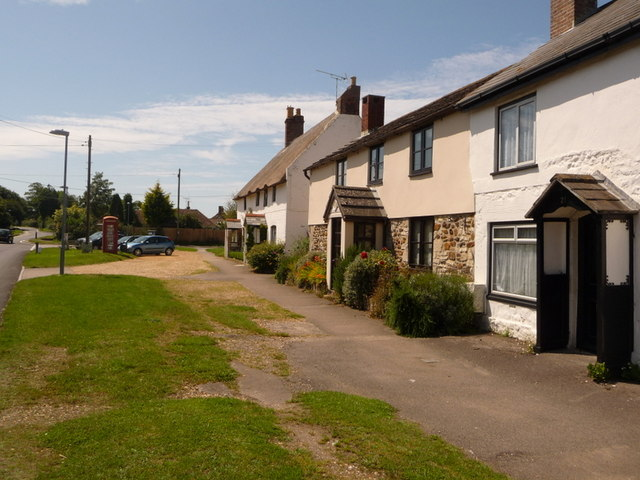
- High Street, Wool

- Location within Dorset
- Population: 5,310 (2011)
- OS grid reference: SY839865
  - London: 109 miles (175 km) NE
- Unitary authority: Dorset
- Ceremonial county: Dorset
- Region: South West
- Country: England
- Sovereign state: United Kingdom
- Post town: WAREHAM
- Postcode district: BH20
- Dialling code: 01929
- Police: Dorset
- Fire: Dorset and Wiltshire
- Ambulance: South Western
- UK Parliament: South Dorset

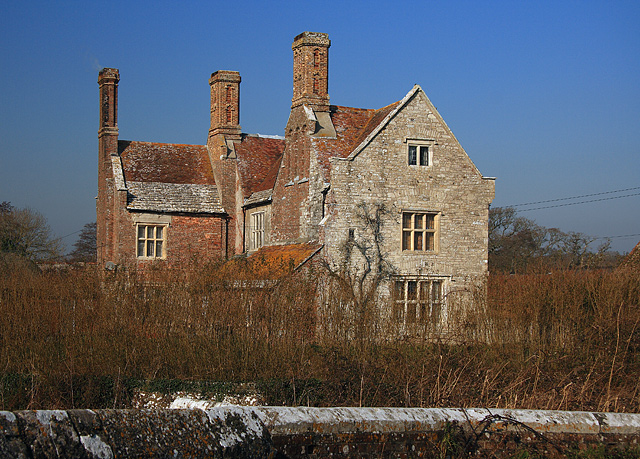
Woolbridge Manor

Wool is a large village, civil parish and electoral ward in south Dorset, England. In the 2011 census the parish – which includes Bovington Camp army base to the north – had 2,015 households and a population of 5,310. The village lies at a historic bridging point on the River Frome, halfway between Dorchester and Wareham. Woolbridge Manor House, a 17th-century building, is a prominent feature just outside the village and the location of Tess's honeymoon in Thomas Hardy's Tess of the D'Urbervilles. Other prominent features of the village include the medieval church of Holy Rood, the railway station on the South West Main Line from London Waterloo to Weymouth, and the thatched cottages along Spring Street.

The place-name 'Wool' is first attested in Anglo-Saxon Writs from 1002 to 1012, where it appears as Wyllon. In the Domesday Book of 1086 it appears as Wille and Welle, and as Welles in 1212 in the Book of Fees. The name means 'springs' in the sense of the related word wells.

Near Wool, to the east of the village, are the ruins of Bindon Abbey, which was demolished in the Dissolution of the Monasteries of 1539, the stone being used to build castles in Portland, Lulworth and Sandsfoot.

A small single-lane hump-backed stone bridge, a Grade II* listed structure about 200m north from the railway station, is no longer used for vehicular traffic. The place name Wullebrigg, recorded in 1244, indicates a crossing here in the thirteenth century and there is an extant record from 1343 of a bridge crossing the River Frome at this point. It has a stone half-way along it stating that those who deface or damage the bridge will be transported (sent to Australia or another penal colony) for the rest of their lives. In January 2018 one of the bridge's stone parapets collapsed, undermined by floodwater, but the arches remained undamaged.

Local places of interest include The Tank Museum and Monkey World. Nearby hamlets include East Burton and Giddy Green.
