= Battle of Gibraltar (1621) =

1621 naval battle of the Eighty Years' War

Coordinates: 36.138887°N 5.398607°W

- Part of the Eighty Years' War
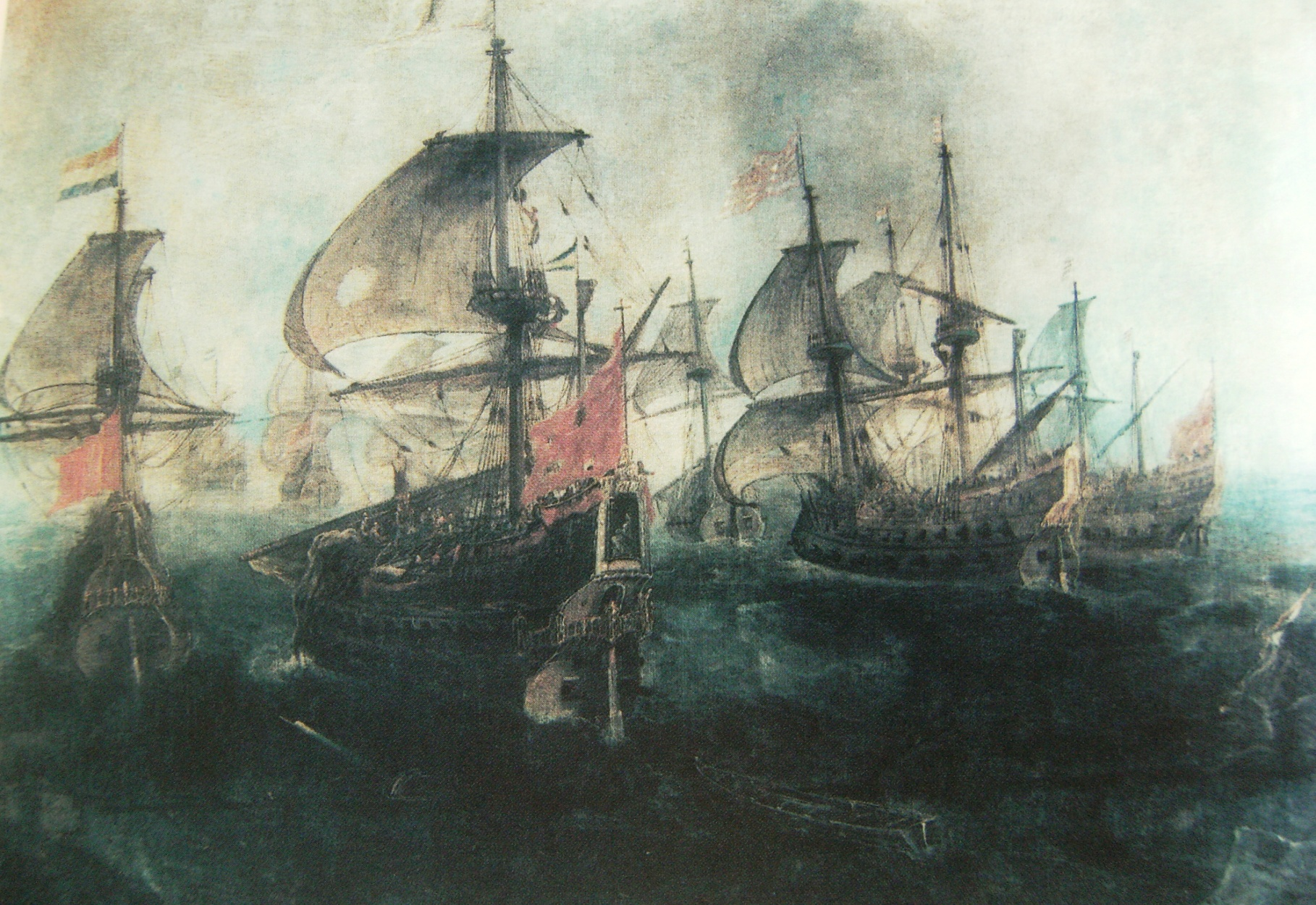
- The Battle of Gibraltar, by Enrique Jácome y Brocas, c. 1630
Date	21 August 1621
Location	Bay of Gibraltar
Result	Spanish victory

Belligerents
Spain	Dutch Republic; Denmark–Norway

Commanders and leaders
(Spain) Fadrique de Toledo	(Dutch Republic) Willem de Zoete

Strength
6 galleons; 3 warships	20 warships; 30 merchant ships

Casualties and losses
None	5 ships sunk; 2 ship captured

The Battle of Gibraltar took place on 10 August 1621, during the Eighty Years' War between the Spanish Empire and the Dutch Republic. A Dutch East India Company fleet, escorted by a squadron under Willem Haultain de Zoete, was intercepted and defeated by nine ships of Spain's Atlantic fleet under Fadrique de Toledo while passing the Strait of Gibraltar.

When the Twelve Years' Truce between Spain and the Dutch Republic ended, the Spanish wished to deal a decisive blow against the Dutch trading ships in the Mediterranean. The Spanish attempted to concentrate a fleet in the Bay of Gibraltar, but admirals Martín de Vallecilla, Juan Fajardo, and Don Francisco de Acevedo, with their respective squadrons, failed to join Toledo's squadron, which left Cádiz on 6 August 1621. Toledo thus faced the Dutch with only nine ships. Four days later, the Dutch trading fleet of more than 50 ships was sighted; 20 were warships and the rest were merchantmen.

While Toledo engaged a succession of Dutch ships with his powerful flagship, setting two on fire, the smaller Spanish galleons captured two ships and torched another. The Spanish flagship Santa Teresa was eventually dismasted and had to be taken in tow. The Dutch retreated with most of their valuable merchantmen, having lost seven ships. The Spanish returned to Cádiz having suffered damage, but lost no ships.

== Background ==
A truce in the Eighty Years' War between the Spanish Empire and the rebellious Dutch Republic allowed the Basque-Spanish admiral Miguel de Vidazabal, commander of the Spanish Gibraltar squadron, to cooperate with Dutch ships under Mooy Lambert against the Barbary pirates, or corsairs. This resulted in sixteen corsair vessels being captured and brought into Gibraltar. The truce broke down in 1621 after twelve years. The Dutch went on the naval offensive, and a combined Dutch-Danish fleet of thirty-one ships entered the Mediterranean. The Count-Duke of Olivares, in charge of Spain's foreign policy, determined on a naval counter-offensive, the goal of which was to interrupt the important maritime trade of the Dutch East Indies Company (VOC). Philip IV of Spain supported this strategy.

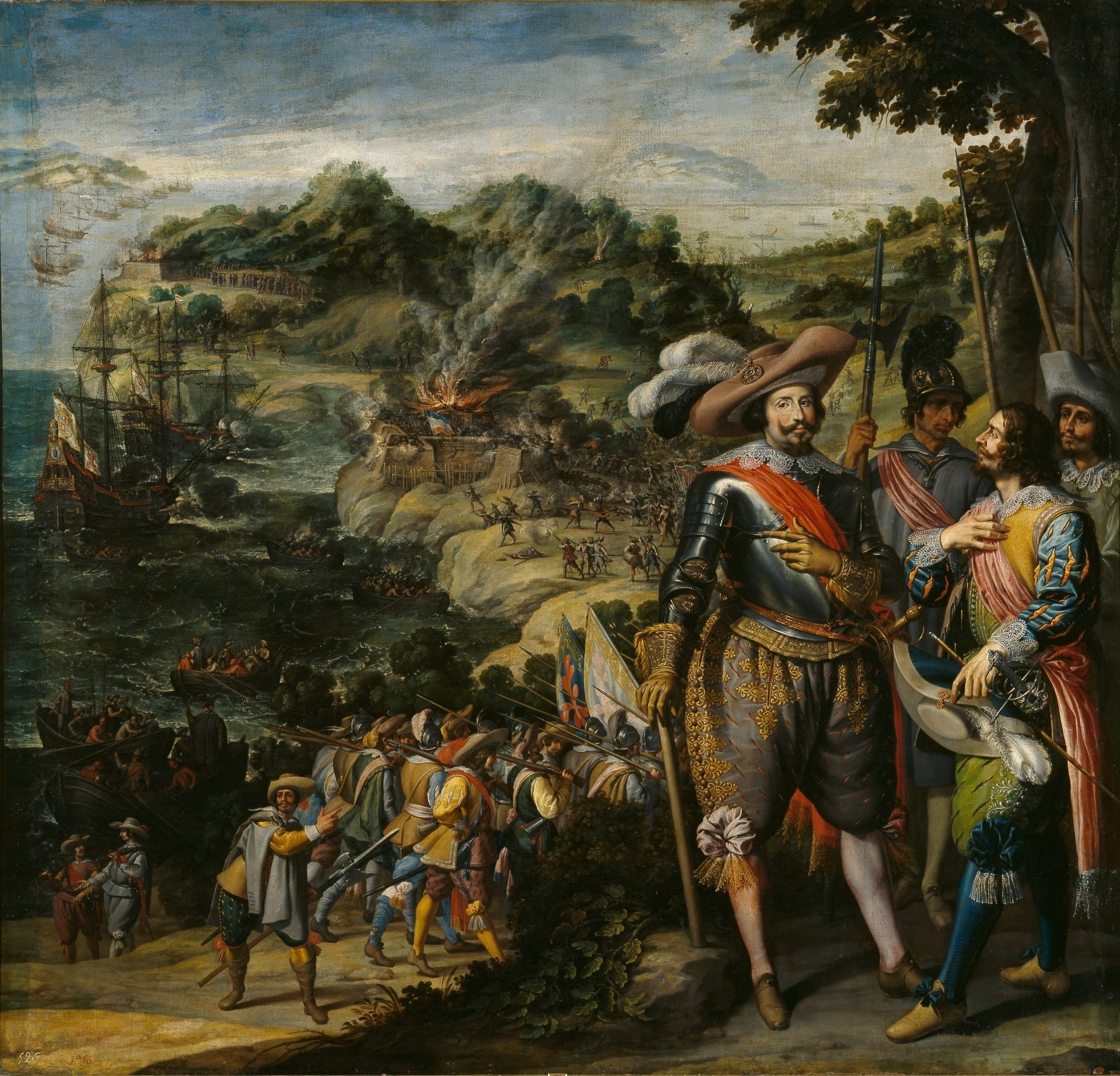
Portrait of Fadrique de Toledo during the capture of Saint Kitts.

Spanish maritime intelligence learnt that a convoy of at least twenty Dutch ships from Venice was to pass through the Strait of Gibraltar. The Dutch ships would be well-armed and crewed, and have an appreciable escort, and so the Spanish would need to concentrate their forces in order to effectively oppose it. To achieve this, the Spanish Armada del Mar Océano, then the elite of the Spanish naval forces, had nine ships commanded by Don Fadrique de Toledo. It was arranged for these to rendezvous in Lisbon with four vessels under the command of Don Martin de Vallecilla and nine of the Biscay Fleet, commanded by Don Francisco de Acevedo. However, a lack of supplies and guns, together with the general inefficiency of the Spanish logistic services prevented a number of these ships from being ready in time, despite the sharp and urgent orders issued.

The Armada del Océano was better prepared and sailed from Cadiz on 31 July toward Cape St. Vincent, where it was hoped that at least some ships of the other two divisions would be able to join it. In the event that they did not arrive in time for the planned attack. Don Toledo had his flagship, the Santa Teresa, one of the most powerful galleons in Europe, and six much smaller vessels: three of about 450 tons; and three of about 330 tons. He also had two pataches, capable of scouting and carrying messages. Such a force was smaller than initially planned and it was uncertain if it would be strong enough to risk an attack against the anticipated strength of the Dutch fleet. But Toledo, one of the most renown admirals of the time, was determined to attack. On August 6, he received a message from the major of Málaga notifying him that more than 26 Dutch ships were anchoring 2 miles (3 km) from the city, preparing to pass the Strait of Gibraltar.

Believing that the smaller Spanish squadrons were on their way to meet them, and fearing that these may be defeated in detail, the Spanish held a council of war and decided to attack immediately. They sailed into the Strait and anchored in the Bay of Algeciras on 8 August. On August 9, two suspicious sails were spotted from the fort of Ceuta, and the alarm was given. The Spanish squadron sailed to investigate and sighted the Dutch fleet. For the rest of the day and through the night the Spanish squadron observed the movements of the Dutch.

== Engagement ==
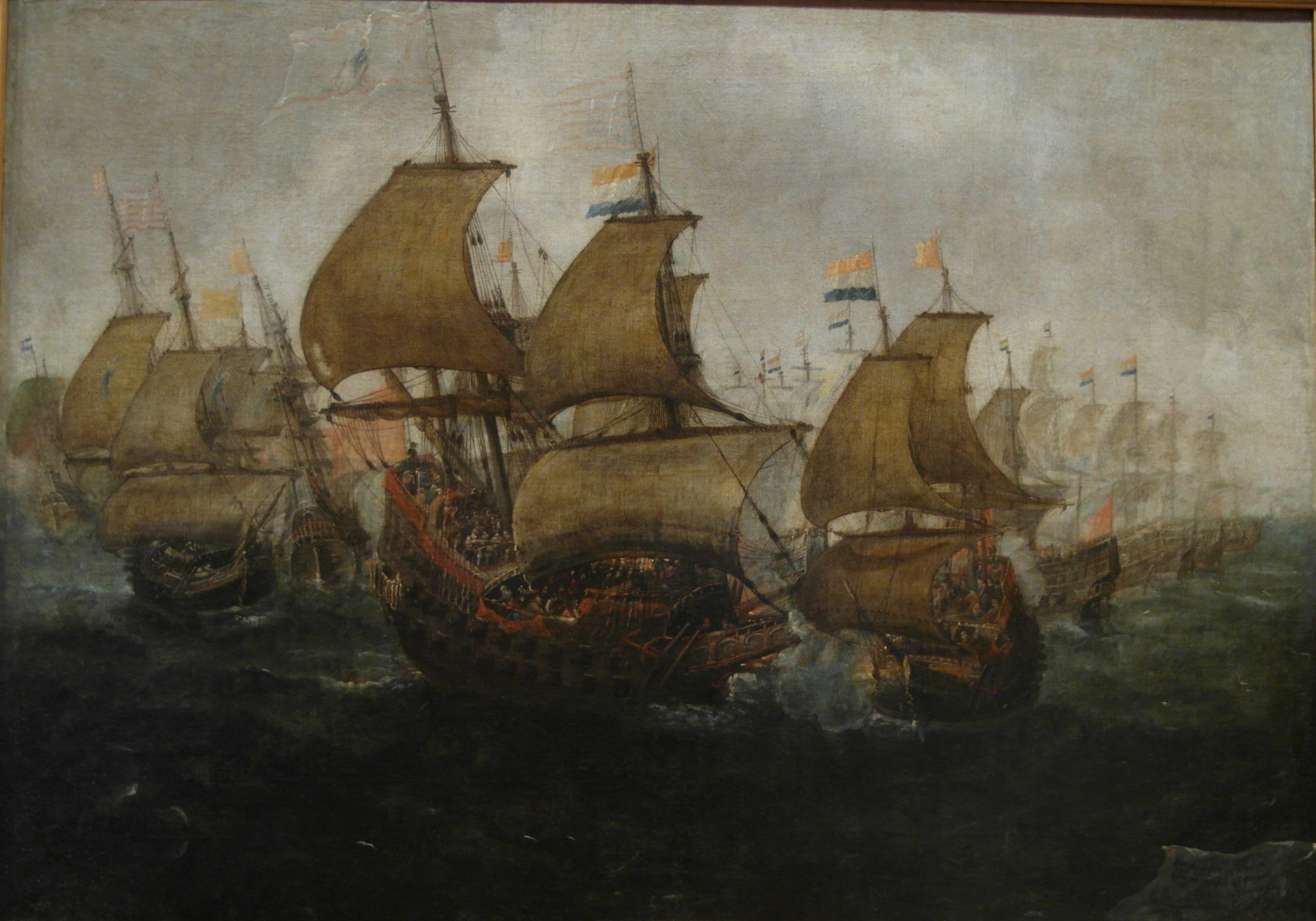
Detail from The Battle of Gibraltar, by Enrique Jácome y Brocas

The Dutch fleet arrived in two groups: one of 24 ships in formation and another, scattered group of about seven. Escorting the convoy were a dozen Dutch warships, all strongly armed, and including two reported as being particularly large, all under the command of Admiral Willem Haultain de Zoete. The Dutch adopted a crescent-shaped formation. Their strategy was to refuse combat if at all possible, and to concentrate on protecting the valuable merchant ships from capture. They were under orders not to open fire unless attacked. The Dutch were to windward of the Spanish, which gave Toledo the choice of attacking or not. The historian Agustin González has estimated that the six smaller Spanish galleons were barely equivalent in fighting power to the twelve ships of the Dutch escort. The most important ship of the engagement was the Spanish flagship Santa Teresa, a vessel much larger and more powerful than any other on either side. The Spanish sailed down on the Dutch, hoping to break up the Dutch formation and then exploit their ships' greater manoeuvrability.

Initially, Santa Teresa fired a warning shot demanding that the Dutch surrender. Haultain's fleet immediately returned fire. The Dutch ships fired at medium range, but Santa Teresa held fire until almost alongside the Dutch ships before firing. The eventual Spanish broadsides caused a "horrible effect to those watching from land and sea". These caused such damage and casualties that the Dutch retreated. Santa Teresa then cut through the Dutch formation, firing in all directions and receiving numerous discharges in return. The galleon of Don Alonso de Mujica boarded and seized a Dutch man-of-war, while the Santa Ana, commanded by Don Carlos Ibarra, did the same with another. Even one of the pataches, commanded by Captain Don Domingo de Hoyos, engaged a Dutch ship, foolhardy given the inequality of force. The Spanish flagship broke entirely through the Dutch formation and turned back towards the convoy. Her close-range fire ignited at least one Dutch ship, and she engaged so closely that at one point the fire spread to the Santa Teresa, which had to break off to extinguish it. She then returned to engage the burning Dutch ship from the weather side, so that the flames would be blown away from her.

The Spanish flagship was fired on by much of the Dutch fleet, and despite her size and strength the damage was severe, with at least two of her masts down. With Santa Teresa out of the fight and the Dutch fleeing, the remaining Spanish ships drew off and the battle ended at about 3:00 pm. The balance of loss was favorable to the Spanish: they had sunk or burnt five enemy ships; and two more were captured. The Spanish lost no ships, and by far the most damaged was the Santa Teresa, still capable of fighting but unable to manoeuvre due to the loss of her masts. Don Luis de Noroña (or Noronha), captain general of Ceuta, witnessed the battle and sent a brig with gunpowder, food, medical supplies, and a surgeon. He also sent a message congratulating the squadron leader saying he "did not know that Toledo was at this place [but] he did not think that it could be another who so bravely and with so few ships had disrupted so many". The Spanish returned to Cádiz.

== Aftermath ==
Toledo was slightly wounded by a splinter, but recovered. He went on to further successes in a long career, the climax of which was the naval expedition to Brazil which recaptured Bahia from the Dutch. In the Spanish court, much was made of the event, and Philip IV rewarded those who had most distinguished themselves in combat with grants and pensions. Toledo was given the rank of captain general of Portugal. The painter Enrique Jácome y Brocas was commissioned to produce a series of paintings illustrating the different phases of the battle, the first of which is currently held in the Naval Museum of Madrid. The Dutch Admiralty of Amsterdam commissioned Abraham de Verwer to produce a commemorative painting.

The battle forced the Dutch to provide their merchant ships with more and heavier guns, and to escort them more strongly. Based in Ostend, the twenty galleons of the Spanish Flemish fleet began to attack Dutch shipping in the North Sea, assisted by the Dunkirkers, commerce raiders in the service of the Spanish monarchy. From January 1622 increasing numbers of Dutch ships were captured by these forces. The Dutch were expelled from South America, Guayaquil, and Puerto Rico. At the same time the Spanish all but swept the Barbary pirates from the Mediterranean. The Spanish monarch was given the sobriquet "the Great" as a result of this string of successes.

== Sources ==
- Hume, M. A. S. (1898). Spain, its Greatness and Decay, 1479–1788. Oxford University Press. OCLC 457309379.
- Fernández Duro, C. (1898). Armada española (in Spanish). Vol. 4. Madrid: Rivadeneyra. OCLC 4413652.
- Glete, J. (2002). Warfare at sea, 1500–1650. London: Routledge. ISBN 9780203024560.
- González, A. (2006). Victorias por mar de los españoles (in Spanish). Madrid: Grafite. ISBN 9788496281387.
- Goodman, D. (2002). Spanish naval power, 1589–1665. Cambridge University Press. ISBN 9780521522571.
- Israel, J. (1989). The Dutch Republic and the Hispanic World. Oxford: Clarendon Press. ISBN 9780198219989.
- Jackson, G. (2001). The rock of the Gibraltarians. Gibraltar: Gibraltar Books. ISBN 9780838632376.
- San Juan, V. La batalla naval de las Dunas (in Spanish). Madrid: Silex. ISBN 9788477371847.
