= Dutch–Barbary war =

War between the Dutch Republic and Barbary pirates

- Action between Dutch ships and Barbary pirates
Date	1618–1622
Location	Mediterranean Sea
Result	Algerian-Tunisian Victory

Belligerents
Dutch Republic	Regency of Algiers; Eyalet of Tunis

Commanders and leaders
(Dutch Republic) Mooy Lambert (Dutch Republic) Hillebrand Quast (Dutch Republic) Willem de Zoete	Kader Pasha; Kassan Kaid Kussa; Mustapha IV Pasha; Hasan IV; Kussa Mustapha; Murad I Bey

Strength
Lambert's 2nd–3rd fleet: (1618–1620); 13 warships De Zoete's fleet: (1620–1621) (Note: These fleets were not sent to attack Algiers, or Tunis but rather to patrol in the Mediterranean); 17 warships	Began as 60 ships in 1613, then grew to 80–90 in 1620

Casualties and losses
88 merchant ships seized and at least 300 enslaved (Note: The ships seized where not part of Lambert's, Quast's, or Willem's fleet but rather merchants captured by Barbary pirates during the war.)	16–20 ships captured, or destroyed

The Dutch–Barbary war, also referred to as the Dutch–Algerian war (1618–1622), was a conflict that originated from the activities of Barbary pirates targeting Dutch vessels. In response to these attacks, the Dutch launched several expeditions aimed at putting an end to the attacks on Dutch vessels and safeguarding their ships. Ultimately, these efforts proved successful as both nations recognized the significance of peace in maintaining a prosperous economy.

== Background ==
Barbary pirates were pirates who began their operations in the early 17th century in the Mediterranean Sea. Subsequently, they experienced substantial growth in their activities, leading to an increase in their popularity.

During the early 17th century, the Dutch Republic embarked on an extensive territorial expansion, solidifying its dominant position as a major maritime power. Concurrently, it established a vast presence in international trade, making significant inroads in global commerce. The Dutch strategically established colonies and trading posts across various continents, including Asia, Africa, and the Americas, facilitating the flourishing exchange of valuable commodities, ranging from spices and textiles to precious metals. As a result of these endeavors, the Dutch Republic emerged as one of the foremost trading nations of that era, commanding a pervasive influence across the seas.

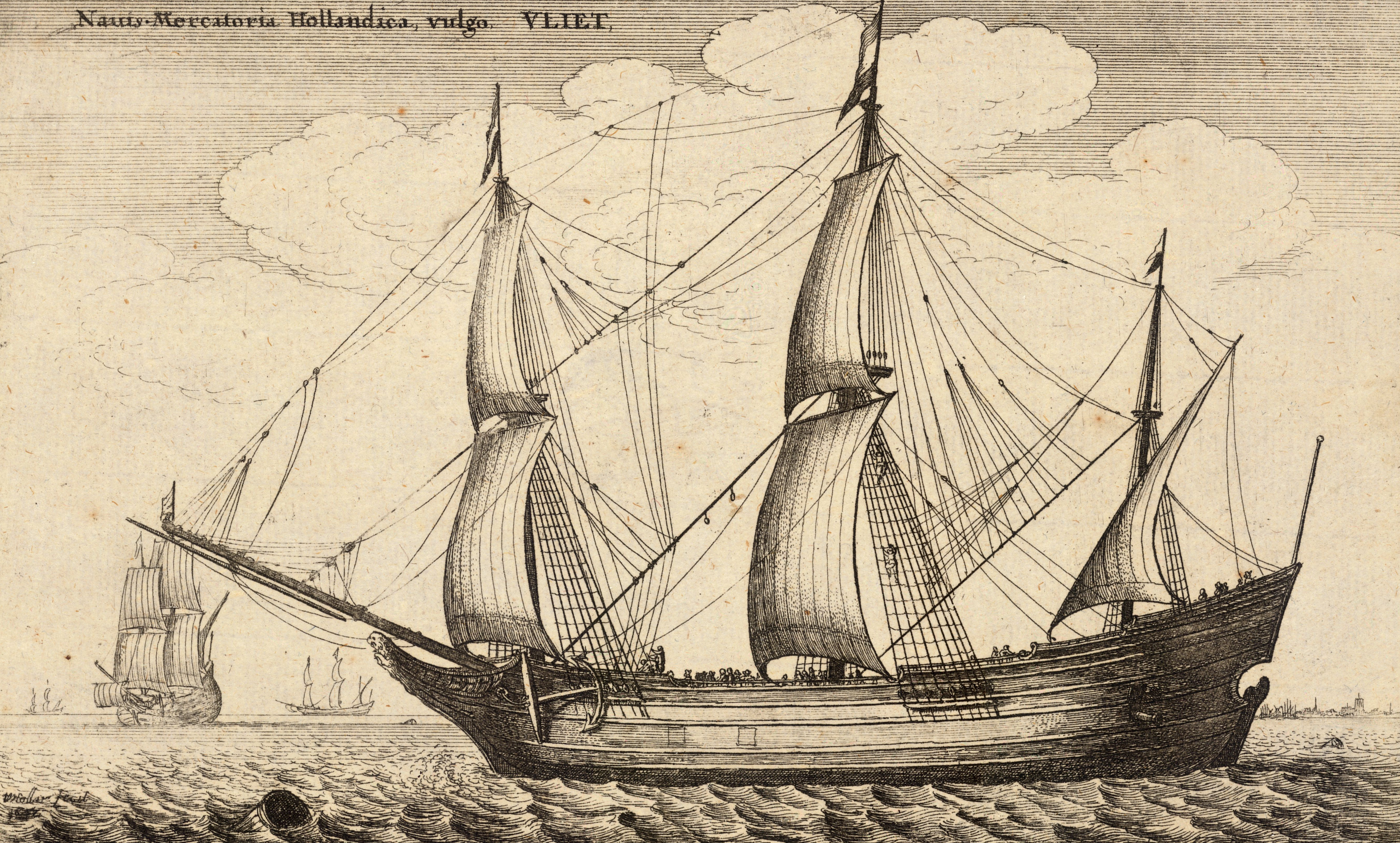
Dutch fluyt, 1667. Most likely Dutch ship to be harassed by barbary pirates.

The Dutch Republic displayed robust activity in the Mediterranean Sea engaging in frequent trade within the region. They established significant trade ties with countries situated along the Mediterranean coast, forging commercial relationships that were characterized by regular exchanges of goods and commodities. The Dutch's active presence in the Mediterranean facilitated the flow of various valuable products, further contributing to their status as a major trading nation during this period. The Dutch, who were known for their economic prosperity and active engagement in trade, found itself as a target of Barbary pirates in the Mediterranean Sea. These pirates, seeking to plunder the wealth carried by Dutch ships, engaged in acts of harassment and attacks. Consequently, in 1618, the Dutch authorities responded by declaring war on both Tunisia and Algiers.

== War ==
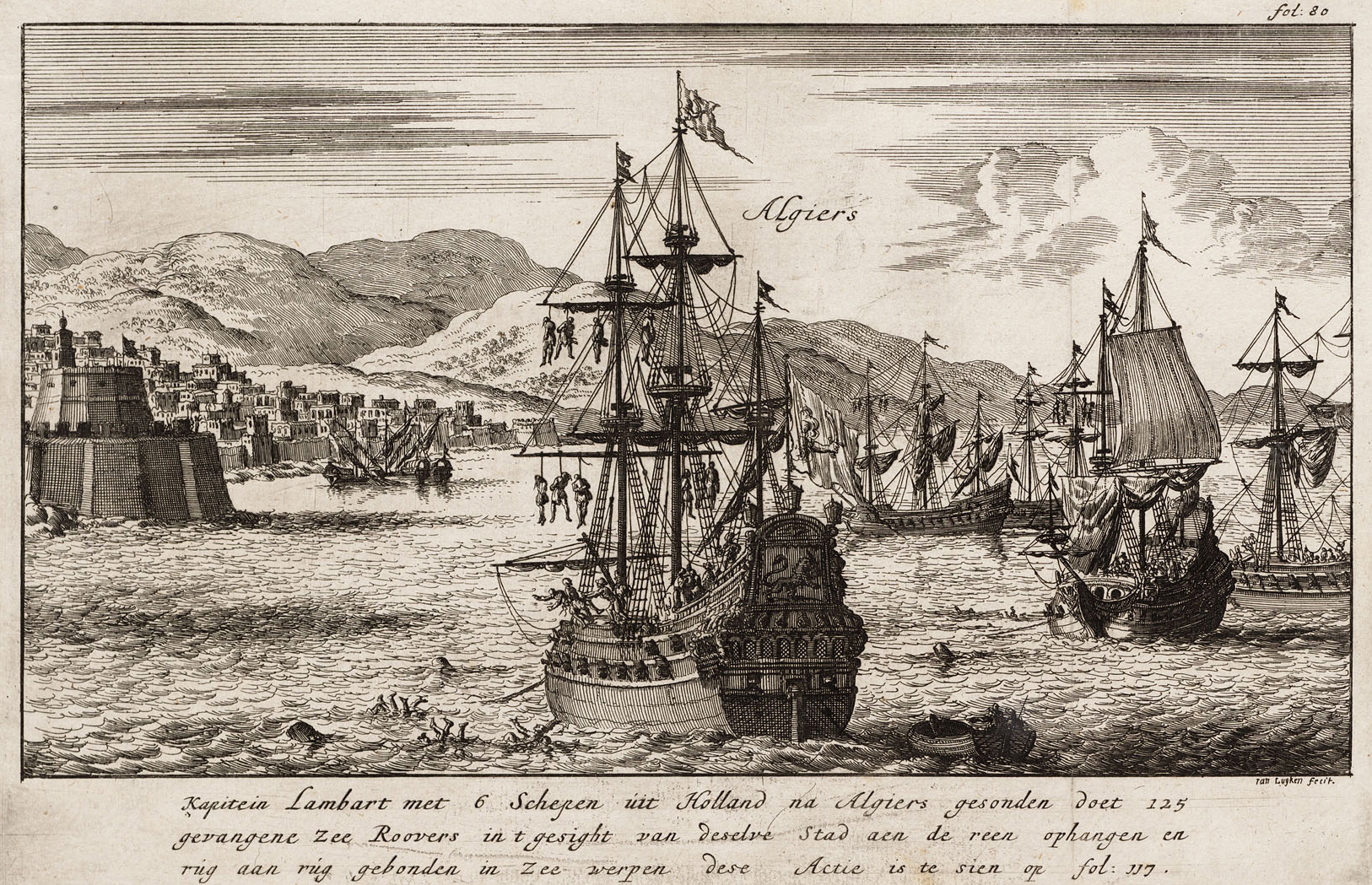
Lambert again throwing Algerians over board in the Expedition to Algiers (1624)

Immediately, Mooy Lambert and Hillebrand Quast were designated for action. Quast, in particular, proved successful in capturing a considerable number of North African ships. However, during his return journey, he once again confronted North African ships, disposing of each pirate mercilessly by throwing them overboard, and calling it footwashing. Meanwhile, Mooy Lambert was tasked with patrolling the Mediterranean and combating Algerian pirates, a mission that proved highly effective. While sailing through the Strait of Gibraltar, Lambert encountered a formidable Algerian fleet of 20–30 ships. A fierce battle ensued for two days, with Lambert emerging victorious and capturing 12–20 of the enemy's vessels. The remaining ships fled and, just like Captain Quast, Lambert disposed of their crew members by throwing them overboard.

Continuing their efforts against Algiers, the Algerians responded by imprisoning the Dutch ambassador, further escalating tensions. The Dutch, incensed by this action, intensified their war against Algiers and reinforced Lambert's fleet to secure the ambassador's release. The Algerians complied with the Dutch demands and freed the Ambassador. However, reluctant to engage in an all-out war with the Dutch Republic, Algiers proposed peace to the Dutch Republic in 1619. Despite the Prince of Orange's desire to continue the war and dismantle Algiers, the States General believed it wiser to pursue peace and accepted the truce. The truce was short-lived, as Algiers became the first to break it by attacking another ship, leading to further hostilities. Between 1619 and 1620, the Dutch captured two Algerian ships, while the Algerians captured a total of 82 Dutch vessels. Around 300 Dutch were enslaved in Algiers.

In response, the Dutch dispatched another fleet under Willem de Zoete, and advised all traders to sail under the protection of the Dutch Navy. A period of relative quiet followed, as both the Dutch and North Africans sought peace.

== Peace ==
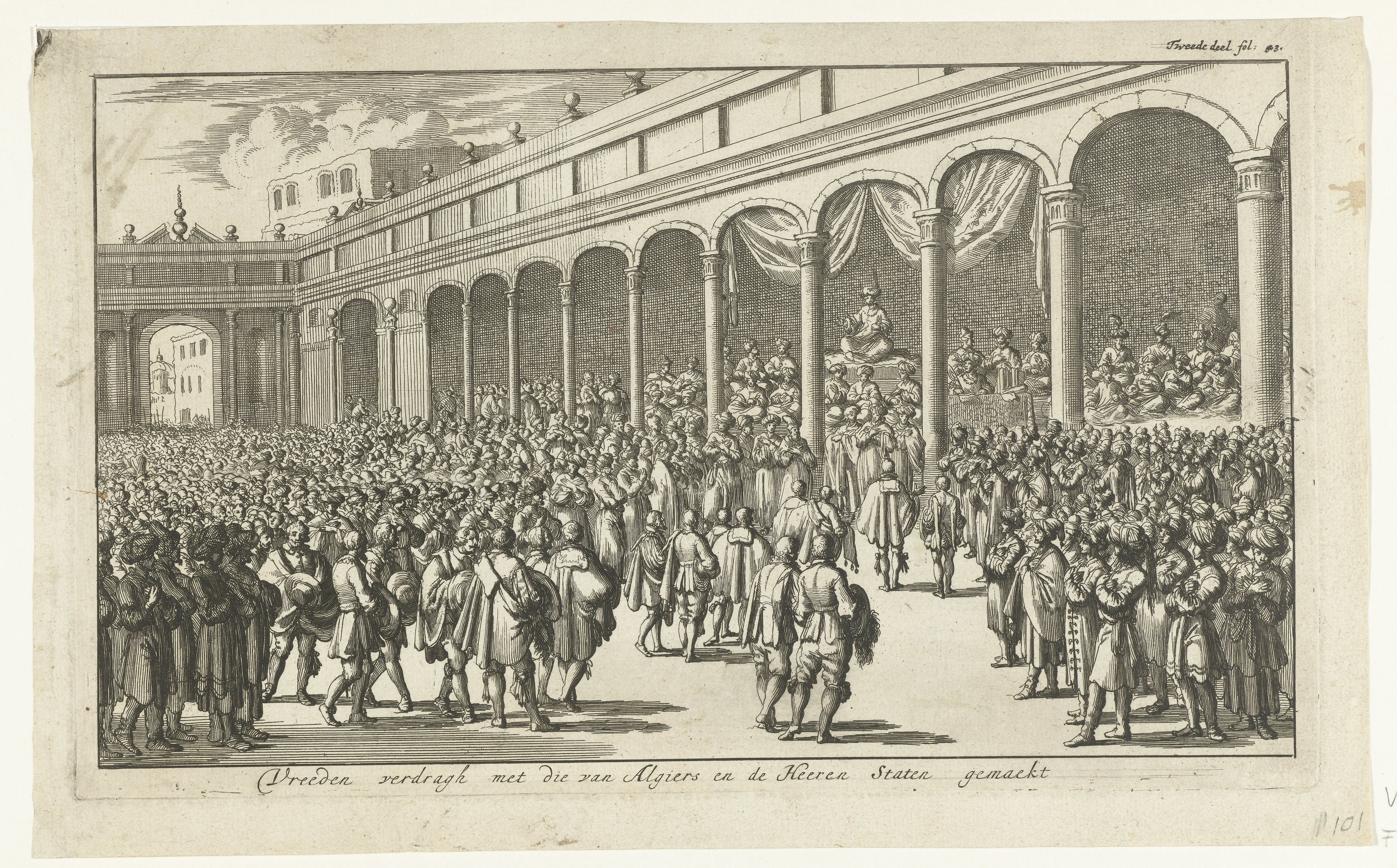
Peace with Algiers, and the Dutch in 1622

Despite the Prince of Orange's inclination to prolong the war, the States General of the Dutch Republic took a different approach, deeming it more prudent to seek peace with Algiers. The reason behind this decision stemmed from the upcoming expiration of the Twelve Years' Truce with Spain, which necessitated preserving every available ship for potential conflicts. Moreover, England had recently initiated an expedition against Algiers, prompting Algiers to seek reconciliation with the Dutch as well. In pursuit of peaceful resolution, the Dutch Republic dispatched a representative to negotiate with Algiers, leading to the successful conclusion of a treaty that favored the Dutch interests. In the same year they also did it with Tunis.

== Bibliography ==
- Bender, James (2014). Dutch Warships in the Age of Sail, 1600–1714 Design, Construction, Careers and Fates (E-book ed.). Pen & Sword Books. ISBN 9781473852877.
- Bulut, Mehmet (2001). Ottoman-Dutch Economic Relations in the Early Modern Period 1571-1699 (Paperback ed.). M. Bulut. p. 102. ISBN 9065506551.
- Heinsen-Roach, Erica (2019). Consuls and Captives Dutch-North African Diplomacy in the Early Modern Mediterranean (Hardcover ed.). University of Rochester Press. ISBN 9781580469746.
- Lunsford, V (2005). Piracy and Privateering in the Golden Age Netherlands (E-book ed.). Palgrave Macmillan. ISBN 9781403979384.
