= Willem de Zoete =

Dutch admiral

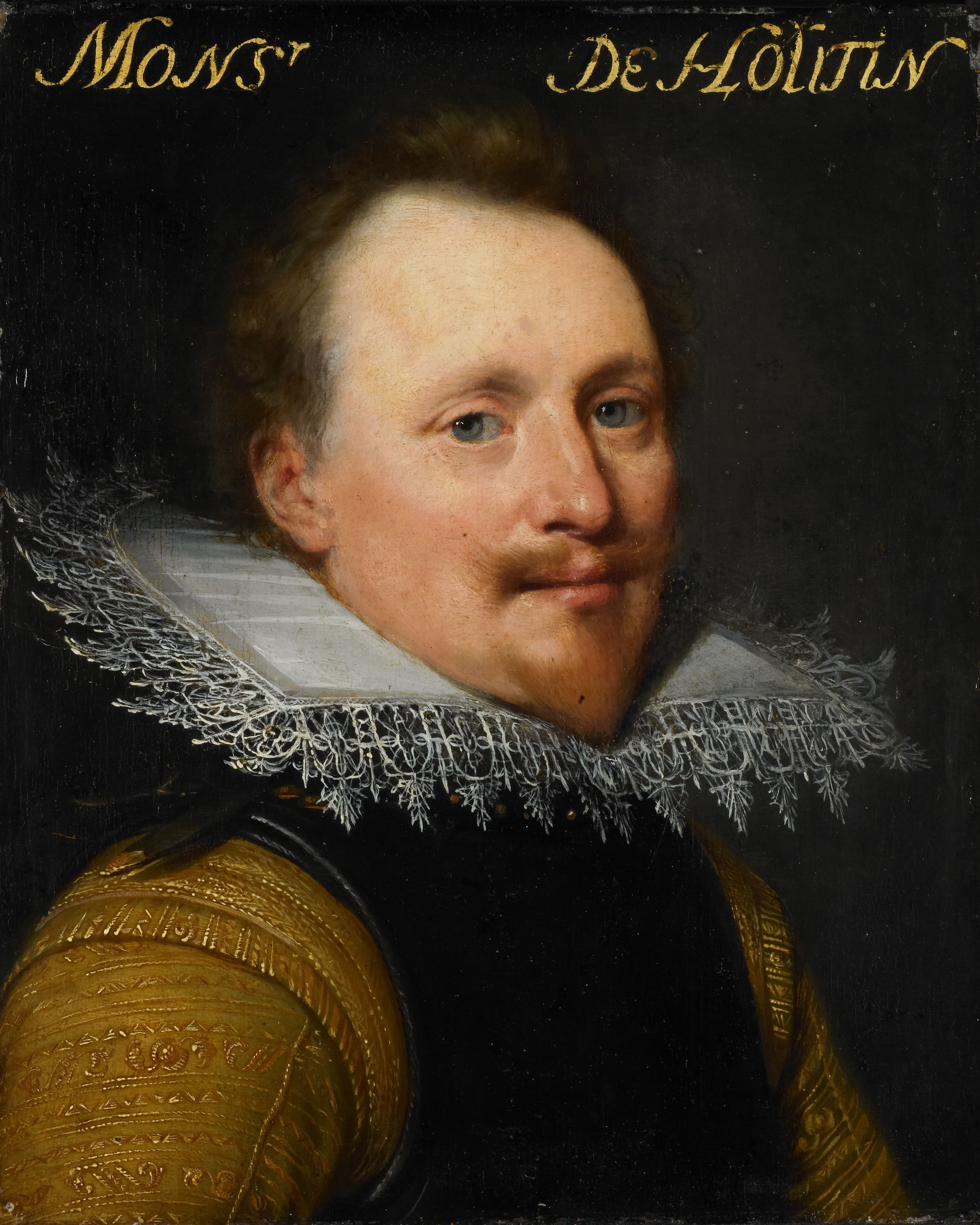
Portrait of De Zoete

Willem de Zoete, Heer van Haultain (1565 – 26 September 1637 in Sluis) was a Dutch admiral of the 17th century. He served as a lieutenant-admiral from 1601 to 1627.

== Biography ==
During the Eighty Years' War he directed Dutch fleets in various naval battles. In 1605, he destroyed a part of the Spanish convoy in the Dover Strait. In 1606, he was defeated at the Battle of Cape St. Vincent by Spanish Admiral Luis Fajardo. In 1621, he was also defeated by the Spanish in the Battle of Gibraltar. In 1622 he fought Dunkirkers on the coast of Scotland, and fought in the Dutch–Barbary war.

He led a Dutch fleet of 20 warships, supplied under the terms of the 1624 Franco-Dutch treaty, into the Siege of Saint-Martin-de-Ré against a Huguenot uprising. His fleet would be removed from French service in February 1626 after a resolution of the States-General in December 1625.
