= Mooy Lambert =

Dutch vice admiral

Lambert Hendriksz (c. 1550 – 17 March 1625) was a Dutch vice admiral. He is usually referred to by his nickname, Mooy Lambert ("Beautiful Lambert").

== Biography ==
Lambert served under Willem de Zoete and Jacob van Heemskerk, and was present as a rear admiral at the battle of Gibraltar. Lambert was active against the Dunkirk corsairs and in 1605 managed to defeat and capture the Dunkirk admiral Adriaan Dirksen.

From 1616 to 1624, Lambert was mostly active in the Mediterranean to protect Dutch merchants from the Barbary pirates, and fighting in the Dutch–Barbary war. In May 1618, he fought at Gibraltar against a Spanish fleet under Miguel de Vidazábal, in an ultimately inconclusive battle. In June of the same year, he teamed up with Vidazábal himself to defeat an Algerian corsair fleet, sinking or capturing half of the enemy ships. Lambert followed with a victory in July over another Algerian fleet.

In 1622, he negotiated a peace agreement with the Pasha of Algiers to leave Dutch merchant shipping unmolested. After this treaty was broken by the Algerians, Lambert was sent to take punitive action against the Barbary pirates and through harsh negotiations managed to force the Algerians to set hundreds of Christian slaves free.

After his death, having served the Admiralty of Rotterdam for over 40 years, Lambert was given a grave memorial in St. Laurens Church in Rotterdam.
