= Glenancross =

Coordinates: 56.95671°N 5.8423°W

Glenancross: Scottish Gaelic: Gleann nan Crois
- Location within the Lochaber area
- OS grid reference: NM664916
- Council area: Highland
- Country: Scotland
- Sovereign state: United Kingdom
- Post town: Mallaig
- Postcode district: PH39 4
- Police: Scotland
- Fire: Scottish
- Ambulance: Scottish

Glenancross is a settlement on the west coast of Scotland, overlooking the Sound of Sleat south of Mallaig, Lochaber, in the Scottish Highlands and is in the council area of Highland.

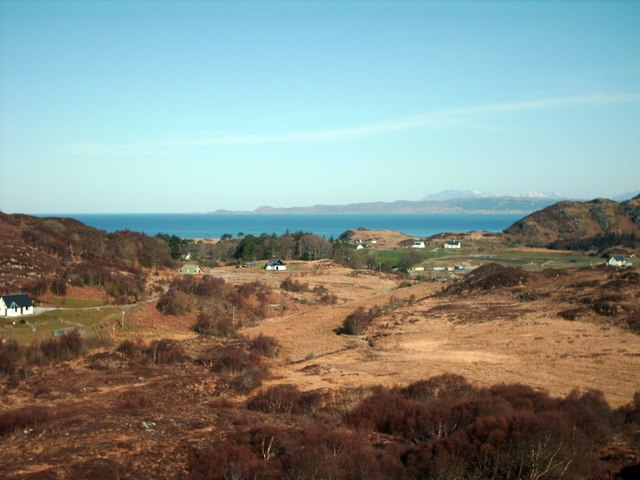
Glenancross
