= Giddy Green =

Hamlet in Dorset, England

Coordinates: 50°40′41″N 2°14′20″W

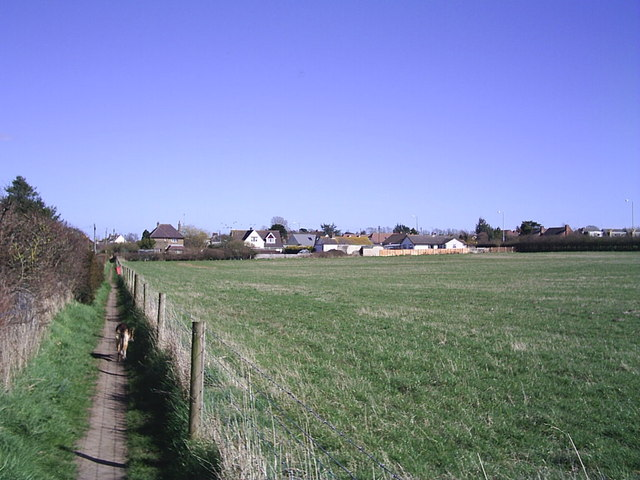
- Bailey's Drove from Giddy Green footpath

- Location within Dorset
- OS grid reference: SY831288
- Civil parish: Wool
- Unitary authority: Dorset
- Ceremonial county: Dorset
- Region: South West
- Country: England
- Sovereign state: United Kingdom
- Police: Dorset
- Fire: Dorset and Wiltshire
- Ambulance: South Western

Giddy Green is a small hamlet in the civil parish of Wool, in Dorset, England.
