= Battle of Gibraltar (1618) =

Coordinates: 35.915353°N 5.603746°W

- Part of Venetian-Habsburg conflicts
Date	24 June 1618
Location	Strait of Gibraltar
Result	Inconclusive

Belligerents
Spanish Empire	Republic of Venice

Commanders and leaders
(Spanish Empire) Miguel de Vidazábal	(Republic of Venice) Melchior van den Kerckhove

Strength
10 galleons 2 caravels	10 ships

Casualties and losses
70 killed or wounded	40 killed or wounded

The Battle of Gibraltar took place 24 June 1618 at the Strait of Gibraltar. It took place during the Venetian-Habsburg conflicts, when Spanish forces tried to block a Venetian and Dutch fleet from passing through the Strait, engaging only the Venetians in battle. The battle was ultimately inconclusive when the Spanish received order to let them pass.

== Background ==
The battle took place in a moment of indecision for the court of King Philip III, which was temporarily in peace with the Dutch Republic, but in turmoil with Venice due to the call of Viceroy of Naples Pedro Téllez-Girón, Duke of Osuna for military pressure against the Venetians. Osuna was engaging in an unofficial war of privateering against Venice, resulting in a clash in the Battle of Ragusa in November 1617, but the court alternated between supporting him and obstructing his actions.

A first Dutch mercenary fleet had been previously hired by Venice in 1617. Although Osuna was warned and given permission to intercept it, the order came too late and the fleet could not be caught neither in the strait of Gibraltar nor in the Adriatic, concluding in it arriving in Venice in April. In 1618, after Ragusa, another Dutch fleet was hired by Venice, which the Spanish found about before it crossed the strait. Miguel de Vidázabal's squad of 7 galleons for the guard of the strait was reinforced with two other galleons and three caravels and was ordered to intercept it.

== Battle ==
Vidazábal found 18 ships, eight of them belonging to the Dutch Republic, commanded by Mooy Lambert (although his full squadron consisted of 13 ships), while the other ten were Dutch ships flying Venetian colors, under the command of Melchior van den Kerckhove and carrying 6,500 mercenaries. When one of the Spanish caravels ordered them to stop, the Dutch ships obliged while the Venetian-owned ships rejected the order and prepared for war. With the Dutch remaining neutral and standing aside as per the Twelve Years Truce, the battle would be 10 Spanish ships on 10 Venetian ones.

The battle started on June 28, with both fleets exchanging artillery and musket fire until nightfall. They both stopped to avoid a night battle while intending to restart it on daybreak. However, by night Vidázabal received a message by Álvaro de Bazán y Benavides, Marquis of Santa Cruz warning him that the court had deemed the fleet free to pass. The battle ended with 40 dead and 30 wounded on the Spanish side, with the casualties in the opposing force remaining unknown but esteemed to be much greater due to all the troops they carried and the artillery they had been hit with.

== Aftermath ==
Only eight days after the battle, an armada from the Regency of Algiers tried to pass the Strait as well, but Vidazábal chased them, making many of the Argelian ships run aground and be set in fire. Vidazábal would die shortly after of a seizure.

== Bibliography ==
- Beverwijck, Johan Van (1640). "Joh. van Beverwyck Spaensche Xerxes, ofte Beschrijvinge, ende Vergelijckinge van des Scheep-strijdt tusschen de groote Koningen van Persen, ende Spaengjen, teghen de verbonde Griecken en Nederlanders". Google Books (in Dutch).
- Fernández, Ó.A.R. (2019). England and Spain in the Early Modern Era: Royal Love, Diplomacy, Trade and Naval Relations 1604-25. Bloomsbury Publishing. ISBN 978-1-350-13343-3.
- Fernández Duro, Cesáreo (1903). Armada española desde la unión de los reinos de Castilla y Aragón. Sucesores de Rivadeneyra.
- Linde de Castro, Luis (2024). Don Pedro Girón, duque de Osuna: la hegemonía española en Europa a comienzos del siglo XVII. Encuentro. ISBN 9788413392011.
