= Giggs =

Giggs may refer to:

== People ==
- Margaret Giggs (1508–1570), otherwise Margaret Clement, adopted daughter of Sir Thomas More
- Rebecca Giggs, Australian nonfiction writer
- Ryan Giggs (b. 1973), retired Welsh footballer
- Giggs (rapper) (b. 1983), English rapper

== Places ==
- Giggs Hill Green, an area of common ground in Thames Ditton, England

== See also ==
- Gigg (disambiguation)
