= Gibraltar, Washington =

Unincorporated community in Washington, United States

- Unincorporated community
- Location within Washington (state)
- Coordinates: 48°25′50″N 122°34′58″W
- Country: United States
- State: Washington
- County: Skagit
- Elevation: 141 ft (43 m)
- Time zone: UTC-8 (Pacific (PST))
  - Summer (DST): UTC-7 (PDT)
- Area code(s): 360, 564
- GNIS feature ID: 1510987

Gibraltar (also Gibralter) is an unincorporated community in Skagit County, Washington, United States. The community lies on the west shore of Similk Bay.
