= Gibraltar rock (candy) =

Type of candy

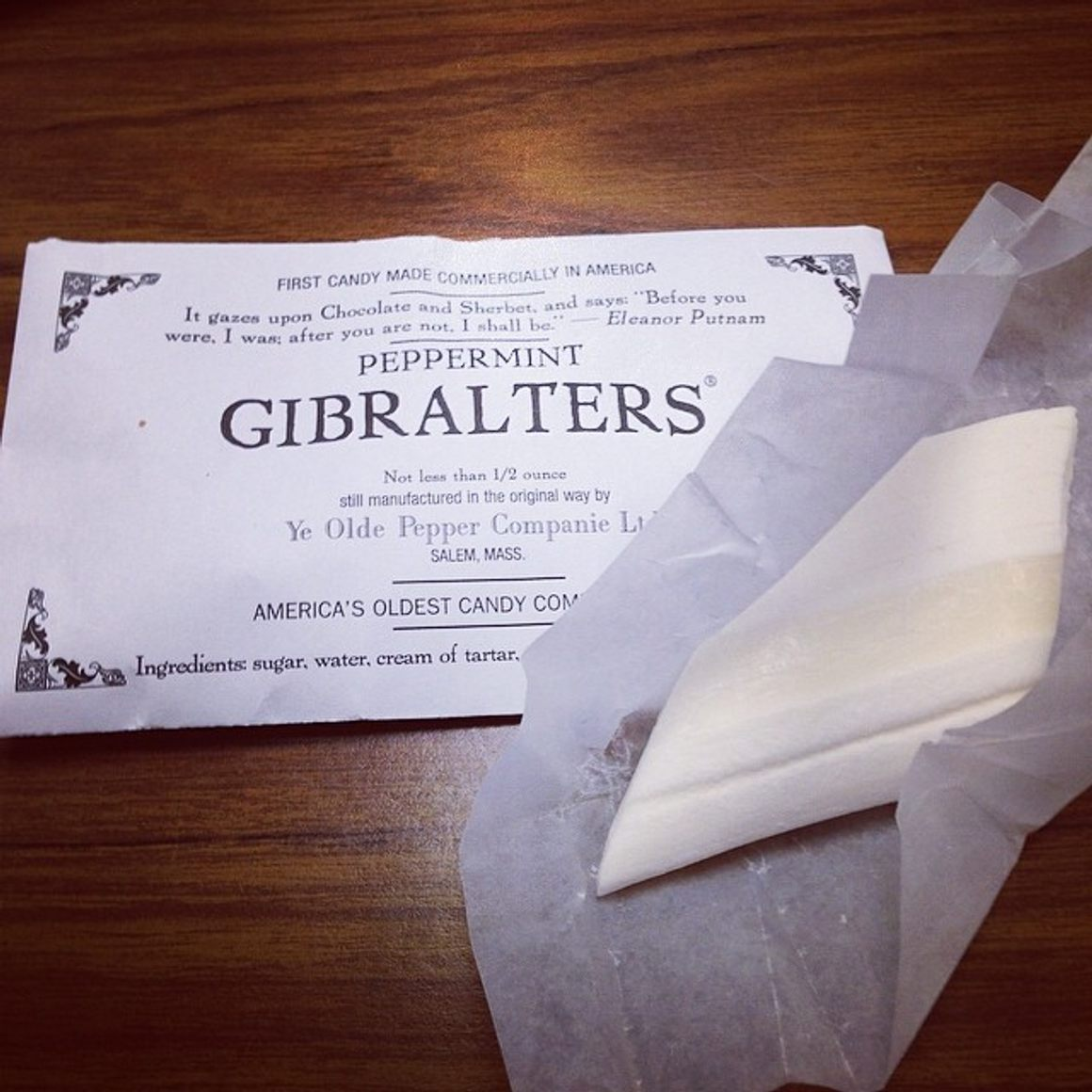
- Alternative names: Gibraltars
- Type: Confectionery
- Place of origin: United States
- Region or state: Salem, Massachusetts
- Main ingredients: Sugar, water, flavoring (vanilla, peppermint, cloves, or lemon)

Gibraltar rock, Gibraltars, or Salem Gibralter is an old-fashioned hard candy associated with Salem, Massachusetts. It was the first candy manufactured commercially in the United States, and is still being sold as of 2025. It is one of several sorts of confectionery known as "rock"; the name alludes to its hardness, likening it to the landmark at the tip of Europe, the Rock of Gibraltar.

== History ==
Gibraltar rock was originated by the Spencer family in 1806, when they emigrated from England to Salem. A shipwreck left them destitute; their new neighbors donated supplies, including a barrel of sugar in recognition of the skills of Mrs. Spencer as a confectioner. She sold her lemon or peppermint flavored hard candy on the steps of the First Church, until they became so popular that she was able to purchase a horse and wagon to sell them to neighboring towns.

According to a 1947 cookbook, Salem native Nathaniel Hawthorne wrote of the candy having

been made by an Englishman named Spencer around 1822 and were sold by his mother, who drove a wagon from street to street. Their retail price was a silver penny apiece or four pence, half penny for seven.

As hard candy remains stable indefinitely if kept dry, captains of commercial ships could carry the candy to ports throughout the world for sale.

After Mrs. Spencer died, the business remained in family hands until the 1830s, when it was sold to John William Pepper.

== Recipe ==
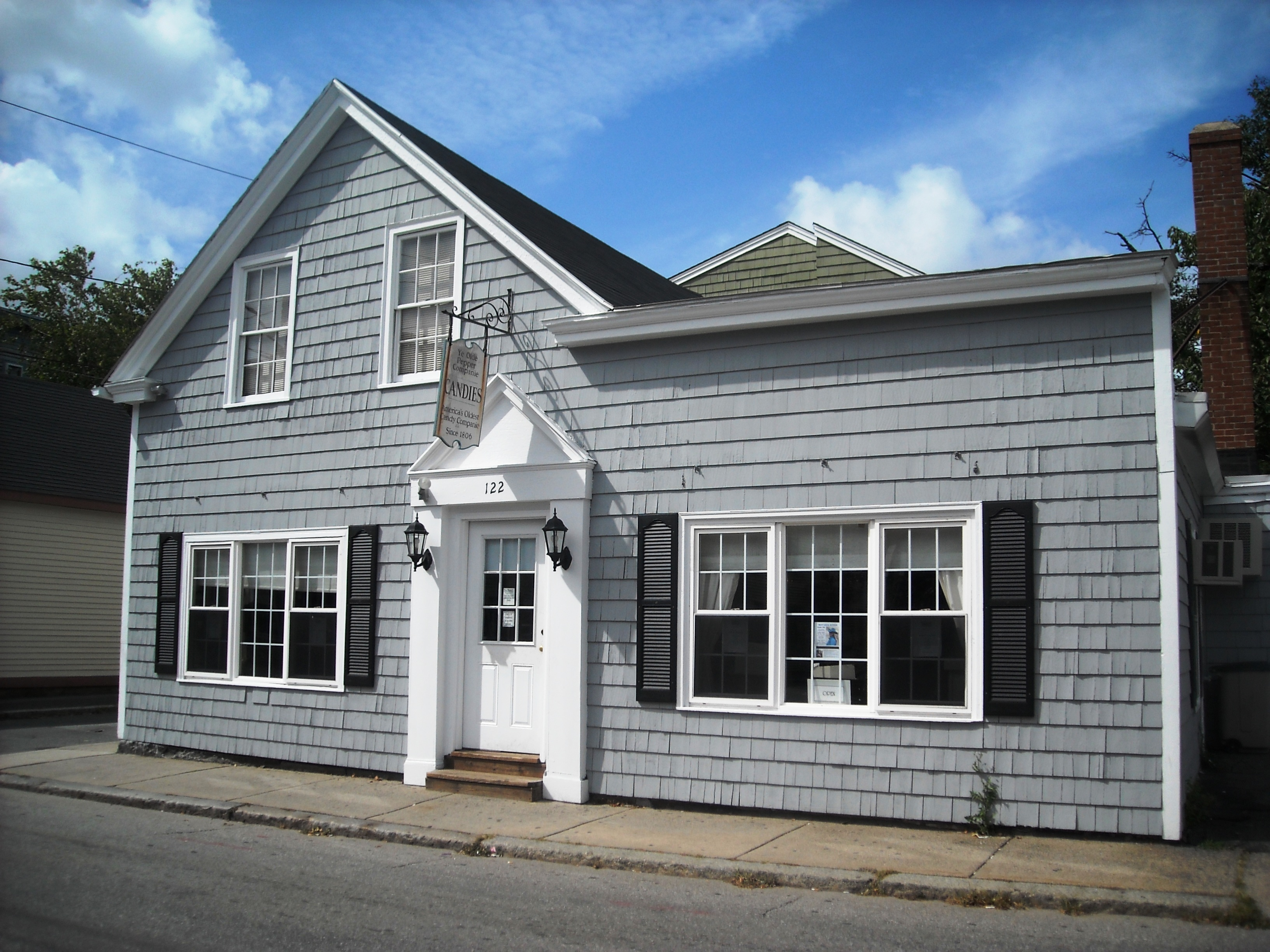
Ye Olde Pepper Companie, original shop, Salem

Ye Olde Pepper Companie continues to sell the candies, apparently using the original recipe as "Gibralters" [sic] and lists sugar, water, cream of tartar, cornstarch, and oil of lemon as ingredients. They are cut into the shape of a rhombus about 1½ inches on a side.

A 1947 cookbook gives a recipe using sugar, water, vinegar, and either vanilla, peppermint or cloves for flavoring; it is boiled until hard then pulled like taffy, and becomes "soft and creamy" in several days.

== Literary footprint ==
An 1893 book of sketches about "Old Salem" calls Gibraltars, and molasses "black-jacks", "two Salem institutions", and says

The Gibraltar... is a white and delicate candy, flavored with lemon or peppermint, soft as cream at one stage of its existence, but capable of hardening into a consistency so stony and so unutterably flinty-hearted that it is almost a libel upon the rock whose name it bears. The Gibraltar is the aristocrat of Salem confectionery. It gazes upon chocolate and sherbet and says:—"Before you were, I was. After you are not, I shall be."

Author Harriet Bates (pen name Eleanor Putnam), who lived there in childhood from 1865-1871, recalls the lemon flavor being preferred by youth, and the peppermint by the elderly. She quotes a "charming old Salem dame" as saying "I know I must be growing old, because a peppermint Gibraltar is so comforting to me."

Gibraltar candies are mentioned in Nathaniel Hawthorne's novel The House of the Seven Gables, published in 1851. In the book, a character named Hepzibah Pyncheon operates a little "cent-shop" which contained "a glass pickle-jar, filled with fragments of Gibraltar rock; not, indeed, splinters of the veritable stone foundation of the famous fortress, but bits of delectable candy, neatly done up in white paper." His story "The Old Apple-Dealer", collected in Mosses from an Old Manse, similarly mentions "that delectable condiment, known by children as Gibraltar rock."

Also in 1851, British travel writer Samuel Sidney mentioned the candy in his description of the early morning scene at Euston Station, then "the greatest railway port in England, or indeed in the world". Passengers began to gather for the Parliamentary train, the cheapest conveyance of the day: "Children are very plentiful, and the mothers are accompanied with large escorts of female relations, who keep kissing and stuffing the children with real Gibraltar rock and gingerbread to the last moment."
