= Glororum =

Coordinates: 55.5948°N 1.7397°W

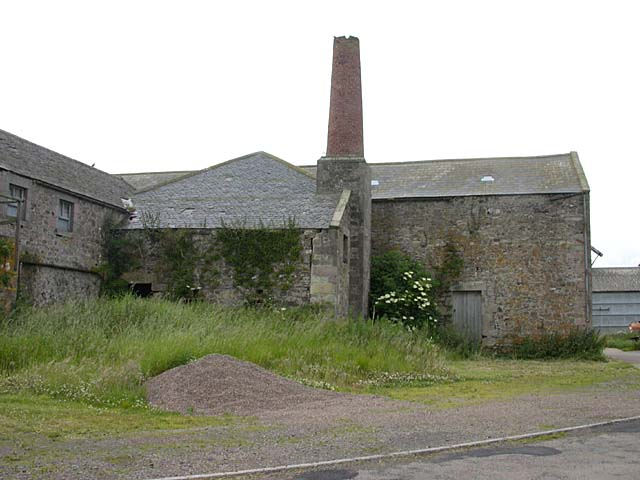
- Engine house at Glororum (2003)

- Location within Northumberland
- OS grid reference: NU165335
- Civil parish: Bamburgh
- Unitary authority: Northumberland
- Ceremonial county: Northumberland
- Region: North East
- Country: England
- Sovereign state: United Kingdom
- Post town: BAMBURGH
- Postcode district: NE69
- Dialling code: 01668
- Police: Northumbria
- Fire: Northumberland
- Ambulance: North East
- UK Parliament: Berwick-upon-Tweed

Glororum is a hamlet and former civil parish, now in the parish of Bamburgh in the county of Northumberland, England, about 1.25 miles (2.01 km) south west of Bamburgh. In 1951 the parish had a population of 13.

== History ==
Bamburgh parish records of baptisms for 1768 show this hamlet with the name of Gloweroerum.

The name is claimed to come from old English to 'Glower o'er them' or to look over them. This is believed to be due to the fact that there was an old fort on the site of the farm which looked over Bamburgh Castle whilst it was seat to the king of Northumberland.

Prior to re-development in 2010-2012 there were substantial farm buildings on the crossroads. Although the farm buildings have now been converted into luxury "Barn conversion" type residences including detached and terrace cottages and larger terraced houses, Glororum is still a working farm run by the Dryden family since 1883.

To the north-east of the hamlet there is a large holiday park comprising mainly large static caravans. The caravan Park was established in 1953 with 10 caravans and has grown over the years to the size it is now.

== Governance ==
Glororum is in the parliamentary constituency of Berwick-upon-Tweed. Glororum was formerly a township in Bambrough parish, from 1866 Glororum was a civil parish in its own right until it was abolished on 1 April 1955 and merged with Bamburgh.
