= Gibraltar, Buckinghamshire =

Hamlet in Buckinghamshire, England

Coordinates: 51.7917°N 0.9022°W

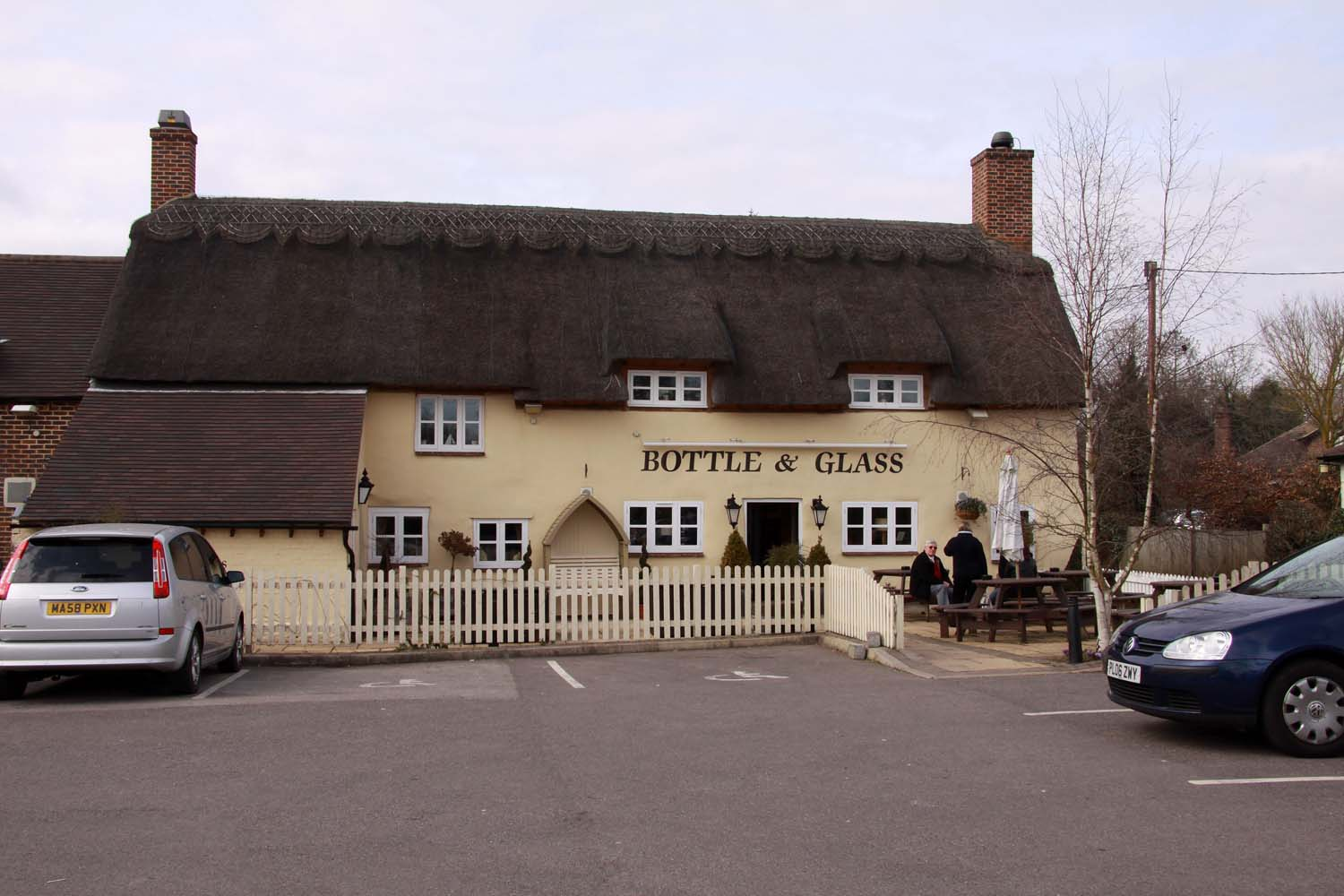
The Bottle and Glass

Gibraltar is a hamlet in the parish of Dinton-with-Ford and Upton in Buckinghamshire, England. It is located on the modern main road that links Aylesbury with Thame.

The hamlet is named after the British Overseas Territory of Gibraltar.

In 2003, the public house in Gibraltar, called the Bottle and Glass, was gutted when the thatch of the pub roof caught fire following an electrical fault in the upper storey of the building. Following extensive rebuilding the Bottle and Glass reopened on 27 April 2007.
