= Gigg, Greater Manchester =

Coordinates: 53.5831°N 2.2945°W

Gigg
- Location within Greater Manchester
- Metropolitan borough: Bury
- Metropolitan county: Greater Manchester
- Region: North West
- Country: England
- Sovereign state: United Kingdom
- Post town: BURY
- Postcode district: BL9
- Dialling code: 0161
- Police: Greater Manchester
- Fire: Greater Manchester
- Ambulance: North West
- UK Parliament: Bury North

Gigg is a suburban area of Bury, a town in Greater Manchester, England.

It is possibly best known for the football ground of Bury F.C., which is situated in, and named after, the area, Gigg Lane.
