= List of wars in the Low Countries until 1560 =

The Low Countries in 1560. Habsburg Netherlands Prince-Bishopric of Liège Principality of Stavelot-Malmedy Prince-Bishopric of Cambrésis

This is a list of wars that occurred in the Low Countries until 1560.

- For subsequent wars in the north, see List of wars involving the Dutch Republic (1560–1795) and List of wars involving the Netherlands (1795–present).
- For subsequent wars in the south, see
  - List of wars in the southern Low Countries (1560–1829)
  - List of wars involving Belgium (1830–present)
  - List of wars involving Luxembourg (1890–present).

== List ==
Start	Finish	Name of conflict	Belligerents		Outcome
Start	Finish	Name of conflict	Combatant 1	Combatant 2	Outcome
58 BCE	50 BCE	Gallic Wars	Roman Republic	Gallic tribes Germanic tribes Celtic Britons; Iberian tribes	Decisive Roman victory: Roman Republic annexes Gaul and Belgica
54 BCE	53 BCE	Ambiorix's revolt (part of the Gallic Wars)	Roman Republic	Eburones	Roman victory: Rebellion suppressed
12 BCE	16 CE	Roman campaigns in Germania (12 BC – AD 16) (including the Battle of the Teutoburg Forest)	Roman Empire	Germanic tribes	Strategic Germanic victory: Roman withdrawal
28	28	Battle of Baduhenna Wood	Roman Empire	Frisii	Indecisive; tactical Frisian victory: Roman withdrawal
47	47	Gannascus' revolt	Roman Empire	Cananefates; Chauci; Frisii	Roman victory: Germanic revolt/invasion defeated; Temporary Roman occupation of Frisia
69	70	Revolt of the Batavi	Roman Empire	Batavi; Cananefates; Frisii; Lingones; Treveri	Roman victory: Rebellion suppressed
286	296	Carausian Revolt	Roman Empire	Carausius; Franks	Roman victory: Rebellion suppressed; Franks (temporarily?) occupy the lands between the Rhine and Waal rivers, and between the mouths of the Rhine and Scheldt
c.445	c.450	Frankish conquest of Turnacum and Cameracum	Roman Empire	Salian Franks	Frankish victory: Turnacum and Cameracum become Frankish capitals
448	448	Battle of Vicus Helena	Roman Empire	Salian Franks	Roman victory
c.450	c.450	Battle of Finnsburg?	Frisii	Danes	Danish victory
c.525	c.525	Battle on the Rhine?	Frankish Empire; Frisii?	Danes	Frankish victory
600	793	Frisian–Frankish wars	Frankish Empire	Frisian Kingdom	Frankish victory: Frisian Kingdom annexed
715	718	Frankish Civil War (715–718)	Carolingian faction (Austrasian); Charles Martel; Chlothar IV (717–718) Pippinid faction (Austrasian); Theudoald (715–717); Plectrude (715–717)	Neustrian faction Ragenfrid; Dagobert III (†715); Chilperic II; Redbad of Frisia (716–718); Odo of Aquitaine (independent until 718)	Carolingian victory: Neustrians defeat Pippinids (715); Charles subjects Pippinids, enthrones Chlothar (717); Carolingians defeat Neustrians (718); Chlothar dies, Charles recognises Chilperic as king but gains de facto power as palace mayor, establishing the Carolingian dynasty (718)
772	804	Saxon Wars	Frankish Empire; Obotrite Confederacy	Saxons; Frisians	Frankish victory: Saxons and Frisians subdued
834	891	Viking raids in the Rhineland	Vikings	Frankish Empire, splitting into: West Francia; Middle Francia/Lotharingia; East Francia	Frankish victory: Viking devastation of cities such as Dorestad; Count Henry defeated most Vikings by 885; The Battle of Leuven (891) expelled the remaining Vikings
978	980	Franco-German war of 978–980	Holy Roman Empire Lower lorraine	West Francia	Status quo ante bellum
987	991	Charles-Hugh Capet war	Lower Lotharingia	Kingdom of France	French victory
1012	1018	Lower Lorrainian war of succession	County of Verdun; Prince-Bishopric of Liège	County of Leuven & Brussels; County of Namur; County of Hainaut; County of Flanders County of Holland County of Luxemburg	Verdun victory: Battle of Florennes (1015); Godfrey of Verdun becomes Duke of Lower Lorraine; Henry of Leuven recognises Godfrey in 1018
1018	1018	Battle of Vlaardingen	West Frisia (later County of Holland)	Holy Roman Empire Lower Lorraine	West Frisian victory: West Frisia obtains de facto autonomy
1037	1037	Odo II invasion of Lotharingia	County of Champagne	Lower and Upper Lotharingia under Gothelo I Holy Roman Empire Kingdom of Burgundy	●Battle of Bar-le-Duc : death of Odo ●Holy Roman Empire victory
1044	1056	Revolts of Godfrey the Bearded	Upper Lorraine; Pro-Godfrey Lower Lorraine; County of Flanders; County of Leuven & Brussels	Holy Roman Empire; Pro-Gothelo II Lower Lorraine; Pro-Frederick Lower Lorraine; Bishopric of Metz	Compromise: Godfrey banished to Tuscany (1057); Godfrey succeeds Frederick in Lower Lorraine (1065)
1070	1071	War of the Flemish succession (1070–1071)	Pro-Robert Flanders; West Frisia (later County of Holland)	Pro-Arnulf Flanders; Kingdom of France; County of Hainaut; County of Boulogne; Duchy of Normandy	West Frisian victory: Robert the Frisian becomes Count of Flanders
1076	1076	Battle of IJsselmonde	West Frisia (later County of Holland) County of Flanders	Prince-Bishopric of Utrecht Lower Lotharingia	West Frisian victory: Count Dirk V regainds West Frisia from Utrecht
1101	1115	Wars of Henry of Lower Lorraine	Pro Henry Lower Lotharingia Holy Roman empire (1104-1106)	Pro Godfrey Lower Lotharingia Holy Roman empire (1101-1104 and 1006-1115)	Godfrey I, Count of Louvain remain Duke of Lower Lotharingia and Henry became count of Limburg
1102	1105	German-Flemish war	County of Flanders	Holy Roman Empire Duchy of Lower Lotharingia	Status quo ante bellum
1127	1128	War of the Flemish succession (1127–1128)	Pro-William Clito Flanders Lower Lotharingia	Pro-Theoderic of Alsace Flanders	Theoderican victory: William Clito died of wounds, ending the war
1128	1131	Godfrey-Waleran war	Pro Godfrey Lower Lotharingia	Pro Waleran Lower Lotharingia	•Battle of Wilderen : Waleran victory•Waleran became duke of Lower Lotharingia •Godfrey renonce his title and went to the abbey of Affligem
1132	1297	West Frisian Wars	County of Holland	West Frisians	Hollandic victory: Holland conquers the region of West Friesland
1139	1140	Rebellion of Henry II of Limburg	Pro Henry Lower Lotharingia	Pro Godfrey Lower Lotharingia	•Godfrey victory, he remain duke of Lower lotharingia
1139	1159	Grimbergen Wars	County of Leuven & Brussels	House of Berthout	Leuven victory: Leuven acquires the Lordship of Grimbergen
1142	1142	Limburg-Fauquemont war	County of Limburg	Lordship of Fauquemont	Limburg victory
1165	1323	Flemish–Hollandic conflict over Zeeland Bewestenschelde	County of Flanders	County of Holland	Hollandic victory: Treaty of Paris (1323): Holland acquires Zeeland Bewestenschelde
1182	1194	War of Lembeek [fr]	Lower Lotharingia	County of Hainaut County of Luxembourg County of Namur County of Flanders	Compromise : Battle of Noville Treaty of Hal
1186	1263/5	War of the Namurois–Luxemburgish succession	House of Namur (Ermesinde); Limburg-Luxemburg dynasty County of Namur (contested); County of Luxemburg (contested until 1199)	House of Flanders (Baldwins); County of Hainaut; County of Namur (contested); County of Flanders	Compromise: Ermesinde and her offspring inherited Luxemburg (1199); Namur sold to Guy of Dampierre (1263/5)
1202	1378	Liégeois–Brabantian Wars	Prince-Bishopric of Liège; County of Loon	Duchy of Brabant; Dual Lordship of Maastricht	Compromise: Truce of Booienhoven: Liège acquires Moha and Loon; Brabant acquires Limburg and Overmaas; Dual Lordship of Maastricht confirmed
1203	1206	Loon War	Ada and Louis II; County of Loon; Supported by: Kingdom of France; Staufen; County of Flanders; Duchy of Brabant; Duchy of Limburg; Utrecht; Liège	William; County of Holland; Supported by: Kingdom of England; House of Welf	Military and long-term political victory for William: William recognised as count of Holland
1212	1213	War of the Moha succession (part of the Liégeois–Brabantian Wars)	Duchy of Brabant	Prince-Bishopric of Liège	Liégeois victory: Moha annexed by Liège
1213	1214	Anglo-French War (1213–1214)	Kingdom of France; Duchy of Burgundy; County of Champagne; County of Dreux; County of Ponthieu; County of Saint-Pol; Duchy of Normandy; Duchy of Bretagne; Prince-Bishopric of Liège	Angevin Empire (England, Anjou, Normandy, Aquitaine); Holy Roman Empire; Flanders-Namur; County of Boulogne; Hainaut-Holland; Brabant-Leuven; Duchy of Lorraine; Duchy of Limburg; Duchy of Saxony; Palatinate	French victory: Truce of Chinon; Collapse of the Angevin Empire
1225	1227	Drenthe–Groningen war	Burgraviate of Groningen; Bishopric of Utrecht	Burgraviate of Coevorden ("Drenthe"); Gelkingen	Drenther victory: Utrecht bishop dies in battle, new bishop proclaims crusade
1228	1232	Drenther Crusade	Bishopric of Utrecht; Frisian crusaders	Burgraviate of Coevorden ("Drenthe"); Ommelander rebels	Inconclusive: Drenthe retains de facto independence from Utrecht
1226/8	1231/2	War of the Succession of Breda			
1244	1254	War of the Flemish Succession	House of Flanders; House of Dampierre; Supported by: Anjou (3rd conflict)	House of Avesnes; Supported by: Holland (2nd conflict); Zeeland (2nd conflict)	Compromise: Dampierre obtains Flanders; Avesnes obtains Hainaut
1245/50	1273/5	Great Interregnum	Hohenstaufen party: Frederick II (1245–50); Conrad IV (1245–54); Alfonso X of Castile (1257–75); Rudolf of Habsburg (1273–5)	Welf party: Henry of Thuringia (1246–7); William II of Holland (1247–56); Richard of Cornwall (1257–72); Ottokar II of Bohemia	Compromise: Unanimous election of Rudolf of Habsburg in 1273; Alfonso X of Castile renounced claim in 1275
1256	1422	Friso-Hollandic Wars	County of Holland	Upstalsboom League; Various other Frisian factions	Holland conquers West Frisia, but makes no substantial gains in Middle Frisia
1272	1278	War of the Cow	Prince-Bishopric of Liège	County of Namur	Indecisive: Status quo ante bellum
1283	1289	War of the Limburg Succession	Duchy of Brabant; County of Loon; City of Cologne	County of Guelders; County of Luxemburg; Electorate of Cologne	Brabantian victory: Brabant acquires the Duchy of Limburg
1296	1335	Awans and Waroux War	Awans	Waroux	Stalemate: Status quo ante bellum
1297	1305	Franco-Flemish War	Kingdom of France; Flemish patricians	County of Flanders; County of Namur	French victory: Flanders cedes Lille, Douai, Bethune and Orchies to France; Flanders remains independent
1303	1306	Brussels Revolt	Brabantian artisan guilds	Brabantian patrician class Duke of Brabant	Patrician–ducal victory: Rebellion suppressed
1322	1326	Bredevoorter Feud	Prince-Bishopric of Münster	County of Guelders	Compromise: Peace of Wesel: Guelders acquires the Lordship of Bredevoort; Münster acquires the Lordship of Bermentfelde (in Borken)
1323	1328	Peasant revolt in Flanders 1323–1328	Kingdom of France; Flemish count and loyalists	Flemish rebels	French victory: Restoration of pro-French count; Repression of all who participated in the revolt
1336	1366	Wars of the Loon Succession (part of the Liégeois–Brabantian Wars)	County of Loon; Supported by: Duchy of Brabant (1337–1363); Duchy of Luxemburg (1361–1366)	Prince-Bishopric of Liège; Supported by: Avignon Papacy	Liégeois victory: Annexation of Loon by Liège; Annexation of Chiny by Luxemburg
1337	1453	Hundred Years' War	Valois France; Duchy of Burgundy (1337–1419, 35–53); Kingdom of Scotland; Crown of Castile; Republic of Genoa; Kingdom of Bohemia; Crown of Aragon; Avignon Papacy	Plantagenet France; Kingdom of England; Duchy of Burgundy (1419–35); Kingdom of Portugal; Kingdom of Navarre; County of Flanders; County of Hainaut; Papal States	Valois victory: England permanently loses all lands in France except Calais; Valois-Burgundy becomes semi-independent state (1363); Burgundy starts gradual acquisition of Low Countries (1384); Flanders remains under French suzerainty (1453)
1350	1361	Guelderian Fratricidal War	Reginald III, Duke of Guelders; Heeckeren faction	Edward, Duke of Guelders; Bronckhorst faction	Edwardian victory: Edward becomes duke of Guelders
1350	1490	Hook and Cod wars	Hook league (anti-Burgundy)	Cod league (pro-Burgundy)	Cod victory: Holland remains in Burgundian hands
1352	1365	War of the Valkenburg succession	Reginald of Schönforst Duchy of Brabant (1364–1365)	Waleran of Valkenburg	Brabantian victory: Brabant inherited Valkenburg in 1378
1356	1357	War of the Brabantian Succession	Duchy of Brabant; Duchy of Limburg; Lordship of Mechelen; Duchy of Luxemburg	County of Flanders; County of Namur (Jun. '56–Feb. '57) Duchy of Guelders; County of Zutphen	Flemish–Guelderian victory: Joanna recognised as duchess of Brabant; Flanders and Guelders acquire some Brabantian lands
1364	1368	First war of Guelders	Duchy of Brabant; Heeckeren faction County of Holland; County of Hainaut	Duchy of Guelders; Bronckhorst faction County of Zutphen; Bishopric of Utrecht	Military stalemate, diplomatic Brabantian victory: Brabant regains county of Megen
1371	1371	Battle of Baesweiler	Duchy of Jülich; Duchy of Guelders; County of Zutphen	Duchy of Brabant; County of Namur; County of Ligny	Jülich–Guelderian victory: Duke of Brabant and Count of Namur captured; Duke of Guelders and Count of Ligny killed
1371	1379	First War of the Guelderian Succession	Duchy of Jülich; Bronckhorst faction	Blois; Heeckeren faction	Jülich victory: William of Jülich recognised as duke of Guelders
1379	1385	Revolt of Ghent (1379–1385) (part of the Hundred Years' War)	Kingdom of France; County of Flanders; Duchy of Burgundy (1384–5)	Ghent rebels Kingdom of England (1383–5)	Franco–Burgundian victory: Peace of Tournai; Ghent recognises royal and comital authority; Ghent is granted amnesty
1382	1383	Despenser's Crusade (part of the Hundred Years' War, Revolt of Ghent and Western Schism)	Kingdom of France; County of Flanders; Avignon Papacy	Kingdom of England; Ghent rebels Papal States	Truce: English withdrawal
1385	1390	Second war of Guelders	Duchy of Brabant; Duchy of Limburg; Duchy of Burgundy; Kingdom of France	Duchy of Guelders; County of Zutphen; Land of Cuijk; Duchy of Jülich	Guelderian victory: Land of Cuijk acquired by Guelders
1397	1399	Third war of Guelders	Duchy of Brabant; Prince-Bishopric of Liège (1397–98)	Duchy of Guelders; Duchy of Jülich	Peace of Ravenstein, 15 August 1399
1401	1412	Arkel Wars	County of Holland; Gorinchem (1406–7)	Land van Arkel; Duchy of Guelders (1409–12)	Hollandic victory: Arkel sold to Holland; Arkel later divided between Holland and Guelders
1413	1422	Great Frisian War	Vetkopers	Schieringers	Stalemate: Status quo ante bellum treaty
1423	1449	Utrecht Schism	Pro-Rudolf Utrecht; Lichtenbergers; Hook league Proysen; Papal States (1432–1449)	Anti-Rudolf Utrecht; Lokhorsten; Cod league Duchy of Burgundy; Duchy of Guelders (1423–29); Papal States (1423–32); Council of Basel (1431–49); Antipope Felix V (1439–49)	Lichtenberger victory: Rudolf militarily defeats Guelders (1429); Pope Martin V and Zweder van Culemborg die (1431/3); Pope Eugenius IV recognises Rudolf (1432); Council of Basel dissolves, Antipope steps down (1449); Walraven van Meurs renounces claims (1449); Rudolf recognised as Prince-Bishop of Utrecht
1438	1441	Dutch–Hanseatic War (part of the Sound Wars)	Duchy of Burgundy; Burgundian Netherlands	Hanseatic League; Lüneburg; Mecklenburg; Pomerania; Holstein; Brandenburg	Stalemate; compromise: Treaty of Copenhagen (1441)
1442	1446	Hollandic–Bremer war	County of Holland; County of Zeeland; County of Flanders; Frisian lands	Bremen	Peace of Harderwijk (1446)
1449	1453	Revolt of Ghent (1449–1453)	Duchy of Burgundy; Burgundian Netherlands	Ghent rebels	Burgundian victory: Rebellion suppressed
1456	1458	Utrecht war (1456–1458)	Duchy of Burgundy; Burgundian Netherlands; Graauwerts; Cod league	Van Brederode; Van Montfoort; Lichtenbergers; Hook league	Burgundian victory: David of Burgundy recognised as Prince-Bishop of Utrecht
1458	1464	Donia War	Harinxmas (Schieringers)	Donias (Vetkopers)	Successive reconciliations between warring clans
1459	1459	Revolt against Arnold	Pro-Adolf Guelders; Duchy of Burgundy; Burgundian Netherlands	Pro-Arnold Guelders	Arnoldian victory: Adolf reconciles with Arnold, but continues plotting
1465	1468	Wars of Liège	Prince-Bishopric of Liège; Duchy of Burgundy; Burgundian Netherlands	Liégeois rebels Green Tent Companions; Kingdom of France	Burgundian victory: Burgundy de facto annexes Liège
1465	1468	War in Guelders	Pro-Adolf Guelders; Duchy of Burgundy; Burgundian Netherlands; Electorate of Cologne	Pro-Arnold Guelders; Duchy of Cleves; County of Mark	Adolfian victory (Battle of Straelen): Adolf imprisons Arnold (1465–1471); Adolf becomes Duke of Guelders; Guelders reclaims Wachtendonk
1473	1473	Burgundian conquest of Guelders	Duchy of Burgundy; Burgundian Netherlands; Duchy of Cleves; County of Mark	Duchy of Guelders; County of Zutphen	Burgundian victory: Burgundy inherits and conquers Guelders; Adolf remains in Burgundian prison (1471–1477)
1474	1477	Burgundian Wars	Duchy of Burgundy; Burgundian Netherlands; Duchy of Savoy	Duchy of Lorraine; Swiss Confederates	Franco–Swiss victory: Extinction of Valois-Burgundy; Outbreak of the War of the Burgundian Succession
1477	1482	War of the Burgundian Succession	Habsburg: Habsburg Monarchy; Duchy of Burgundy; Burgundian Netherlands	Valois-Orléans: Kingdom of France; Swiss Confederates; Duchy of Guelders	Treaty of Arras (1482), Treaty of Senlis (1493): Habsburg acquires Burgundian Netherlands and more; France annexes the Duchy of Burgundy, Picardy and more; Swiss Confederacy annexes some Burgundian lands
1477	1499	Guelderian War of Independence (1477–82, 1494–9) (part of the War of the Burgundian Succession)	Habsburg: Habsburg Monarchy; Duchy of Burgundy (1477–82); Burgundian Netherlands; Duchy of Cleves (1498–9); Duchy of Jülich (1498–9)	Guelders: Duchy of Guelders; Supported by: Kingdom of France	Guelderian victory: De facto Guelderian independence
1481	1483	Utrecht war of 1481–83 (part of the Hook and Cod Wars)	Cod league Duchy of Burgundy	Hook league Duchy of Cleves	Cod victory: Utrecht remains in Habsburg Burgundian hands
1483	1492	Flemish revolts against Maximilian	Habsburg Monarchy; Habsburg Netherlands	County of Flanders	Habsburg victory: City walls of Bruges demolished, loses economic position
1488	1490	Squire Francis War (part of the Hook and Cod Wars)	Cod league (pro-Habsburg); Habsburg Monarchy; Habsburg Netherlands	Hook league (anti-Habsburg)	Cod–Habsburg victory: Holland remains in Habsburg hands
1491	1492	Bread and Cheese Revolt	Habsburg Monarchy; Habsburg Netherlands	Bread and Cheese folk	Habsburg victory: Rebellion suppressed
1502	1543	Guelders Wars	Habsburg: Habsburg Monarchy (Spain) Spanish Empire (incl. Netherlands) County of Holland; County of Flanders; Duchy of Brabant; Duchy of Luxemburg Imperial Frisia (Saxony) (1514–15) Bishopric of Utrecht (1508–28)	Guelders: Duchy of Guelders; Groningen & Ommelanden (1514–36); Frisian rebels (1514–23); Jülich-Cleves-Berg (1538–43); Supported by: Kingdom of France County of East Frisia (1514–17) Utrecht rebel groups (1520–28)	Habsburg victory: Guelders, Utrecht, Frisia and Groningen annexed; Overijssel and Drenthe detached from Utrecht; Jülich and East Frisia remain independent
1514	1517	Saxon feud (part of the Guelders Wars)	Imperial Frisia (Saxony) (1514–15) Habsburg Netherlands (1515–17) 24 German princes: County of Oldenburg	County of East Frisia City of Groningen; Ommelanden; Frisian rebels Duchy of Guelders	Compromise: Imperial ban on Edzard of East Frisia lifted; Habsburg nominally gains Frisia, Groningen & Ommelanden; East Frisia nominally gains Harlingerland and Jever; East Frisia cedes Friesische Wehde to Oldenburg
1531	1534	Guelderian feud (part of the Guelders Wars)	County of East Frisia	Duchy of Guelders; Harlingerland Lordship of Jever	Guelderian victory; Peace of Logum: Jever becomes Habsburg vassal (1531); Harlingerland becomes Guelderian vassal; East Frisia pays war indemnity to Guelders
1539	1540	Revolt of Ghent (1539)	Habsburg Monarchy (Spain) Spanish Empire (incl. Netherlands)	Ghent rebels	Habsburg victory: Rebellion suppressed
1542	1546	Italian War of 1542–1546	Holy Roman Empire: Saxony; Brandenburg; (Spain) Spanish Empire (incl. Netherlands); Kingdom of England	Kingdom of France: (Old Swiss Confederacy) Swiss mercenaries; Ottoman Empire; Jülich-Cleves-Berg	Inconclusive: Treaty of Crépy (1544); Treaty of Ardres (1546)
1551	1559	Italian War of 1551–1559	Holy Roman Empire; (Spain) Spanish Empire (incl. Netherlands); Kingdom of England; Duchy of Mantua; Duchy of Florence; Duchy of Savoy	Kingdom of France; (Old Swiss Confederacy) Swiss mercenaries; Ottoman Empire; Republic of Siena	Spanish and Imperial (Habsburg) victory: Peace of Cateau-Cambrésis (1559)

- War of succession, diocesan feud or clan feud
- War of conquest (territorial control)
- Religious war
- Economic war (including socio-economic revolts)
- Revolt or rebellion (political)

== Bibliography ==
- Boffa, Sergio (2004). Warfare in Medieval Brabant, 1356-1406. Woodbridge, Suffolk: Boydell & Brewer. pp. 3–10. ISBN 9781843830610.
