= List of wars involving the Dutch Republic =

This is a list of wars involving the Dutch Republic, which emerged from the Habsburg Netherlands during the Eighty Years' War (c. 1566–1648). The set of "United Provinces" that would later become the Dutch Republic proclaimed its independence in 1581. In the Low Countries theatre of the War of the First Coalition, the Dutch Republic was conquered by the French First Republic in 1795, and replaced by the Batavian Republic.

- For earlier wars, see List of wars in the Low Countries until 1560.
- For simultaneous wars in the south, see List of wars in the southern Low Countries (1560–1829) – includes wars on the present territory of Belgium and Luxembourg, including the Southern Netherlands (Spanish Netherlands & Austrian Netherlands), the Principality of Liège, the Princely Abbey of Stavelot-Malmedy, the Prince-Bishopric of Cambrésis and the Imperial City of Cambray, the Duchy of Bouillon, and smaller states.
- For wars after 1795, see List of wars involving the Netherlands.

== List ==
Conflict and date	Combatant 1	Combatant 2	Result
Eighty Years' War (Note: See also List of battles of the Eighty Years' War.) (c. 1566/1568–1648)	Dutch Republic (from 1588) (Note: The nascent political organization reached by the rebellious northern provinces with the Union of Utrecht on 23 January 1579, Groenveld 2009, pp. 16–17 Groenveld 2009, pp. 10–11 would be followed by the Act of Abjuration on 26 July 1581, declaring de facto independence from Spain, Groenveld 2009, pp. 18–19 to finally become a republic by approving the Deduction of Vrancken on 12 April 1588.): (Dutch Republic) States-General (1576–1588) (Note: With the Pacification of Ghent on 8 November 1576, the States General of the Seventeen Provinces, except Luxemburg, managed to articulate a joint Catholic-Protestant political and military rebellion against the Spanish imperial government. But various political, religious and military circumstances caused this union to collapse in 1579, the year in which the Netherlands was divided in two, with the Catholic provinces of the south joining in the Union of Arras on 6 January and the Protestant provinces of the north (in general terms) at the Union of Utrecht of 23 January. The southern provinces would once again be under the orbit of the Spanish government, while the northern provinces would reaffirm their political and military alliance against Spain.); Dutch rebels (c. 1566/68–1576) (Note: The rebellious provinces of the Netherlands managed to form a joint political and military rebellion against Spain after the Pacification of Ghent on 8 November 1576.) European allies: Kingdom of England (1585–1604, 1625–1630); Kingdom of France (1589–1598, from 1635); Anjou (1578–1583) (Note: In 1576, the States General called, at the suggestion of William the Silent, Francis, Duke of Anjou, to request his protection. In 1578 Anjou intervened with an army of French in the south of the Netherlands, but did not achieve the expected results and withdrew. In the following years he again invaded the southern Netherlands, and on 23 January 1581 the Treaty of Plessis-les-Tours was ratified between Anjou and the States General to agree to his reign in the region. His intervention in the Netherlands ended in 1583 after several defeats of his forces.); Kingdom of Portugal (from 1641) (Note: After the outbreak of the Portuguese rebellion in 1640, on 12 June 1641, to the detriment of Spain, a truce and alliance agreement was reached between the Dutch Republic and Portugal with the Treaty of The Hague. But this agreement was only limited to Europe, thus continuing the struggle between the Dutch and Portuguese in the colonies.); Huguenots; Various Protestant German States Native overseas allies (from the 1600s); Kingdom of Ndongo; Kingdom of Matamba; Kingdom of Kongo; Johor Sultanate; Kingdom of Kandy	(Spain) Spanish Empire European co-belligerent: (Habsburg monarchy) Holy Roman Empire (1629, 1632, 1635) (Note: During the Thirty Years' War, the Holy Roman Empire supported Spain with Imperial forces on the Low Countries front in 1629, 1632, and 1635, although it never directly waged war against the Dutch Republic.) Native overseas allies (from the 1600s)	Peace of Münster: Spain recognises Dutch independence
Dutch–Portuguese War (1598–1663)	Dutch Republic	Portugal	Treaty of The Hague
Beaver Wars; 1609–1701	Iroquois League; Mohawks; Oneida; Seneca; Onondaga; Cayuga; Supported by: England; Dutch Republic	Huron; Algonquin; Susquehannock; Erie; Neutral; Petun; Odawa; Ojibwe; Wenro; Mahican; Innu; Abenaki; Supported by: France	Indecisive: Great Peace of Montreal; Huron-Wendat Confederacy destroyed
Ternatean–Portuguese conflicts 1530–1605 (intermittently)	Sultanate of Ternate; Dutch East India Company (from 1599)	Portuguese Empire; Spanish Empire; Sultanate of Tidore	Victory
Ming–Qing War (1618–1683)	(China) Qing dynasty; Aisin-Gioro clan; Manchus; Ming Defectors; Southern and Eastern Mongols; Joseon (Korea; after 1636); Dutch East India Company	Ming dynasty (1618–1644) Southern Ming (1644–1662): Hongguang and The Nanjing court (1644–1645); Longwu and The Fuzhou court (1645–1646); Shaowu and The Guangzhou court (1646–1647); Yongli and The Nanning court (1646–1662); Koxinga; Joseon (Korea); Yehe Jurchens; Tiandihui; Kingdom of Tungning (1661–1683); Northern Yuan dynasty (1618–1635); Chagatai Yarkent Khanate (1646–1650); Kumul Khanate; Turpan Khanate; Tokugawa Shogunate; Kingdom of Portugal	Victory: Collapse of the Ming dynasty and Southern Ming dynasty; Suppression of the rebel Kingdom of Shu, Xi dynasty, Shun dynasty, and Kingdom of Tungning; Consolidation of Qing dynasty rule in China proper
Uskok War (1615–1617)	Republic of Venice Dutch Republic; England	Holy Roman Empire Kingdom of Croatia; Spain	Victory: Many Uskok pirates executed or exiled; Austrian garrison installed to check Uskoks.
Dutch–Barbary war (1618–1622)	Dutch Republic	Ottoman Algeria; Tunisia	Victory: Dutch achieve favourable treaty, and attack on Dutch ships stop; Expedition to Algiers (1624) (Note: This expedition was launched after the Algerians broke the peace treaty.)
Dutch conquest of the Banda Islands (1609–1621)	Dutch East India Company (VOC); Dutch Republic	Bandanese fighters East India Company; Kingdom of England	Victory: Banda massacre committed; Dutch forces colonise the Banda Islands.
Expedition to Algiers (1624)	Dutch Republic	Ottoman Algeria	Victory
Siamese–Spanish War (1624–1636)	Siam (Dutch Republic) Dutch East India Company	(Spain) Iberian Union: (Spain) Spanish East Indies; Council of Portugal; Macau; Goa; Malacca	Victory: Dutch hegemony on Southeast Asia
Siege of Batavia (1628–1629)	Dutch Republic	Mataram Sultanate	Victory: The Mataram siege repelled
Dutch pacification campaign on Formosa (1635–1636)	Dutch Republic	Natives of Mattau, Bakloan, Soulang, Taccariang and Tevorang	Victory: Increased Dutch area of control
Lamey Island massacre (1636)	Dutch Republic	Taiwanese militia	Victory
Shimabara rebellion (1637–1638)	Tokugawa shogunate Dutch Republic	Christian peasant and ronin rebels	Victory: National seclusion policy imposed; Christianity driven underground in Japan
Cambodian–Dutch War (1643–1644)	Dutch East India Company	Kingdom of Cambodia	Defeat
Battle of the Gianh River (1643)	Dutch East India Company	Nguyễn domain of Đàng Trong	Defeat
Kieft's War (1643–1645)	Dutch Republic	Lenape	Victory
Torstenson War (1643–1645)	Sweden; Dutch Republic	Denmark-Norway	Victory
Sinhalese–Portuguese War (1538–1640)	Kingdom of Sitawaka; Kingdom of Kandy; Dutch East India Company (from 1638)	Portuguese Empire: Lascarins; Kingdom of Kotte	Victory: End of the kingdoms of Kotte, Sitawaka, Jaffna, and Raigama; End of Portuguese Ceylon; Incorporation of parts of Kotte and Sitawaka into the Kingdom of Kandy; Capture of Colombo, Galle, Jaffna, Raigama, and much of Sitawaka by the Dutch and the establishment of Dutch Ceylon
Conflict between Willem Leyel and Bernt Pessart (1643–1645)	(Denmark–Norway) Leyel loyalist (Dutch East India Company) Dutch Coromandel; English Madras (Portuguese Empire) Portuguese Carical Supported by: Thanjavur Nayak	(Danish India) Pessart loyalist	Victory: All of Danish India accepts Willem Leyel as governor
Guo Huaiyi rebellion (1652)	Dutch Republic	Guo Huaiyi's peasant army	Victory
Portuguese Restoration War (1640–1668)	Portugal; Dutch Republic (1641–1648); France (1641–1659); England (1662–1668)	Spain	Victory: Acclamation of John IV as the new King of Portugal (1640); The Habsburgs relinquish all claims to the Portuguese Throne; Treaty of Lisbon (1668); End of the Iberian Union
The Great Ambon War (1651–1656)	Dutch Republic other allies	Sultanate of Ternate other allies	Victory
First Anglo-Dutch War (1652–1654)	Dutch Republic	Commonwealth of England	Inconclusive (Note: Historians have different opinions on the outcome, for example historian Jonathan Israel calls it a complete Dutch victory, but another historian like Dagomar Degroot, mark it as stalemate, the historian Edward Kritzler marks it as inconclusive, and Nigel Cawthorne marks it as an English victory): Treaty of Westminster; Loevestein faction gains power in Dutch Republic at Orangists' expense
Capture of Fort Casimir (1654)	Dutch Republic	Sweden	Defeat: Delaware River falls into Swedish control
Conquest of New Sweden (1655)	Dutch Republic	Sweden	Victory: Dutch annexation of New Sweden
Peach War (1655)	Dutch Republic	Lenape	Defeat: Outlying Dutch settlements ordered to garrison at Fort Amsterdam; Staten Island abandoned but eventually retaken and equipped with better defenses
Capture of Carolusborg (1658)	Denmark–Norway; Dutch Republic; Fetu Kingdom; Rebellious slaves	Sweden	Victory: Carolusborg conquered by Denmark-Norway
Dano-Swedish War (1658–1660)	Denmark–Norway; Dutch Republic	Sweden	Victory
Second Northern War (1655–1660)	Poland (Poland-Lithuania); Denmark–Norway; Habsburg Monarchy; Russia (1656–1658); Crimean Khanate; Brandenburg-Prussia (1655–1656, 1657–1660); Dutch Republic	(Sweden) Swedish Empire; Brandenburg-Prussia (1656–1657); Principality of Transylvania; Ukrainian Cossacks (1657); Grand Duchy of Lithuania; Wallachia; Moldavia	Victory: Scania, Halland, Blekinge, Bohuslän, and Ven become Swedish; Duchy of Prussia becomes a sovereign state; Sweden's sovereignty in Swedish Livonia accepted
First Khoikhoi–Dutch Wars (1659–1660)	Dutch Republic	Khoikhoi militia	Victory
Esopus Wars (1659–1663)	Dutch settlers Mohawk	Esopus	Victory
Siege of Fort Zeelandia (1661–1662)	Dutch East India Company	China (Ming dynasty)	Defeat
Dano-Dutch War (1661–1665)	Dutch West India Company	Denmark–Norway; England	Defeat
First Tondano War (1661–1664)	Dutch Republic	Minahasan peoples	Victory
Trịnh–Nguyễn War (1627–1672)–(1774–1777)	Trịnh lords Dutch East India Company; Tây Sơn rebellion	Nguyễn lords Portugal	Victory
Makassar War (1666–1669)	Dutch Republic	Sultanate of Gowa	Victory: Treaty of Bongaya
Second Anglo-Dutch War (1665–1667)	Dutch Republic; Denmark; France	England; Bishopric of Münster	Victory: Uti possidetis; Treaty of Breda
Mughal conquest of Chittagong (1665–1666)	Mughal Empire: (Bengal Sultanate) Bengal Subah; Dutch Republic; Portuguese India	Kingdom of Mrauk U Burmese and Portuguese pirates	Victory: Annexation of Chittagong into Dominion of Hindustan as Bengal Subah
First Münster War (1665–1666)	Dutch Republic	(Prince-Bishopric of Münster) Bishopric of Münster; Supported by: Kingdom of England	Victory: Treaty of Kleve; Bernhard von Galen renounces his claim to the Lordship of Borculo
First Dutch-Zamorin War (1666–1668)	Dutch East India Company	Zamorin of Calicut	Victory
Second Dutch-Zamorin War (1670–1672)	Dutch East India Company	Zamorin of Calicut	Victory: Chetwai ceded to the Dutch
Kandyan–Dutch War (1670–1675)	Dutch Republic: Dutch East India Company	Kingdom of Kandy; France	Victory: French expelled from all occupied territories; Expansion of Dutch Ceylon, and Rajasinha's offenses repelled
Third Anglo-Dutch War (1672–1674)	Dutch Republic	England; France	Victory: Treaty of Westminster (1674)
Second Münster War (1672–1674)	Dutch Republic	(Prince-Bishopric of Münster) Bishopric of Münster; Kingdom of France; Electorate of Cologne	Victory
Franco-Dutch War (1672–1678)	Dutch Republic; Holy Roman Empire (from 1673); Spain (from 1673); Brandenburg-Prussia (from 1673); Lorraine (from 1673); Denmark–Norway (from 1674); England (1678)	France; England (1672–1674); Münster (1672–1674); Cologne (1672–1674) (Sweden) Swedish Empire (from 1674)	Treaties of Nijmegen; Large French territorial gains at expense of anti-French Alliance (Franche-Comté and territories in the Spanish Netherlands); France returns occupied Dutch territories of Maastricht and Principality of Orange in exchange for these gains
Second Khoikhoi–Dutch Wars (1673–1677)	Dutch Republic: Khoikhoi allies	Khoikhoi militia	Victory
Trunajaya rebellion (1674–1680)	Mataram Sultanate Dutch East India Company (VOC): VOC's Indonesian allies	Rebel forces Makassarese itinerant fighters Rival claimants to Mataram throne (after 1677)	Victory
Scanian War (1675–1679)	Denmark–Norway; Dutch Republic; Brandenburg-Prussia; Habsburg Monarchy Supported by: Scanian insurgents	Swedish Empire; Kingdom of France	Treaty of Fontainebleau (1679); Treaty of Lund (1679); Treaty of Saint-Germain-en-Laye (1679); Sweden cedes most of its Pomeranian areas east of the Oder to Brandenburg-Prussia.
Nine Years' War (1688–1697)	Dutch Republic; England; Holy Roman Empire; Spanish Empire; Duchy of Savoy; Scotland	France; Jacobites	Treaty of Ryswick; Louis XIV recognises William III of Orange as King of England, Scotland and Ireland.
Siamese Revolution (1688)	Phetracha and various Siamese lords Dutch Republic: Dutch East India Company	Prasat Thong dynasty Kingdom of France: (Kingdom of France) French East India Company	Victory: Establishment of Ban Phlu Luang dynasty.; Expulsion of French troops in Bangkok.
Williamite War in Ireland (1689–1691)	Williamites; Dutch Republic	Jacobites; France	Victory: Treaty of Limerick; Withdrawal of remaining Jacobite forces to France; Confirmation of William as King of Ireland
War of the Spanish Succession (1701–1714)	Dutch Republic (Austrian Empire) Austrian monarchy (Kingdom of Prussia) Prussia (Kingdom of England) England (until 1707) (Kingdom of Great Britain) Great Britain (from 1707); Holy Roman Empire; Piedmont-Savoy; Habsburg Spain; Portugal	France (Spain) Spanish monarchy Bavaria (~1704); Cologne; Mantua (~1708)	Treaty of Utrecht (1713); Treaty of Rastatt (1714); Treaty of Baden (1714); Philip is recognised as King of Spain, but once more renounces any claim to the throne of France; The Dutch Republic retains various forts in the Southern Netherlands and annexes a part of Spanish Guelders; Spain and Britain sign the Asiento; Spain cedes the Spanish Netherlands, Kingdom of Naples, Duchy of Milan, and Sardinia to the Habsburg monarchy, Sicily to the Duchy of Savoy and Gibraltar and Menorca to Britain; France recognizes British sovereignty over Rupert's Land and Newfoundland and cedes Acadia and its half of Saint Kitts to Great Britain; Spain cedes the Colony of Sacramento to the Portuguese Empire; The decline of Spanish global power
Third Dutch-Zamorin War (1701–1710)	Dutch East India Company	Zamorin of Calicut	Victory
First Javanese War of Succession (1704–1707)	Dutch Republic	Mataram Sultanate	Victory
Dutch–Algerian War (1715–1726)	Dutch Republic	Ottoman Algeria	Victory
Fourth Dutch-Zamorin War (1715–1718)	Dutch East India Company	Zamorin of Calicut (Kingdom of England) English East India Company (1715–1717)	Victory: Dutch annexation of Pappinivattam and Chettuva; War indemnity of 85,000 gold coins was paid to the Dutch
War of the Quadruple Alliance (1718–1720)	Great Britain; France; Austria; Dutch Republic	Spain	Victory: Treaty of The Hague; Austria cedes Sardinia to Savoy; Savoy cedes Sicily to Austria
Jacobite rising (1719)	Great Britain; Dutch Republic	Jacobites; Spain	Victory
Second Javanese War of Succession (1719–1723)	Dutch Republic; Mataram Sultanate	Rebel Princes	Victory
Rebellion of Sheikh Ahmad Madani (1730–1734)	Safavid Empire; Nader's personal domains English East India Company; Dutch East India Company (VOC)	Forces Loyal to Sheikh Ahmad Madani; Forces Loyal to Sheikh Jabbara; Forces Loyal to Sheikh Rashid bin Sa'id of Basaidu; Rebelling Arab tribes Hotak remnants and Afghan raiders	Victory: Persian Gulf Arabs reincorporated into Safavid Empire
Battle of Jacobshavn (1739)	Dutch Republic	Denmark–Norway	Defeat: Dutch presence on Greenland collapses
Batavia massacre (1740)	Dutch Republic; Native Indonesians allies	Chinese Indonesian militia	Military victory Political failure: Governor-General Adriaan Valckenier was arrested by the Dutch government for the atrocity and replaced by Johannes Thedens
War of the Austrian Succession (1740–1748)	Dutch Republic (1744–1748); Habsburg Monarchy; Great Britain (Province of Hanover) Hanover; Saxony (1743–1745); Sardinia (1742–1748); Russia (1741–1743, 1748)	France; Prussia (1740–1742, 1744–1745); Spain; Bavaria (1741–1745); Saxony (1741–1742); Sardinia (1741–1642); Genoa (1745–1748); Sweden (1741–1743); Duchy of Modena	Treaty of Aix-la-Chapelle: Prussian control of Silesia confirmed; Duchies of Parma, Piacenza, and Guastalla ceded to the Spanish Bourbons; All other territories restored to pre-war owners
Travancore–Dutch War (1741–1757)	Dutch Republic; Kingdom of Cochin	Kingdom of Travancore; Maratha Empire; Mysore	Military stalemate
Java War (1741–1743)	Dutch Republic	Joint army of Chinese and Javanese	Victory
Battle of Penfui (1749)	Dutch Republic; Timorese allies	Topasses; Timorese allies	Victory
Third Javanese War of Succession (1749–1757)	Mataram Sultanate (until 1755); Dutch Republic; Yogyakarta Sultanate (from 1755); Surakarta Sunanate (from 1755)	Anti-Dutch rebels	Victory: End of the Mataram Sultanate; Division of Mataram in 3 independent states called Surakarta Sunanate, Yogyakarta Sultanate, and Mangkunegaran Palace; Raden Mas Said's surrender
Cirebon War (1753–1773)	Dutch Republic: Dutch East India Company	Cirebon Sultanate	Victory
Fifth Dutch-Zamorin War (1753–1758)	Dutch East India Company	Zamorin of Calicut; Kingdom of Kandy	Victory: The Zamorin of Calicut ceded Madilagam, Puthanchira, Chettuwaye, and Pappinvattam to the Dutch and agreed to pay tribute to them as part of the peace agreement
Battle of Chinsurah (1759)	Dutch East India Company	East India Company; Bengal Subah	Defeat
Berbice slave uprising (1763–1764)	Dutch Republic; Arawak and Carib allies	Army of the Negroes of Berbice	Victory
Kandyan–Dutch War (1764–1766)	Dutch Republic: Dutch East India Company	Kingdom of Kandy	Victory: Treaty of Batticaloa
Dutch–Moroccan War (1775–1777)	Dutch Republic	Sultanate of Morocco	Victory
American Revolutionary War (1775–1783)	United States (Kingdom of France) France; Spain; Netherlands Mysore; Oneida; Tuscarora; Watauga Association; Catawba; Lenape; Choctaw	Great Britain; Loyalists (Holy Roman Empire) German Auxiliaries Iroquois; Onondaga; Mohawk; Cayuga; Seneca; Cherokee	Mixed results for the Dutch Republic: Treaty of Paris; Britain recognizes the independence of the United States of America; Dutch Republic gains United States as new ally and important trading partner, but Britain declares Fourth Anglo-Dutch War (1780–1784), defeating the Republic and causing the politically unstable Patriottentijd; Mutual ally France ends up in deep debt, which later became one of the causes of the French Revolution (1789); End of the First British Empire
First Xhosa–Dutch War (1779–1781)	Dutch Republic	Xhosa militia	Victory
Fourth Anglo-Dutch War (1780–1784)	Dutch Republic; Kingdom of France	Great Britain	Defeat: Treaty of Paris (1784); Britain gains free trade rights in parts of the Dutch East Indies; Dutch cede Negapatnam to Britain
Second Anglo-Mysore War (1780–1784)	Kingdom of Mysore; Kingdom of France; Dutch Republic	East India Company; Great Britain	Stalemate: Status quo ante bellum; Treaty of Mangalore
Gamrange expedition (1783)	Dutch East India Company; Sultanate of Ternate	Sultanate of Tidore	Defeat
Kettle War (1784)	Dutch Republic	Habsburg monarchy: Austrian Netherlands	Status quo ante bellum: Treaty of Fontainebleau (1785)
Patriot–Orangist battles (c. 1786–1787)	(Dutch Republic) Orangists	(Dutch Republic) Patriots	Inconclusive: Orangists capture Patriot strongholds Hattem and Elburg (September 1786); Patriots win Battle of Jutphaas and Bijltjesoproer (May 1787); Interrupted by pro-Orangist Prussian invasion of Holland (late 1787)
Prussian invasion of Holland (late 1787)	Kingdom of Prussia (Dutch Republic) Orangists	(Dutch Republic) States of Holland (Dutch Republic) Patriots	Prussian–Orangist victory: Orange Restoration
Second Xhosa–Dutch War (1789–1793)	Dutch Republic	Xhosa militia	Victory
War of the First Coalition (1792–1797)	First Coalition: Dutch Republic; (until 1795) (Note: Left the war after signing the Treaty of The Hague (1795) with France.); (Kingdom of France) French Royalists; Great Britain (Note: Including the Army of Condé); Holy Roman Empire (until 1797) (Note: Nominally the Holy Roman Empire, under Austrian rule, also encompassed many other Italian states, such as the Duchy of Modena and the Duchy of Massa. Left the war after signing the Treaty of Campo Formio with France.); Portugal; Prussia (until 1795) (Note: Left the war after signing the Peace of Basel with France.); Sardinia (until 1796) (Note: Left the war after signing the Treaty of Paris with France.); Spain (until 1795); Naples (until 1796)	(Constitutional Cabinet of Louis XVI) Kingdom of France (until 1792); (French First Republic) French Republic (from 1792); French satellites (Note: Including the Polish Legions formed in French-allied Italy in 1797, following the abolition of the Polish–Lithuanian Commonwealth after the Third Partition in 1795.): Batavian Republic (from 1795) (Note: The French Revolutionary Army and Dutch revolutionaries overthrew the Dutch Republic and established the Batavian Republic as a puppet state in its place.); Sister republics (Note: Various conquered Italian states, including the Cisalpine Republic from 1797); French naval allies: Spain (from 1796, naval only) (Note: Re-entered the war against Britain as an ally of France after signing the Second Treaty of San Ildefonso.)	French victory: Treaty of The Hague; Treaty of Paris; Peaces of Basel; Treaty of Tolentino; Treaty of Campo Formio; French annexation of the Austrian Netherlands, the Left Bank of the Rhine, Savoy, and other smaller territories; Santo Domingo to France; French sister republics established; End of millennial Venetian independence

- War of succession
- War of conquest (territorial control)
- Religious war (including the European wars of religion)
- Economic war (including colonial wars)
- Revolt or rebellion (political)

== Bibliography ==
- Groenveld, Simon (2009). Unie – Bestand – Vrede. Drie fundamentele wetten van de Republiek der Verenigde Nederlanden. Hilversum: Uitgeverij Verloren. p. 200. ISBN 978-9087041274. (in cooperation with H.L.Ph. Leeuwenberg and H.B. van der Weel)
- Groenveld, Simon; Leeuwenberg, Huib (2020). De Tachtigjarige Oorlog. Opstand en consolidatie in de Nederlanden (ca. 1560–1650). Derde editie (in Dutch). Zutphen: Walburg Pers. p. 750. ISBN 9789462495661. (e-book; original publication 2008; in cooperation with M. Mout and W. Zappey)
- Marek y Villarino de Brugge, André (2020b). Alessandro Farnese: Prince of Parma: Governor-General of the Netherlands (1545–1592): v. II. Los Angeles: MJV Enterprises, ltd., inc. ISBN 979-8687563130.
- Tarver, H. Michael; Slape, Emily (2016). The Spanish Empire: A Historical Encyclopedia. ABC-CLIO. ISBN 978-1610694216.
- van der Lem, Anton (1995). "Het verhaal van de Opstand. Hoofdstuk 5: De scheiding in de Nederlanden". De Opstand in de Nederlanden (1555–1648) (in Dutch). Uitgeverij Kosmos / Leiden University. Archived from the original on 18 September 2011.
