= List of wars in the southern Low Countries (1560–1829) =

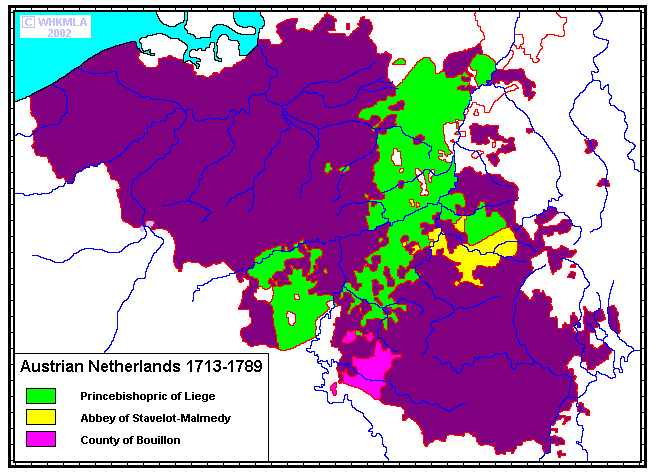
Overview of major territories in the southern Low Countries 1715–1789 Austrian Netherlands (Habsburg) Prince-Bishopric of Liège Princely Abbey of Stavelot-Malmedy Duchy of Bouillon (La Tour d'Auvergne)

This is a list of wars that occurred in the southern Low Countries between 1560 and 1829.

Unlike the 'Northern Netherlands', where a set of united provinces and cities proclaimed its independence in 1581 and would become the Dutch Republic in 1588, the southern Low Countries would remain dependent territories throughout this time. These non-sovereign territories included the Habsburg-owned Southern Netherlands (Spanish Netherlands until 1715, Austrian Netherlands until 1795), the Prince-Bishopric of Liège (until 1795), the Princely Abbey of Stavelot-Malmedy (until 1794), the Prince-Bishopric of Cambrésis and the Imperial City of Cambray (until 1678), the Principality of Sedan (until 1651), the Duchy of Bouillon (until 1795), and some western parts of the Duchy of Jülich (until 1795). Aside from these, there were various other small political entities such as the County of Enghien (until 1569), the Imperial Lordship of Kessenich (until 1784), the Duchy of Aarschot, the Duchy of Hoogstraten, the County of Horne, the Double Lordship of Maastricht, the Redemptiedorpen, the County of the Vroenhof (all until 1795), and so on. During the Brabant and Liège Revolutions (1789–1791), the United Belgian States and Liège Republic briefly achieved de facto independence, but remained unrecognised before the Habsburgs restored their power, and French Revolutionary armies soon conquered all the southern Low Countries and annexed them into the French First Republic in 1795. Most of the Low Countries were unified in 1815 as the newly created United Kingdom of the Netherlands under the House of Orange-Nassau, in personal union with the newly created Grand Duchy of Luxembourg, until the Belgian Revolution broke out in 1830.

- For earlier wars, see List of wars in the Low Countries until 1560.
- For simultaneous wars in the Northern Netherlands, see List of wars involving the Dutch Republic (1560–1795) and List of wars involving the Netherlands (1795–present)
- For subsequent wars in the southern Low Countries, see
  - List of wars involving Belgium (1830–present), from the Belgian Revolution onwards
  - List of wars involving Luxembourg (1890–present).

Start	Finish	Name of conflict	Belligents		Outcome
Start	Finish	Name of conflict	Combatant 1	Combatant 2	Outcome
1566	1648	Eighty Years' War (also called the Dutch Revolt) (mixed with the Thirty Years' War)	Spanish Empire (incl. Spanish Netherlands); Portuguese Empire (1580–1640); Austrian Habsburgs (1598–1621)	Dutch States Party (incl. Flanders, Brabant, Mechelen, Artois, Hainaut, Namur etc. c. 1576–1585): Calvinist Republic of Ghent (1577–1584); Antwerp Republic (1577–1585); Brussels Republic (1576–1584); Dutch Republic (1581/8–1648); Kingdom of England (1585–1604, 1625–30); Kingdom of France (1596–8, 1635–48)	Peace of Münster: Dutch Republic attains independence; Dutch Reformed Church acquires privileged status; Catholics, Lutherans and Jews tolerated; Southern Netherlands remain Spanish; Catholic Church remains the state religion, other religions remain illegal
1593	1595	Luxemburg campaigns (part of the Eighty Years' War)	Spanish Empire (incl. Spanish Netherlands); Prince-Bishopric of Liège (1595) (Note: Liège was neutral during the Eighty Years' War, but its neutrality was violated by the Dutch occupation of Huy in 1595. The prince-bishop of Liège appealed to the Spanish governor in Brussels for aid in driving the Dutch out, which was granted, after which the city was restored to Liégeois control.)	Dutch Republic; Duchy of Bouillon	Spanish victory: Dutch and Bouillonese troops withdraw
1635	1659	Franco-Spanish War (1635–1659) (emerged from the Thirty Years' War)	Spanish Empire (incl. Spanish Netherlands); Holy Roman Empire (1635–48); Modena and Reggio (1635–46); English Royalists (1657–59) (Note: Lord Wentworth's Regiment was integrated into the Spanish army.)	Kingdom of France; Dutch Republic (1635–48); Commonwealth of England (1654–59); Duchy of Savoy; Modena and Reggio (1647–49, 1655–59); Duchy of Parma (1635–37); Principality of Catalonia (1640–41); Catalan Republic (1641) Co-belligerent Kingdom of Portugal (1640–59) (Note: Portugal declared its independence from Spain in 1640, triggering the Portuguese Restoration War. Although the Portuguese were already engaged in the Dutch–Portuguese War since 1602, they agreed to a 10-year truce with the Dutch Republic in Europe (1640–1650) while both were fighting for independence from Spain; nevertheless, the colonial war between the Portuguese and the Dutch West India Company (WIC) in the Americas (especially Dutch Brazil) continued.)	French victory: Treaty of the Pyrenees; France acquires Artois and parts of Flanders (including Arras, Béthune and Gravelines), French Hainaut, parts of Luxembourg (including Montmédy and Thionville), the Three Bishoprics and Sedan; England acquires Dunkirk, but sells it to France in 1662
1667	1668	War of Devolution	(Spain) Spanish Empire (incl. Spanish Netherlands) Triple Alliance: Dutch Republic; Kingdom of England; (Sweden) Swedish Empire	Kingdom of France	Treaty of Aix-la-Chapelle (1668): France acquires Armentières, Bergues, Charleroi, Kortrijk, Douai, Veurne, Lille, Oudenaarde and Tournai
1672	1678	Franco-Dutch War (mixed with the Third Anglo-Dutch War) (mixed with the Scanian War)	Dutch Republic; Brandenburg-Prussia; Spanish Empire (incl. Spanish Netherlands); Duchy of Lorraine (from 1673); Holy Roman Empire (from 1673): Prince-Bishopric of Münster (1674–79); Lüneburg (Celle) (from 1674); and others; Denmark–Norway (from 1675)	Kingdom of France; Kingdom of England (1672–74); Prince-Bishopric of Münster (1672–74); Electorate of Cologne (1672–74); Kingdom of Sweden (from 1674)	Indecisive: Treaty of Westminster (1674); Treaties of Nijmegen (1678–79); France acquires Saint-Omer (Artois), Cassel, Aire and Ypres (Flanders), Cambrésis (definitively), Valenciennes and Maubeuge (Hainaut); La Tour d'Auvergne acquires sovereignty over Bouillon (as a French protectorate) from Liège, and renounces all rights to Sedan to France
1683	1684	War of the Reunions	Holy Roman Empire; Spanish Empire (incl. Spanish Netherlands); Republic of Genoa	Kingdom of France	French victory: Truce of Ratisbon; Spain cedes Luxembourg to France for 20 years; Holy Roman Empire cedes Strasbourg to France for 20 years
1688	1697	Nine Years' War	Dutch Republic; Kingdom of England; Holy Roman Empire: Austria; Electorate of Bavaria; Electoral Palatinate; Brandenburg-Prussia; Spanish Empire (incl. Spanish Netherlands); Kingdom of Portugal; Kingdom of Sweden; Duchy of Savoy Stavelot-Malmedy (Note: Stavelot-Malmedy was neutral during most wars, but in 1689 severely attacked by France.)	Kingdom of France	Peace of Ryswick: French razing of Malmedy and Stavelot on 4 October 1689
1701	1714	War of the Spanish Succession	Austria; Great Britain; Dutch Republic; Kingdom of Prussia; Kingdom of Portugal; Crown of Aragon; Duchy of Savoy	Kingdom of France; Spanish Empire (incl. Spanish Netherlands); Electorate of Bavaria; Hungarian rebels	Peace of Utrecht (1713–5); Treaty of Rastatt (1714)
1718	1720	War of the Quadruple Alliance	Austria (incl. Austrian Netherlands); Kingdom of France; Great Britain; Duchy of Savoy; Dutch Republic	Spanish Empire	Allied victory: Treaty of The Hague (1720)
1740	1748	War of the Austrian Succession	Austria (incl. Austrian Netherlands); Great Britain; Electorate of Hanover; Dutch Republic; Saxony (1743–45); Kingdom of Sardinia (1742–48); Russian Empire (1741–43, 1748)	Kingdom of France; Kingdom of Prussia (1740–42, 1744–45); Spanish Empire; Kingdom of Naples; Electorate of Bavaria (1741–45); Electoral Palatinate (1741–46); Electorate of Saxony (1741–42); Kingdom of Sweden (1741–43); Republic of Genoa (1745–48)	Treaty of Aix-la-Chapelle (1748): Maria Theresia recognised as Empress of Austria; Spain acquires the Parma and Piacenza from Austria; Austria recognises Prussian conquest of Silesia; France withdraws from Low Countries, Dutch Republic retrieves Barrier forts; France exchanges Madras against Ile-Royale with England
1784	1784	Kettle War	Dutch Republic	Austria (incl. Austrian Netherlands)	Dutch victory: Treaty of Fontainebleau (1785)
1789	1791	Liège Revolution	Liège Republic; United Belgian States (1790); Kingdom of Prussia (1790)	Prince-Bishopric of Liège; Austria	Austrian–episcopal victory: Restoration of the Prince-Bishopric of Liège
1789	1790	Brabant Revolution	Statists & Vonckists: United Belgian States (1790); Liège Republic; Kingdom of Prussia (1790)	Austria	Austrian victory: Temporary overthrow of Austrian rule by an émigré army, followed by local uprisings; Establishment of the United Belgian States; Growing friction between political factions; Exile of the liberal faction; First Austrian Restoration
1792	1797	War of the First Coalition (mostly the Low Countries theatre)	First Coalition: Dutch Republic; Holy Roman Empire: Habsburg monarchy (Austria); Kingdom of Prussia; Electorate of Hanover; Hesse-Kassel; Great Britain; Spanish Empire (1793–95)	Kingdom of the French (1792); French First Republic (from 1792): Republic of Bouillon (1794–95); Batavian Republic (from 1795); Ligurian Republic (from 1795); Cisrhenian Republic (1797); Cisalpine Republic (1797); other sister republics; Spanish Empire (1796–97)	French victory: All southern Low Countries annexed by France (1795); Treaty of The Hague (1795): Batavian Republic established as a French sister republic; Treaty of Campo Formio (1797): Habsburg Monarchy accepts the loss of the Austrian Netherlands
1798	1798	Peasants' War (1798)	Brigands	French First Republic	French victory: Revolt suppressed
1798	1802	War of the Second Coalition	Second Coalition: Holy Roman Empire (until 1801); Habsburg monarchy (Austria, until 1801); Russian Empire (until 1798); Great Britain (until 1801); United Kingdom (from 1801); Kingdom of Portugal; Kingdom of Naples; Ottoman Empire; French royalists	French First Republic: Batavian Republic; Cisalpine Republic; Helvetic Republic; Ligurian Republic; Roman Republic (1798–99); Parthenopean Republic (1799); other sister republics; Spanish Empire	French victory: France briefly conquers the Papal States and captures Pope Pius VI (1798–99); Treaty of Lunéville (1801) recognises Holy Roman Empire's loss of southern Low Countries to France; Concordat of 1801: Pope Pius VII recognises the abolition of the Prince-Bishopric of Liège
1803	1806	War of the Third Coalition (part of the Napoleonic Wars)	Third Coalition: United Kingdom; Sweden (1804–06); Russian Empire (1805–06); Holy Roman Empire (1805); Austrian Empire (1805); Kingdom of Naples (1805–06); Kingdom of Sicily (1805–06)	First French Empire: Batavian Republic; Etruria; (Kingdom of Italy (Napoleonic)) Italy; Spain; (Electorate of Bavaria) Bavaria; Württemberg	French victory: Treaty of Pressburg (1805): Austrian Empire leaves Coalition; Consolidation of the First French Empire; Dissolution of the Holy Roman Empire (Note: Holy Roman Emperor Francis II of Habsburg proclaimed the Austrian Empire on 11 August 1804, elevating the Habsburg monarchy to imperial status by himself. The indirect causes of this move are the French conquest of the Rhineland and further expansion into Germany and the Reichsdeputationshauptschluss of 1803, which curbed the meaning and power of the Holy Roman Empire/Emperor. The direct cause of Francis' proclamation was the adoption of the new French Constitution of 18 May 1804, which appointed Napoleon as Emperor of the French (followed by his coronation on 2 December 1804). Instead of an increasingly meaningless and non-hereditary title that was dependent on the cooperation of the Electors and was limited to only the northwestern parts of his Hausmacht, Francis now made all Austrian Habsburg possessions into a unified hereditary empire.); Creation of the Confederation of the Rhine; Formation of the Fourth Coalition a few months later
1813	1814	War of the Sixth Coalition	Sixth Coalition: Russia (already at war); United Kingdom (already at war); Spain (already at war); Portugal (already at war); Sweden (3 March); Mecklenburg-Schwerin (14 March); Prussia (17 March); Sardinia; Sicily; After Pläswitz (June–August 1813): Austria (12 August); Bavaria (8 Oct.); After Leipzig (October 1813): Saxony (18 Oct.); Württemberg (18 Oct.); Baden (mid-November); Principality of the Netherlands (21 Nov.); Liechtenstein; After January 1814 Denmark	France: Duchy of Warsaw (Note: Duchy of Warsaw as a state was in effect fully occupied by Russian and Prussian forces by May 1813, although most Poles remained loyal to Napoleon.); Italy; Naples; Until January 1814: Confederation of the Rhine (Note: Many member states of the Confederation of the Rhine defected after Battle of Leipzig.); Denmark–Norway	Coalition victory: Napoleon abdicates and is captured; Future of southern Low Countries determined at Congress of Vienna (1814–15)
1815	1815	Hundred Days (also called War of the Seventh Coalition) (part of the Napoleonic Wars)		First French Empire	Coalition victory: Congress of Vienna is concluded with Final Act (9 June 1815); French borders reduced to pre-1792 situation, Bourbon Restoration; Most southern Low Countries incorporated into the United Kingdom of the Netherlands under Orange; Dutch king also becomes grand duke of Luxemburg, now a German Confederation member state; Eupen-Malmedy, Bitburg-Prüm, Niederkrüchten and Erkelenz annexed by Prussia

- War of succession
- War of conquest (territorial control)
- Religious war (European wars of religion)
- Economic war
- Revolt or rebellion (political)
