= List of wars involving Belgium =

This article is an incomplete list of wars and conflicts involving Belgium, its colonial empire, or Belgians before the creation of a Belgian state.

== Before the creation of a Belgian state (–1789) ==
- Battle of Amblève - 716 - Frankish Civil War
- Battle of Thimeon - 880 - Frankish–Viking battles
- Battle of Leuven - 891 - Frankish–Viking battles
- Battle of Axspoele - 1128
- Battle of Noville - 1194 - War of the Namen-Luxembourg Succession
- Battle of Damme - 1213 - Anglo-French War (1213–1214)
- Battle of Steppes - 1213

=== Franco-Flemish War ===
- Battle of Furnes - 1297 - Franco-Flemish War
- Battle of the Golden Spurs - 1302 - Franco-Flemish War
- Battle of Arques - 1303 - Franco-Flemish War

=== Hundred Years' War ===
- Siege of Tournai - 1340 - Hundred Years' War
- Battle of Scheut - 1365
- Battle of Beverhoutsveld - 1382 - Revolt of Ghent (1379–1385)
- Battle of Roosebeke - 1382 - Revolt of Ghent (1379–1385)
- Siege of Ypres - 1383 - Hundred Years' War

=== Revolts against Burgundy ===
- Battle of Othée - 1408 - Wars of Liège
- Battle of Nevele - 1452 - Ghent War (1449–1453)
- Battle of Bazel - 1452 - Ghent War (1449–1453)
- Battle of Gavere - 1453 - Ghent War (1449–1453)
- Battle of Montenaken - 1465 - Wars of Liège
- Siege of Dinant - 1466 - Wars of Liège
- Battle of Brustem - 1467 - Wars of Liège

=== Italian Wars ===
- Siege of Tournai - 1521 - Italian War of 1521–1526

=== Eighty Years' War ===
- Battle of Oosterweel - 1567 - Eighty Years' War
- Battle of Jodoigne - 1568 - Eighty Years' War
- Siege of Mons - 1572 - Eighty Years' War
- Battle of Saint-Ghislain - 1572 - Eighty Years' War
- Battle of Lillo - 1574 - Eighty Years' War
- Battle of Vissenaken - 1576 - Eighty Years' War
- Siege of the Spaniards' Castle - 1576 - Eighty Years' War
- Battle of Gembloux - 1578 - Eighty Years' War
- Siege of Zichem - 1578 - Eighty Years' War
- Siege of Nivelles - 1578 - Eighty Years' War
- Siege of Limburg - 1578 - Eighty Years' War
- Battle of Rijmenam - 1578 - Eighty Years' War
- Siege of Binche - 1578 - Eighty Years' War
- Battle of Borgerhout - 1579 - Eighty Years' War
- Battle of Baasrode - 1579 - Eighty Years' War
- Siege of Tournai - 1581 - Eighty Years' War
- Siege of Oudenaarde - 1582 - Eighty Years' War
- Siege of Ghent - 1583–1584 - Ghent War
- Fall of Antwerp - 1584 - Eighty Years' War
- Siege of Brussels - 1584–1585 - Eighty Years' War
- Battle of the Kouwensteinsedijk - 1585 - Eighty Years' War
- Battle of Turnhout - 1597 - Eighty Years' War
- Battle of Nieuwpoort - 1600 - Eighty Years' War

== After the creation of a Belgian state (1789–) ==
Belgian victory

Belgian defeat

Ceasefire

Start	Finish	Name of Conflict	Belligerents (excluding Belgium)		Outcome
Start	Finish	Name of Conflict	Allies	Enemies	Outcome
1789	1790	Brabant Revolution	United Belgian States	(Holy Roman Empire) Habsburg Austria	Austrian victory: Revolution suppressed
1830	1839	Belgian Revolution: Ten Days' Campaign	Belgian rebels France	United Kingdom of the Netherlands	Treaty of London: Recognition by the European powers of the independence and neutrality of Belgium
1832	1834	Liberal Wars	Portugal United Kingdom; France; Spain	(Portugal) Miguelites	Liberal victory, Constitutional monarchy is restored
1861	1867	French intervention in Mexico	(Mexico) Mexican Empire France; Austrian Empire; Spain; United Kingdom; Egypt Eyalet; Polish Revolutionaries	(Mexico) United Mexican States United States of America (entered in 1865)	French withdrawal, Republican victory
1881	1899	Mahdist War	British Empire; Kingdom of Italy; Congo Free State; Ethiopian Empire	(Sudan) Mahdist Sudanese	Anglo-Egyptian victory
1891	1892	Stairs Expedition to Katanga	(Congo Free State) Congo Free State supported by: Belgium	Yeke state of Msiri	Congo Free State victory: Msiri killed, Mukanda-Bantu becomes vassal prince; Belgium acquires the colony of Katanga
1892	1894	Belgo-Arab War	Congo Free State	Zanzibari slave traders	Congo Free State victory
1895	1895	Luba rebellion	(Congo Free State) Congo Free State supported by: Belgium	Luba rebels	Congo Free State victory: Many Luba men had to perform forced labour in the Katanga mines
1895	1908	Batetela Rebellions	Congo Free State	Batetela people	Congo Free State victory
1905	1917	Kasongo Nyembo rebellion	Congo Free State (until 1908); Belgium: Belgian Congo (from 1908)	Luba rebels led by Kasongo Nyembo	Belgian victory: Kasongo Nyembo banished
1914	1918	World War I	Allies: France; British Empire; Russian Empire (1914–17); United States (1917–18) and others	Central Powers German Empire; Austria-Hungary; Ottoman Empire; Kingdom of Bulgaria (1915–18)	Allied victory: Belgium acquires Eupen-Malmedy from Germany
1914	1918	East African campaign (part of World War I)	Allies: United Kingdom: South Africa; India; Rhodesia; British East Africa; Nyasaland; Uganda; Belgium: Belgian Congo; Portugal: Portuguese Mozambique	Central Powers German Empire: German East Africa	Allied victory: Allied conquest and partition of German East Africa; Belgium acquires Ruanda-Urundi from German East Africa
10 May 1940	28 May 1940	Battle of Belgium (part of World War II)	Belgium; France British Empire; Netherlands; Luxembourg	Nazi Germany	Belgian surrender and German occupation of Belgium
1940	1945	World War II	Allies	Axis powers	Allied victory
1950	1953	Korean War	United Nations (UN Resolution 84)	North Korea China; Soviet Union	Ceasefire
1959	1962	Rwandan Revolution			Independence of the Republic of Rwanda; Independence of the Kingdom of Burundi
1960	1966	Congo Crisis	Katanga South Kasai	Republic of the Congo (Léopoldville) United Nations (United Nations Operation in the Congo)	Withdrawal of Belgian Armed Forces: Debellation of the State of South Kasai in 1961; Debellation of the State of Katanga in 1963; New Belgian intervention Operation Dragon Rouge and Operation Dragon Noire in 1964
1978	1978	Shaba II	Zaire France; United States	Front for the National Liberation of the Congo	Franco-Belgian victory
1990	1991	Gulf War	Coalition forces	Ba'athist Iraq	Coalition victory
1991	2003	Iraqi no-fly zones	United States; United Kingdom; France (1991–1998); Australia; Netherlands; Saudi Arabia; Turkey; Italy	Ba'athist Iraq	Coalition victory
1992	1995	Somali Civil War	United States; United Kingdom; Spain; Saudi Arabia; Malaysia; Pakistan; Italy; India; Greece; Germany; France; Canada; Botswana; Australia	(Somalia) United Somali Congress	Victory: UN humanitarian mandate fulfilled.; About 100,000 lives were saved by outside resistance.; Civil war is ongoing.
1998	1999	Kosovo War	Kosovo Liberation Army Albania; NATO force	Federal Republic of Yugoslavia	NATO victory: United Nations Interim Administration Mission in Kosovo
2001	2021	War in Afghanistan	Afghanistan United States; ISAF	(Afghanistan) Taliban	Taliban victory
2011		2011 military intervention in Libya	(Libya) National Transitional Council NATO forces	(Libya) Libyan Arab Jamahiriya	Fall of Gaddafi régime
2014	ongoing	2014 military intervention against ISIS		Islamic State of Iraq and the Levant	Ongoing

== See also ==
- List of wars in the Low Countries until 1560 – includes wars on the present territory of Belgium until 1560.
- List of wars in the southern Low Countries (1560–1829) – includes wars on the present territory of Belgium, including the Southern Netherlands (Spanish Netherlands & Austrian Netherlands), the Principality of Liège, the Princely Abbey of Stavelot-Malmedy, the Prince-Bishopric of Cambrésis and the Imperial City of Cambray, the Duchy of Bouillon and smaller states.
- List of wars involving the Netherlands (1815–1839) – includes colonial wars in which the south participated as part of the United Kingdom of the Netherlands
- History of Belgium
- Belgian Army
