= Great Frisian War =

15th-century war in Frisia

- Part of the conflicts between the Skieringers and Fetkeapers and the Heeckerens and Bronckhorsts
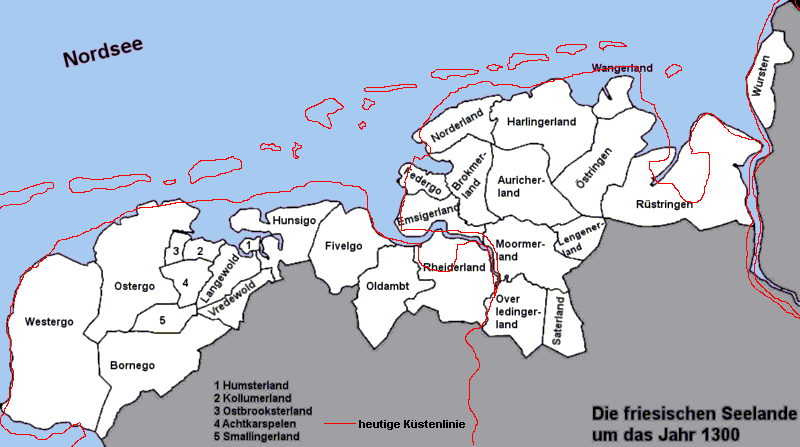
- The Frisian lands, c. 1300
Date	1413 – 1422
Location	Frisia between the Vlie and Weser, Holy Roman Empire
Result	Peace of Groningen

Belligerents
Pro-Skieringers: Skieringers; van Heeckeren family; Abdena family; opponents of the Onsta family; Supported by: Holland (1421)	Allies: Fetkeapers; van Bronckhorst family; tom Brok family; Onsta family; Supported by: Zwolle; Kampen; Deventer

Commanders and leaders
Hisko Abdena; Sikke Sjaarda; Koppen Jarges John III	Keno II tom Brok; Okko II tom Brok; Fokko Ukena

The Great Frisian War (West Frisian: Grutte Fryske Oarloch) was an armed conflict in Frisia which lasted nine years in the 15th century, from 1413 to 1422.

The war began in East Frisia as a result of a runaway dispute between the chieftains Keno II tom Brok and Hisko Abdena, during which all important parties in Frisia chose a side and civil war ensued. The war had mixed results; with the exception of the van Bronckhorst family in the city of Groningen, none of the warring parties would gain a lasting advantage. Near the end of the conflict, Frisian freedom was imperiled when a foreign ruler, John of Bavaria who was asked to intervene on the side of the Skieringers, decided to make a bid for power himself. His Hollandic troops were driven out shortly, however, and the Frisians would retain their freedom until 1498. On 1 February 1422, all parties came to Groningen to make peace.

== Background ==
The immediate cause of the war was a feud between the East Frisian tom Brok and Abdena families. Underlying reasons can be found in the civil struggles that existed throughout Frisia during the 14th and 15th centuries, having escalated from constant disputes in which one side would react with increasing hostility to the actions of the other. In these struggles, feuding parties would seek alignment with other opponents of their enemies and in doing so weaved an intricate web of alliances and loyalties. What also played a role in many disputes were the interests of the Frisian chieftains, who either strove to increase their power or to maintain the status quo.

In the Great Frisian War two parties opposed each other, composed of different groups from all over Frisia. One side was made up by the Skieringers (Dutch: Schieringers) in Middle Frisia, the van Heeckeren family in the city of Groningen, opponents of the Onsta family in the Ommelanden, and the Abdena family of Hisko Abdena in East Frisia. The other side, who together formed the Allies, were the Fetkeapers (Dutch: Vetkopers) in Middle Friesland, the van Bronckhorst and Onsta families in modern-day Groningen, and the tom Brok family of Keno II tom Brok in East Frisia.

== History ==
=== Attack on Emden ===
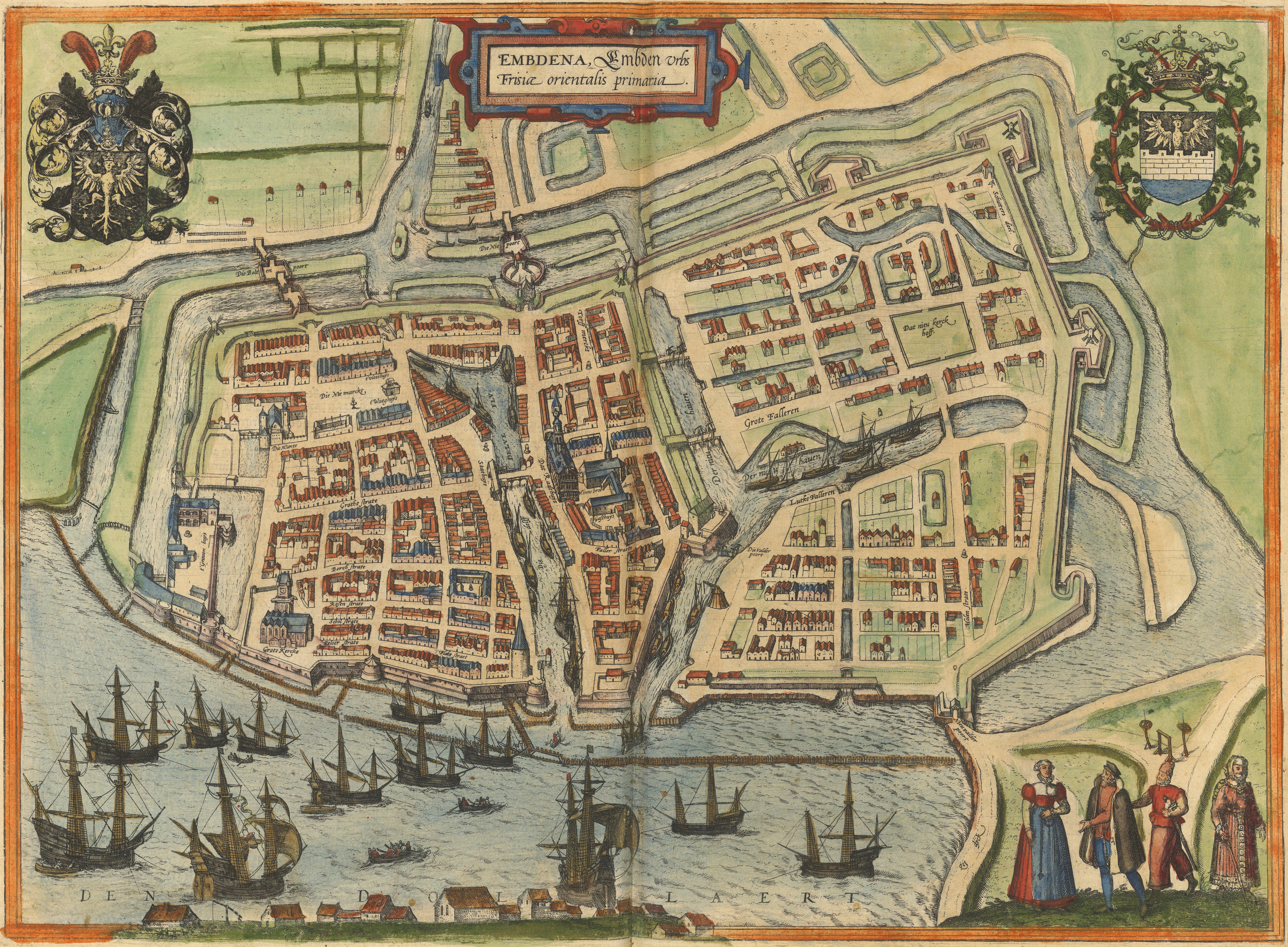
Historical map of Emden.

In East Frisia, where the war started, there had been a power struggle between the tom Brok and Abdena families for some time. Both families wanted sole rule in the region, and had already crossed swords in 1380, which resulted in the Battle of Loppersum which was won by the tom Brok family. After that, there were mutual attempts at reconciliation, interspersed with fierce confrontations, each ending with peace talks. Tensions arose again in August 1413, when pirates from Emden attacked Everd Idzinga's servants. Idzinga was an ally of Keno II tom Brok who took the matter seriously and presented it to the council of the city of Groningen. The council agreed with Keno and forced Hisko Abdena to compensate the damages. When the payment was not made in time, Keno found this dishonorable, so he attacked the town of Emden, which was the capital of the Abdena family.

After a short-lived battle in East Frisia, Emden fell to Keno II tom Brok on 21 October 1413 and Hisko Abdena fled to the Ommelanden. When he arrived at the city of Groningen, it turned out to be strongly influenced by the van Bronkhorst and Onsta families, who were sympathetic to the Fetkeapers. The city council refused him entry. This aroused the ire of the local Skieringers. Led by Koppen Jarges, the city council was shoved aside and Hisko was allowed to enter the city. The Fetkeapers from Groningen and the Ommelanden sought refuge with Keno, who established himself as leader.

There was a brief lull in the conflict. Open confrontation did not resume until the second half of the year 1415. During that time, the parties involved tried to inflict as much damage as possible on each other by means of piracy. In response, Okko II tom Brok had part of the Ommelanden flooded and the Skieringers under Koppen Jarges went on a rampage in the Ommelanden to pay for its defense.

=== Groningen in Allied hands ===
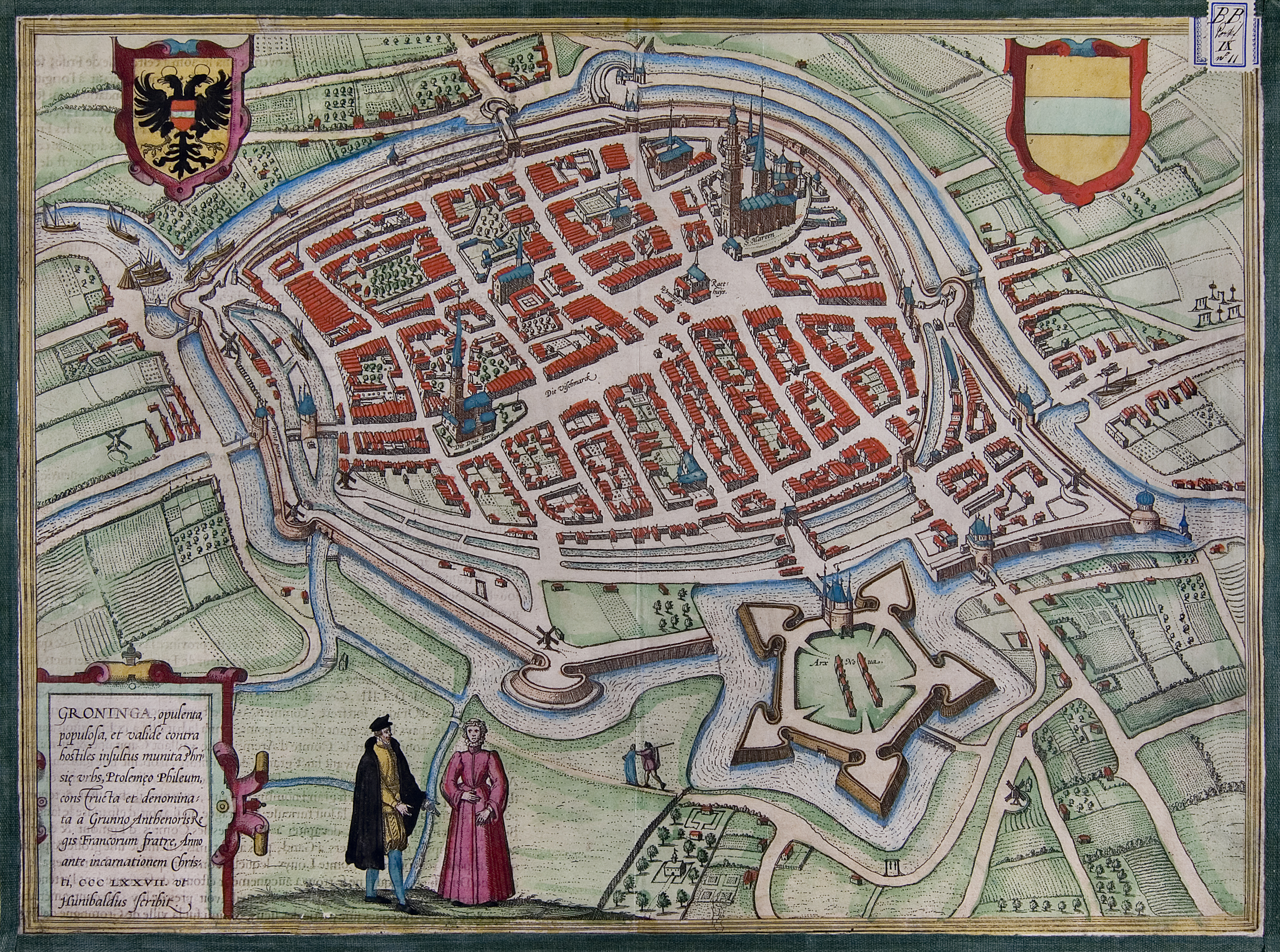
Map of medieval Groningen.

The Allied side made plans to regain possession of Groningen and assembled a large fleet. While the fleet waited for the arrival of the Skieringers, many Ommeland allies of Keno II tom Brok gathered in Eelde. From there, they moved on to the city of Groningen. It was poorly defended and on the night of 13 and 14 September 1415 the city fell into Allied hands. When Keno's fleet landed, Koppen fled with the Skieringer army to Kampen and from there to Sneek and later to Bolsward. Koppen wanted to return as quickly as possible to regain control of Groningen and reconstituted his armed forces in Middle Frisia. He also expanded it by convincing other Skieringers to join the fight against Keno and his party. He received unexpected help from Sigismund, King of the Romans and future Holy Roman Emperor. The focus of the war shifted from East Frisia and the city of Groningen to the west of the Ommelanden.

=== Battle of Okswerderzijl and the attack on Dokkum ===
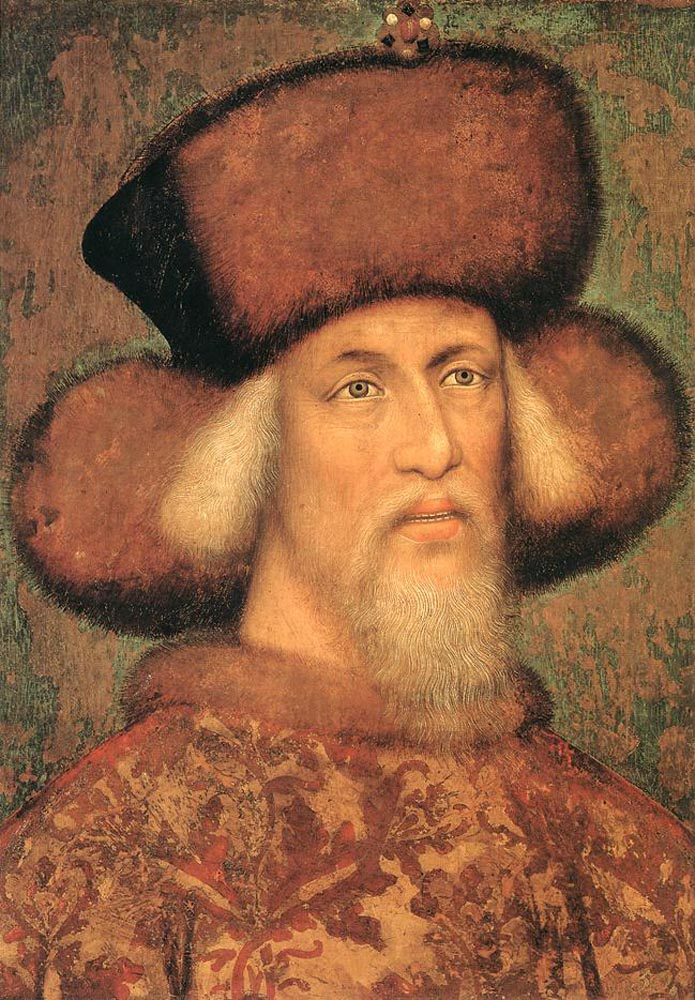
Portrait of Sigismund, Holy Roman Emperor.

In early June 1417, a strong Skieringer army set out to conquer the city of Groningen. From Middle Frisia they crossed the river Lauwers. On the way, Aduard Abbey was first taken to be used as a fortification. Keno, the leader opposing them, had meanwhile sent his army from East Frisia to help the Ommelanders. On 18 June, both sides faced each other at Okswerderzijl. Chief Sikke Sjaarda of Franeker led the Skieringer troops and Keno was in charge of the Allies.

Both sides were present in large numbers, which later became apparent from the many casualties left on the field. Heavy fighting took place during the battle in which atrocities were committed by both sides. Yet the battle was won by the Allies and not by the Skieringers. According to the Frisian historian Ubbo Emmius, the East Frisian chieftain Fokko Ukena who fought alongside Keno would have had a large share in the course of the battle. On the Skieringer side, more than 500 fighters were killed and 400 were captured. The other Skieringers fled. The victors also suffered many casualties, although the exact number has not been recorded.

Keno had the Skieringers in check, but was unable to defeat them decisively, as illness forced him to return to Brokmerland. Two days after the victory, Groningen, Hunsingo and Fivelingo made a new alliance whereby they promised each other that they would no longer recognize a foreign ruler. Part of Keno's army remained in Groningen led by Fokko Ukkena and Sibet Papinga. They gave chase to the Skieringers who had fled towards Achtkarspelen and were guilty of looting and robbery.

The defeat at Okswerderzijl had seriously weakened the Skieringer party in Frisia. The Skieringers sought help and thought they had found it with Sigismund, future Emperor of the Holy Roman Empire. Although he promised support, he did not send any military troops. This allowed the Allied army in Achtkarspelen to continue to impose their will on the Skieringers in Middle Frisia. Only at sea did they succeed in thwarting the Allies through piracy. The Victual Brothers assisted them in this. For the pirates, the city of Dokkum with its fortifications was of great strategic importance. Therefore, in 1418, the Allied army, led by Fokko Ukena, attacked Dokkum. It didn't take them much effort to get their hands on the city. Dokkum was burned and rendered militarily harmless by demolishing the city walls. However, the bulk of the armed Skieringers stayed at the stins of Ezumazijl, where the battle continued. At Ezumazijl it was much more intense than at Dokkum. The attackers had almost given up when the defenders finally surrendered and the stronghold could be captured.

=== Focko Ukena's raid on Middle Friesland ===
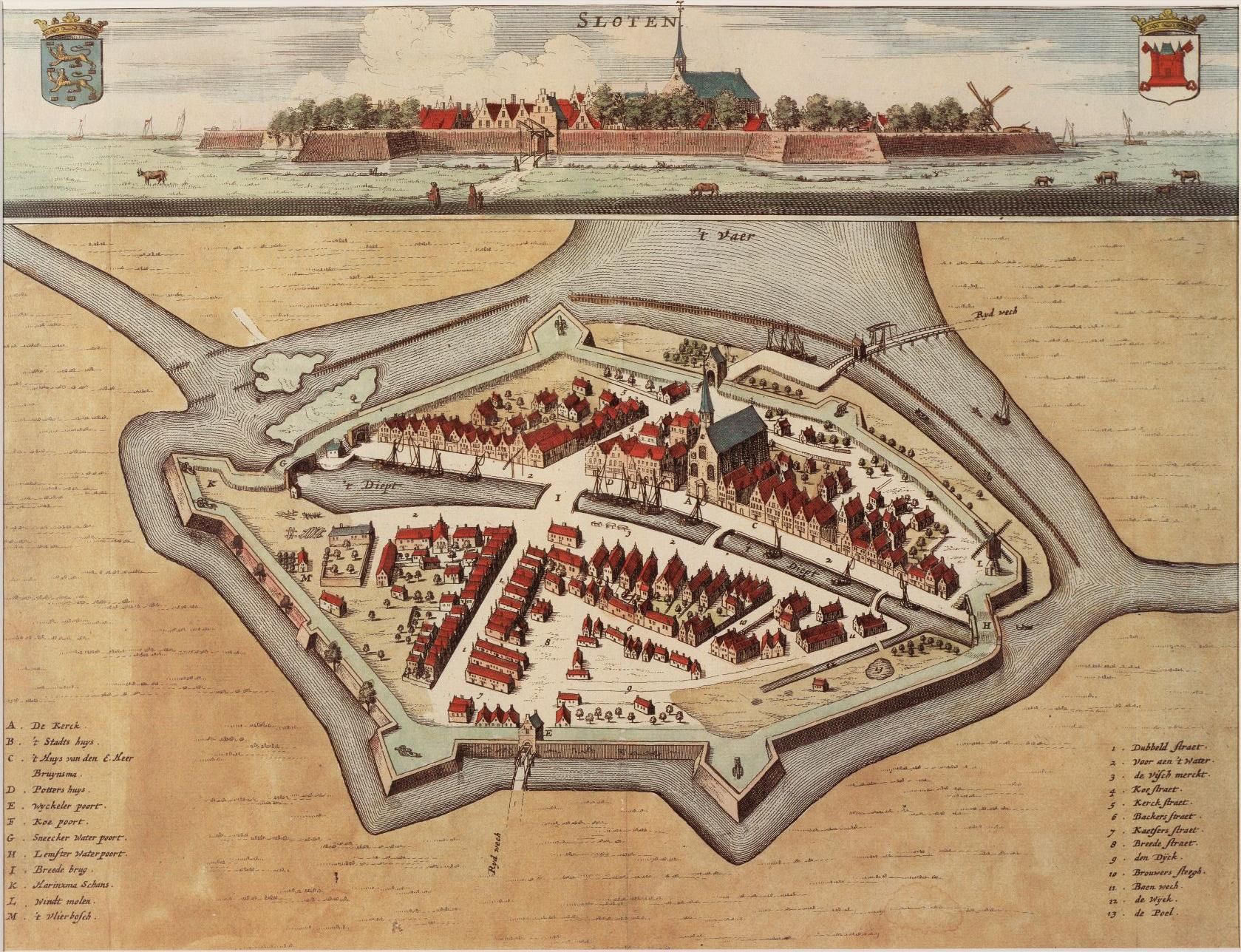
Historical map and skyline of Sloten.

By defeating the Skieringers on their own soil, the Allies dealt them a sensitive blow. The power of the Skieringers was all but broken and they were ready to make peace with the victors. To stop the looting, they paid an estimate of several thousand Frankish shillings. Then the Allied army withdrew and peace talks began. These talks took place under the leadership of Nicholas of Bunzlau, an envoy of the Roman king. The Allies paid him 10,000 Rhenish guilders to buy off the 'eight' from Sigismund and made a proposal for peace to the Skieringers. The negotiations were at an advanced stage when news of the victory of Sikke Sjaarda over a Fetkeaper army reached Franeker. That incident and the fact that Nicholas of Bunzlau still had some doubts about accepting the Allied proposal was reason for the Allies to end the peace talks.

The Skieringers, for their part, went in search of new allies and found them in the Bishop of Münster and Sibet Papinga of Rüstringen. Thus reinforced they made a number of attacks on Fetkeaper strongholds in Middle Frisia. On 30 April 1420, they captured the city of Bolsward from the Fetkeapers. The Allies reacted immediately and, led by Fokko Ukena, a fleet sailed via the Vlie towards Hindeloopen. The Skieringers were surprised by the swift arrival of Ukena, but soon managed to raise an army. The leadership of this army was again in the hands of Sikke Sjaarda and on 12 May 1420, both armies faced each other at the Palesloot near Hindeloopen. It was the second time for Fokko and Sikke to meet on the battlefield, and once again Fokko emerged victorious. He captured many Skieringers, but a large number managed to escape to Sloten and Stavoren. Fokke went to Sloten, where Sikke was, and besieged the city.

The besieged Skieringers sought refuge with John of Bavaria, who sent an army led by Hendrik van Renesse. The Allies were surprised by the arrival of this army in Friesland. On 11 July 1420, a battle came to a close at Sloten that the Allies lost. Fokko Ukena managed to escape, but a number of important chieftains were captured.

== Peace talks ==
After seven years of war, the Frisians seemed to have become war-weary. On 5 August 1420, Okko II tom Brok and the party of Sikke Sjaarda concluded a truce for a period of twenty years, and on 14 September 1420, the goa of Eastergoa and Westergoa concluded a treaty with the city of Groningen, the Ommelanden and Okko II tom Brok. During these peace talks fighting continued at Midlum, where the Lúntsjerk monastery was attacked by the monks of the Blomkamp monastery, and only twelve days after the ceasefire the Allies attacked again. They largely burn the city of Staveren and Koppen Jarges is among the casualties. At Dokkum and Lemmer, the Victual Brothers appear, who settle there to commit piracy on the surrounding waters. Skieringer refugees ask John of Bavaria in Holland for help.

=== The intervention of John of Bavaria ===
On the condition that the Skieringers would acknowledge him as their lord, John of Bavaria sent soldiers to Middle Frisia. Led by Hendrik van Struik and Gerard van Heemskerk, a Hollandic army arrived in March 1421 to "liberate" Friesland. However, the Count of Holland had more in mind. He not only wanted to bring Middle Frisia under his control, but also wanted to keep it and therefore sent more and more troops to the area. With the help of the Hollanders, Allied strongpoints were recaptured and on 24 March 1421, the most important city of Middle Frisia, Leeuwarden, was taken. There was no major Allied counterattack, but there was looting by bands of corsairs. One of those groups was defeated by a small Hollandic army near Dokkum.

Okko II tom Brok became weary of war and wanted to make peace with the Skieringers. On 15 July 1421, all parties met in Greetsiel, Emsigerland for peace talks. John of Bavaria represented the Skieringers, Okko and Sibet Papinga the Allies. The outcome of the talks was recorded in an accord. The boundary between the two sides was drawn on the Lauwers. To the west of that river, Duke John was in charge, to the east Okko, Sibet and the city of Groningen. All the chieftains who had fled during the war were allowed to return and also had their belongings returned. Despite all the good intentions, this arrangement was not a success. Sikke Sjaarda soon caused problems because he was involved with pirates. Furthermore, the Skieringers got their fill of their involvement with John of Bavaria, who continued to build up his power in Friesland and had fortifications built in various places. The Skieringers revolted against him en masse, the Hollanders were surrounded and besieged everywhere and on 18 January 1422 the Frisians succeeded in taking Lemmer, an important stronghold of John of Bavaria in Frisia. With this, the Duke lost almost all his authority in Friesland. Like the Skieringers, the Allies did not want John to become too powerful and peace talks were soon resumed.

=== Peace of Groningen ===
On 1 February 1422, after nine years of war, peace was finally concluded by all parties involved. The treaty was signed by ninety-four chieftains. One of the most important points laid down in the treaty was the preservation of Frisian freedom; foreign lords had to be barred from Frisia.

== Skirmishes and battles ==
- 1413 – Capture of Emden
- 1415 – Groninger Reversal
- 1417 – Battle of Okswerderzijl
- 1418 – Battle of Dokkum (1418)
- 1419 – Battle of Miedum
- 1420 – Battle of the Palesloot
- 1420 – Battle of Sloten (1420)
