= List of wars involving the Netherlands =

This is a list of wars involving the Kingdom of the Netherlands and its predecessor states since 1795. These predecessors include:

- United Provinces, or Dutch Republic (1581–1795): see List of wars involving the Dutch Republic
- Batavian Republic (1795–1806)
- Kingdom of Holland (1806–1810)
- Sovereign Principality of the United Netherlands (1813–1815)
- United Kingdom of the Netherlands (1815–1839)
- Kingdom of the Netherlands (1839–present)
- For earlier wars, see List of wars in the Low Countries until 1560
- For simultaneous wars in the south, see
  - List of wars in the southern Low Countries (1560–1829) – includes wars on the present territory of Belgium and Luxembourg, including the Southern Netherlands (Spanish Netherlands & Austrian Netherlands), the Principality of Liège, the Princely Abbey of Stavelot-Malmedy, the Prince-Bishopric of Cambrésis and the Imperial City of Cambray, the Duchy of Bouillon and smaller states.
  - List of wars involving Belgium (1830–present)
  - List of wars involving Luxembourg (1890–present)

== Batavian Republic (1795–1806) ==
| Conflict | Combatant 1 | Combatant 2 | Result |
|---|---|---|---|
| War of the Second Coalition (1799-1802) | (France) French Republic; Spain (Poland) Polish Legions; Denmark–Norway French client republics: Batavian Republic; Helvetic Republic; (Kingdom of Italy (Napoleonic)) Cisalpine Republic; (Kingdom of Italy (Napoleonic)) Roman Republic; (Kingdom of Italy (Napoleonic)) Parthenopaean Republic | (Holy Roman Empire) Austria; Russia; Great Britain; Ottoman Empire; Portugal; Two Sicilies (Kingdom of France) French Royalists | Victory Treaty of Amiens: General French victory; Britain recognises the French Republic; Cape Colony returned to the Batavian Republic; British withdrawal from Egypt; French withdrawal from the Papal States; Trinidad and Tobago ceded from France; Ceylon ceded from the Batavian Republic |
| Third Xhosa-Dutch War (1799–1803) | Dutch Republic | Xhosa militia Khoikhoi militia | Stalemate: The Xhosa were allowed to stay in Zuurveld. |
| War of the Third Coalition (1803-1806) | (France) French Empire (Netherlands) Batavia (Kingdom of Italy (Napoleonic)) Italy (Kingdom of Italy (Napoleonic)) Etruria; Spain; Bavaria (Kingdom of Württemberg) Württemberg | Austrian Empire; Russian Empire (Kingdom of the Two Sicilies) Naples and Sicily; Portugal; Great Britain; Sweden | Victory Treaty of Pressburg: Consolidation of the French Empire; Dissolution of the Holy Roman Empire; Creation of the Confederation of the Rhine; Hostilities resume few months later with the formation of a Fourth Coalition against France |
| Padri War (1803-1838) | Adats; Netherlands | Padris | Victory |

== Kingdom of Holland (1806–1810) ==
| Conflict | Combatant 1 | Combatant 2 | Result |
|---|---|---|---|
| Franco-Swedish War (1805–1810) | France (Spain) Spanish Empire (Netherlands) Holland | Sweden; United Kingdom; Prussia | Victory |
| Ashanti–Fante War (1806–1807) | Ashanti Empire; Batavian Republic | Fante Confederacy; United Kingdom | Victory |
| War of the Fourth Coalition (1806–1807) | (France) French Empire; French satellites: Confederation of the Rhine: Bavaria; Württemberg; Saxony; Polish Legions; Napoleonic Italy; Kingdom of Naples; (Kingdom of Italy (Napoleonic)) Etruria; (Netherlands) Holland; Spain; (Switzerland) Swiss Confederation | Prussia; Russia; United Kingdom; Saxony; Sweden; Sicily | Victory Treaties of Tilsit: Prussia lost one half of its territory; Creation of the Duchy of Warsaw; Franco-Russian alliance; Promulgation of the Continental System; Hostilities resume in 1808 with the commencement of the Peninsular War and expanded in 1809 with the formation of a Fifth Coalition against France |
| Second Tondano War (1808–1809) | (Netherlands) Holland: (Netherlands) Dutch East Indies | Minahasan militia | Victory |
| War of the Fifth Coalition (1809) | (France) French Empire; French satellites: Confederation of the Rhine: Bavaria; Saxony; Württemberg; Westphalia; Napoleonic Italy; Naples; Switzerland; (Netherlands) Holland | Austria; Hungary; Tyrol (in rebellion against Bavaria); United Kingdom; Spain (Kingdom of the Two Sicilies) Sicily; Sardinia; Black Brunswickers | Victory Treaty of Schönbrunn: Franco-Austrian Alliance; Napoléon marries Marie Louise of Austria; Hostilities in the Peninsular War maintained; General hostilities across Europe resume in 1812 with the French Invasion of Russia and expand in 1813 with the formation of a Sixth Coalition against France |

== Sovereign Principality of the United Netherlands (1813–1815) ==
| Conflict | Combatant 1 | Combatant 2 | Result |
|---|---|---|---|
| War of the Sixth Coalition (1813–1814) | Sixth Coalition: Russia (already at war); United Kingdom (already at war); Spain (already at war); Portugal (already at war); Sweden (3 March); Mecklenburg-Schwerin (14 March); Prussia (17 March); Sardinia; Sicily; After Pläswitz (June–August 1813): Austria (12 August); Bavaria (8 Oct.); After Leipzig (October 1813): Saxony (18 Oct.); Württemberg (18 Oct.); Baden (mid-November); Principality of the Netherlands (21 Nov.); Liechtenstein; After January 1814 Denmark | France: Duchy of Warsaw (Note: Duchy of Warsaw as a state was in effect fully occupied by Russian and Prussian forces by May 1813, although most Poles remained loyal to Napoleon.); Italy; Naples; Until January 1814: Confederation of the Rhine (Note: Many member states of the Confederation of the Rhine defected after Battle of Leipzig.); Denmark–Norway | Victory: Napoleon abdicates and is captured; Future of the Low Countries determined at Congress of Vienna (1814–15) |

== United Kingdom of the Netherlands (1815–1839) ==
| Conflict | Combatant 1 | Combatant 2 | Result |
|---|---|---|---|
| Hundred Days (1815) War of the Seventh Coalition | United Kingdom; Prussia; Hanover; German Confederation; Austria; Russia; Sweden; Netherlands; Spain; Portugal; Sardinia; Kingdom of the Two Sicilies; Tuscany | (France) French Empire; Kingdom of Naples | Victory Treaty of Paris: General French defeat; Restoration of the House of Bourbon; Abolition of the slave trade (all signatories); ₣100,000,000 compensation from France |
| Bombardment of Algiers (1816) | United Kingdom; United Netherlands | (Ottoman Empire) Regency of Algiers | Victory: 3000 slaves freed. |
| First expedition to Palembang (1819) | Dutch Empire | Palembang Sultanate | Defeat |
| Second expedition to Palembang (1821) | Dutch Empire | Palembang Sultanate | Victory |
| Expedition to the West Coast of Borneo (1823) | Dutch Empire | Chinese Indonesian rebels | Victory |
| First Bone War (1824–1825) | Dutch Empire | Sulawesian militia | Victory |
| Java War (1825-1830) | Dutch Empire; Pro-Dutch Javanese | Rebel forces of Prince Diponegoro; Chinese mercenaries | Victory: Diponegoro deported to Makassar |
| Katamanso War (1826) | Denmark; United Kingdom; Dutch Empire | Ashanti Empire | Victory |
| Belgian Revolution (1830-1831) | Dutch Empire | Belgian rebels Supported by: France | Defeat: The main European powers recognized Belgium's de facto independence from the Kingdom of the Netherlands. |
| Dutch expedition on the west coast of Sumatra (1831) | Dutch Empire | Aceh Sultanate | Victory |
| First Sumatran expedition (1832) | United States; Dutch Empire | Chiefdom of Kuala Batee | Victory |
| Dutch–Ahanta War (1837-1839) | Dutch Empire | Ahanta Kingdom | Victory: Ahanta becomes a Dutch protectorate |
| Second Sumatran expedition (1838) | United States; Dutch Empire | Chiefdom of Kuala Batee | Victory |

== Netherlands (1839–present) ==
| Conflict | Combatant 1 | Combatant 2 | Result |
|---|---|---|---|
| Dutch intervention in northern Bali (1846) | Dutch Empire | Buleleng | Victory |
| Dutch intervention in Bali (1849-1850) | Dutch Empire; Lombok | Buleleng; Jembrana; Klungkung | Victory: Dutch control of Northern Bali. |
| Palembang Highlands Expeditions (1851–1859) | Dutch Empire | Forces of the Sultan of Palembang | Victory |
| Expedition against the Chinese in Montrado (1854-1855) | Dutch Empire; Pro-Dutch Indonesians | Pro-Chinese Indonesian rebels (Qing dynasty) China | Victory |
| Nias Expedition (1855-1864) | Dutch Empire | Nias | Victory |
| Dutch intervention in Bali (1858) | Dutch Empire | Buleleng rebels | Victory |
| Second Bone War (1859–1860) | Dutch Empire | Sulawesian militia | Victory |
| Banjarmasin War (1859–1863) | Dutch Empire | Sultanate of Banjarmasin | Victory |
| Shimonoseki Campaign (1863–1864) | Dutch Empire; British Empire (France) French Empire; United States | Chōshū Domain | Victory |
| Pasoemah Expedition (1864–1868) | Dutch Empire | South Sumatra | Victory |
| Dutch Gold Coast expedition of 1869–70 (1869-1870) | Dutch Empire | Local rulers | Victory: Dutch Gold Coast sold to Britain in 1872 |
| Aceh War (1873-1904) | Dutch Empire | Aceh Sultanate; Acehnese religious ulama Thai and Chinese mercenaries | Victory: Imposition of Dutch rule on Aceh.; Aceh is annexed into the Dutch East Indies. |
| Batak War (1878-1907) | Dutch Empire | Batak Kingdom | Victory |
| Mandor rebellion (1884-1885) | Dutch Empire | Lanfang Republic; Qing dynasty Dayak and Chinese Indonesian militia | Victory: Disestablishment of the Lanfang Republic. |
| Jambi uprising (1885) | Dutch Empire | Jambi | Victory |
| Edi Expedition (1890) | Dutch Empire | Aceh militia | Victory |
| Dutch intervention in Lombok and Karangasem (1894) | Dutch Empire; Eastern Sasak | Lombok Mataram; Western Sasak | Victory: Dutch control of Lombok and Karangasem. |
| Pedir Expedition (1897-1898) | Dutch Empire | Aceh militia | Victory |
| Siege of the International Legations part of the Boxer Rebellion (1900) | British Empire; United States; France; Russia; Germany; Italy; Austria-Hungary; Japan; Belgium; Dutch Empire; Spain | Qing Dynasty; Yìhéquán | Victory |
| Unrest in Java (1900-1907) | Dutch Empire | Peasant rebels Lone-wolf robbers arsonists | Victory |
| Merauke uprising (1902) | Dutch Empire | Marind rebels | Victory |
| Campaigns against Dayak (Location: Kalimantan) (1902-1907) | Dutch Empire | Dayak rebels | Victory |
| Kerinci Expedition (1903) | Dutch Empire | Kerinci | Victory |
| Actions on Yapen (1903) | Dutch Empire | Tribes of Yapen | Victory |
| Resistance on Tidore (1904) | Dutch Empire | Tidore | Victory |
| South Sulawesi expedition (1904-1905) | Dutch Empire | Bone; Luwu; Wajo | Victory |
| Dutch intervention in Bali (1906) | Dutch Empire | Badung; Tabanan; Klungkung | Victory: Dutch control of southern Bali. |
| Dutch–Venezuelan crisis of 1908 (1908) | Dutch Empire | Venezuela | Victory: Overthrow of Cipriano Castro |
| Dutch intervention in Bali (1908) | Dutch Empire | Balinese rebels | Victory |
| World War II (1940–1945) | Soviet Union; United States; United Kingdom; China; France; Poland; Canada; Australia; New Zealand; India; South Africa; Yugoslavia; Greece; Denmark; Norway; Netherlands; Belgium; Luxembourg; Czechoslovakia; Brazil; Mexico; Ethiopia Italy (from 1943); Romania (from 1944); Bulgaria (from 1944); Finland (from 1944) | Germany; Japan; Italy (until 1943) Italian Social Republic (from 23 Sep. 1943); Hungary; Romania (until 1944); Bulgaria (until 1944); Finland (1941-1944); Thailand; Manchukuo; Mengjiang; Croatia; Slovakia | Victory: Collapse of the Third Reich; Fall of Japanese and Italian Empires; Creation of the United Nations; Emergence of the United States and the Soviet Union as superpowers; Beginning of the Cold War |
| Indonesian National Revolution (1945–1949) | Dutch Empire | Indonesia: PDRI; TNI; (Japan) Japanese volunteers (from 1946); Supported by: Soviet Union | Indonesian political victory Dutch military victory: Indonesia secured its independence; Dutch recognised United States of Indonesia in Dutch-Indonesian Round Table Conference |
| APRA coup d'état (1950) | Indonesia; Netherlands | Legion of the Just Ruler (APRA) | Victory |
| Korean War (1950–1953) | South Korea; United States; United Kingdom; Netherlands; United Nations | North Korea; China; Soviet Union | Ceasefire: Communist invasions of South Korea repelled; Subsequent UN invasion of North Korea repelled; Subsequent communist invasion of South Korea repelled |
| Operation Trikora (1961–1962) | Dutch Empire | Indonesia; Air and naval support by: Soviet Union | Indonesian political victory Military stalemate: New York Agreement Western New Guinea ceded to the United Nations. |
| Gulf War (1990–1991) | Kuwait; United States; United Kingdom; Saudi Arabia; France; Egypt; Syria; Netherlands; Other Allies | Iraq | Victory: Kuwait regains its independence |
| Operation Krivaja '95 (6–11 July 1995) | Netherlands; Ukraine | Republika Srpska; Serb Volunteer Guard; Scorpions paramilitary unit (Federal Republic of Yugoslavia) Police, volunteers and paramilitaries from Yugoslavia (Greece) Greek volunteers (Russia) Russian volunteers | Defeat: Decisive Bosnian Serb victory; Beginning of the Srebrenica massacre |
| Operation Deliberate Force (30 August – 20 September 1995) | NATO; United States; United Kingdom; Netherlands; France; Germany; Italy; France; Turkey | Republika Srpska | Victory: Dayton Accords; Internal partition of Bosnia and Herzegovina according to the Dayton Accords; Deployment of NATO-led IFOR to oversee the peace agreement; Massive civilian casualties for the Bosniak ethnic group |
| Kosovo War (1998–1999) | Kosovo Liberation Army; United States; United Kingdom; Netherlands; France; Canada; Denmark; Germany; Italy | FR Yugoslavia | Victory: Kumanovo Treaty; Yugoslav forces pull out of Kosovo; United Nations Resolution 1244; NATO intervention; KLA veterans join the UÇPMB, starting the Preševo insurgency; Bulldozer Revolution in 2000 |
| War in Afghanistan (2001–2021) | Afghanistan; United States; United Kingdom; Canada; Netherlands; Germany; Italy; France; Denmark; Poland; Romania; Turkey; Australia; Spain; ISAF | (Afghanistan) Taliban al-Qaeda; Haqqani network Hezb-e-Islami Gulbuddin; United Tajik Opposition; IMU; Other groups | Defeat: Fall of Taliban régime in 2001; Osama bin Laden killed; Taliban retakes Kabul; Return of Taliban régime in 2021 |
| Iraq War (2003–2011) | United States; United Kingdom; Iraq after the fall of Saddam Hussein; Australia; Poland; Netherlands; Denmark; Iraqi Kurdistan | Iraq under Saddam Hussein Sunni insurgents: al-Qaeda in Iraq (2004–2006); Islamic State of Iraq (2006–2011); Islamic Army of Iraq; Ansar al-Sunnah; Shia insurgents: Mahdi Army; Special Groups; Asa'ib Ahl al-Haq; Others | Victory: Fall of Ba'athist rule in Iraq; Occupation of southern Iraq; Dutch withdrawal in 2009, conflict ended in 2011 |
| Operation Ocean Shield (2009–15 December 2016); Operation Atalanta (2009–present) | EU; NATO; Netherlands | (Somalia) Somali Pirates | Victory: NATO and EU operations being conducted.; Action of 5 April 2010; Task Force Barracuda: sabotage of 5 Somali piracy mother ships |
| Libyan Civil War (2011) | (Libya) Anti-Gaddafi forces United States; United Kingdom; France; Denmark; Netherlands; Italy; Canada several Arab League states Sweden | Libyan Arab Jamahiriya: Armed forces; Pro-Gaddafi Militia; Foreign mercenaries | Victory: Fall of Gaddafi regime; Muammar Gaddafi killed; National Transitional Council take control |
| Dutch military intervention against ISIL; Dutch involvement in the Syrian Civil War (2014–2019) | Netherlands | Islamic State of Iraq and the Levant; Boko Haram al-Nusra Front; Khorasan Ahrar ash-Sham | Victory: Operation Inherent Resolve is in play.; 2014 Iraqi intervention against ISIL; Airstrikes on ISIL and al-Qaeda affiliates positions in Iraq and Syria; Spillover of the Syrian Civil War: American-led intervention in the Syrian Civil War |

- War of succession
- War of conquest (territorial control)
- Religious war (including the European wars of religion)
- Economic war (including colonial wars)
- Revolt or rebellion (political)
