= List of wars involving Luxembourg =

This article is a list of wars and conflicts involving Luxembourg since its full independence from the United Kingdom of the Netherlands in 1890.

Start	Finish	Name of Conflict	Belligerents (excluding Luxembourg)		Outcome
Start	Finish	Name of Conflict	Allies	Enemies	Outcome
1914	1918	World War I	Allies: French Third Republic; British Empire; Kingdom of Belgium; Russian Empire (1914–17); United States (1917–18) and others	Central Powers German Empire; Austria-Hungary; Ottoman Empire; Kingdom of Bulgaria (1915–18)	German occupation of Luxembourg between 1914 and 1918; Allied victory: Grand Duchess Marie-Adélaïde is forced to abdicate due to her pro-German attitude (9 January 1919); Monarchy survives, despite strong republican and pro-Belgian opposition; Treaty of Versailles (art. 40–41): German privileges in Luxembourg repealed
1940	1945	World War II	Allies	Axis powers	German occupation of Luxembourg (1940–1945); Allied victory: Benelux founded (1944); Benelux countries retrieve pre-war territories
1950	1953	Korean War	South Korea; United Nations (UN Resolution 84) USA; UK; Australia; Belgium; Canada; France; Philippines; Colombia; Kingdom of Greece; Luxembourg; Netherlands; New Zealand; South Africa; Thailand; Turkey	North Korea China; Soviet Union	Ceasefire
1998	1999	Kosovo War	Kosovo Liberation Army Albania; NATO force	Federal Republic of Yugoslavia	NATO victory: United Nations Interim Administration Mission in Kosovo
2001	2021	War in Afghanistan	Northern Alliance (2001); Islamic Republic of Afghanistan; NATO ( ISAF, RS)	Islamic Emirate of Afghanistan (2001); Taliban	Defeat: Fall of Taliban régime; Taliban insurgency; Taliban regains power in 2021

== See also ==
- List of wars in the Low Countries until 1560 – includes wars on the present territory of Luxembourg until 1560.
- List of wars in the southern Low Countries (1560–1829) – includes wars on the present territory of Luxembourg, including the Southern Netherlands (Spanish Netherlands & Austrian Netherlands), the Principality of Liège, the Princely Abbey of Stavelot-Malmedy, the Prince-Bishopric of Cambrésis and the Imperial City of Cambray, the Duchy of Bouillon and smaller states.
- List of wars involving the Netherlands (1815–1839) – includes colonial wars in which Luxembourg participated in personal union with the United Kingdom of the Netherlands
