= Van Montfoort =

Van Montfoort is a surname. Notable people with the surname include:

- Anthonie Blocklandt van Montfoort (1533/1534–1583), Dutch painter
- Jan III van Montfoort (c. 1448–1522), Dutch noble
