= Dutch–Zamorin conflicts =

Wars in Calicut, India between 1666 and 1758

Dutch-Zamorin Conflicts
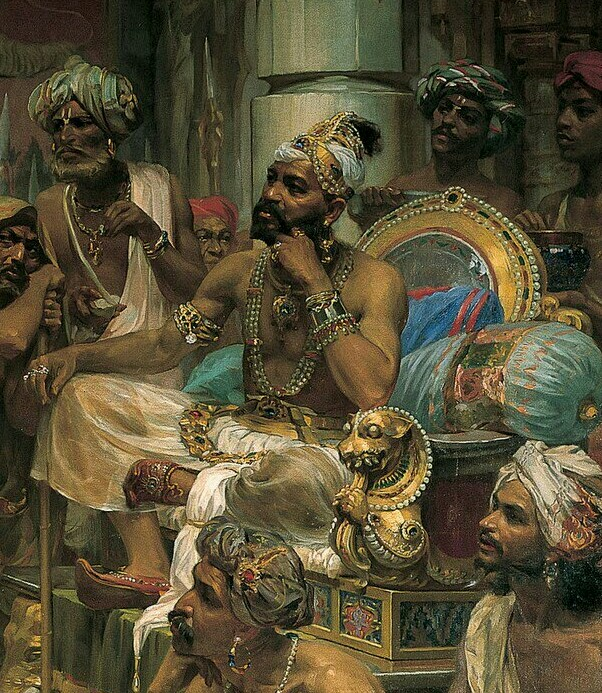
- Zamorin of Calicut
Date	1666–1758
Location	Present-day Kerala, India and Indian Ocean
Result	Dutch victory

Belligerents
Dutch Republic; Dutch East India Company	Zamorin of Calicut; East India Company; Kandy (1753–1758); Supported by: Danish India

Commanders and leaders
(Dutch Republic) Rijcklof van Goens (Dutch Republic) Casparus de Jong	Zamorins of Calicut

The Dutch-Zamorin conflicts refer to a series of armed hostilities and territorial disputes that occurred during the 17th and 18th centuries between the Dutch East India Company and the Zamorin, the ruler of Calicut in present-day Kerala, India.

The conflicts occurred in 1666–1668, 1670–1672, 1701–1710, 1715–1718, and 1753–1758. This period of conflict was part of the more considerable competition between European powers for control over trade routes and valuable resources in the Indian Ocean region. Despite these conflicts, the Dutch and Zamorin had overall good relations, and each power-assisted the other militarily.

== Background ==
The Dutch East India Company was a powerful trading entity established in the early 17th century, primarily aimed at expanding trade and securing lucrative spice trade routes in the East Indies. On the other hand, the Zamorin was a significant regional power in the Malabar Coast of India, and Calicut (now Kozhikode) was one of the prominent trading centres in the region. Over time, the Dutch gained the upper hand in these conflicts. Their naval prowess and superior firepower allowed them to seize key trading posts and control crucial trade routes. The Dutch also managed to secure favourable trade agreements and exclusive trading rights with various regional rulers, weakening Zamorin's position and influence.

== Hostilities ==
=== 1666–1668 War ===
Between 1666 and 1668, the Dutch and the Zamorin were involved in a war in the Indian Ocean region. This conflict arose due to both parties' competing interests and territorial ambitions during the 17th century. Before 1666, the Dutch sought to expand their territorial holdings in India. In 1666, they launched an invasion of the lands around Crangore, specifically Anchi Kamal, to gain more influence in the region. This invasion had adverse implications for the Zamorin, who found it necessary to retaliate by dispatching raiding parties and expeditions against the Dutch forces. However, most of these countermeasures were unsuccessful as they were repelled by the Dutch, who demonstrated their military strength and defensive capabilities and successfully defended their territory and expanded.

=== 1670–1672 War ===
As hostilities escalated, Van Goes, a Dutch commander, led an army of 900 troops into the territory of the Zamorin. In the ensuing battle, the Zamorin's forces suffered over 300 casualties, including the severe injury of the king's wife, and were ultimately defeated. The Dutch army, in contrast, experienced relatively minor losses and returned to their stronghold in Crangur. Undeterred, the Zamorin launched a counterattack on the Dutch fort at Crangur with 800 men, but their efforts were unsuccessful, and the Dutch successfully repelled the assault. Recognizing the growing strength of the Dutch forces, the Zamorin launched an attack on the Tower of Cranganur with 4,000 men against the Dutch's 11,000 defenders. Surprisingly, the Dutch emerged victorious in this battle as well. Faced with this series of defeats, the Zamorin was eager to seek peace and finally signed a peace treaty with the Dutch on 6 February 1672. The treaty heavily favoured the Dutch, granting them favourable terms, and even ceded the region of Chetwai to Dutch control. This period of conflict and its eventual resolution through a peace treaty had significant implications for the power dynamics in the area. It shaped the relationship between the Dutch and the Zamorin during that time. During this war, the famous Cheraman sword was burnt in a surprise attack by the Dutch at Kodungallur (1670).

=== 1701-1710 ===
Between 1701 and 1710, the Dutch and the Zamorin engaged in a significant and devastating war. The conflict was triggered when the Zamorin attempted to invade Cochin. The Dutch opposed this move, as they were wary of the Zamorin becoming too powerful in the region. Consequently, skirmishes ensued as both sides contested their territorial claims. As the war progressed, the Zamorin faced difficulties maintaining their offensive, and the Dutch demonstrated their military strength. After protracted hostilities and realizing the challenges in capturing Cochin, the Zamorin eventually abandoned their efforts and sought a peaceful resolution. They communicated their willingness to achieve peace to the Dutch by sending a letter proposing negotiations. The war between the Dutch and the Zamorin during this period had significant implications for the region's power dynamics and territorial control. The eventual willingness of the Zamorin to seek peace reflected the exhaustion of their military campaign and the desire to find a diplomatic resolution to the conflict.

=== 1715–1718 War ===
When the war started in 1715, the Dutch prepared for a conflict with the Zamorin. Their anger was directed not only towards the Zamorin but also the British East India Company, who secretly supported the Zamorin. Following instructions from the supreme council of Batavia, the Dutch mobilized their fleet and troops under the command of William Bakker Jacobs and moved towards the Malabar region. The Dutch fleet initiated a siege along the shores, and during this time, they captured a ship flying the British flag. The Zamorin suffered significant losses during the hostilities. The Dutch successfully captured the areas of Pappinivattam and Chettuva, but the British stopped assisting the Zamorin. Subsequently, negotiations began for a truce, resulting in a new agreement. According to this agreement, the Dutch obtained the islands of Chettuva, and the Zamorin was compelled to pay a war indemnity of 85,000 gold coins. As part of the agreement, a person named Dharmoth Panikker, who was on the side of the Zamorin and had captured a fort, was dismissed from the service of the Zamorin, and his properties were confiscated and given to the Dutch East India Company. Following this agreement, the Dutch significantly increased their influence and military prowess in Kerala, establishing themselves as a formidable regional force. This event shaped the power dynamics and relations between the Dutch, the Zamorin, and the British in the Malabar region during that period.

=== 1753-1758 War ===
The war between the Dutch and the Zamorin in Kerala began after Frederik Cunes arrived in the region and made peace with Travancore, which offended the Zamorin. As the Dutch became more neutral in India and stopped supporting the Zamorin while still receiving assistance from them, the Zamorin grew increasingly discontented and eventually initiated the war. The conflict started with a surprise attack by the Zamorin on Dutch settlers, resulting in skirmishes. When the Zamorin attacked another area with 2,000 soldiers, the Dutch sent 210 soldiers to defend it, and the Zamorin's forces retreated. However, the Dutch faced challenges, with the Zamorin nearly completing the invasion of Paracherry until it was halted by Dutch intervention. The Zamorin sought peace with the Dutch, but negotiations were marred by an incident where Zamorin envoys sent to a Dutch fort at Crangore were killed, leading to frustration on both sides. The Kingdom of Ceylon sided with the Zamorin, and the Zamorin sought assistance from Travancore.

Interestingly, Travancore assisted both parties, with their commander adopting a diplomatic stance to avoid hostilities. Subsequently, the Zamorin attempted to invade Cettuwaye, but the combined Dutch and Chettuwaye forces drove them out. The Zamorin then successfully invaded the Kingdom of Cochin, surprising the Dutch command in Malabar.

In response to intelligence that the Zamorin might attack their possessions in Malabar, the Dutch accepted a letter of peace from the Zamorin while bolstering their forces. Peace negotiations between the two sides did not lead to favourable terms, and the war continued. With reinforcements from Batavia, the Dutch were well-prepared for battle and regained control of Chettuwaye and Puthanchira. The Zamorin faced defeat in every engagement, leading to their immediate desire for peace. They ceded Madilagam, Puthanchira, Chettuwaye, and Pappinvattam to the Dutch and agreed to pay tribute to them as part of the peace agreement.
