= Treaty of The Hague (1795) =

1795 France–Netherlands treaty

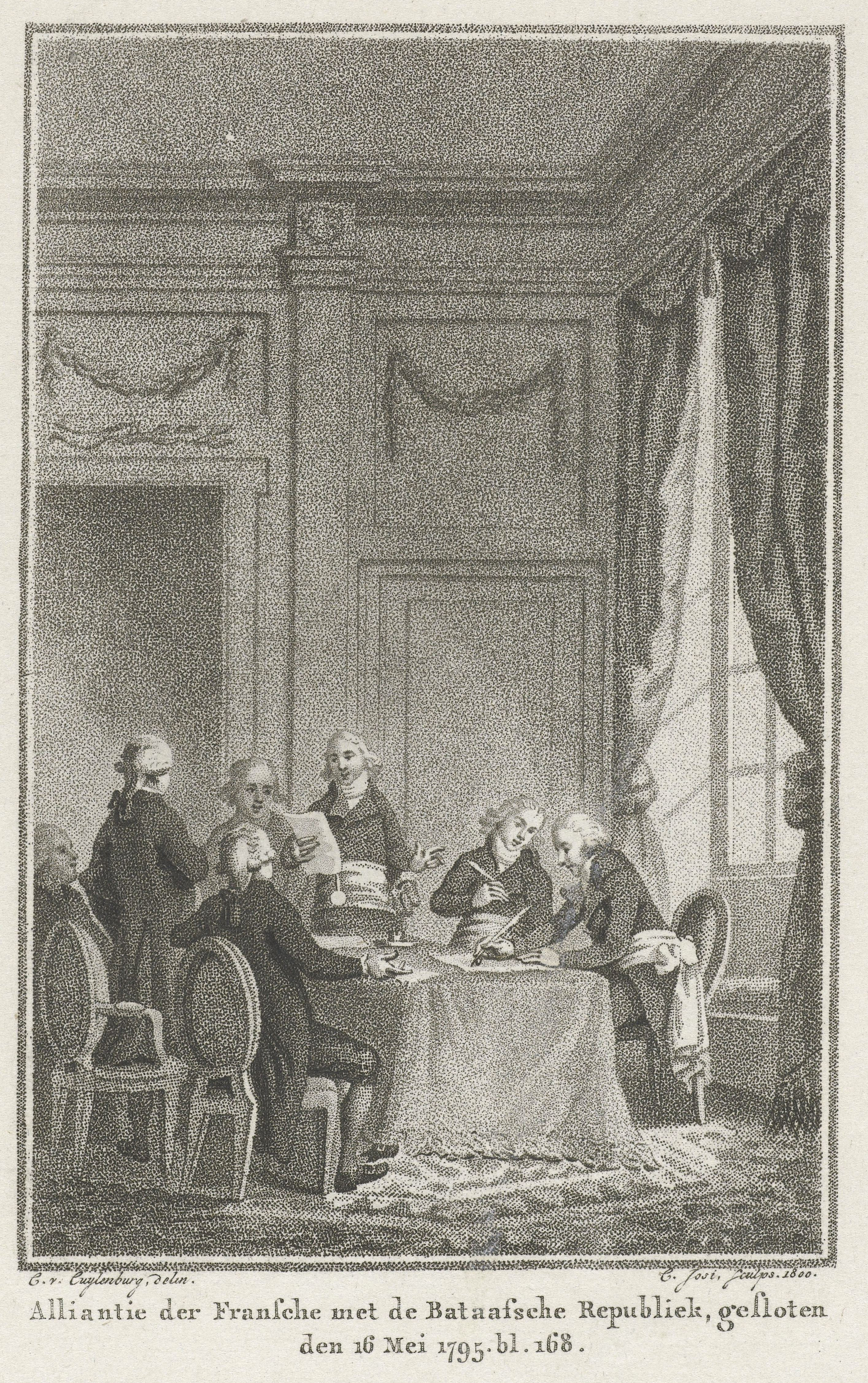
Conclusion of alliance between France and the Batavian Republic, 1795

The Treaty of The Hague (also known as the Hedges Treaty) was signed on May 16, 1795, between representatives of the French First Republic and the Batavian Republic. Based on the terms of the treaty, the Batavian Republic ceded to France the territories of Maastricht, Venlo, and Zeelandic Flanders. Moreover, the accord established a defensive alliance between the two nations, which rapidly involved the Netherlands in the war against Great Britain and Austria. Furthermore, the Dutch agreed to pay an indemnity of 100 million guilders for their part in the War of the First Coalition, and to provide the French Republic a large loan against a low rate of interest. The "barrier forts" in the former Austrian Netherlands were dismantled. The port of Vlissingen was to be placed under a co-dominion. Finally, in a secret clause, the Dutch agreed to pay for a French army of occupation of 25,000 till the war was ended.

The treaty brought the Revolutionary War between France and the Dutch Republic to an end and saw a regenerated Batavian Republic re-enter the war on the side of France.

== See also ==
- List of treaties
