= Van Bronckhorst =

Van Bronckhorst is a Dutch surname.

It may refer to:

- Giovanni van Bronckhorst (born 1975), Dutch former footballer
- Jan Gerritsz van Bronckhorst (1603–1661), Dutch painter
- Johannes van Bronckhorst (1648–1727), Dutch painter
- Pieter van Bronckhorst (1588–1661), Dutch painter
