= Battle of Leuven (891) =

891 battle

Coordinates: 50°53′N 4°42′E

Date	September 891
Location	Leuven, East Francia (modern-day Flanders, Belgium)
Result	Frankish victory

Belligerents
East Francia	Vikings

Commanders and leaders
Arnulf of Carinthia	Sigfried †; Gotfried †

Casualties and losses
Unknown	Thousands killed 16 standards captured

The Battle of Leuven, also called the Battle of the River Dyle, was fought in September 891 between East Francia and the Vikings. The existence of this battle is known through several different chronicles, including the Annales Fuldenses and the Anglo-Saxon Chronicle. The Battle of the Dyle occurred near the present-day location of the city of Leuven in Belgium. In the 880s the Vikings established a camp there that they used as a base of operations from which to launch raids into the fractured Frankish kingdom. Efforts to verify the report of the battle from the Annales Fuldenses, specifically the huge loss of life on the Viking side, have been hindered by the lack of archaeological excavations in Belgium.

== Background ==
There is some debate about the catalyst for the renewed Viking assault on the continent more generally and East Francia specifically at the end of the 9th century. According to the Chronicon of Regino of Prüm, the Vikings were forced to abandon their assault on Britain, which they had been attacking at least since the 8th century. Here the Vikings particularly focused their attention on Ireland, and once they established their presence there they began launching raids into neighboring England and across the channel into Europe. The Viking raids continued throughout much of Europe for much of the next couple of centuries. In 866, the Danish ‘Great Heathen Army’ began a major assault on England, whose fractured kingdoms were initially easy targets. They quickly took over East Anglia, Northumbria, and Mercia, but the king of the West Saxons, Alfred the Great, slowed their advance. In 878, at the Battle of Edington, Alfred defeated a prominent Danish leader, and the main force of Vikings moved from England to the continent where they continued raiding all over, even besieging the city of Paris in 885–886. Charlemagne's great-grandson, Charles the Fat, paid them a ransom of silver and sent them off to Burgundy where they continued raiding and plundering, even sacking the abbey of Luxeuil.

Regino's Chronicon certainly reinforces this image, stating that after two decisive defeats in Britain, the Vikings moved their forces across the channel and began raiding and plundering the continent with renewed vigor. Simon Coupland and Janet Nelson suggest that the defeat in England coupled with the unique conditions in Francia in the mid to late 9th century made that part of Europe a prime target for the Vikings. Louis the Stammerer died in April 879, leaving to his two young sons a kingdom that quickly erupted in turmoil. Frankish nobles supported differing contenders for the throne, and their internal divisions left them vulnerable to attacks across the channel from the migrating and opportunistic Danes, who took advantage of the situation. Whatever the reasons, it is clear that the battle took place during a period of renewed and concentrated raiding by the Vikings on the European continent, centered on the fracturing Carolingian Empire.

The lead-up to the battle occurred during the summer of 891. While King Arnulf was off on the Bavarian frontier dealing with the Slavs, the Vikings met a Frankish force in battle on 26 June. The Franks were initially unsure about what their opponents’ aims were: would the Vikings make next for Cologne, head for Trier, or would they flee when they heard that a Frankish army had assembled to meet them in battle? The Franks eventually marched out and drew up in battle lines after crossing a stream called the Geule, then began discussing forming parties to scout their enemy. In the midst of these discussions the Vikings’ scouts happened upon the Franks. The Frankish army pursued the scouts without waiting for instruction from their leaders and eventually ran into the assembled Viking infantry in a nearby village, which easily repelled the disorganized Frankish attackers. Once their cavalry had been drawn to the battle, the Vikings easily defeated the Franks, who retreated, only to be cut down by their Viking pursuers. The Vikings then proceeded to raid and plunder, taking their captured booty back to their ships.

Part of King Arnulf's motivation for going to battle against the Vikings, according to Regino, was to seek revenge for his fallen men and to restore the image of the Franks, which had been severely damaged by their flight during the battle. Therefore, he assembled a substantial number of men and went to meet the Vikings in battle at the Dyle River, where the Danes were entrenched.

== Battle ==
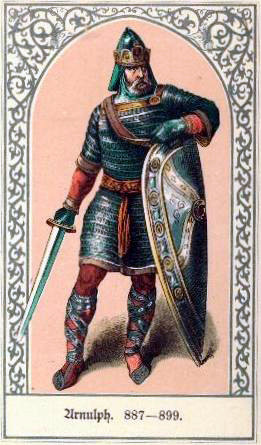
Arnulf of Carinthia commanded a rear guard of mounted soldiers to protect against any surprise attacks the Vikings might launch from the nearby swamp.

The Viking force had strengthened their position and "constructed a fortification of wood and piled-up earth in their usual manner." Moreover, a swamp protected one flank of their fortifications and the Dyle the other, giving them a decided advantage. Apparently the Frankish army came upon the Vikings rather unexpectedly. Regino records how the Vikings, knowing their superior position, taunted the Frankish contingent, throwing the recent battle at Geule in their faces and promising this battle would end in the same manner. Arnulf was enraged but hesitated because of the enemy's better position. Finally, he ordered his cavalry to dismount and join the phalanx of foot soldiers that formed part of his army.

His plan was to advance over the open field toward the Danish fortifications. Arnulf commanded a rear guard of mounted soldiers to protect against any surprise attacks the Vikings might launch from the nearby swamp. The Frankish forces were overwhelmingly successful, especially once they had driven the Vikings past their fortifications. Left with nowhere to retreat, the Danes were cut down by the Franks or drowned in the Dyle as they fled the battle. The Viking leaders Sigfried and Gotfried were slain during the battle, and 16 standards were captured.

== Aftermath ==
After the battle a period of relative peace ensued in Francia, although the cause of this peace depends on the source. For example, some chroniclers, biased toward the Frankish side, state that it was the incredibly decisive defeat, where virtually all of the Danish forces were massacred, that stymied Viking raiding in the region for the next few years. Less biased chronicles, such as the Annals of St. Vaast, state that the real reason for the Viking departure was famine, which ravaged the countryside in 892. According to these Annals, the Vikings took to their ships to escape the famine and subsequently left the region in peace.

These reports fail to represent the situation realistically, however. Viking raids continued in Francia and the rest of Europe for many decades. Merely a year, for instance, after the Battle of the Dyle, the Vikings again crossed the Meuse and raided the land of the Ripuarian Franks. By 896, Viking raiders are again mentioned as active in the Loire and Oise valleys, and bands continued raiding in the Seine basin and northern Aquitaine into the early 10th century. Rather than completely subduing the Viking raiders, the Battle of the Dyle merely ensured a period of short-lived peace in Francia.

== Bibliography ==
- The Annals of Fulda. (Manchester Medieval series, Ninth-Century Histories, Volume II.) Reuter, Timothy (trans.) Manchester: Manchester University Press, 1992.
- Apelblat, Mose (September 8, 2016). "Was Leuven Founded by Vikings? Lost History and Legend". The Brussels Times.
- Bachrach, Bernard S. and David S. Warfare in Medieval Europe: c.400-c.1453. New York: Routledge, 2017.
- Coupland, Simon and Janet Nelson. “The Vikings on the Continent,” in History Today 38, no.12 (1988): 12–19.
- Bradbury, Jim (1992). The Medieval Siege. Woodbridge, Suffolk: Boydell Press. ISBN 978-0851153575.
- Davis, R.H.C. A History of Medieval Europe: From Constantine to Saint Louis, Third Edition. New York: Taylor and Francis, 2006.
- Dunphy, Graeme, “Annales Fuldenses." From Encyclopedia of the Medieval Chronicle, Ed Graeme Dunphy, Cristian Bratu. https://dx.doi.org/10.1163/2213-2139_emc_SIM_00131. Accessed November 18, 2018.
