= Brederode =

Brederode may refer to:

- Dutch ship Brederode, flagship of the Dutch fleet in the First Anglo-Dutch War
- Castle Brederode, a ruined castle near Santpoort-Zuid, Netherlands
- Frans van Brederode (1465–1490), who conquered Rotterdam in 1488 during the Hook and Cod wars
- Henry, Count of Bréderode (1531–1568), who was an early leader of Les Gueux
- Gerbrand Adriaensz Bredero (1585–1618), Dutch poet whose name is sometimes misspelled Brederode
- Van Brederode, a Dutch noble family
