= Anne Joanne of Nassau-Siegen =

German countess (1594–1636)

- Lady of Brederode, Vianen, Ameide and Kloetinge
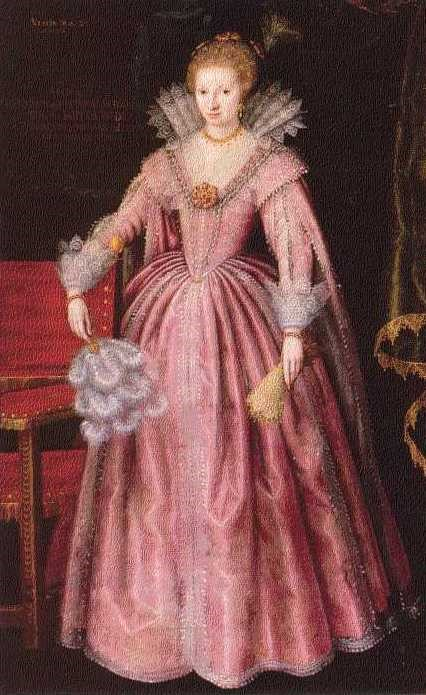
- Lady Anne Joanne of Brederode, nee Countess of Nassau-Siegen. Anonymous portrait, 1620. Braunfels Castle.

- Coat of arms
- Full name: Anne Joanne Countess of Nassau-Siegen
- Native name: Anna Johanna Gräfin von Nassau-Siegen
- Born: Anna Johanna Gräfin zu Nassau, Katzenelnbogen, Vianden und Diez, Frau zu Beilstein; 2 March 1594^{Jul.} Dillenburg Castle
- Baptised: 17 March 1594^{Jul.} Siegen
- Died: December 1636; The Hague
- Buried: Great Church, Vianen
- Noble family: House of Nassau-Siegen
- Spouse: Johan Wolfert van Brederode
- Issue Detail: Amalia Margaretha
- Father: John VII 'the Middle' of Nassau-Siegen
- Mother: Magdalene of Waldeck-Wildungen

Countess Anne Joanne (Note: Huberty, et al. (1981), p. 234 mentions the given name Anne only. Romein (1937), pp. 125–126, Van der Aa (1855), p. 1267 and Textor von Haiger (1617), p. 172 only the given name Anna.) of Nassau-Siegen (2 March 1594^{Jul.} – December 1636), German: Anna Johanna Gräfin von Nassau-Siegen, official titles: Gräfin zu Nassau, Katzenelnbogen, Vianden und Diez, Frau zu Beilstein, was a countess from the House of Nassau-Siegen, a cadet branch of the Ottonian Line of the House of Nassau, and through marriage Lady of Brederode, Vianen, Ameide and Kloetinge.

== Biography ==
Anne Joanne was born at Dillenburg Castle on 2 March 1594^{Jul.} (Note: "She was baptised in Siegen on Sunday 17-3-1594 (see State Archives Wiesbaden 170^{III}), letter from Count Wolfgang Ernst I of Ysenburg-Büdingen. Another notification preserved in the archives of the princes of Isenburg-Büdingen-Birstein at Büdingen Castle clearly shows that the date 23-2-1594, indicated by Dek (1962) and all printed genealogies, is incorrect. The letter, dated Dillenburg 3 March 1594, states that Anne was born "verschiedenen Tag ... und Sonntag Judicae den 17ten Marty ... getauft". The reference to Sunday 17 March clearly indicates that the writer of the letter used the old style and that, when he speaks of a birth that took place the day before, this can only be a birth that took place on 2 March, old style. The mistake may be due to the fact that in Holland (where the countess later lived) the new style was in use. Probably, it was believed that her date of birth was calculated according to the new calendar and German authors converted it to the old calendar, which is indeed the incorrect date of 23 February.") as the ninth child and fourth daughter of Count John VII 'the Middle' of Nassau-Siegen and his first wife, Countess Magdalene of Waldeck-Wildungen. Anne Joanne was baptised in Siegen on Sunday 17 March^{Jul.}. Since 29 July 1612 she stayed in the noble abbeys of Keppel and Herford. (Note: Textor von Haiger (1617), p. 172 refers to her as Geistliche Jungfrau.)

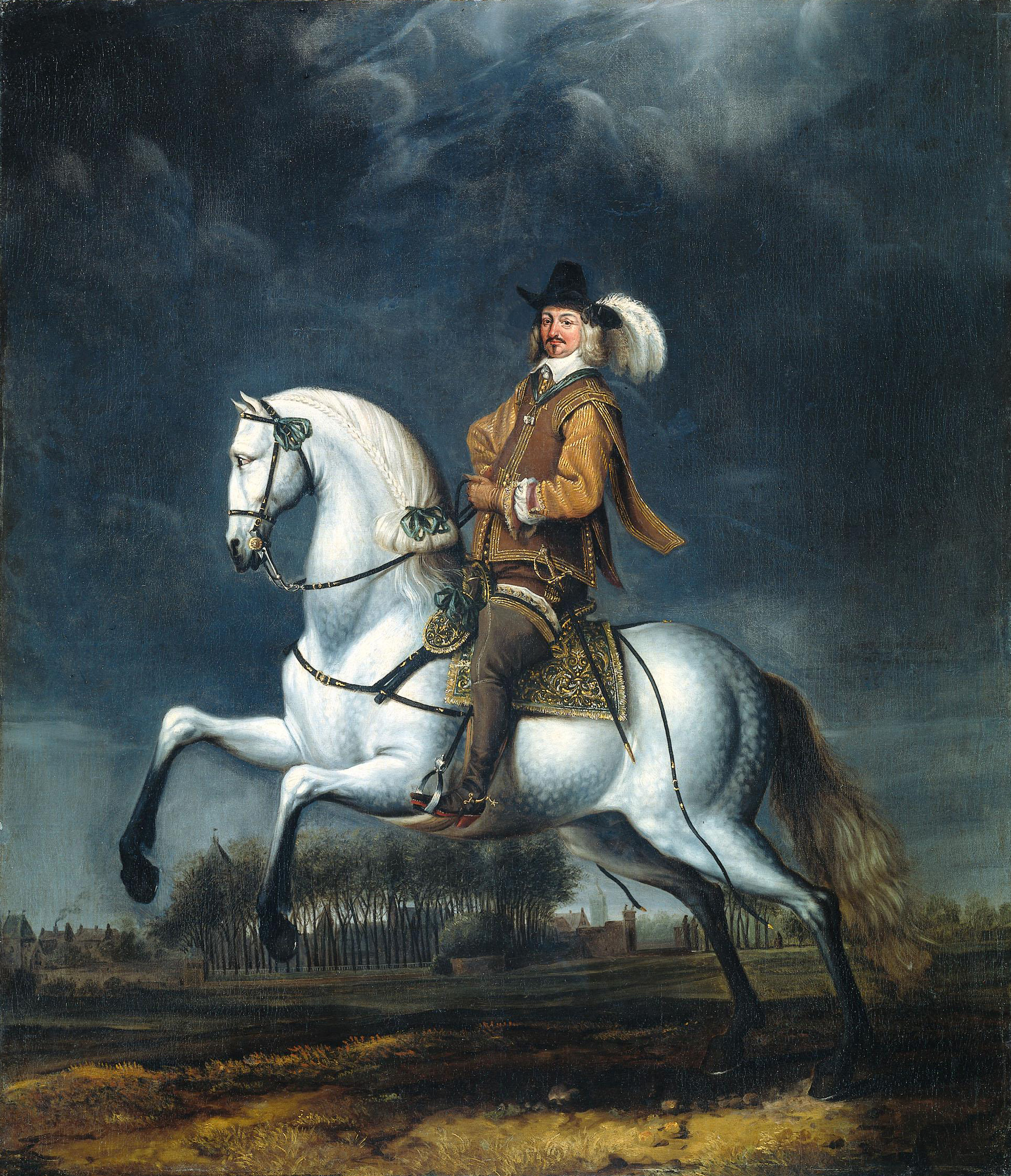
Johan Wolfert van Brederode. Equestrian portrait attributed to Jan van Rossum, 1640–1655. Rijksmuseum Amsterdam.

Anne Joanne married at Broich Castle near Mülheim an der Ruhr on 19 June 1619 (Note: "According to Dek (1970) and Europäische Stammtafeln, the marriage took place on 14-6, but in the State Archives Wiesbaden 170^{III} we find a letter from Jakob Schickhard, addressed to John 'the Middle', Count of Nassau-Siegen, which recounts in full detail the ceremony celebrated in Broich on 19-6 and then the couple's departure for Vianen. This letter is dated Siegen 30 June 1619. See also Royal House Archive of the Netherlands IV/1345. The contract was signed in Siegen on 18-3-1619 (Royal House Archive of the Netherlands 4/1346 I).") to Johan Wolfert van Brederode (Heusden (?), 12 June 1599 – Petersheim Castle near Maastricht, 3 September 1655), Lord of Brederode, Vianen, Ameide and Kloetinge. The castle where the marriage took place was the Residenz of Count John Adolf of Daun-Falkenstein-Broich, the husband of Anne Joanne's sister Anne Mary. Johan Wolfert brought all his goods in the marriage, while Anne Joanne brought 12,000 guilders, of which the interest was 600 guilders annually, and her own goods and jewellery. As a dower she was granted Haaften Manor and 4000 guilders annually. According to an eyewitness, the marriage contract and the testaments were signed on 19 June and "habe dauraufhin die Kopulation stattgefunden und die Hochzeit bis auf Mittwoch, den 23. Juni, gewährt" ("thereupon the copulation took place and the wedding was celebrated until Wednesday, 23 June"). After the festivities the young couple travelled by coach to Wesel, whereupon Prince Maurice of Orange's yacht took them to Vianen. Two of Anne Joanne's brothers were in the party: William and fourteen-year-old John Maurice. A painting by Cornelis Vroom in the town hall of Vianen shows the arrival of the couple on the River Lek.

On 16 March 1620 their first child was born, a daughter Sofia Theodora. The grandfather, Count John 'the Middle', congratulated the parents on the birth of their daughter in his letter from Rheinfels of 4 April 1620, but he himself would have preferred a son.

Great was the joy when the long-awaited son, Walraven, was born on 25 September 1628. Three days after the birth, Johan Wolfert sent the drost of Vianen to the States of Holland with the message that his wife had given birth to "een jonge Soon, weesende sijnen eersten Soon, die hy dagte op te trekken om het Land dienst te mogen doen" ("a young son, being his first son, whom he had planned to raise to the service of the country"). He asked the States to act as sponsors for the baptism. The States voted a generous baptismal gift of 1800 guilders. However, the boy died a few days later, on 1 October. The grief about this also reached the outside world. Joost van den Vondel, in his poem De Rijnstroom about the River Rhine, which he dedicated to Johan Wolfert, wrote a couple of verses about the longing for a son.

At the baptism of Countess Henriette Amalia of Nassau, the daughter of Prince Frederick Henry of Orange and Countess Amalia of Solms-Braunfels, on 23 November 1628, Anne Joanne was a baptismal witness.

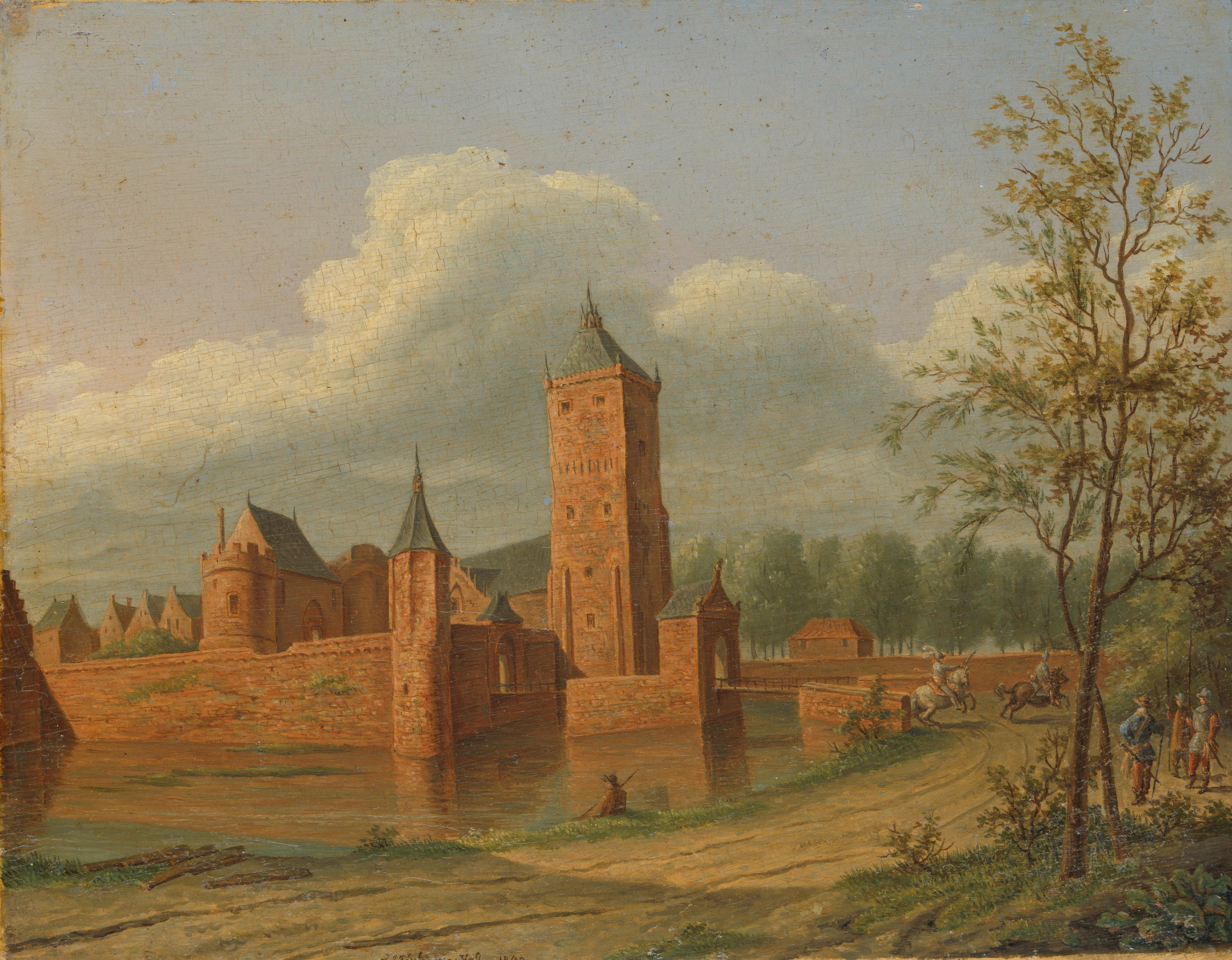
Batenstein Castle. Painting by Jan Jacob Teyler van Hall, 1840. Rijksmuseum Amsterdam.

The Brederodes usually resided at Batestein Castle in the northwest corner of the city of Vianen. The castle was beautifully furnished and the walls were papered with tapestries and gold wallpaper. The couple received many guests in Vianen, including Prince Frederick Henry and Countess Amalia of Solms-Braunfels, the counts of Nassau and Solms, the viscounts of Dohna and members of the States of Holland, who were received royally. Because Johan Wolfert frequently had to visit The Hague for his duties, he bought a representative building on 3 Lange Vijverberg from Countess Emilia of Nassau in 1626. After Johan Wolfert was appointed governor of the city of 's-Hertogenbosch and the Meierij on 27 January 1630, the family moved into the Jesuit college as their official residence. The city magistrate donated costly tapestries for the palace in 1631 and contributed to Anne Joanne's travel expenses, elegantly wrapped in a fine purse, when she visited the city.

The year 1630 was a difficult one for the couple. Anne Joanne gave birth to stillborn children in March and October. Furthermore, Theodora van Haaften, the mother of Johan Wolfert, died in August. In October 1631 Anne Joanne again gave birth to a stillborn child.

Anne Joanne died in The Hague in December 1636. (Note: "The place of death in Dek (1970), with the date 7-12-1636 (as in Europäische Stammtafeln). However, a serious reservation must be made with this information, since the bell in the Great Church or St. James' Church in The Hague was not rung for her until 23 December 1636. See the register of fees received for opening graves or ringing the bell (church registers inv. n2. 68, f. 16v.). This information was obtained from the Municipal Archives in The Hague, according to whom no actual death certificates existed at the time.") She was buried in the Great Church in Vianen.

Johan Wolfert remarried in The Hague on 11 February 1638 to Countess Louise Christine of Solms-Braunfels (Braunfels, 17 October 1606 – Vianen, 24 March 1669). Louise Christine was a younger sister of Amalia of Solms-Braunfels, wife of Prince Frederick Henry of Orange. Eight children were born from Johan Wolfert's second marriage. Johan Wolfert died on 3 September 1655 at Petersheim Castle near Maastricht, a property of his relative Ferdinand de Merode. He was interred in the family tomb in the Great Church in Vianen on 25 October.

== Portrait of Anne Joanne painted by Van Dyck? ==
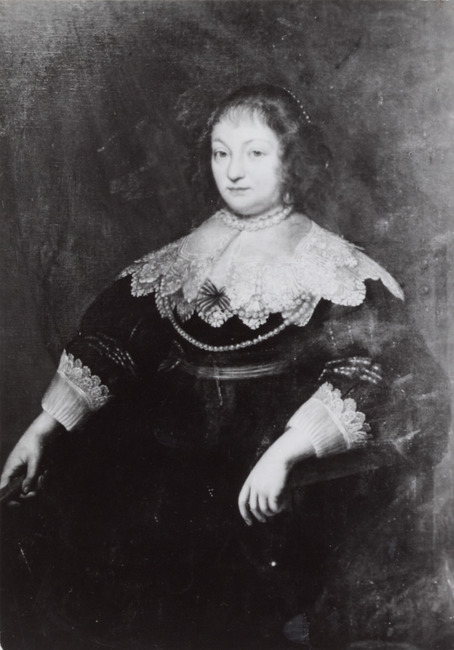
The portrait of Anne Joanne of Nassau-Siegen from the private collection of the Fürst zu Dohna in Schlobitten Castle that went up in flames at the end of the World War II.

One of the most intriguing questions in the iconography of the Brederodes is whether the court painter Anthony van Dyck contributed to it. Van Dyck visited The Hague in the early summer of 1631, where he painted the portraits of Prince Frederick Henry of Orange, his wife Amalia and their son William. He may also have painted Anne Joanne on the same occasion. Her portrait, which was kept at Schlobitten Castle until the Second World War and fell victim to the flames there, shows amazing similarities to the portrait that Van Dyck made of Amalia of Solms-Braunfels. Not only are the composition and the clothing identical, but both women have a distinguished regal appearance. Van Dyck was known for his ability to flatter his models without violating their likeness. Johan Wolfert honoured this portrait of his first wife. In 1646, ten years after her death, it was still hanging in his cantoir at Batestein Castle.

The knee-length portrait showed Anne Joanne sitting. She wore a dark dress with a raised waist and wide sleeves, a lace composite collar, a pearl necklace on a brocade bow for the chest, and a fan in her right hand. In the portrait, she has frizzy hair with thin fringes. The portrait hung at Schlobitten Castle in the Garden Hall in the 2nd row on the far right. It was destroyed in 1945.

== Issue ==
From the marriage of Anne Joanne and Johan Wolfert the following children were born:

1. Sofia Theodora (Note: Dek (1968), p. 277 calls her Sofia Dorothea.) (Vianen, 16 March 1620 – Halberstadt, 23 September 1678), married in 's-Hertogenbosch in April 1644 to Viscount Christian Albrecht of Dohna (Küstrin, 15 November 1621 – Gartz, 14 December 1677).
2. Juliana (c. 1622 – 10 July 1678).
3. Florentina (Vianen, 7 January 1624 – Frankfurt, 13 February 1698), married in 's-Hertogenbosch on 9 March 1645 to Count Maurice of Solms-Hungen (21 November 1622 – 30 November 1678).
4. Trajectina Anna (Note: Dek (1968), p. 277 calls her Anna Trajectina.) (13 April 1626 (Note: Dek (1968), p. 277 mentions born in or before 1629. Koenhein & Heniger (1999), p. 43 state that Dek (1959), p. 140 mentions completely wrong data about the birth, baptism and baptismal gift of Trajectina Anna, referring to the act of 29 November 1626 in which the States of Utrecht ratified the baptismal gift of an annuity of 300 guilders, when they stood as sponsors at the baptism. Strangely enough, Heniger (1999), p. 135 – in the same publication – mentions 1629 as the year of birth.) – 13 February 1672), married in 1670 to Count George Herman Reinhard of Wied-Runkel (9 July 1640 – 7 June 1690).
5. Walraven (Vianen, 25 September 1628 – 1 October 1628 (Note: Dek (1968), p. 277 mentions only that Walraven died young. Furthermore, he mentions a nameless son (Vianen, 15 September 1628 – 22 September 1628). These are the birth and death dates of Walraven calculated according to the Julian calendar. Therefore, it must be concluded that the author has confused both sons.)).
6. Amalia Margaretha (? – 14 August 1663 (1665?)), married:
  1. in 1645 to Albrecht Heinrich Slawata von Chlum und Koschumberg (? – 1661).
  2. on 28 December 1662 to Count Gottlieb Amadeus of Windischgrätz (Regensburg, 13 March 1630 – Vienna, 25 December 1695).
7. stillborn daughter ('s-Hertogenbosch, 30 October 1630).
8. stillborn daughter ('s-Hertogenbosch, October 1631).

From the marriage also two sons and two daughters were born, who died unbaptised.

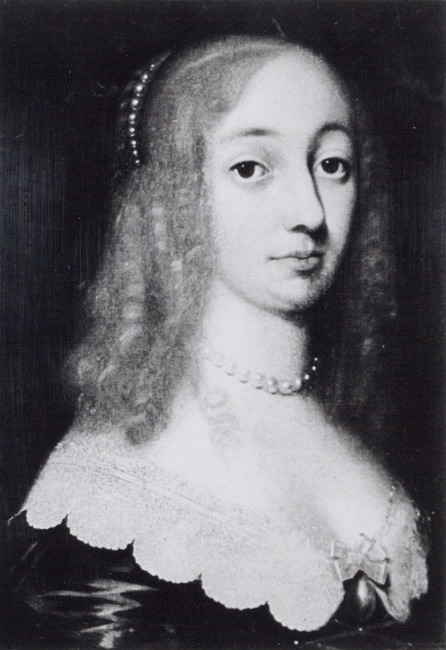
Sofia Theodora van Brederode. Portrait by Pieter Nason, 1644. Muzeum Warmii i Mazur, Olsztyn.

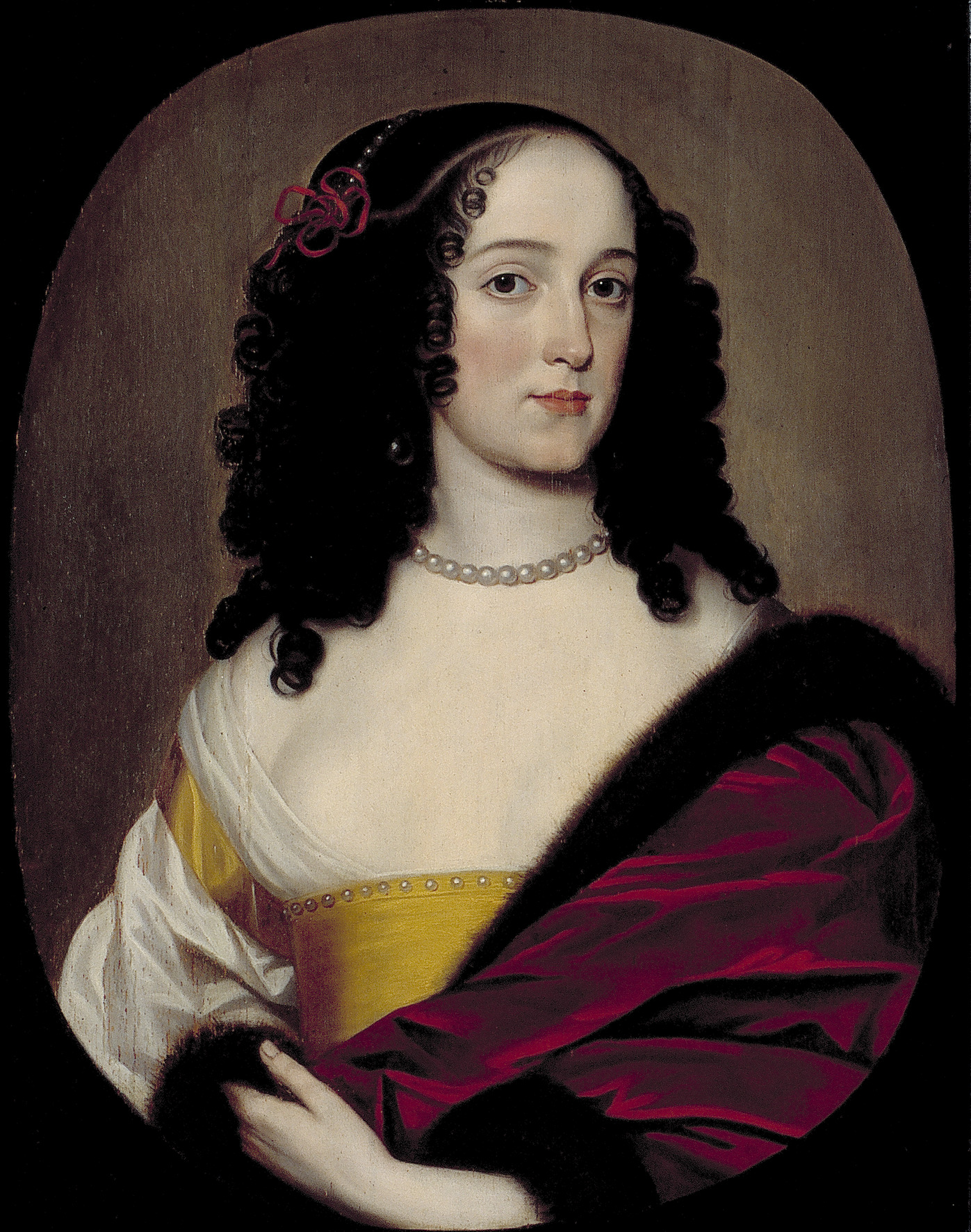
Trajectina Anna van Brederode. Portrait by Gerard van Honthorst, 1650–1656. Rijksdienst voor het Cultureel Erfgoed.

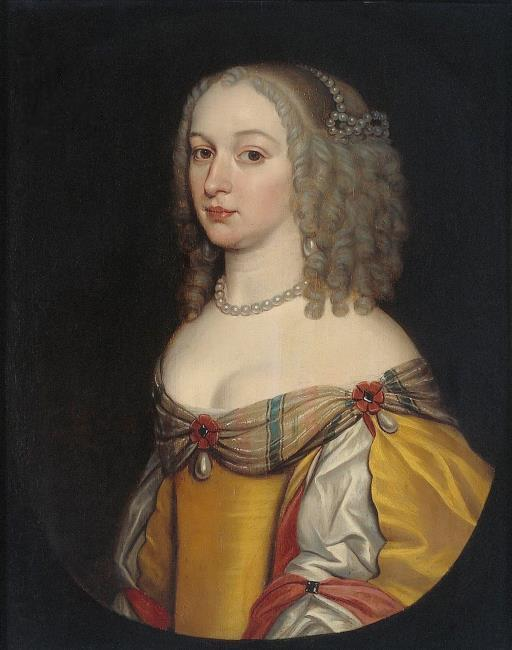
Amalia Margaretha van Brederode. Portrait by Gerard van Honthorst, 1640–1660. Rijksdienst voor het Cultureel Erfgoed.

== Ancestors ==
Ancestors of Anne Joanne of Nassau-Siegen
Great-great-grandparents	John V of Nassau-Siegen (1455–1516) ⚭ 1482; Elisabeth of Hesse-Marburg (1466–1523)	Bodo III 'the Blissful' of Stolberg-Wernigerode (1467–1538) ⚭ 1500; Anne of Eppstein-Königstein (1481–1538)	John IV of Leuchtenberg (1470–1531) ⚭ 1502; Margaret of Schwarzburg-Blankenburg (1482–1518)	Frederick V 'the Elder' of Brandenburg-Ansbach (1460–1536) ⚭ 1479; Sophia of Poland (1464–1512)	Philip I of Waldeck-Waldeck (1445–1475) ⚭ 1464; Joanne of Nassau-Siegen (1444–1468)	William of Runkel (?–1489) ⚭ 1454; Irmgard of Rollingen (?–1514)	Gerlach II of Isenburg-Grenzau (?–1500) ⚭ 1455; Hildegard of Sierck (?–1490)	Henry of Hunolstein-Neumagen (?–1486) ⚭ 1466; Elisabeth de Boulay (?–1507)
Great-grandparents	William I 'the Rich' of Nassau-Siegen (1487–1559) ⚭ 1531; Juliane of Stolberg-Wernigerode (1506–1580)		George III of Leuchtenberg (1502–1555) ⚭ 1528; Barbara of Brandenburg-Ansbach (1495–1552)		Henry VIII of Waldeck-Wildungen (1465–1513) ⚭ before 1492; Anastasia of Runkel (?–1502/03)		Salentin VII of Isenburg-Grenzau (before 1470–1534) ⚭ Elisabeth of Hunolstein-Neumagen (c. 1475–1536/38)	
Grandparents	John VI 'the Elder' of Nassau-Siegen (1536–1606) ⚭ 1559; Elisabeth of Leuchtenberg (1537–1579)				Philip IV of Waldeck-Wildungen (1493–1574) ⚭ 1554; Jutta of Isenburg-Grenzau (?–1564)			
Parents	John VII 'the Middle' of Nassau-Siegen (1561–1623) ⚭ 1581; Magdalene of Waldeck-Wildungen (1558–1599)							

== Sources ==
- Van der Aa, A.J. (1855). "Brederode (Joan Wolfert van)". Biographisch Woordenboek der Nederlanden, bevattende levensbeschrijvingen van zoodanige personen, die zich op eenigerlei wijze in ons vaderland hebben vermaard gemaakt (in Dutch). Vol. Tweede deel. Tweede stuk. Haarlem: J.J. van Brederode. pp. 1265–1268.
- Behr, Kamill (1854). Genealogie der in Europa regierenden Fürstenhäuser (in German). Leipzig: Verlag von Bernhard Tauchnitz.
- Dek, A.W.E. (1959). "Genealogie der heren van Brederode". Jaarboek Centraal Bureau voor Genealogie (in Dutch). Vol. XIII. 's‑Gravenhage: De Residentie.
- Dek, A.W.E. (1962). Graf Johann der Mittlere von Nassau-Siegen und seine 25 Kinder (in German). Rijswijk: Krips Repro.
- Dek, A.W.E. (1968). "De afstammelingen van Juliana van Stolberg tot aan het jaar van de Vrede van Münster". Spiegel der Historie. Maandblad voor de geschiedenis der Nederlanden (in Dutch). 1968 (7/8): 228–303.
- Dek, A.W.E. (1970). Genealogie van het Vorstenhuis Nassau (in Dutch). Zaltbommel: Europese Bibliotheek.
- von Ehrenkrook, Hans Friedrich; Förster, Karl & Marchtaler, Kurt Erhard (1928). Ahnenreihen aus allen deutschen Gauen. Beilage zum Archiv für Sippenforschung und allen verwandten Gebieten (in German). Görlitz: Verlag für Sippenforschung und Wappenkunde C.A. Starke.
- Heniger, J. (1999). "Genealogische tabellen". In Koenhein, A.J.M.; Brederoo, P.; Will, Chr.; Heniger, J.; Leeuwenberg, H.L.Ph. & Den Hertog, P.T. (eds.). Johan Wolfert van Brederode 1599-1655. Een Hollands edelman tussen Nassau en Oranje (in Dutch). Vianen/Zutphen: Historische Vereniging Het Land van Brederode/Uitgeversmaatschappij Walburg Pers. pp. 133–135. ISBN 90-5730-034-6.
- Hoffmeister, Jacob Christoph Carl (1883). Historisch-genealogisches Handbuch über alle Grafen und Fürsten von Waldeck und Pyrmont seit 1228 (in German). Cassel: Verlag Gustav Klaunig.
- Huberty, Michel; Giraud, Alain & Magdelaine, F. & B. (1981). l'Allemagne Dynastique (in French). Vol. Tome III: Brunswick-Nassau-Schwarzbourg. Le Perreux: Alain Giraud.
- Huberty, Michel; Giraud, Alain & Magdelaine, F. & B. (1987). l'Allemagne Dynastique (in French). Vol. Tome V: Hohenzollern-Waldeck-Familles alliées A-B. Le Perreux-sur-Marne: Alain Giraud.
- Joachim, Ernst (1881). "Johann der Mittlere von Nassau-Siegen". Allgemeine Deutsche Biographie (in German). Vol. Band 14. Leipzig: Duncker & Humblot. pp. 265–266.
- Koenhein, A.J.M. & Heniger, J. (1999). "Johan Wolfert van Brederode 1599–1655 – 'In Opbloey neergetoghen'". In Koenhein, A.J.M.; Brederoo, P.; Will, Chr.; Heniger, J.; Leeuwenberg, H.L.Ph. & Den Hertog, P.T. (eds.). Johan Wolfert van Brederode 1599-1655. Een Hollands edelman tussen Nassau en Oranje (in Dutch). Vianen/Zutphen: Historische Vereniging Het Land van Brederode/Uitgeversmaatschappij Walburg Pers. pp. 9–46. ISBN 90-5730-034-6.
- Lück, Alfred (1981) [1967]. Siegerland und Nederland (in German) (2nd ed.). Siegen: Siegerländer Heimatverein e.V.
- Menk, Friedhelm (1971). Quellen zur Geschichte des Siegerlandes im niederländischen königlichen Hausarchiv (in German). Siegen: Stadt Siegen/Forschungsstelle Siegerland.
- Romein, J.M. (1937). "Brederode, Joan Wolfert van". In Molhuysen, P.C. & Kossmann, F.K.H. (eds.). Nieuw Nederlandsch Biografisch Woordenboek (in Dutch). Vol. Tiende deel. Leiden: A.W. Sijthoff. pp. 125–126.
- Schutte, O. (1979). "Genealogische gegevens". In Tamse, C.A. (ed.). Nassau en Oranje in de Nederlandse geschiedenis (in Dutch). Alphen aan den Rijn: A.W. Sijthoff. pp. 40–44, 224–228. ISBN 90-218-2447-7.
- Spliethoff, M.E. (1999). "Familiereünie in Vianen. Portretten van Johan Wolfert van Brederode en zijn gezin herenigd". In Koenhein, A.J.M.; Brederoo, P.; Will, Chr.; Heniger, J.; Leeuwenberg, H.L.Ph. & Den Hertog, P.T. (eds.). Johan Wolfert van Brederode 1599-1655. Een Hollands edelman tussen Nassau en Oranje (in Dutch). Vianen/Zutphen: Historische Vereniging Het Land van Brederode/Uitgeversmaatschappij Walburg Pers. pp. 75–84. ISBN 90-5730-034-6.
- Textor von Haiger, Johann (1617). Nassauische Chronik (in German). Herborn: Christoph Raab.
- Vorsterman van Oyen, A.A. (1882). Het vorstenhuis Oranje-Nassau. Van de vroegste tijden tot heden (in Dutch). Leiden/Utrecht: A.W. Sijthoff/J.L. Beijers.
- De Winkel, M. (1999). "De kleding van de Nederlandse adel in de 17de eeuw en de portretten van de Brederodes". In Koenhein, A.J.M.; Brederoo, P.; Will, Chr.; Heniger, J.; Leeuwenberg, H.L.Ph. & Den Hertog, P.T. (eds.). Johan Wolfert van Brederode 1599-1655. Een Hollands edelman tussen Nassau en Oranje (in Dutch). Vianen/Zutphen: Historische Vereniging Het Land van Brederode/Uitgeversmaatschappij Walburg Pers. pp. 85–97. ISBN 90-5730-034-6.

Anne Joanne of Nassau-Siegen House of Nassau-Siegen Born: 2 March 1594^{Jul.} Died: December 1636
Regnal titles
Preceded by Margaret Mary of Daun	Lady of Brederode, Vianen, Ameide and Kloetinge; 29 January 1620 – December 1636	Vacant Title next held by Louise Christine of Solms-Braunfels
