= Batestein Castle =

Former castle in Vianen, the Netherlands

Coordinates: 51°59′43.7″N 5°5′19.6″E

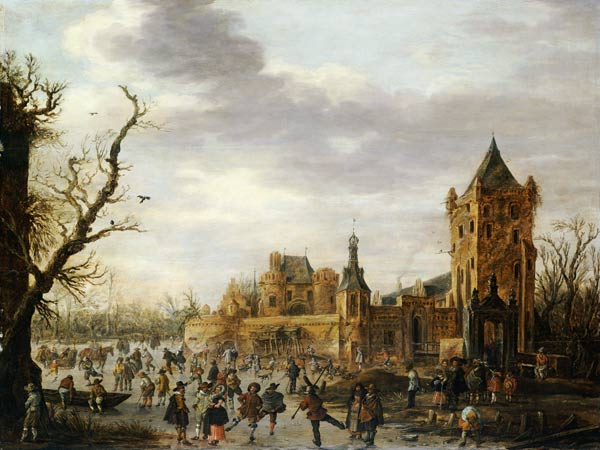
Batestein castle by Jan van Goyen around 1630

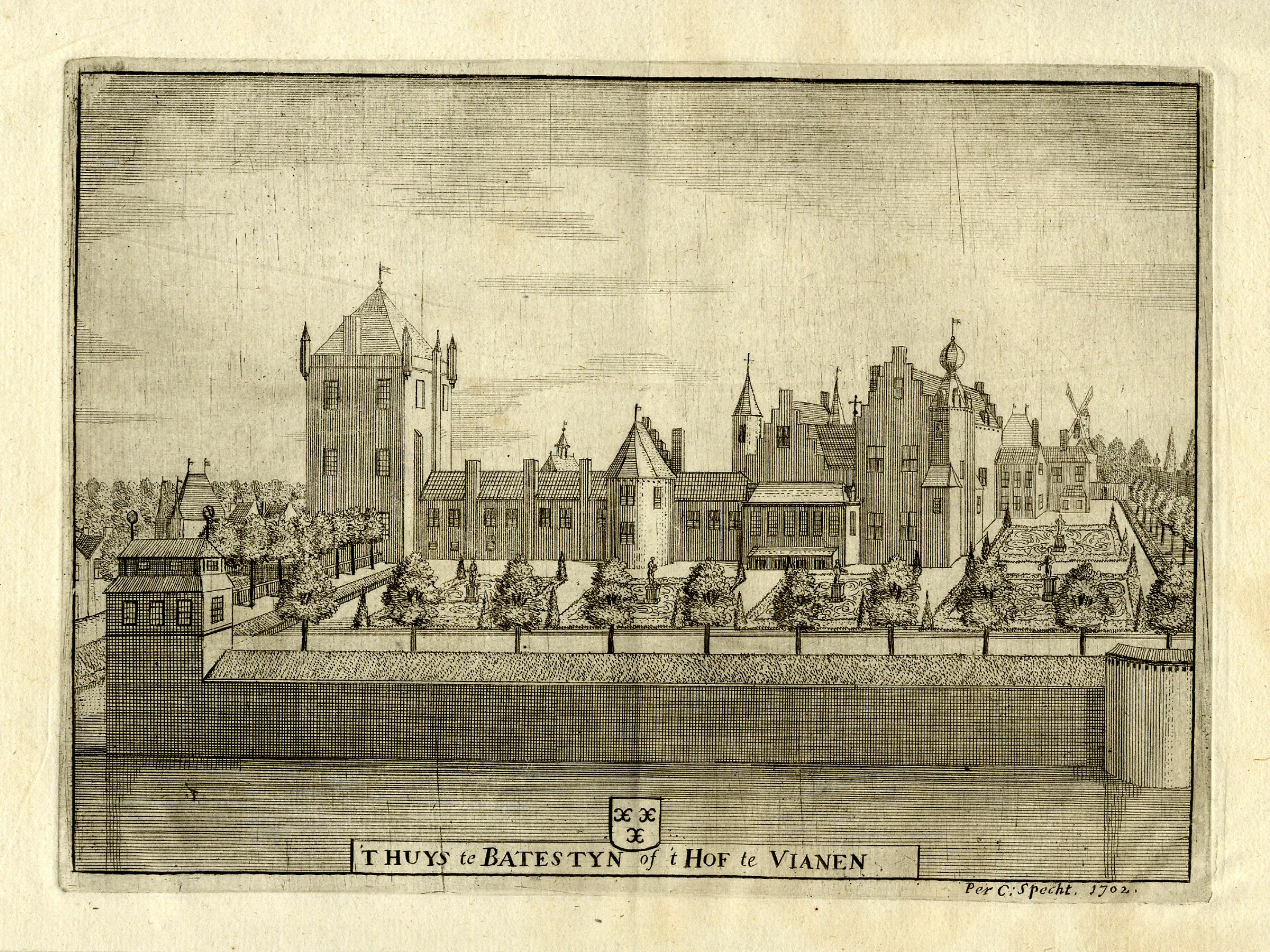
Batestein castle with the Saint Pol tower on the left

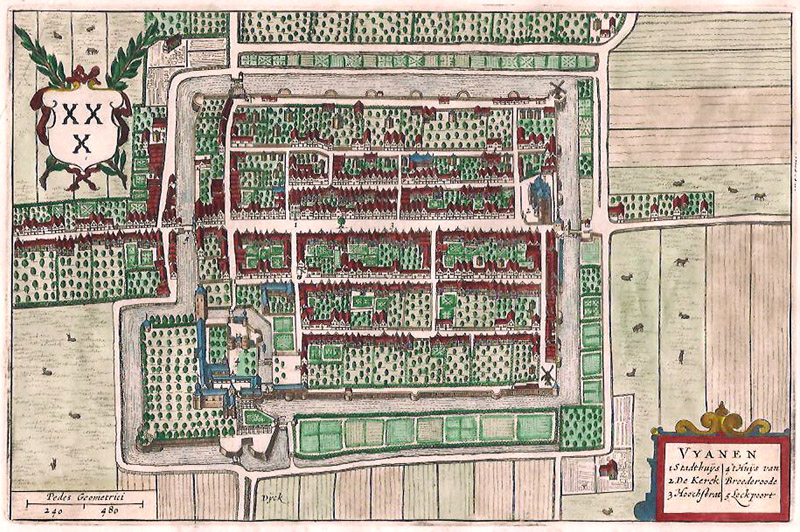
Map of Vianen by Joan Blaeu from 1649. Batestein castle is on the left below

Batestein castle by Roelant Roghman

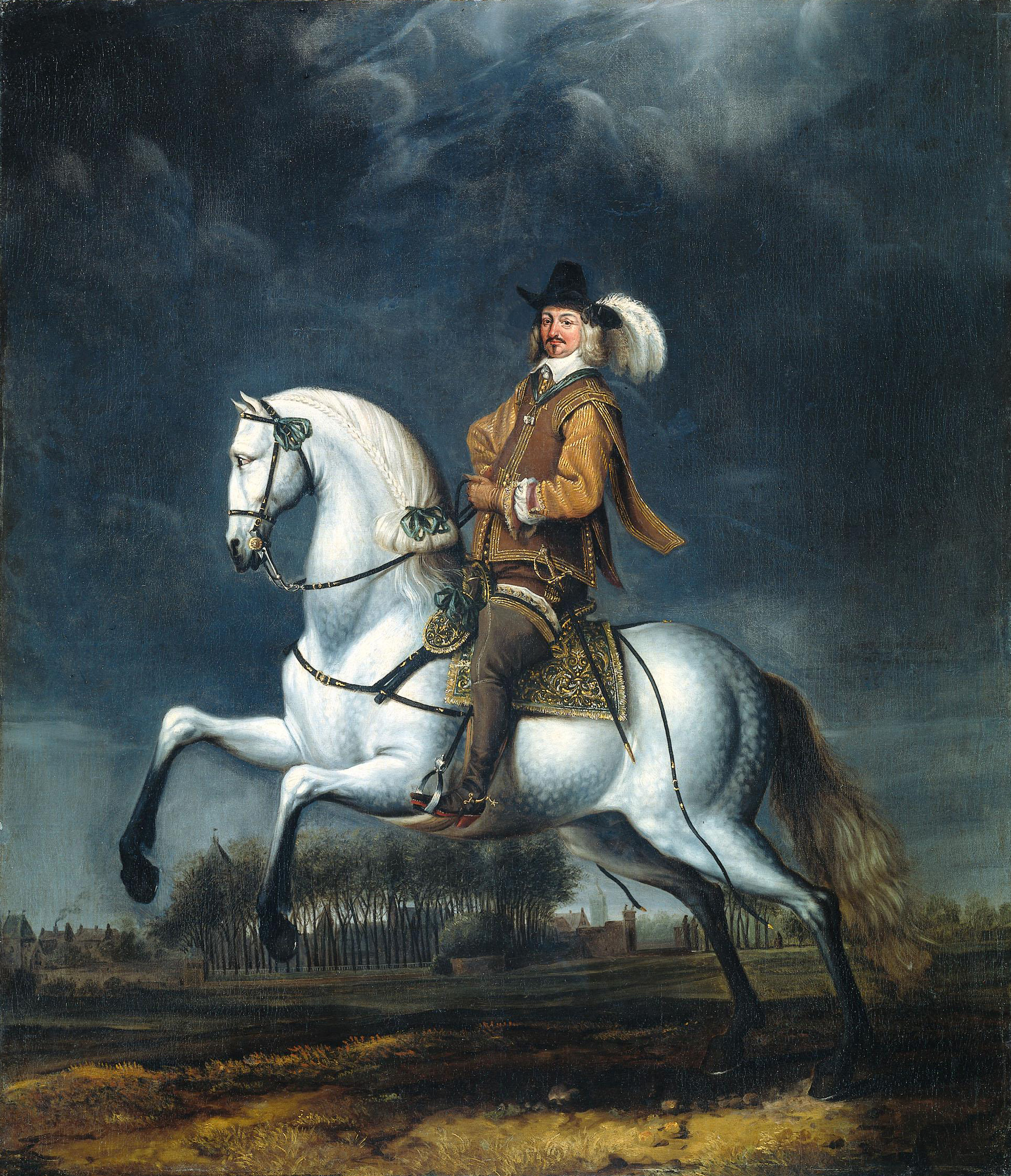
Johan Wolfert van Brederode with Batestein castle in the back

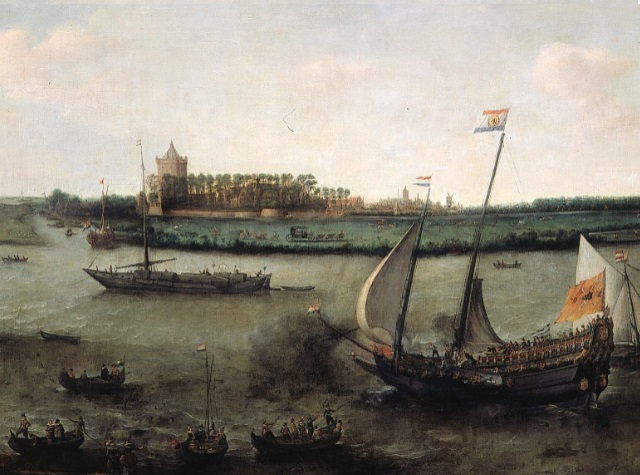
Arrival of Johan Wolfert van Brederode at Vianen and Batestein castle

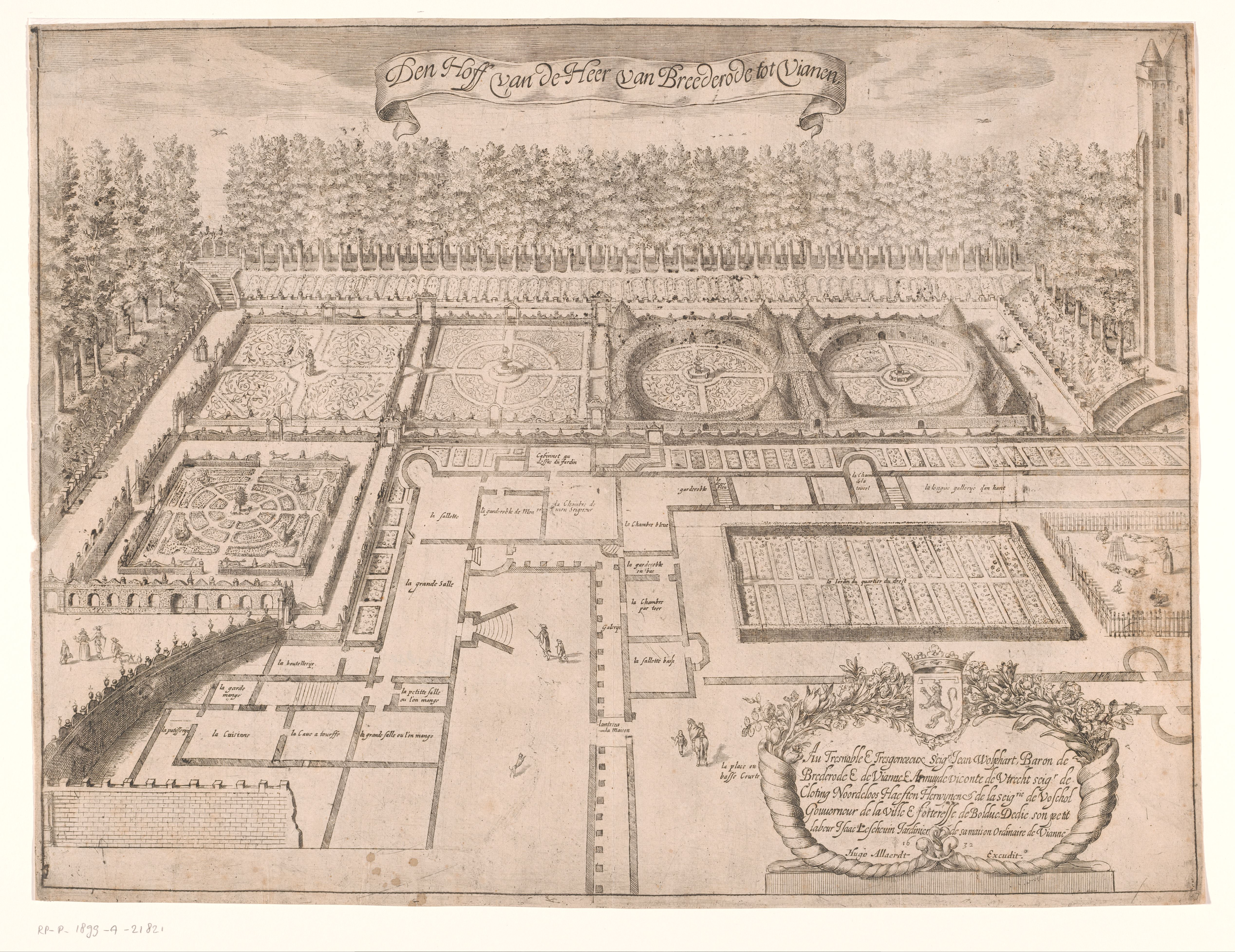
Plan of Batestein castle

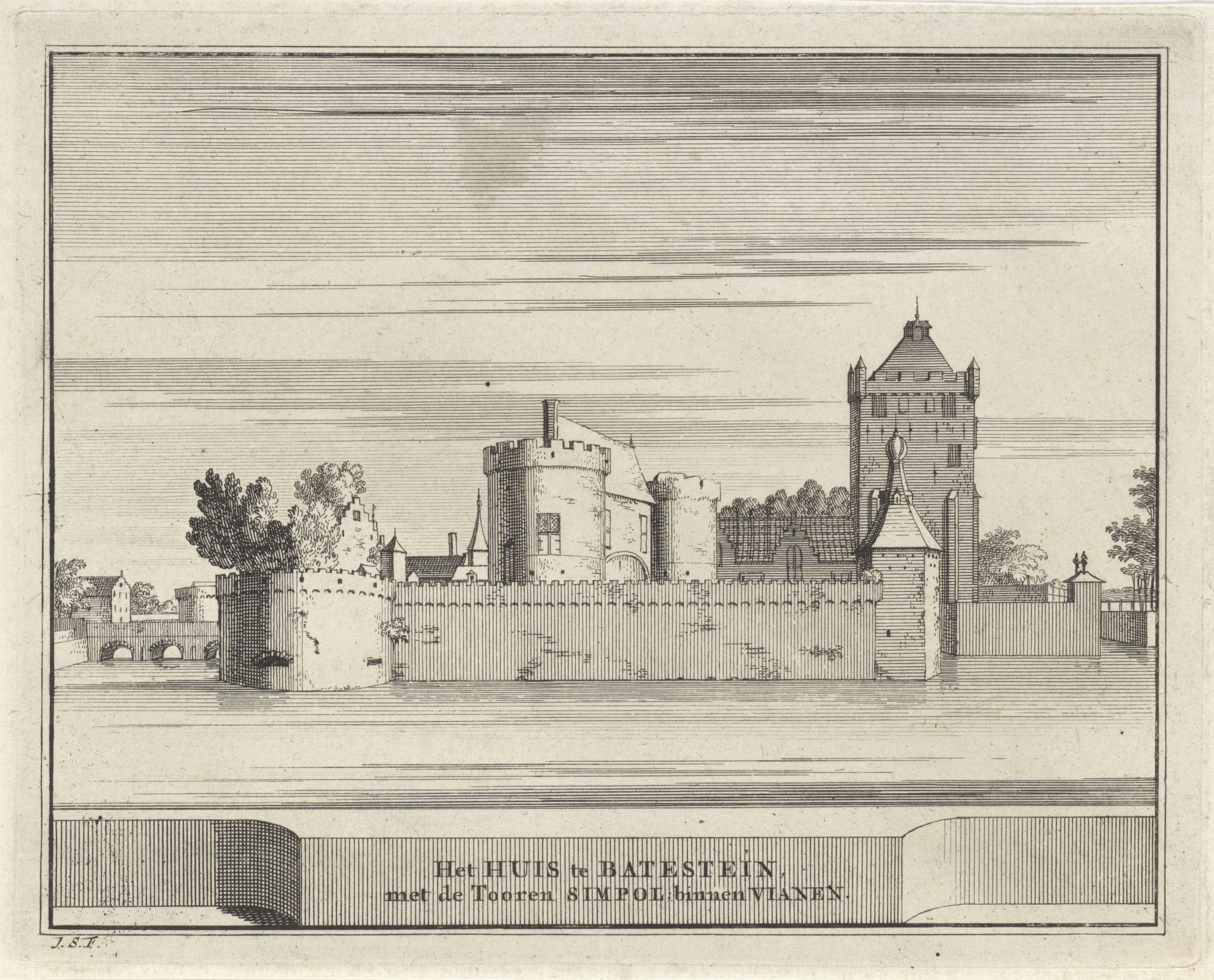
Batestein castle

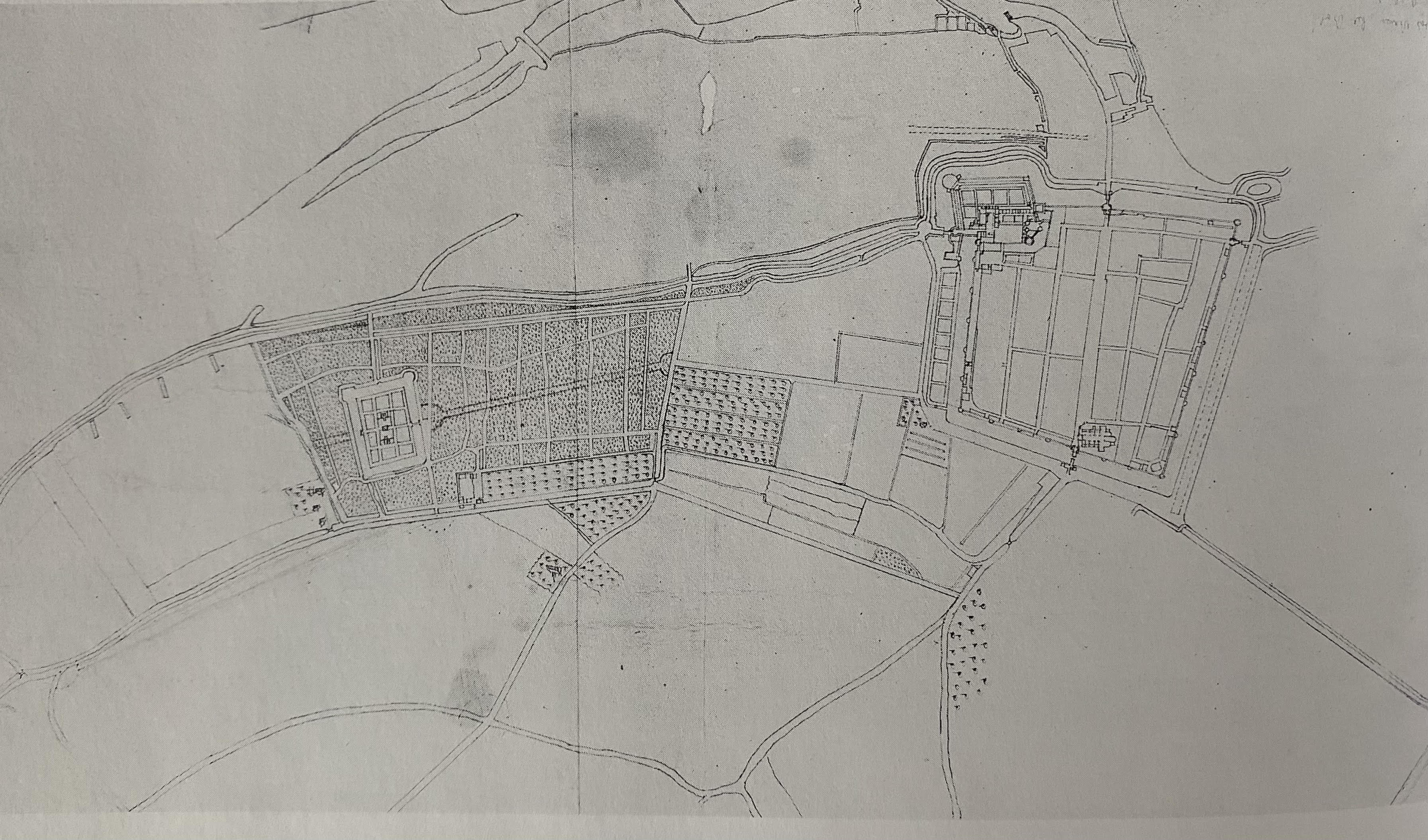
18th century map of Vianen, Batestein castle Amaliastein

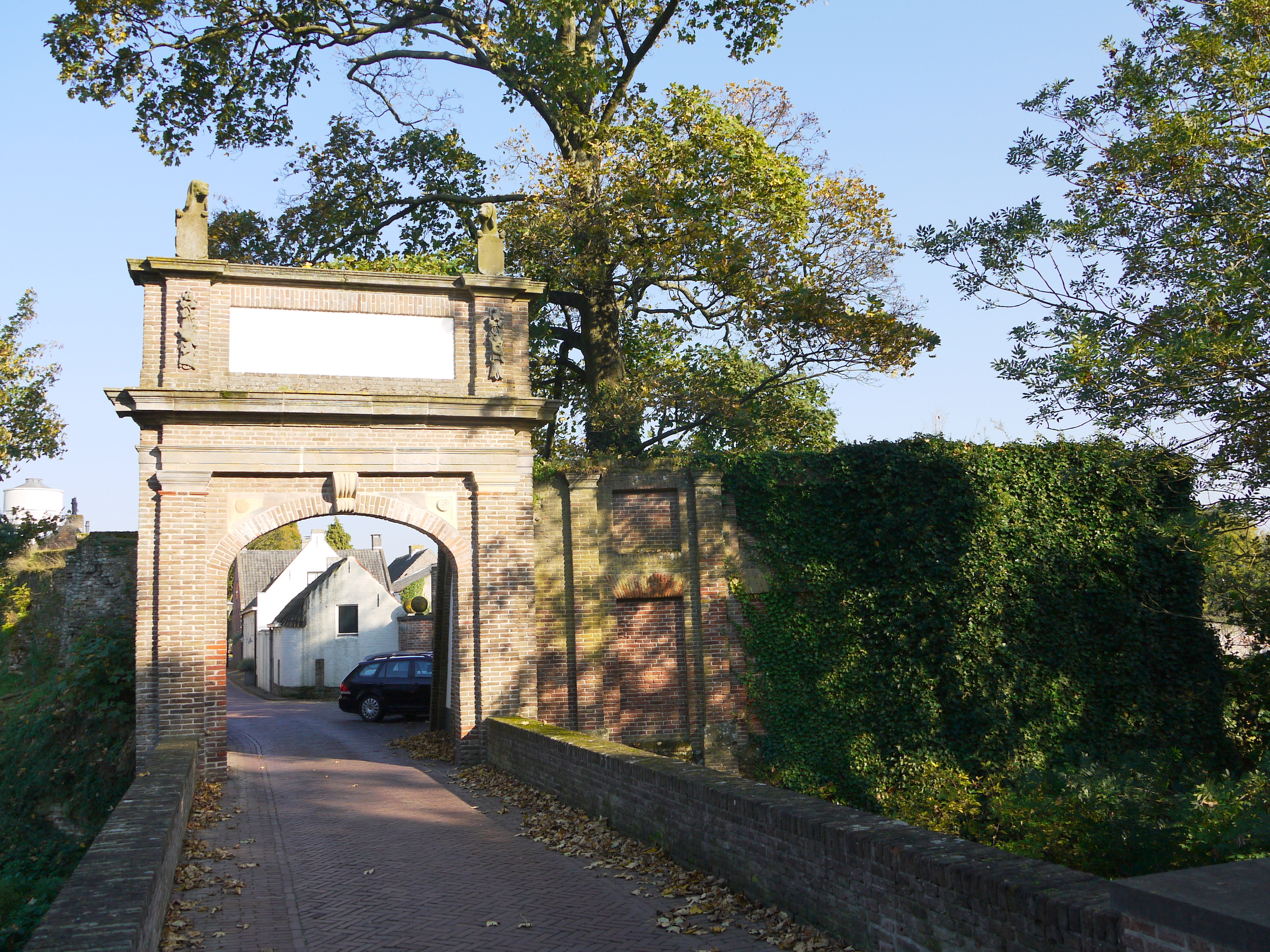
The Hofpoort gate is the remaining part of Batestein

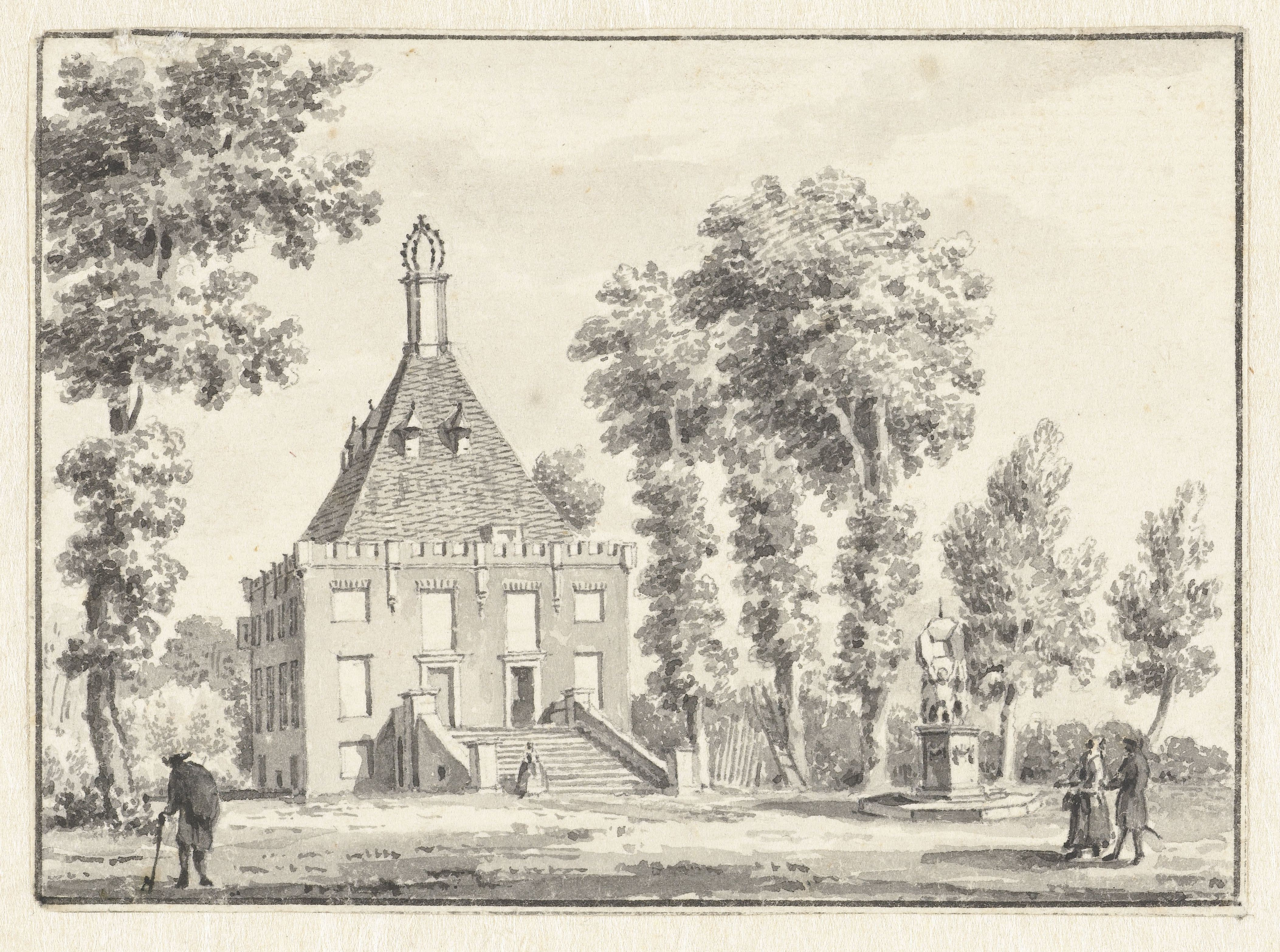
Amaliastein

Batestein Castle (Dutch: Kasteel Batestein) was a princely residence in Vianen in the Dutch province of Utrecht (since 2002), and South Holland (before 2002). It was the main seat of the Van Brederode family. The castle was famous for its gardens and its sculptures. It has been demolished in the 19th century. Today, not much remains except a gate from the 17th century, a pump and some parts of the walls. A local foundation is working on a partial reconstruction of the gardens.

== History ==
=== ‘Kasteel op de Bol’ ===
The first lords of Vianen came from the family of Beusichem. They were officials of the bishop of Utrecht. They lived in the castle on the Bol (Dutch: Kasteel op de Bol), located 350 meters south of the old town of Vianen. It consisted of an irregular octagon of about thirty meters in diameter. It was surrounded by a moat and had a tower on the southwest corner.

Today, there is nothing left to see of the castle on the Bol. However, excavations were carried out between 1969 and 1971, during which remains were uncovered.

=== Gijsbrecht van Vianen ===
Gijsbrecht van Vianen left the castle on the Bol. Around 1370, he commissioned the construction of castle Batestein on the northwest tip of Vianen. Gijsbrecht was married to Beatrix van Egmond, also known as Beate or Bate. Possibly, the name Batestein is derived from her name.

The castle was dominated by a large keep, also called the tower of Saint Pol. Gijsbrecht had captured the count of Saint Pol during the Battle of Baesweiler in 1371 and imprisoned him in the castle. The ransom Gijsbrecht received from the count financed the construction of the tower, and as thanks, it was named after the count.

=== Entrance of the Brederodes ===
In 1414, the castle came into the possession of Walraven I van Brederode (1370–1417) through marriage to Gijsbrecht's granddaughter, Johanna van Vianen. The Van Brederode family were among the most important nobles in the Netherlands. They held high military and political positions, serving as advisors and commanders, and holding titles such as the viscountship of Utrecht and count of Brederode. The ancestral seat of the family was Castle Brederode near Haarlem.

Under Hendrick van Brederode (1531–1568), the castle experienced its greatest splendour. The castle grew into an extensive complex, with several wings surrounding the castle tower. A beautiful renaissance garden was also laid out.

Batestein gained significant political importance when the Geuzen gathered here to prepare and draft the Compromise of Nobles in 1566, which Hendrik offered to Margaret of Parma (1522–1586), the Governor of the Netherlands. In 1567, Vianen fell into Spanish hands; the city was dismantled, and the goods of Van Brederode were confiscated. After the Eighty Years' War, the castle returned to the hands of the Van Brederodes, who had fought on the side of the States.

=== 17th Century ===
Johan Wolfert van Brederode (1599–1655) revived the castle. He was a field marshal in the State army and had good relations with the court of the princes of Orange. In 1619, he married Anne Joanne of Nassau-Siegen (1594–1636). Around 1630 to 1650, he had the castle embellished into a modern residence. The castle was beautifully furnished and the walls were papered with tapestries and gold wallpaper. The couple received many guests in Vianen, including prince Frederick Henry and his wife countess Amalia of Solms-Braunfels, the counts of Nassau and Solms, the viscount Dohna and members of the States of Holland, who were received royally.

During this construction period, the Hofpoort (Court Gate) was also built. The gate formed a decorative part of the castle connecting it to the gardens, which were expanded and designed at the same time under the supervision of gardener Isaac Leveschin. The gardens of Prince Maurice and Prince Frederick Henry in and around The Hague, near the Buitenhof and Honselaarsdijk, served as an example for the gardens.

With Wolfert van Brederode (1649–1679), the Brederode lineage died out. Initially, the property went to the von Dohna family, but in 1687, it was inherited by Simon Henry, Count of Lippe (1649–1697), who was married to Amalia of Dohna-Vianen.

On the night of September 11 to 12, 1696, a clerk set off fireworks in the courtyard of the castle. One or more rockets flew through an open window. In a short time, the castle was engulfed in flames. Only the most important documents could be saved; much of the castle was destroyed. Although there was a desire to rebuild the castle, this did not happen due to lack of funds. The heavy financial burdens persisted, and in 1725, Simon Henry Adolph, Count of Lippe-Detmold (1694–1734) sold Batestein Castle and the lordship of Vianen to the States of Holland and West Friesland. The count had the furnishings sent to his castle in Detmold, including around sixty paintings.

=== 18th century till Today ===
During the 18th century, the castle served various purposes, including as a barracks and military hospital. The Saint-Pol tower was demolished in 1771. The 19th century brought its end. The demolition of what remained of the castle began shortly after 1828. Today, only a few remnants remain, such as the Hofpoort from around 1650 and a pump from 1648 on the Hofplein.

The rich interior and furnishings, including tapestries and paintings (an inventory from 1685 listed 250 paintings), have been dispersed and lost over time. The princes of Dohna had collected their heirlooms in a Brederode room, which existed in Schlobitten Palace until its destruction in 1945. Furthermore, some paintings from Batestein can still be found in Braunfels Castle, home of the Solms-Braunfels family.

A local foundation called Hof van Brederode Vianen is working to restore a portion of the castle gardens. The municipality made the land available for this purpose in 2019. The foundation aims to make an accurate reconstruction based on historical imagery and archaeological and cadastral sources.

=== Amaliastein ===
Around 1560, Hendrick van Brederode had a country estate built for his wife Amalia of Neuenahr (1539–1602), west of Vianen: Amaliastein. In the 17th century, significant gardens were established here under Johan Wolfert van Brederode. The estate was demolished around 1830. What remains today are a sundial, part of the forest, and the moated grounds. Additionally, there are maps and drawings from the 17th and 18th centuries.

== Literature ==
- de Meyere, J.A.L.; Ruijter, J.M.M. (1981). Kasteel Batestein te Vianen Aspecten uit de historie van het kasteel en zijn bewoners (in Dutch). Vianen: Stichting Stedelijk Museum Vianen. p. 73.
- Schulte, A.G., ed. (1997). Ruïnes in Nederland (in Dutch). Zwolle: Waanders Uitgevers. p. 333. ISBN 90-400-9974-X.
- Koenhein, Adrienne J.M., ed. (1999). Johan Wolfert van Brederode, 1599-1655 een Hollands edelman tussen Nassau en Oranje (in Dutch). Zutphen: Walburg Pers. p. 144. ISBN 978-9057300738.
- Stöver, Jos, ed. (2000). Kastelen en Buitenplaatsen in Zuid-Holland (in Dutch). Zutphen: Walburg Pers. p. 511. ISBN 90-5730-078-8.
