= Dirk III van Brederode =

- Lord of Brederode
- Brederode coat of arms
- Successor: Reinoud I van Brederode
- Born: c. 1308
- Died: 11 November 1377

Dirk III van Brederode (ca. 1308 – Haarlem, 11 November 1377) was lord of Brederode.

== Life ==
=== Family ===
Dirk III's grandfather Dirk II van Brederode (1256-1318) had two sons: Willem and Hendrik. Willem was the oldest, and married Elisabeth (a.k.a. Elsbee) of Kleve, but when he predeceased his father in 1316, his son Dirk III was only about 8 years old. That year Dirk's grandfather tried to get his hands on Elisabeth's dower, but the Count of Holland prevented this. The dower included: the House and judiciary at Voshol and 500 pounds a year, mostly on goods in the vicinity.

In 1318 Willem's younger brother Hendrik became Hendrik I of Brederode because Dirk was still a minor. Willem's rich widow Elisabeth would leave to remarry somewhere near Kleve. Dirk III was left behind, and came under guardianship of William III of Holland (1286-1337). This might have been forced by Dirk II and or the count in order to keep control of the succession of Elisabeth's and possibly Hendrik's succession. As a consequence of the guardianship, Dirk III grew up with the future William IV of Holland. It also meant that Dirk spent a lot of time in Mons in the County of Hainaut, the usual residence of the counts of Hainaut and Holland.

=== Early career ===
In 1333 Count William III promised Dirk that if Dirk's uncle Lord Hendrik Lord of Brederode would die without legal offspring, Dirk III would inherit Brederode and all it entailed. Exceptions were the possible dower of Hendrik's wife Isabel, and the lordships of Aelbrechtsberg and Tetterode, and the many lands in South Holland, which the count would then keep to himself. This was a favor by the count, because fiefs could either be inherited by other relatives than sons, or could not. In the latter case everything reverted to the count as liege lord if there was no son. In such case it was usual for liege lord to allow succession by other relatives for a price, but for Hendrik's succession, his younger brother also named Dirk (c. 1307-1346, married to Maria van Buren Huis Brederode) was a closer relative.

The promise of the Brederode succession probably helped Dirk to get the hand of Beatrix van Heinsberg and Valkenburg in about 1334. Meanwhile the value of this prospective inheritance was not that high anymore, because by 1337 it had been pawned to John I of Polanen.

Meanwhile Dirk continued his career in the vicinity of the (future) Willem IV of Holland. In 1336-1337 he joined him on a Lithuanian Crusade, which he repeated in 1344-1345. In April 1340 Dirk III got the promise that his eldest son would replace him as heir if he died before Hendrik died. In September 1340 'Knight' Dirk III bought the Lordship of Naaldwijk from the count for the duration of his (Dirk's) life. In 1342 he got rabbit hunting rights warande on the Brederode grounds from the count.

=== Lord of Brederode ===
The exact date of Hendrik of Brederode's death, and of Dirk III becoming Lord of Brederode is unknown. A September 1344 charter has both Hendrik and Dirk III as signatories. 'Heeren Henrik, Heere van Bredenroede' appears in third position, right after Willem van Duvenvoorde, and before Jan van Polanen Lord of De Lek. 'Heere Diderick van Breederoeden' is seventh. In June 1345 Dirk is still mentioned simply as Dirk van Brederode, not as 'lord of', like other lords were. This pattern then continued. In March 1351 Dirk III was even referred to as 'Lord of Voshol' (part of the dower of his mother).

Van Wijn claimed that at least by 27 September 1350 Hendrik was death and Dirk had become Lord of Brederode. To prove it, he used a letter of that date, by which William of Bavaria, announced that he laid down his authority in Holland. This letter as printed by Van Mieris indeed referred to: praesentibus Dominis, Abbate de Middelburgh, Havertsche, de Oosterhout, de Yselstein, de Lecke, & de Brederode, & Scabinis & Consulibus villae Dordracensis. Enough for Van Wijn to conclude that Dirk III had become Lord of Brederode, because Hendrik would not have signed after 'De Lek' but before him. However, in the later scientific edition, the text is: Presentibus dominis abbate de Middelburch, de Haveretsch, de Oesterhout, de Yselstein, de Lecka, Th. de Brederode et scabinis et consulibus ville Dordracensis. In other words: the letter proves the exact opposite of what Van Wijn thought, i.e. Dirk III was still not Lord of Brederode on 27 September 1350! (Th. is short for Theodoric, the Latin version of Dirk's name.) This also explains the March 1351 reference to Dirk III as Lord of Voshol.

Many authors have that Hendrik of Brederode was killed in the September 1345 Battle of Warns. This is convenient, because it explains his absence from 1345 to 1351, but the long list of those killed at Staveren does not mention him.

=== The Hook and Cod Wars ===
In 1350/51, during the Hook and Cod wars, Dirk was a leader of the Hook faction, which supported Margaret of Bavaria against her son William of Bavaria.

On 4 July 1351 'Dyrc van Bredenroede' was captured during the battle of Zwartewaal (also called the battle on the Meuse). At that time Brederode Castle was still defended by its castellan.

A treaty dated 23 October 1351 handles the surrender of Brederode Castle to Count William. In it, the count treated with 'the lord of Brederode' and his castellan Harman van den Busche. Brederode Castle would be surrendered. Harman and the garrison were allowed to leave with half their possessions. The lord of Brederode made his peace with the count. His goods were sequestered till further notice and managed by a land agent appointed by the count, who would pay Brederode's debts from it. Dirk would get an allowance of 350 pounds a year, payable on these goods. From a 27 September 1350 letter Van Wijn deduced that Dirk III was 'Lord of Brederode' by this time, but as shown above, this is highly unlikely.

Dirk was the prisoner of Gerard III van Heemskerk at Heemskerk Castle, then known as Marquette Castle, in July 1354. However, when the fight between Count William and Margaret was ended with a treaty, Dirk got his possessions back. On 8 December 1354 Count William ordered that Dirk was to get back all the goods he had owned before the war started.

== Offspring ==
Dirk III married around 1334 with Beatrix van Heinsberg and Valkenburg, a daughter of Reinoud I van Valkenburg. They had at least four children together:

- Reinoud I, 6th lord of Brederode, (1336–1390).
- Walraven van Brederode, (1338/1340 – 17 August 1369)
- Dirk van Brederode, knight, (1340/1342 – 1387)
- William van Brederode, owner of the lordship of Waalwyck (1346–1390)

== Notes ==
Preceded by Hendrik I van Brederode	Lord of Brederode; 1318–1377	Succeeded by Reinoud I van Brederode
