= William I van Brederode =

Lord of Brederode

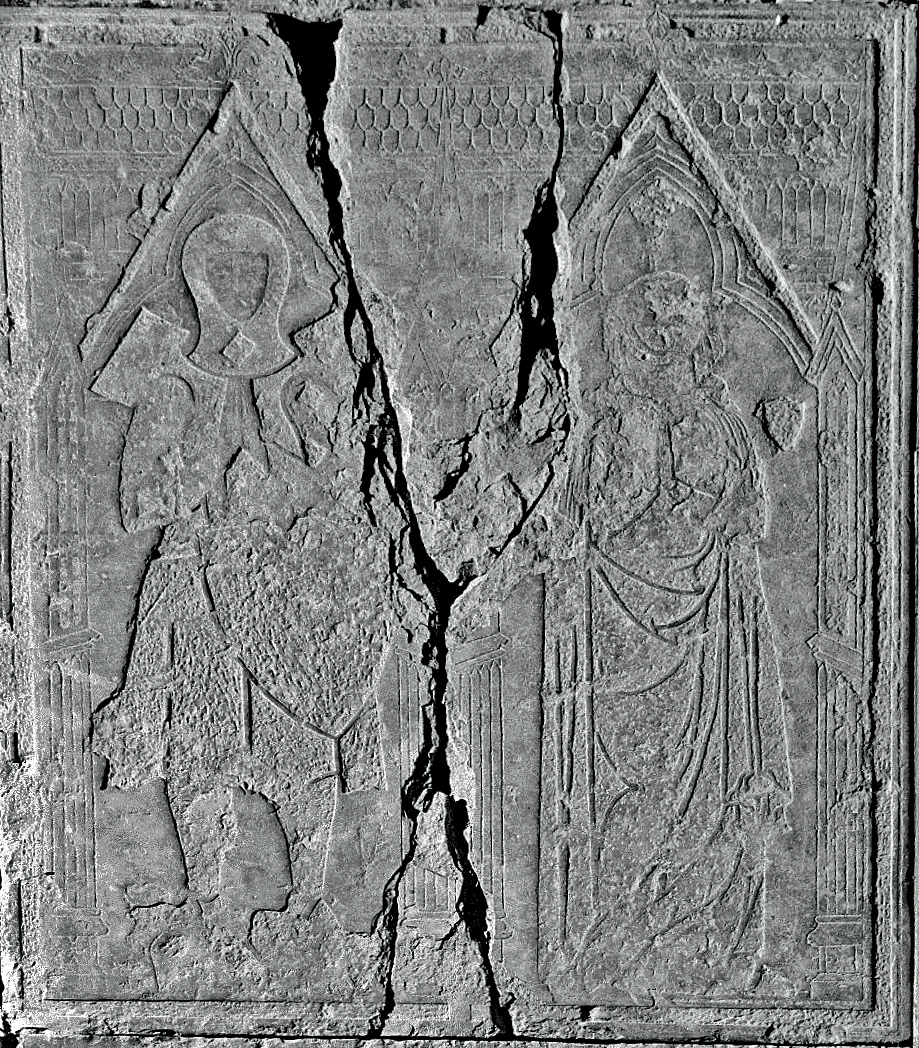

Willem van Brederode (1226/1230 in Santpoort – 3 June 1285 in Velsen) was Lord of Brederode.

== Life ==
He was the son of Dirk I van Brederode and Alvaradis van Heusden. William was only recognised as lord of Brederode in 1244, partially because he was a minor before that. Van Brederode accompanied William II, Count of Holland in his campaign against rebels above the Rhine in the Ruhr in 1248/49, and again in a campaign against the West Frisians in 1256. He was knighted in 1255, and appointed bailiff of Kennemerland in 1269. On 25 June 1282 he was awarded the rights to Goudriaan, Hardinxveld, Papendrecht, Peursum and Slingeland. William died in 1285 and was buried in the Brederode-chapel of the Engelmundus-church in Velsen.

== Family and Children ==
In 1254 William married Hildegonde van Voorne, and they had six children:

- Dirk II van Brederode, 1256–1318, William's successor
- Alverade van Brederode, 1258 – after 1323
- Rikairde van Brederode, ca. 1263 – after 1303
- Floris I (Florentius) van Schoten (Adrichem), ca. 1265 – 1327
- Aleid van Brederode, 1260–1333
- Theodoricus de Scouten, before 1297 – unknown
- William Ver Margrietsone van Brederode, unknown – after 1317
- Theodorius van Schoten, 1270 – unknown

Preceded by Dirk I van Brederode	Lord of Brederode; 1236/1244–1285	Succeeded by Dirk II van Brederode
