= Hendrick van Brederode =

16th-century Dutch noble; figure in the Eighty Years' War

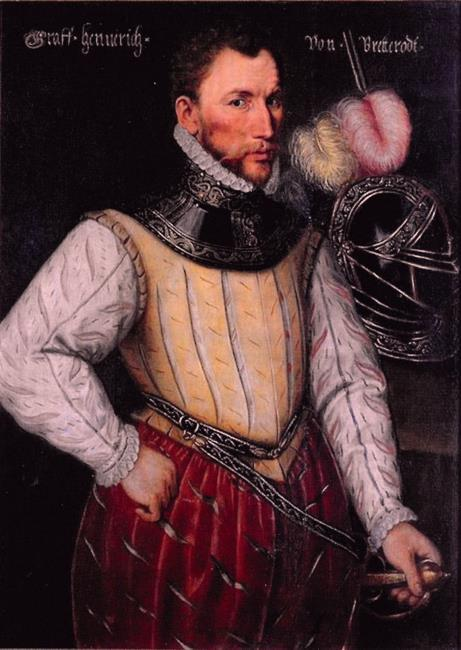
Hendrick van Brederode

Henry (Hendrik), Lord of Bréderode (December 1531 – 15 February 1568), also styled Count of Brederode, was a member of the Dutch noble family Van Brederode. He was the leader of the allied Dutch nobles, the so-called Compromise of Nobles of 1566 and the Geuzen at the beginning of the Eighty Years' War. Van Brederode was named the "Grote Geus" or the "Big Beggar".

== Biography ==
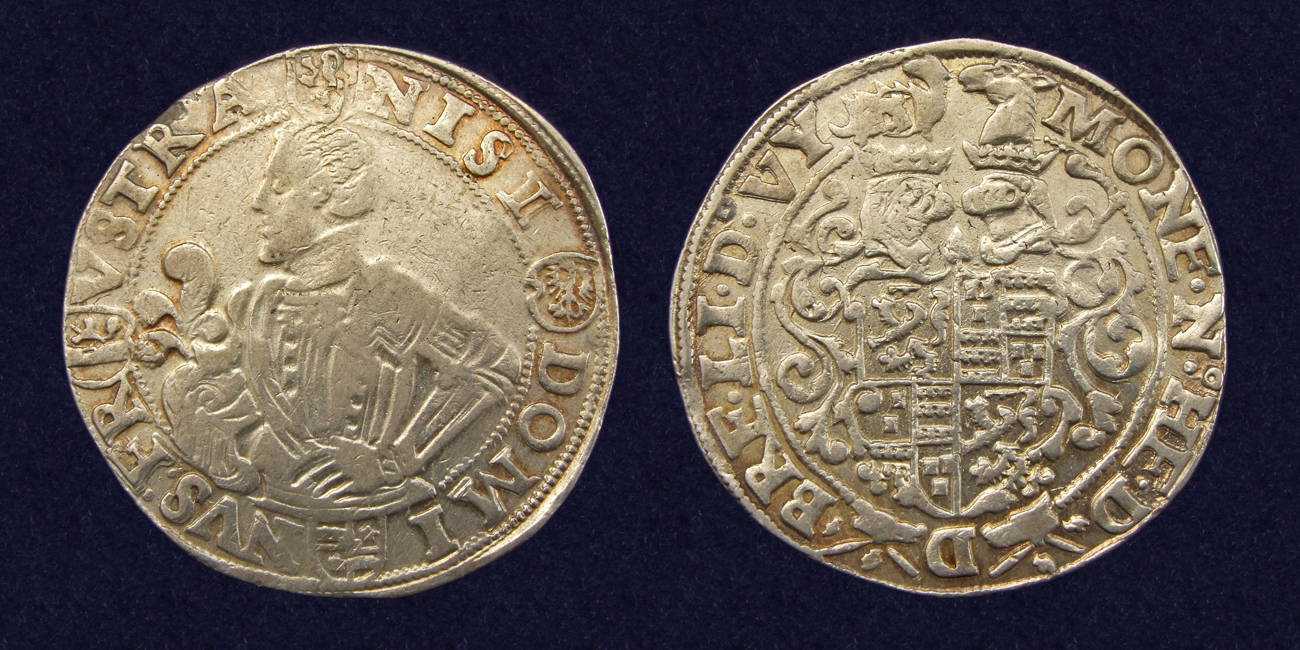
Sovereignty Vianen, AR Thaler, struck under Hendrik van Brederode

Brederode coat of arms

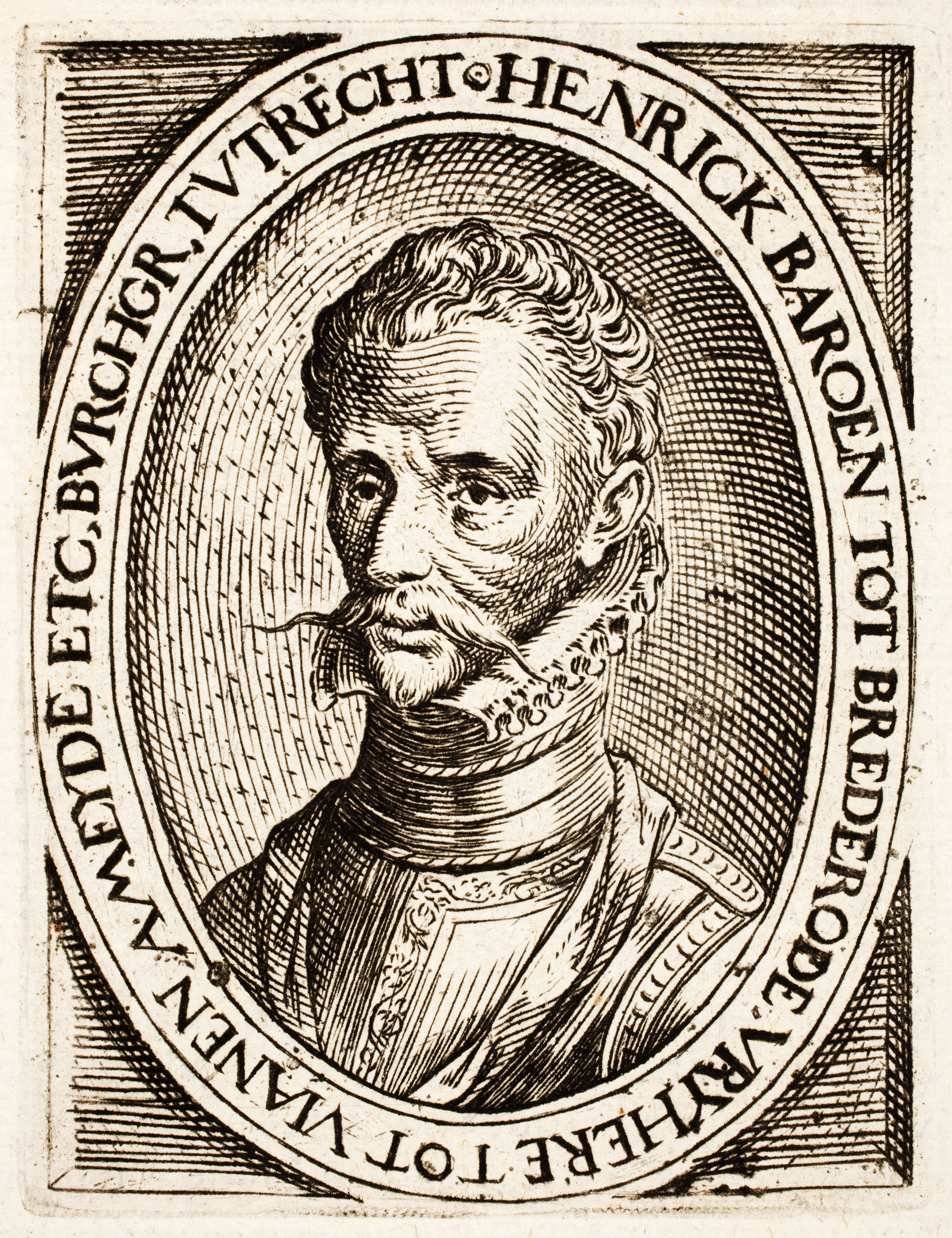
Engraving of Hendrick van Brederode

Hendrik van Brederode was born at Brussels as son of Reinoud III van Brederode and Philippote von der Marck. He became a convert to the Reformed faith and placed himself at the side of the Prince of Orange and Count of Egmont in resisting the introduction of the Spanish Inquisition and Spanish despotism into the Netherlands. In 1566, he was one of the founders of the confederacy of nobles who bound themselves to maintain the rights and liberties of the country by signing a document known as the Compromise of Nobles.

On 5 April that year, Brederode accompanied to the palace a body of 300 knights, for whom he acted as the spokesman, to present to the regent, Margaret of Parma, a petition setting forth their grievances. It was at a banquet at the Hotel Culemburg on 8 April, presided over by Bréderode, that the sobriquet of les Gueux, or "the Beggars," was first given to the opponents of Spanish rule. Bréderode, the "Grote Geus" or Big Beggar, was banished from the Netherlands by Alva, and died in exile shortly afterwards at the early age of thirty-six.

In March of the year 1567, backed by his friend Lenaert Jansz de Graeff, his brother Dirck Jansz Graeff and a large part of the bourgeoisie, Brederode became the Generalcaptain of the city of Amsterdam. But in the next month, Brederode and Lenaert Jansz de Graeff departed and the Spanish General Philippe de Noircarmes became the military commander of Amsterdam.

Hendrik was the descendant of an ancient family active in the affairs of war and peace, which had for some centuries been settled at Castle Brederode in Holland north-west of the village of Santpoort and after 1418 at Batestein Castle in Vianen. In 1557, he married Amalia of Neuenahr, daughter of Gumprecht of Neuenahr.

== In popular culture ==
Hendrick van Brederode is the main character in the 1949 novel De grote geus (The Great Geuz) written by Johan Fabricius.

The life and work of Brederode and also his friend Lenaert Jansz de Graeff served Jaap van de Wal as template and content of the historical novel De Grote Geus.

== See also ==
- Castle Brederode
- Batestein Castle
- Battle of Oosterweel

== Notes and references ==
Preceded by Reinoud III van Brederode	Lord of Brederode; 1556–1568	Succeeded by Reinoud IV van Brederode
