= Dirk I van Brederode =

Dirk van Teylingen, lord of Brederode (Latin: Theodericus de Theylingen) (c. 1180 – 1236) was lord of Brederode and landdrost of the counts of Holland.

== Life ==
He was the son of William van Teylingen. Two mothers are linked to him; Mary of Castricum and Agnes of Bentheim. Dirk is seen by some historians as the founder of the House of Brederode; the territory of Brederode, however, had already been in the possession of his father, who came from the Van Teylingen family, making it possible to consider William to be the first lord of Brederode.

In 1226 Dirk was appointed drost at the court of the count of Holland. He served under Floris IV of Holland and William I of Holland. During the absence of the count, he was the highest official in the county.

Brederode coat of arms

== Family and children ==
Dirk married Aleid Averadis van Heusden around 1215; they had at least six children:

- William, 2nd lord of Brederode (1226–1285), Dirk's successor
- Dirk of Brederode (1228–1279), knighted around 1255
- Floris of Brederode (1230 – after 1306), lord of Doortoge
- Aleidis of Brederode (1232 – c. 1262)
- Catharina of Brederode (born 1234, date of death unknown)
- Agnies of Brederode (c. 1245 – c. 1280)

After Dirk's death, his wife Aleid van Heusden married Herbaren II van der Lede

Preceded by New Creation	Lord of Brederode ?–1236	Succeeded by William I van Brederode
