= Amalia of Neuenahr =

Electress Palatine (1539–1602)

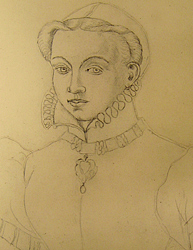
Countess Amalia of Neuenahr-Alpen, painted before 1602

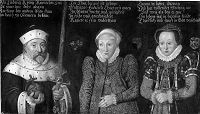
Amalia (right) with her first husband and his first wife

Countess Amalia of Neuenahr-Alpen (6 April 1539 – 10 April 1602) was Electress of the Palatinate of Rhine.

== Early life and ancestry ==
Amalia was born into an old German nobility, as the eldest child and only daughter of Count Gumprecht IV of Neuenahr-Lumburg-Moers (1502–1556) by his second wife, Countess Cordula of Holstein-Schauenburg (1516–1546).

== Biography ==
Her first husband was Hendrik van Brederode, member of the House of Brederode, who played an important part in the events leading up to the Eighty Years' War. After he became one of the leaders in the resistance against the Spanish Inquisition and Spanish rule in the Netherlands, she helped him collect funds.

After his death in 1568, she married Frederick III, Elector Palatine of the Rhine in 1569. It was in the same year that Emilia, the second daughter of William the Silent and his second wife Anna of Saxony was named after her. This is because she was in charge of Anna's household at the time. Frederick died in 1576.

From 1579 until 1587 she was in charge of Vianen, which she inherited from her first husband. In 1589 she inherited Limburg from Count Adolf of Neuenahr, Count of Limburg and Moers, her half-brother. In 1590 she was given the rights of use of Alpen, Helpenstein, Lennep and Erbvogtei of Köln by her younger half-sister, Countess Magdalena of Bentheim (1551-1626). Alpen was occupied by the Dutch Republic in 1597 and the following year by Spanish forces.

Royal titles
Preceded by Marie of Brandenburg-Kulmbach	Electress Palatine; 1569–1576	Succeeded by Elisabeth of Hesse
