= Dirk II van Brederode =

Dirk van Brederode (c. 1256, Santpoort – 16 December 1318, Rheims), was the Lord of Brederode.

The son and heir of William I van Brederode, he was nicknamed 'the Good'. Dirk van Brederode became lord of Brederode in 1285, bailiff of Kennemerland in 1288, and was knighted in 1290. He married around 1290 with Mary van der Lecke, daughter of Hendrik II, lord of the Leck and Jutte van Borsele.

Brederode coat of arms

He took part in, amongst others, the campaign against Friesland in 1288 under the command of Floris V of Holland, with a fleet of ships. In the same year he led an army sent by Floris V to Utrecht to arrest the lords of Amstel and Woerden. He died on his journey back from Palestina. He was buried in the Dominican convent in Reims.

== Children ==
Dirk II had at least three children with Mary van der Lecke (c. 1272–1307):

- Catharina van Brederode (c. 1285–1372), married John I, Lord of Polanen
- William van Brederode (c. 1287–1316), William died two years before his father, causing his son Dirk III van Brederode to succeed him as lord of Brederode.
- Jutta van Brederode (c. 1298–1346)

Preceded by William I van Brederode	Lord of Brederode ?–1318	Succeeded by Dirk III van Brederode
