= Van Brederode =

Dutch noble family

Brederode Coat of Arms
- Current region: Netherlands
- Origin: Santpoort

The Lords of Brederode (Heeren van Brederode) were a noble family from Holland who played an important role during the Middle Ages and the Early modern period. The family had a high noble rank and hold the titles Count of Brederode, Count of Gennep, and furthermore they ruled the souverain Lordship of Vianen, the Viscountship of Utrecht among other feudal titles.

== History ==
The Lords of Brederode descend from the Counts of Holland and the powerful Van Teylingen family (see Slot Teylingen, about halfway between Haarlem and Leiden). Dirk I van Brederode, also called Dirk van Teylingen, built the Brederode castle. The earliest documented members appear in the 13th century in the region of Santpoort, at Castle Brederode.

The lords of Brederode already had enormous influence in the 13th century. Their partisanship with John of Avesnes, Count of Holland was not without importance, but it increased when the dispute between the Hoeks and the Cods broke out in 1350. The Brederode were the hereditary leaders of the Hoeks, the noble party, and the Van Arkels and Egmonds, the rival dynasties, their opponents.

Walraven I van Brederode (1370–1417) acquired the title of Count of Gennep and the sovereign rule of Vianen. His son Reinoud II van Brederode (1415–1473) became hereditary burgrave of the city of Utrecht. The Brederodes, high-spirited due to their constantly growing possessions, their high reputation and their almost princely dignity, were always characterized by their pride. Reinouds II grandson Reinoud III van Brederode claimed the county of Holland under Charles V and was thus deprived of his dignity and property as a high traitor. But since his claims never had any real weight, he got them back from the emperor. Reinouds III second son was Hendrick, count of Brederode (1531–1568), the leader of the allied Dutch nobles, the so-called Compromise of Nobles of 1566 and the Geuzen. During the Protestant Reformation the Van Brederode family left Holland and their properties were confiscated by the government. Their descendants sued the government, but when the decision came in their favor the main family line had died out in 1679 with Wolfert van Brederode (1649–1679), son of Johan Wolfert van Brederode (1599–1655), Field Marshal of the Republic of the United Netherlands. The debt to the unknown heirs is still on the Netherlands State Budget ("Nederlandse staatsbegroting"). Currently the Dutch monarch is entitled to the interest of the capital (Queen Wilhelmina was the first to be entitled to this money). In 1967 the sum was said to be around 3.000 million Dutch guilders.

=== Other Brederodes ===
The Van der Duyn family, later raised to the rank of count, also descended from the Lords of Brederode. An illegitimate line, Heeren von Bolswaert, who held the title "Reichsgraf von Brederode" (Imperial Count) continued until 1832. Furthermore, it is said that there is still a non-noble line of the Brederode family today. This family claim that their roots goes back to Dirk Walravensz van Brederode, who was later declared the legitimate son of Walraven van Brederode († 1369), the younger brother of Reinoud I van Brederode.

== Heraldry ==
The coat of arms of the family is depicted in the medieval Gelre Armorial (folio 83r).

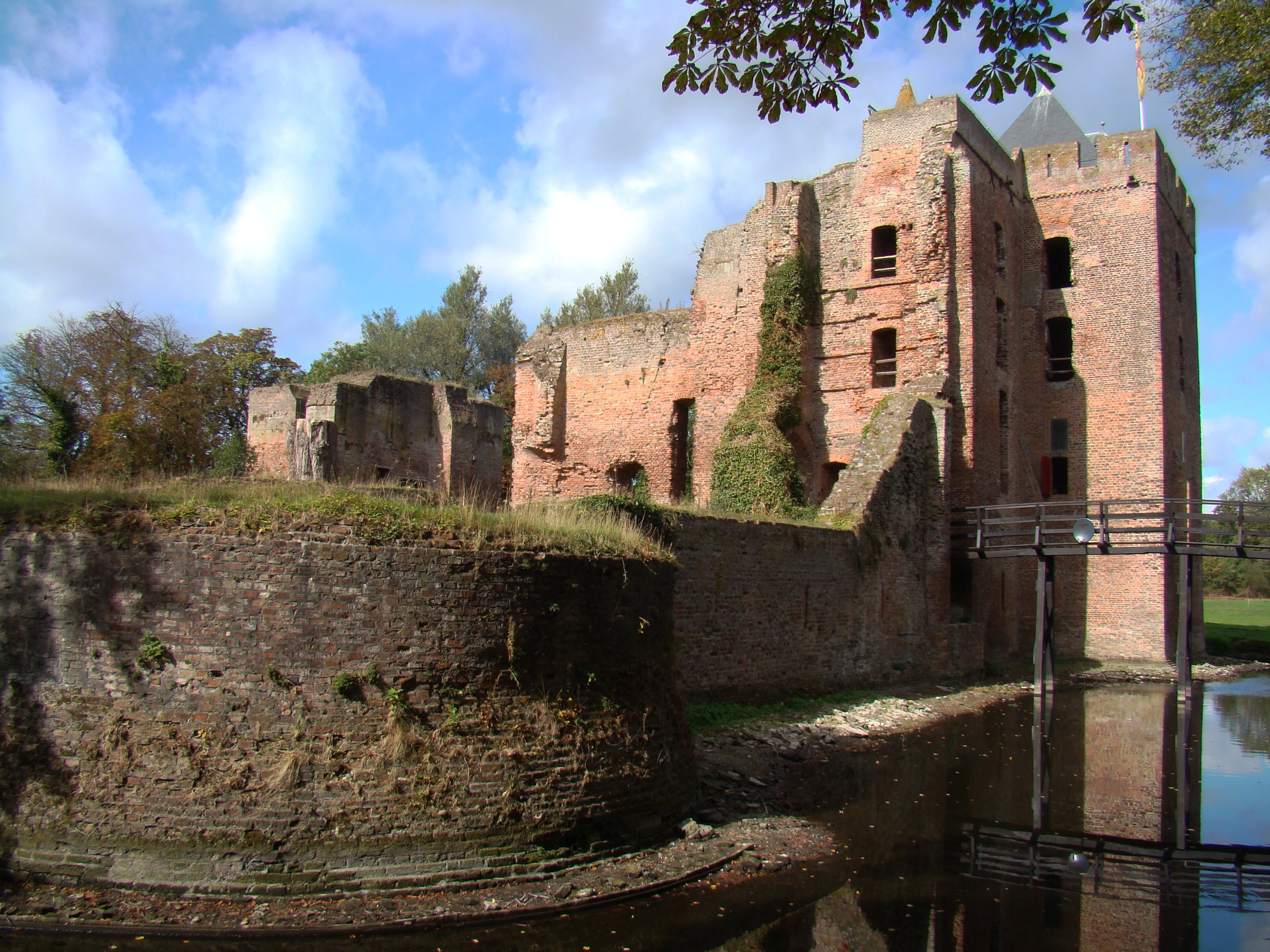
Picture of Castle Brederode, in Santpoort-Zuid.

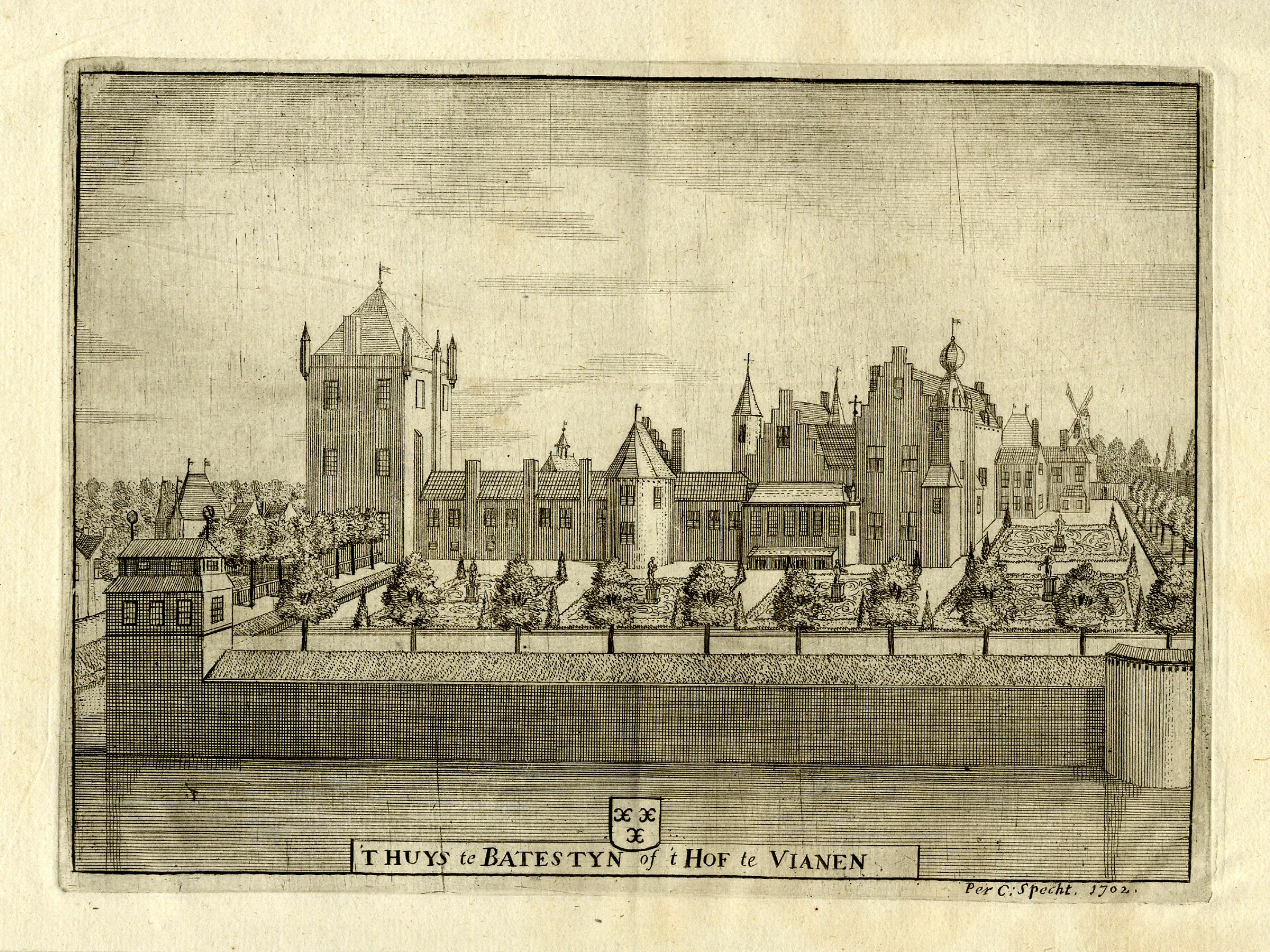
Picture of Batestein Castle, the main seat in Vianen

== Family tree ==
- William van Teylingen (1156–1203)
  - Dirk I van Brederode (1180–1236) m. Alveradis van Heusden
    - William I van Brederode (1236–1285) m. Hildegonde van Voorne d.1302
      - Dirk II van Brederode (1252–1318) m. Maria van der Lecke
        - Katharina van Brederode (-1372) m. John I, Lord of Polanen
        - Hendrik I van Brederode (-1345)
        - William II van Brederode (-1316) m. Elisabeth von Kleve
          - Dirk III van Brederode (1308–1377) m. Beatrix van Valkenburg d.1354
            - Reinoud I van Brederode (1336–1390) m. Johanna van Gennep d.1413
              - Jan I van Brederode (1370/72–1415)
              - Walraven I van Brederode (1370/73–1417) m. Johanna van Vianen en Ameide d. 1418
                - Reinoud II van Brederode (1415–1473) m. Yolanthe de Lalaing d. 1497
                  - Walraven II van Brederode (1455–1531) m. Margaretha van Borselen d. 1507
                    - Reinoud III van Brederode (15??–1584) m. Philippine von der Marck, d. 1539
                      - Hendrick II van Brederode (1531–1568) m. Amalia von Neuenahr d.1602
                    - Wolfert van Brederode (1495–1548) m. Adriana Back van Asten
                      - Reinoud IV van Brederode (1520–1584)m. Margaretha van Doorne
                        - Walraven III van Brederode (1547–1614) m. Gulielma van Haeften
                        - Floris van Brederode (-1599) m. Dorothea van Haeften
                          - Walraven IV van Brederode (1596–1620)
                          - Johan Wolfert van Brederode (1599–1655)m.1 Anne Joanne of Nassau-Siegen (1594–1636) m.2 Louise Christina zu Solms-Braunfels (1606–1669)
                            - Amalia Margaretha van Brederode (1625–1663)
                            - Hendrik III van Brederode (1638-1657)
                            - Wolfert van Brederode (1649-1679)
                  - Frans van Brederode (1465–1490)
                - Gijsbrecht van Brederode (1416–1475)
              - William van Brederode (1380–1451)

== See also ==
- Castle Brederode
- Lancelot van Brederode (killed 1573), illegitimate son of Reinoud III van Brederode

== Literature ==
- Detlev Schwennicke, Europäische Stammtafeln Band XVIII (2012) Tafel 39–40.
