= Santpoort-Zuid =

- Village
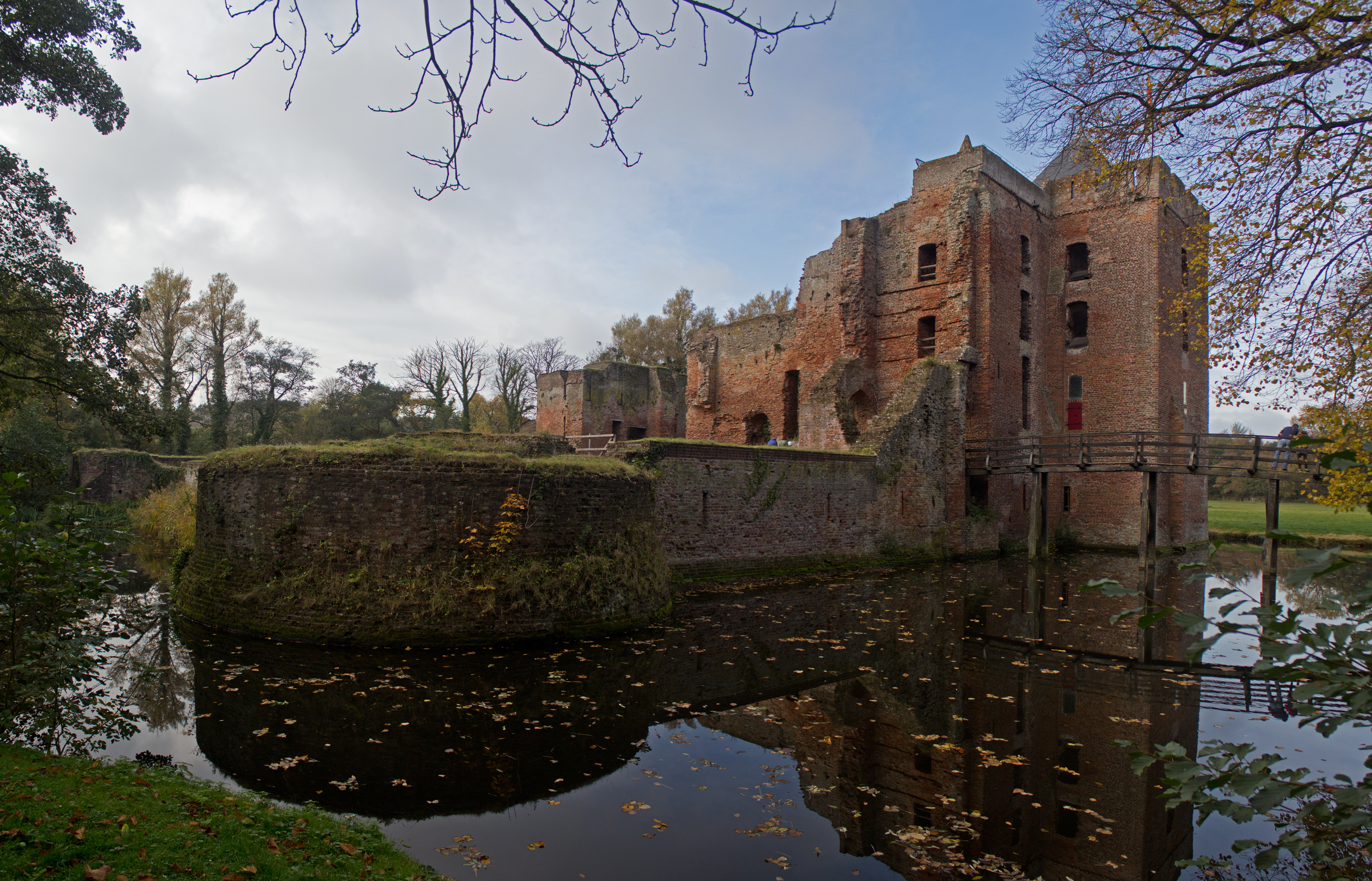
- Brederode Castle

- Location in the Netherlands Location in the province of North Holland in the Netherlands
- Coordinates: 52°25′N 4°38′E
- Country: Netherlands
- Province: North Holland
- Municipality: Velsen

Area
  - Total: 2.06 km^{2} (0.80 sq mi)
- Elevation: 4.7 m (15 ft)

Population (2021)
  - Total: 3,370
  - Density: 1,640/km^{2} (4,240/sq mi)
- Time zone: UTC+1 (CET)
  - Summer (DST): UTC+2 (CEST)
- Postal code: 2082
- Dialing code: 023
- Website: Tourist Info about Santpoort

Santpoort-Zuid (Dutch pronunciation: [ˌsɑntpoːrt ˈsœyt]; Santpoort South) is a village in the municipality of Velsen in the Dutch province of North Holland. It lies to the west of North Haarlem (Schoten). Santpoort-Zuid is bordered by the village of Bloemendaal to the south and the village of Santpoort-Noord to the north. There is a railway station in the village with a connection to Amsterdam Centraal station. The village is an upscale neighborhood with Dutch professionals residing there. It is one of the rare coastal forested areas protected by large dunes.

== History ==
A famous historic site in Santpoort-Zuid is the Ruin of Brederode, as well as the formerly well-maintained Natuurbad, Velserend.

1941 newsreel by Polygoon-Profilti of people swimming at the Velserend baths

Near the village are the ruins of the 13th-century Brederode Castle.

== Railway station ==
Santpoort-Zuid is served by Santpoort Zuid railway station.
