= Santpoort-Noord =

- Village
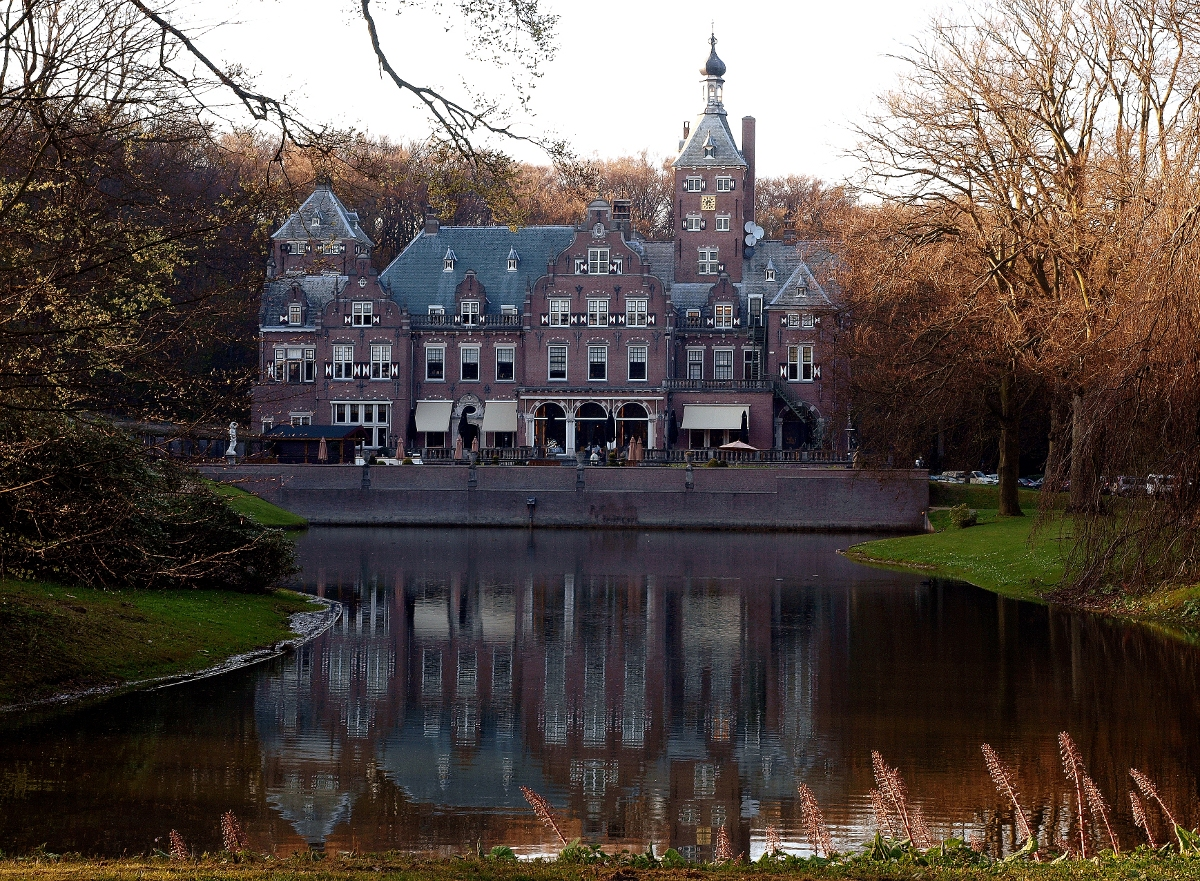
- Castle Duin en Kruidberg

- Location in the Netherlands Location in the province of North Holland in the Netherlands
- Coordinates: 52°25′21″N 4°37′34″E
- Country: Netherlands
- Province: North Holland
- Municipality: Velsen

Area
  - Total: 7.03 km^{2} (2.71 sq mi)
- Elevation: 1.2 m (3.9 ft)

Population (2021)
  - Total: 7,240
  - Density: 1,030/km^{2} (2,670/sq mi)
- Time zone: UTC+1 (CET)
  - Summer (DST): UTC+2 (CEST)
- Postal code: 2071
- Dialing code: 023

Santpoort-Noord (Dutch pronunciation: [ˌsɑntpoːrt ˈnoːrt]; Santpoort North) is a village in the municipality of Velsen in the Dutch province of North Holland. It lies directly north of Haarlem.

Santpoort developed in the dunes near the Brederode Castle (13th century).

Santpoort Noord’s history dates back to medieval times, with its name deriving from the word “sand,” indicative of its location near sand dunes. The village’s development was significantly influenced by its proximity to the city of Haarlem and the strategic coastal defenses.

== Railway station ==
In 1957, Santpoort Noord railway station opened on the Haarlem to Uitgeest railway line. Between 1953 and 1983, there was also a railway line to IJmuiden.
