= Santpoort =

Santpoort is a town in North Holland, Netherlands consisting of two parts, with a combined population of 10,610 in 2023:

- Santpoort-Noord, a village with a population of 7,270 in 2023
- Santpoort-Zuid, a village with a population of 3,385 in 2023

== Notable persons ==
- René Descartes, French philosopher
- Dick Schoof (born 1957), Dutch civil servant and politician, Prime Minister of the Netherlands from 2024 to 2026

== See also ==
- Velsen
