= Pieter Nason =

Dutch painter

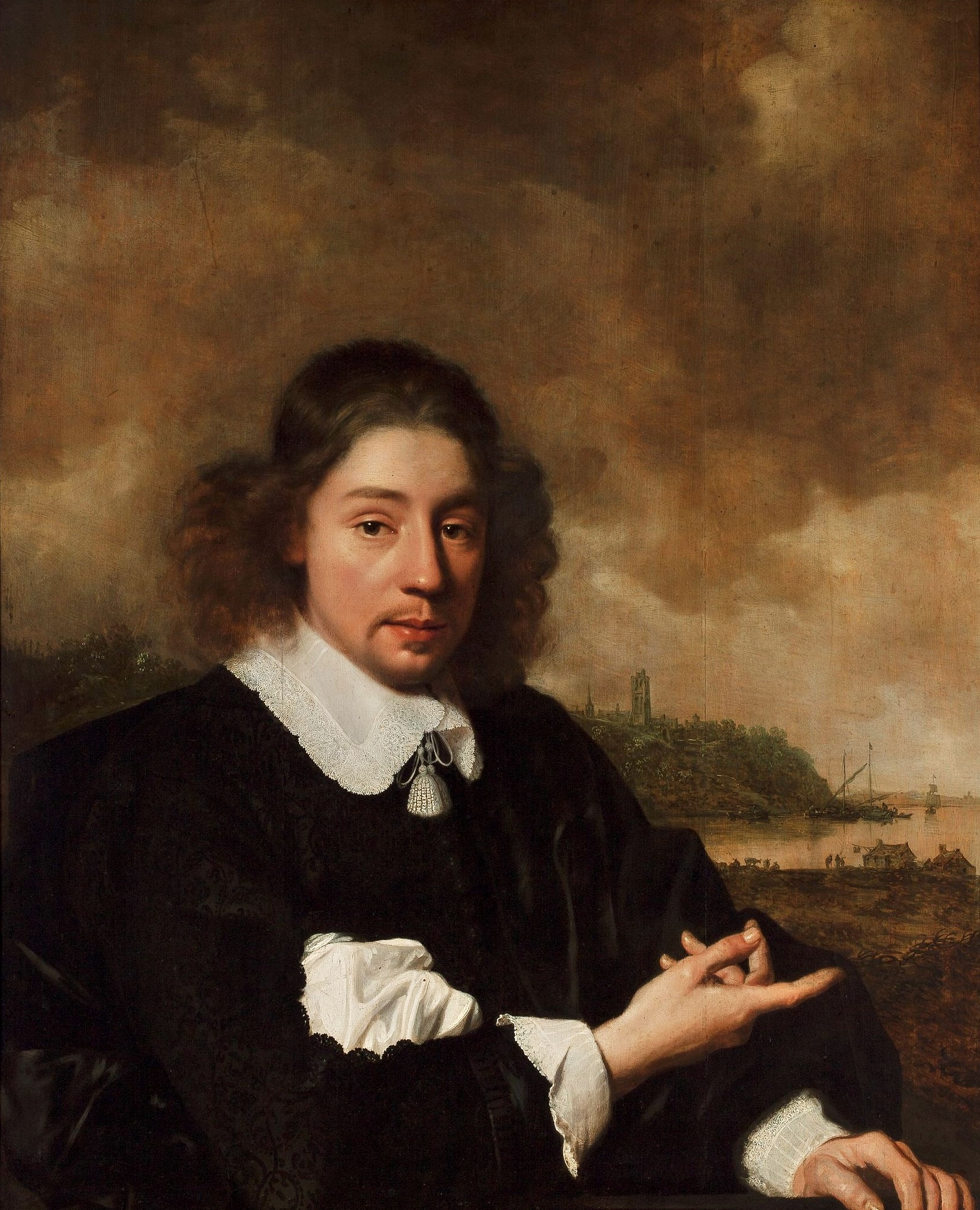
Self-portrait before a landscape by Jan van Goyen,1648

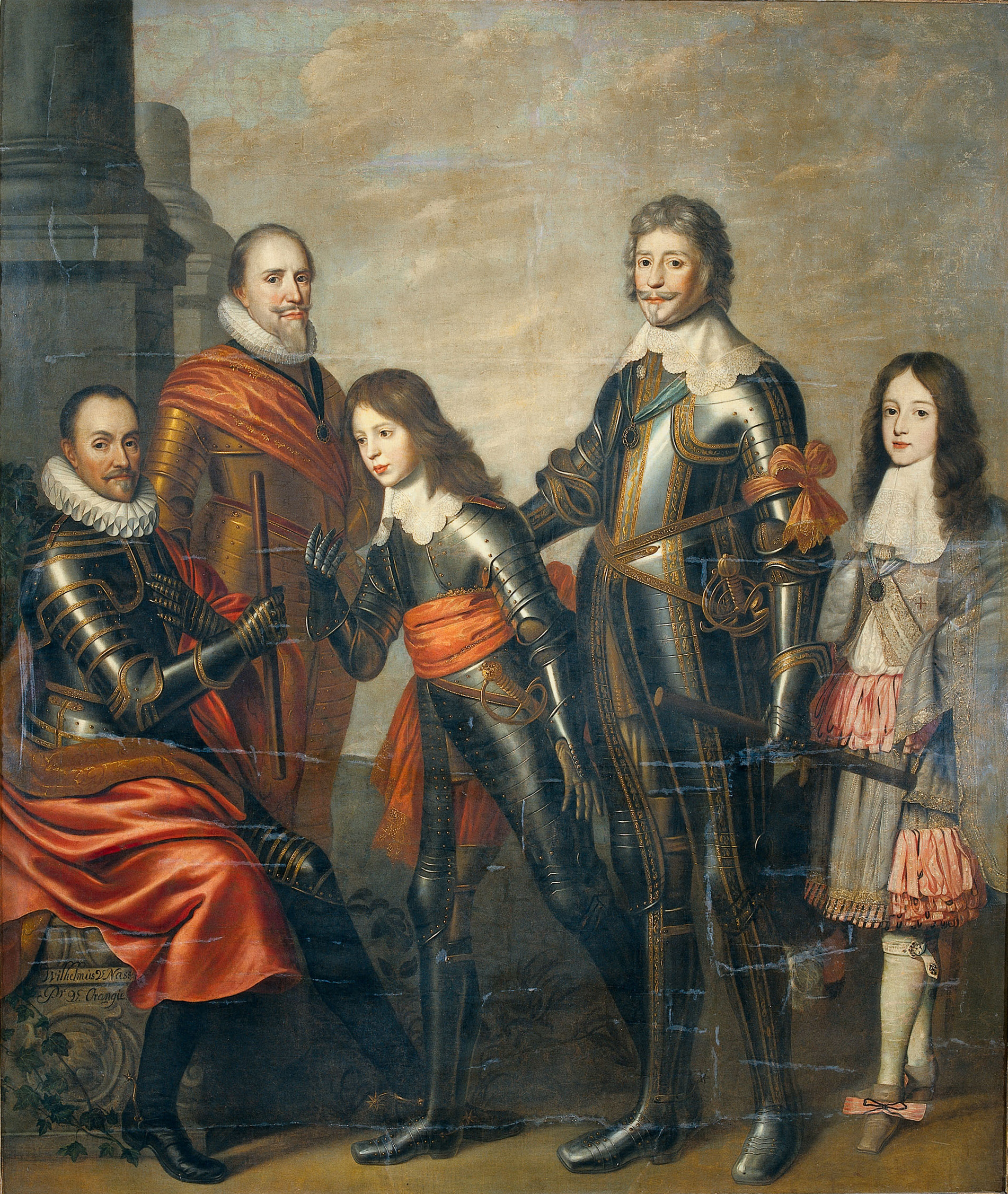
Four generations Princes of Orange - William I, Maurice and Frederick Henry, William II, William III, 1662

Pieter Nason (bapt. 16 February 1612, Amsterdam - 1688/90, The Hague) was a Dutch painter. He became a member of the Guild of Painters of The Hague in 1639, and in 1656 was one of the forty seven members who established the Pictura Society. From a MS. by Pieter Terwesten, it appears not improbable that Nason was a pupil of Jan van Ravensteyn; and it is believed that his name has been effaced from pictures since attributed to Mierevelt, Moreelse, and above all to Ravensteyn. It is certain that he painted the portrait of Prince Mauritz, Governor of the Brazils, engraved by Houbraken, and those of Charles the Second of England, engraved by C. Van Dalen and Sandrart, and of the Grand Elector. At Berlin there is a full-length portrait, dated 1667, of the latter, by Nason; also a still life, representing gold, silver, and glass vessels, likewise a portrait by him signed and dated 1670. There are others at Copenhagen and at Rotterdam. The date of his death is not known, but his life was long. Redgrave gives the initial of his Christian name wrongly as R.
