= Amalia Margaretha van Brederode =

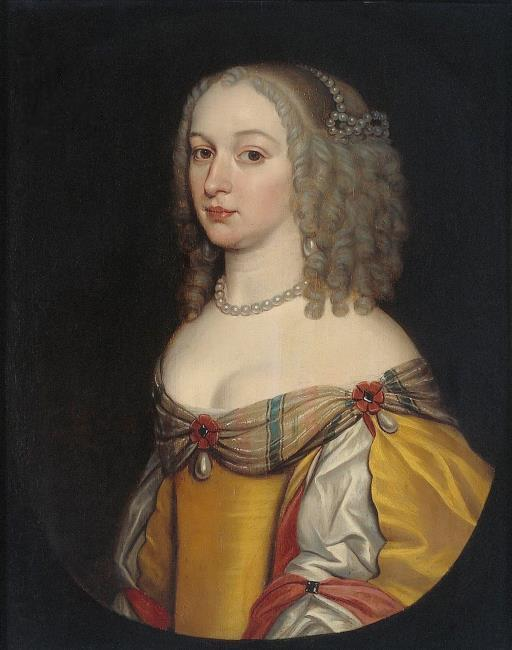
Amalia Margarethe van Brederode by Gerard van Honthorst

Amalia Margaretha van Brederode (1625–1663), was a Dutch salon holder and member of the Van Brederode noble family. She has been referred to as the first female to have played an autonomous and leading role in the high society of the Netherlands. She was the founder and leader of the order Ordre de l'Union de la Joye (1645). She also played a leading role in Brussels during the stay of queen Christina of Sweden there in the 1650s.
