= Brederode Castle =

Castle ruins near Haarlem, NL

- Kasteel Brederode / Ruïne van Brederode
- Santpoort Zuid, the Netherlands
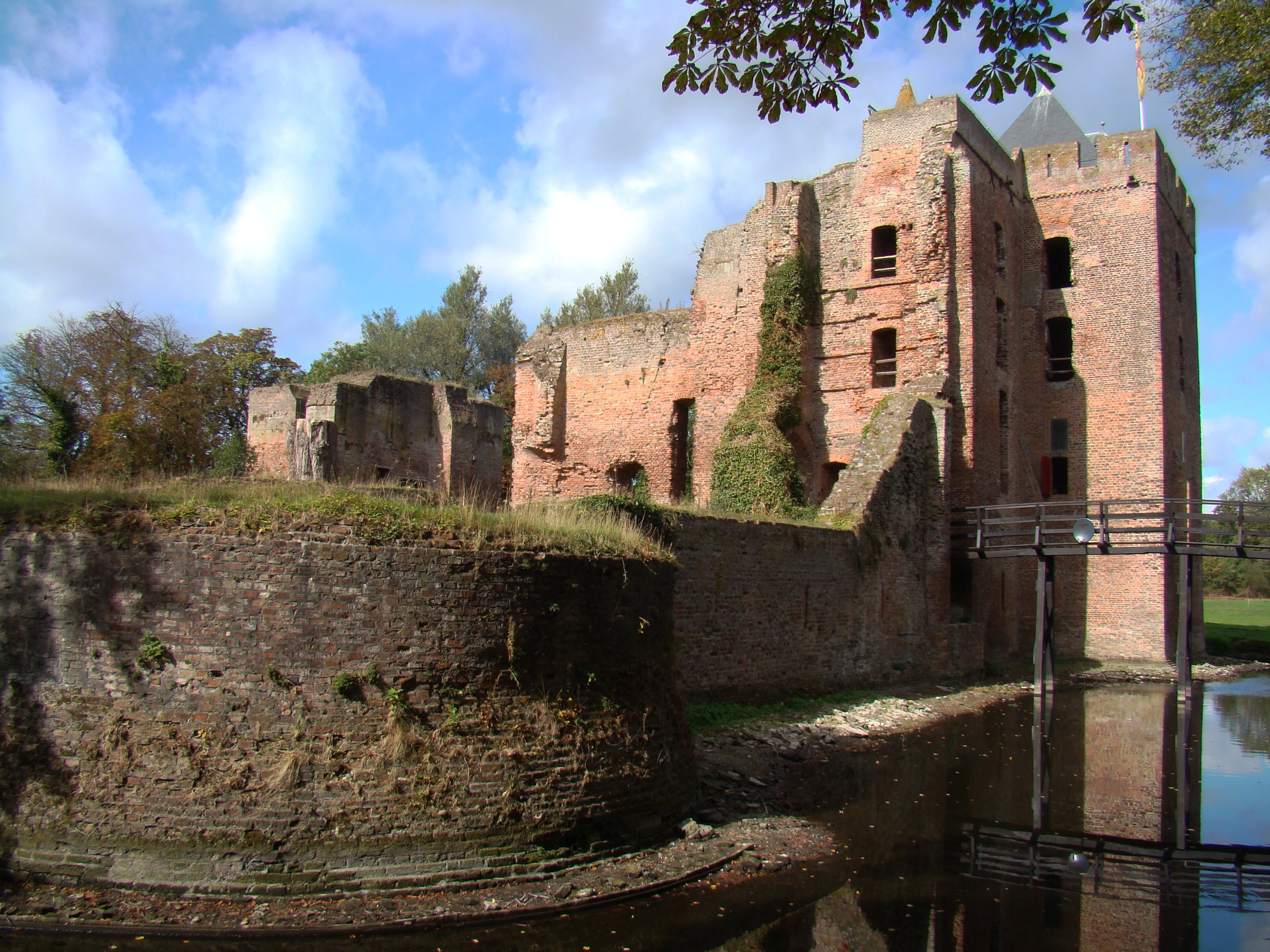
- The Ruins of Brederode

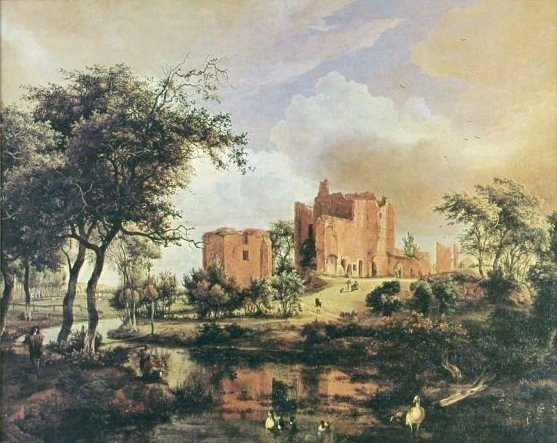
- Meindert Hobbema (17th century)

Site information
- Type: Castle
- Open to the public: Yes
- Condition: Ruin

Location
- The Netherlands
- Coordinates: 52.4253°N 4.6225°E

Site history
- Built: 13th century
- Built by: William I van Brederode
- Materials: Brick

Brederode Castle (Dutch: Kasteel Brederode), also called the Ruins of Brederode (Dutch: Ruïne van Brederode), is located near Santpoort-Zuid. The castle was founded in the second half of the 13th century by William I van Brederode (1215–1285). William was a descendant of the lords van Teylingen, who were related to the counts of Holland. The castle formed part of the high lordship Brederode, which had been given in loan in the 13th century to the lords of Brederode by the count of Holland.

The name Brederode is a reference to a wooded area called Brede Roede (literally: broad wood), that was cleared and on which the castle was built. The castle was at first not more than a tower, but around 1300 Dirk II van Brederode had the tower pulled down and replaced with a proper castle.

== History ==
=== Siege of 1351 ===
During the Hook and Cod wars, the Brederode family stayed loyal to Margaret of Bavaria. In 1351 the castle was besieged by Gijsbrecht van Nijenrode, who supported the opposing Cod faction. The castle surrendered by treaty on 23 October 1351. By this treaty the (unnamed) Lord of Brederode made his peace with Count William, and would receive a yearly allowance of 350 pounds while his lands were put under sequester for the time being. The castellan and garrison were banished and allowed to leave with half their possessions. After the surrender of the castle, it was so badly damaged that it was demolished.

=== Rebuild of the castle ===
After the reconciliation of the Brederode family and the counts of Holland in 1354, the castle was rebuilt. The current floor plan of the castle dates from this rebuild. It was no longer used as living space, but it did remain a base of strategic importance for the Hook faction, led by William van Brederode. The Brederode family self had moved its main seat to Batestein Castle.

When the Hook faction besieged Haarlem in 1426, the Cod faction destroyed the southern part of the castle. William was forbidden to repair or enforce the castle, leaving it in a damaged state. Eventually in 1464 the north part of the castle was allowed to be restored. During the Rise of the cheese and bread people in 1492, the castle was plundered by German soldiers. Since then it was no longer inhabited. In 1568 it fell to the States of Holland.

After the defeat of the Geuzen at the Battle of Haarlemmermeer, Haarlem had to surrender to the Spanish soldiers in 1573 after the Siege of Haarlem. As a result, the Protestant Lancelot van Brederode was beheaded and the castle was plundered and set on fire. Following this the castle was threatened by encroaching dunes. In 1579 Holland loaned the lordship to a side branch of the van Brederode family. In 1679, Wolfert van Brederode, last lord of Brederode, died, and the ruins became property of the States of Holland and the Dutch Republic. Ever since, the ruins have been property of the State. In the 19th century the ruins were one of the first buildings to be restored by the government, and they became the first national monument of the Netherlands.

== Pictures ==
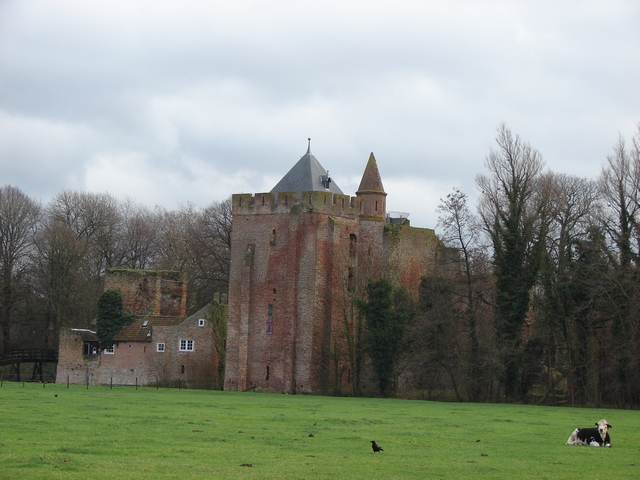
View from the Velserenderlaan

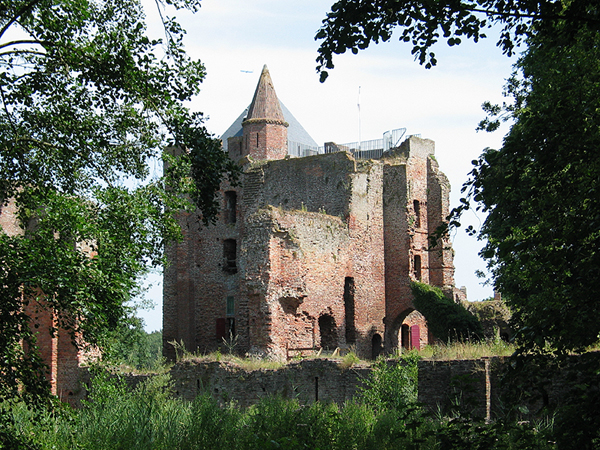
Brederode

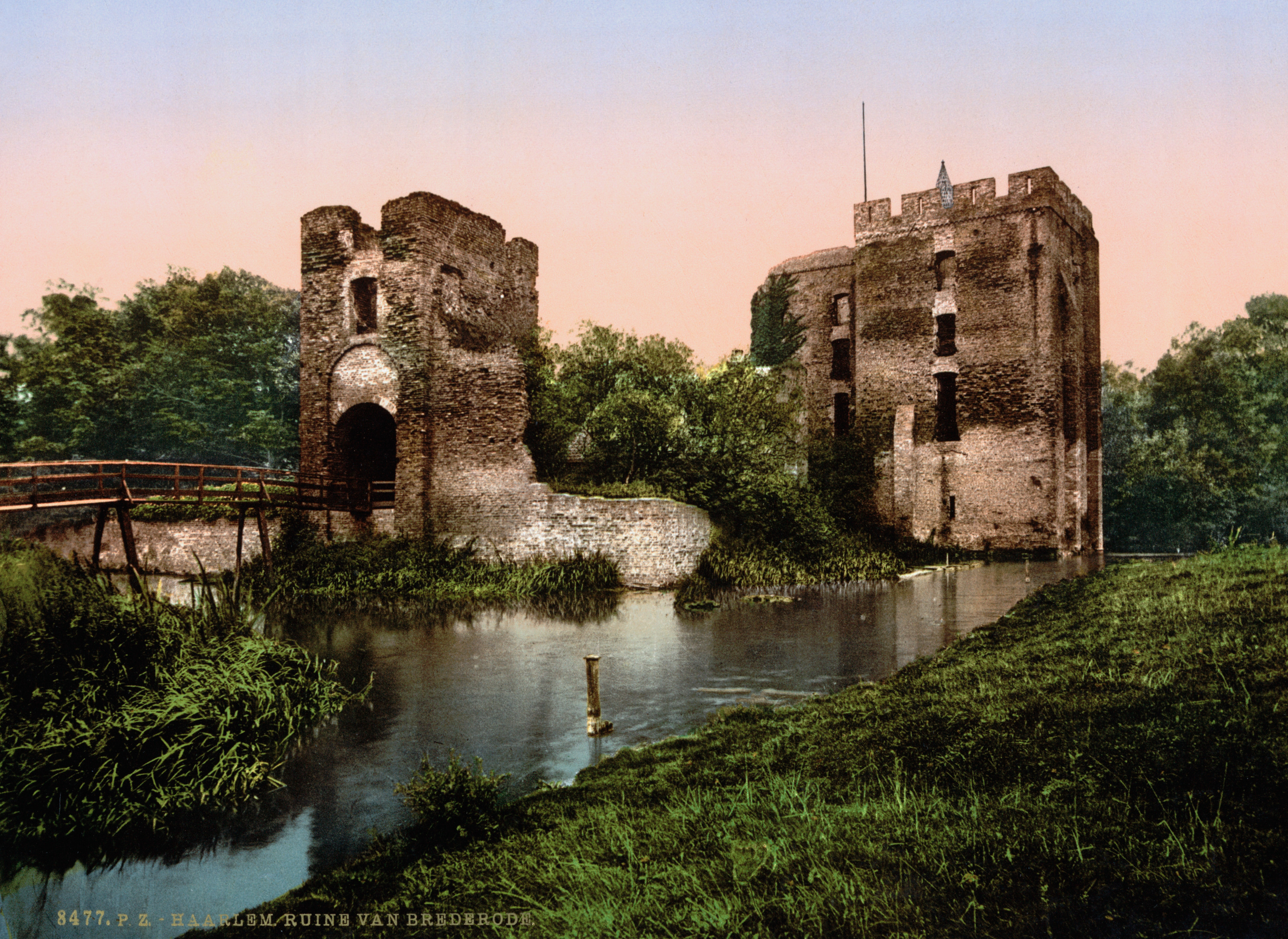
Around 1900

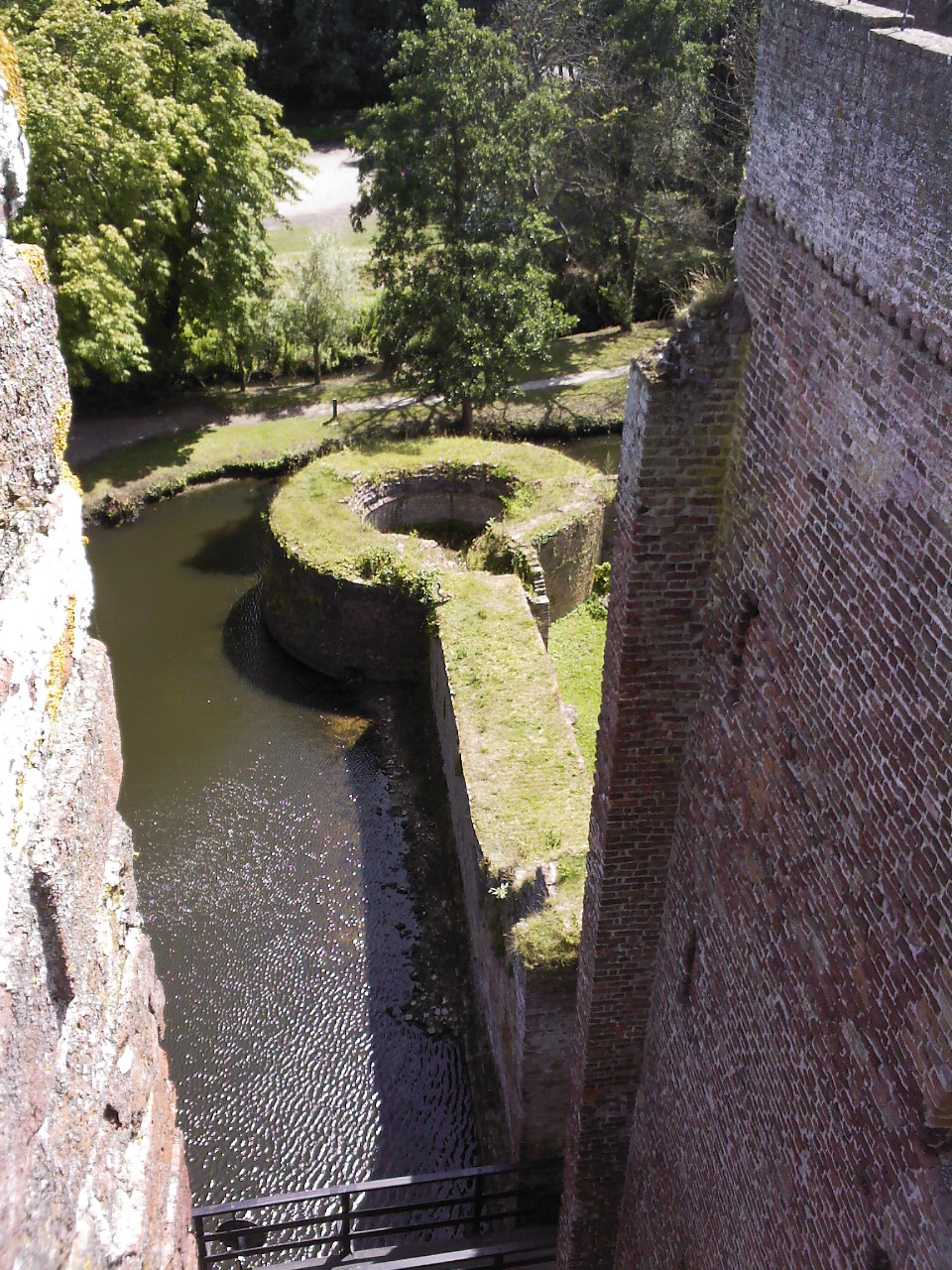
View down on the foundation of the north-eastern tower

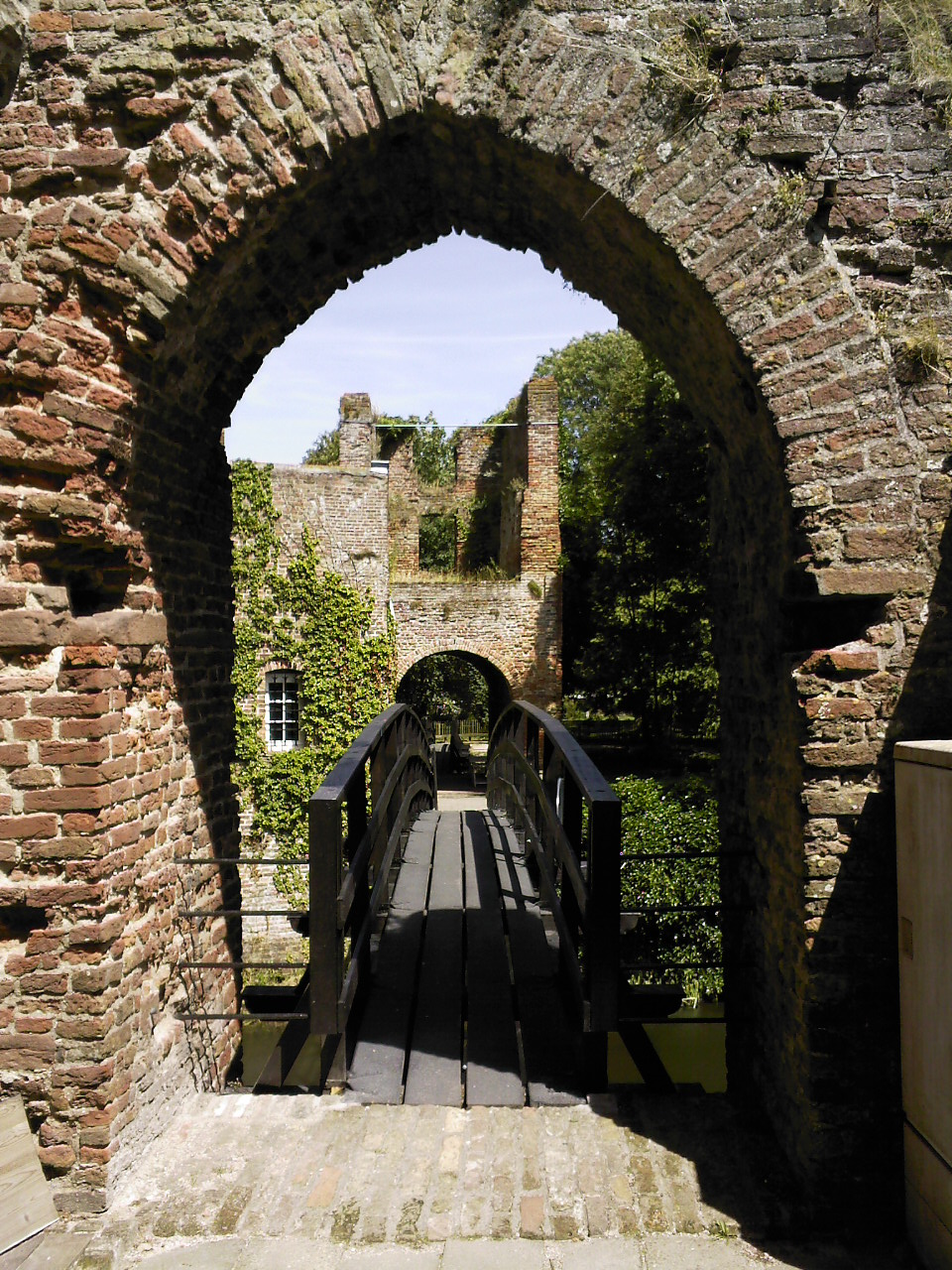
View through the main gate on the front castle

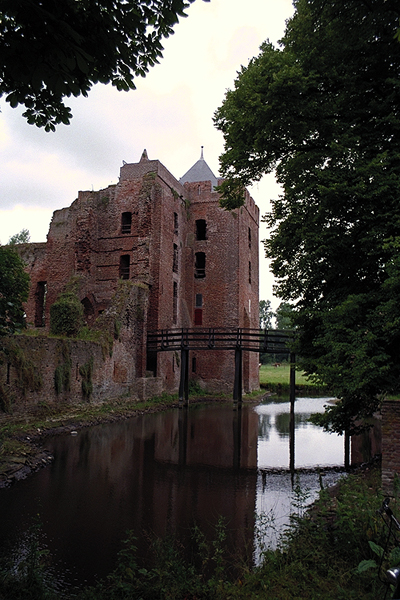
The Ruins of Brederode

== See also ==
- List of castles in the Netherlands
