= Zederik =

- Former municipality
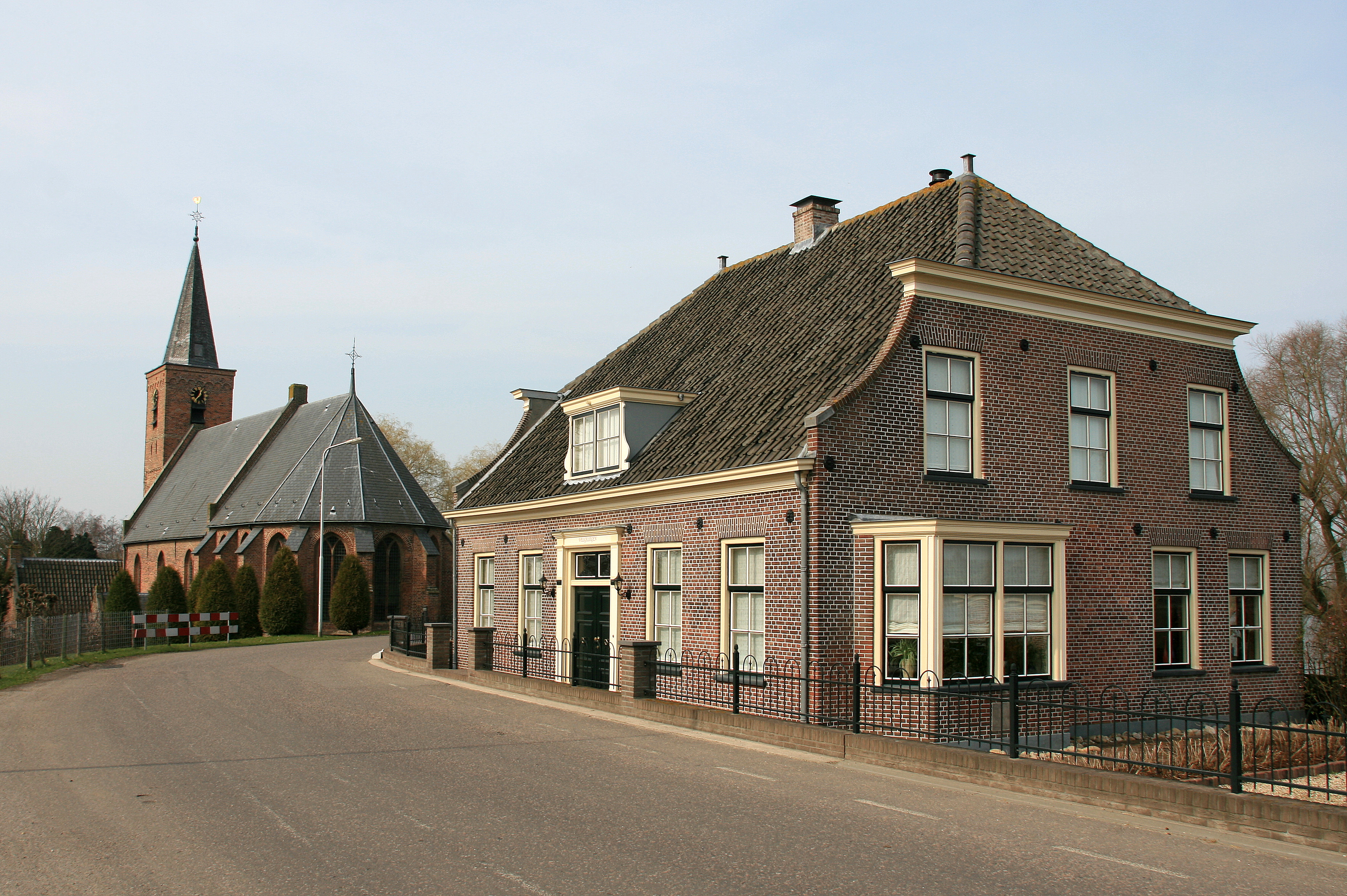
- Skyline of Tienhoven aan de Lek

- Flag Coat of arms

- Location in South Holland
- Coordinates: 51°55′N 5°0′E
- Country: Netherlands
- Province: South Holland
- Established: January 1, 1986
- Extinct: January 1, 2019

Area
  - Total: 76.50 km^{2} (29.54 sq mi)
  - Land: 73.73 km^{2} (28.47 sq mi)
  - Water: 2.77 km^{2} (1.07 sq mi)
- Elevation: 0 m (0 ft)

Population (January 2021)
  - Total: data missing
- Time zone: UTC+1 (CET)
  - Summer (DST): UTC+2 (CEST)
- Postcode: 4126–4128, 4230–4235, 4243, 4245
- Area code: 0183, 0345, 0347
- Website: www.zederik.nl

Zederik (Dutch pronunciation: [ˈzeːdərɪk]) is a former municipality in the western Netherlands, in the province of South Holland. The municipality covered an area of 76.50 km^{2} (29.54 sq mi) of which 2.77 km^{2} (1.07 sq mi) is water. It had a population of 55000.

The municipality of Zederik was formed on January 1, 1986, through the merger of the former municipalities of Ameide, Hei- en Boeicop, Leerbroek, Lexmond, Meerkerk, Nieuwland, and Tienhoven aan de Lek. Zederik merged with Leerdam and Vianen into the municipality of Vijfheerenlanden in the province of Utrecht on January 1, 2019. The municipality was named after the Old Zederik, a small canal running through its area.

The population centres of Zederik consisted of Ameide, Hei- en Boeicop, Leerbroek, Lexmond, Meerkerk, Nieuwland, and Tienhoven aan de Lek.

== Topography ==
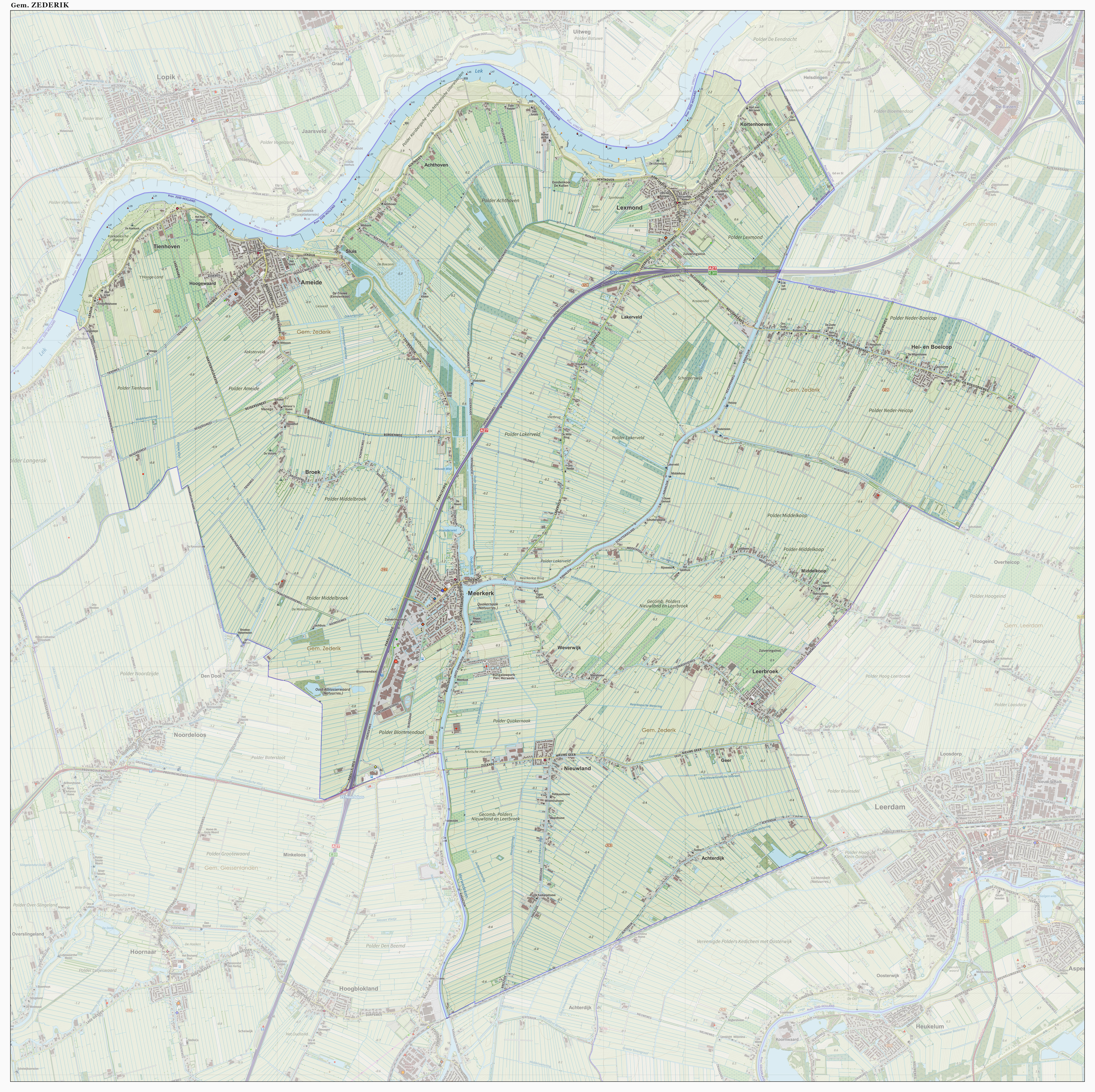

Dutch Topographic map of the municipality of Zederik, Sept. 2014.

== Notable people ==
- Maarten Schakel Sr. (1917–1997) politician
- Teun Kloek (born 1934) economist and Emeritus Professor of Econometrics at the Erasmus Universiteit Rotterdam
- Govert Schilling (born 1956) popular-science writer and amateur astronomer
- Rita de Jong (born 1965) rower, she competed at the 1992 Summer Olympics
- Robin Chaigneau (born 1988) former cyclist
