= Leerbroek =

- Village
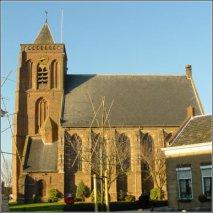
- Church of Leerbroek

- Location in the Netherlands Leerbroek (Netherlands)
- Coordinates: 51.9071°N 5.0497°E
- Country: Netherlands
- Province: Utrecht
- Municipality: Vijfheerenlanden

Area
  - Total: 3.59 km^{2} (1.39 sq mi)
- Elevation: −0.1 m (−0.33 ft)

Population (2021)
  - Total: 1,085
  - Density: 302/km^{2} (783/sq mi)
- Time zone: UTC+1 (CET)
  - Summer (DST): UTC+2 (CEST)
- Postal code: 4245
- Dialing code: 0345

Leerbroek is a village in the Dutch province of Utrecht. It is a part of the municipality of Vijfheerenlanden, and lies about 9 km (6 mi) northeast of Gorinchem.

Leerbroek was a separate municipality between 1817, when it was separated from Meerkerk, and 1986, when it merged with Zederik in the province of South Holland. When Zederik merged into the new municipality Vijfheerenlanden in 2019, it became a part of the province of Utrecht.

== History ==
The village was first mentioned between 1395 and 1396 as Lederbroec, and means "canal through swampy land". Leerbroek started as a cultivation project in the 12th century. The Dutch Reformed Church dated from the 16th century, but burnt down in 1935. It was rebuilt in 1936. In 1840, it was home to 214 people.

== Gallery ==
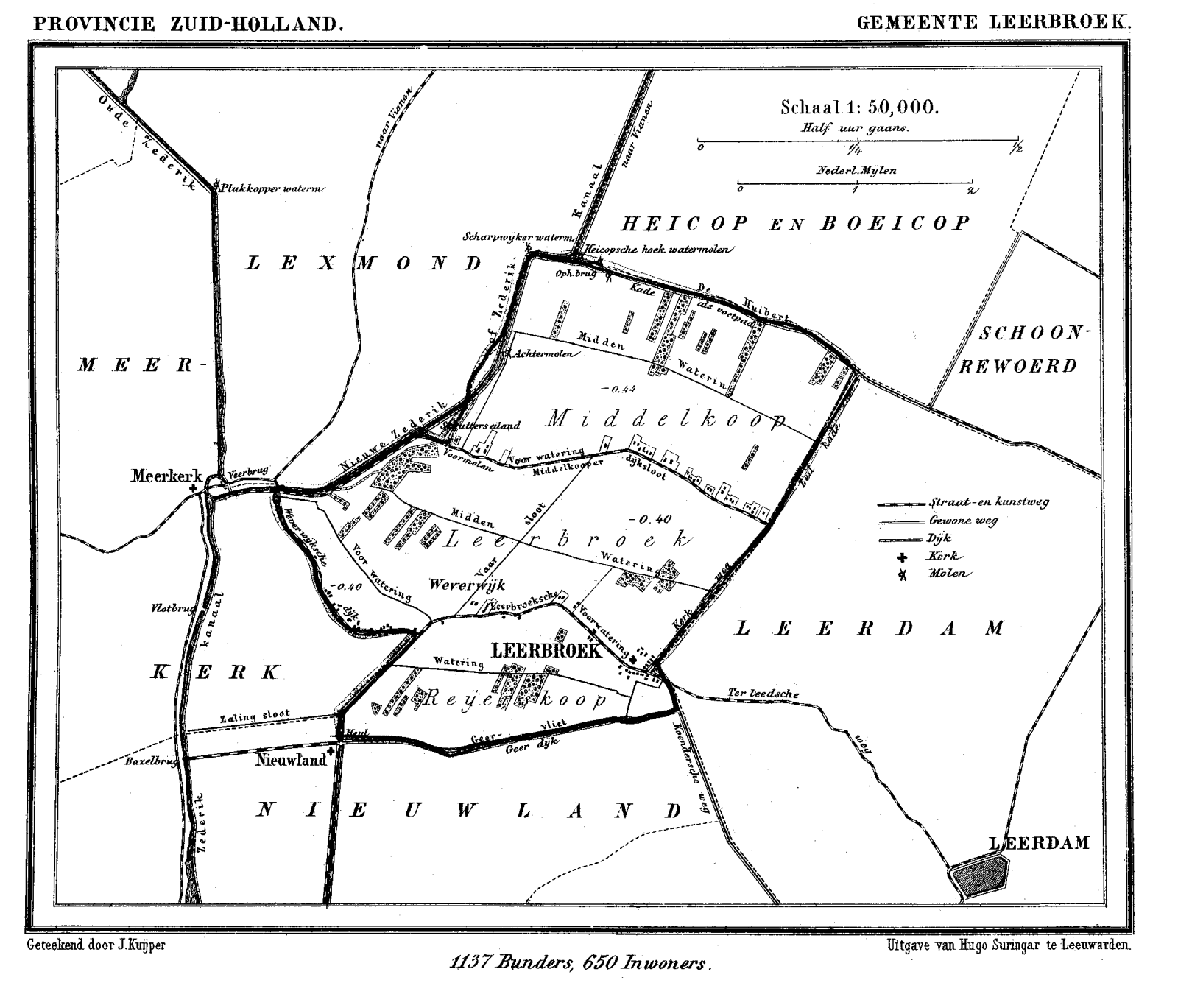
Map of the former municipality in 1866

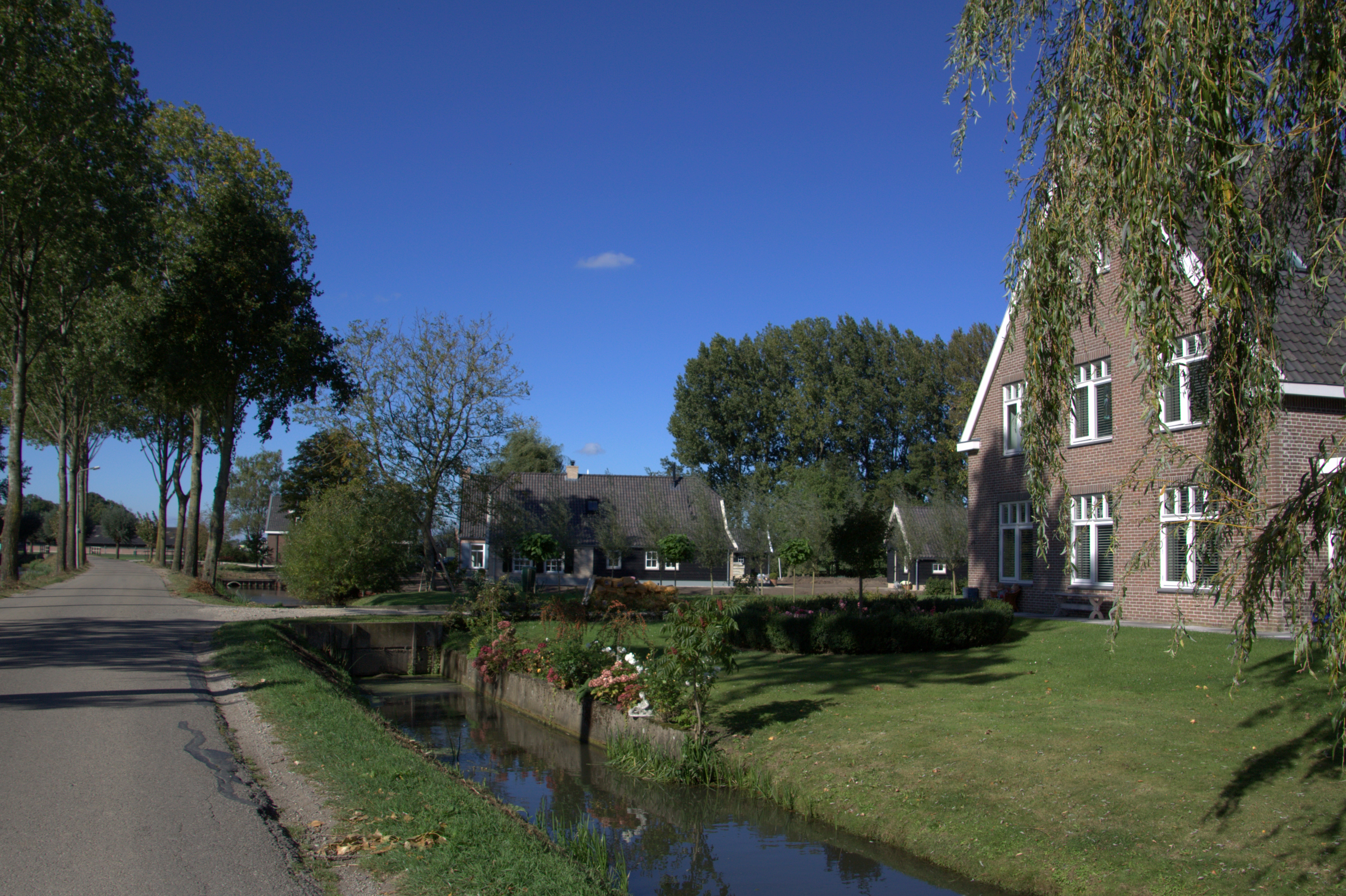
Farms in Leerbroek

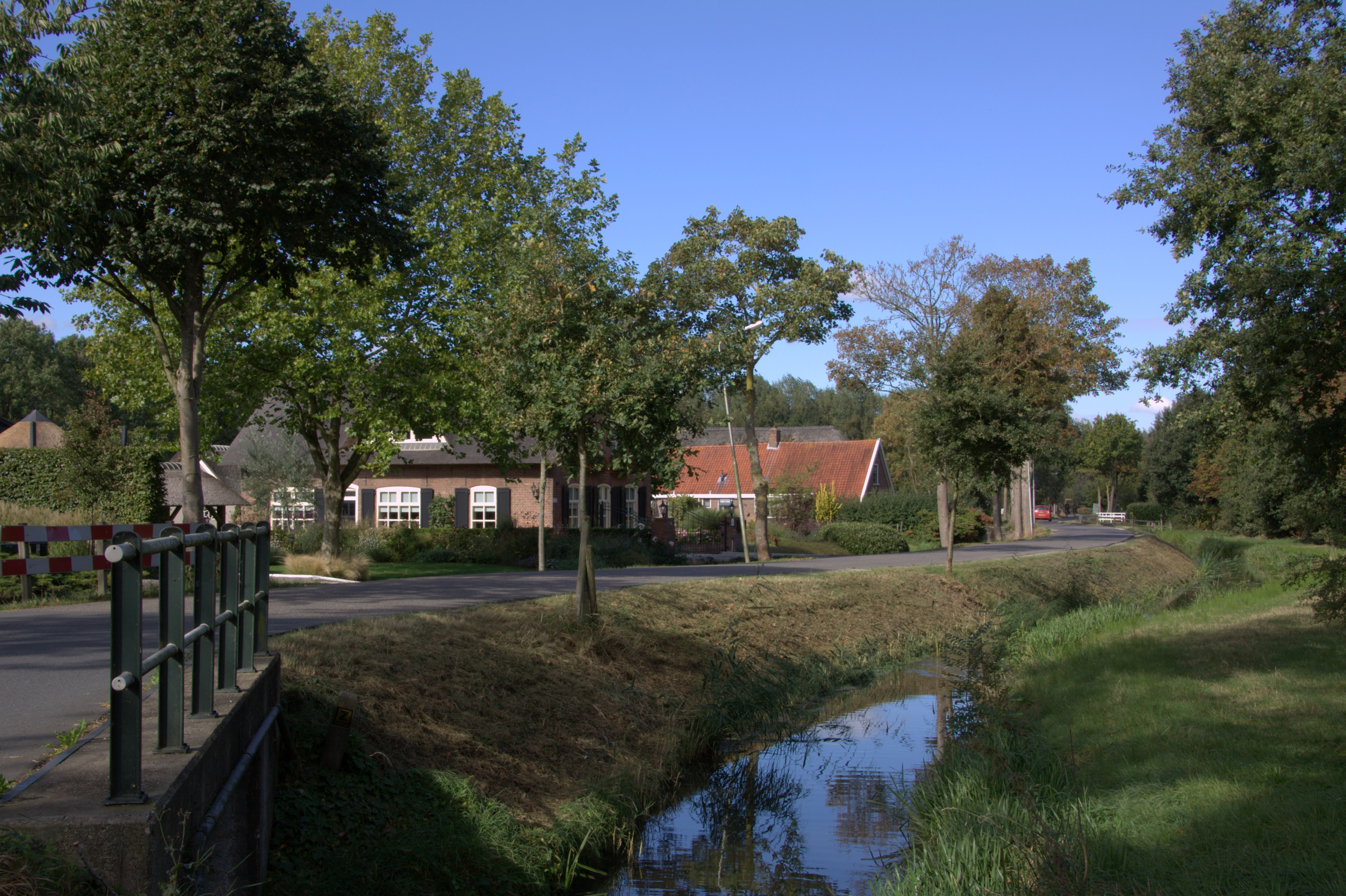
More farms

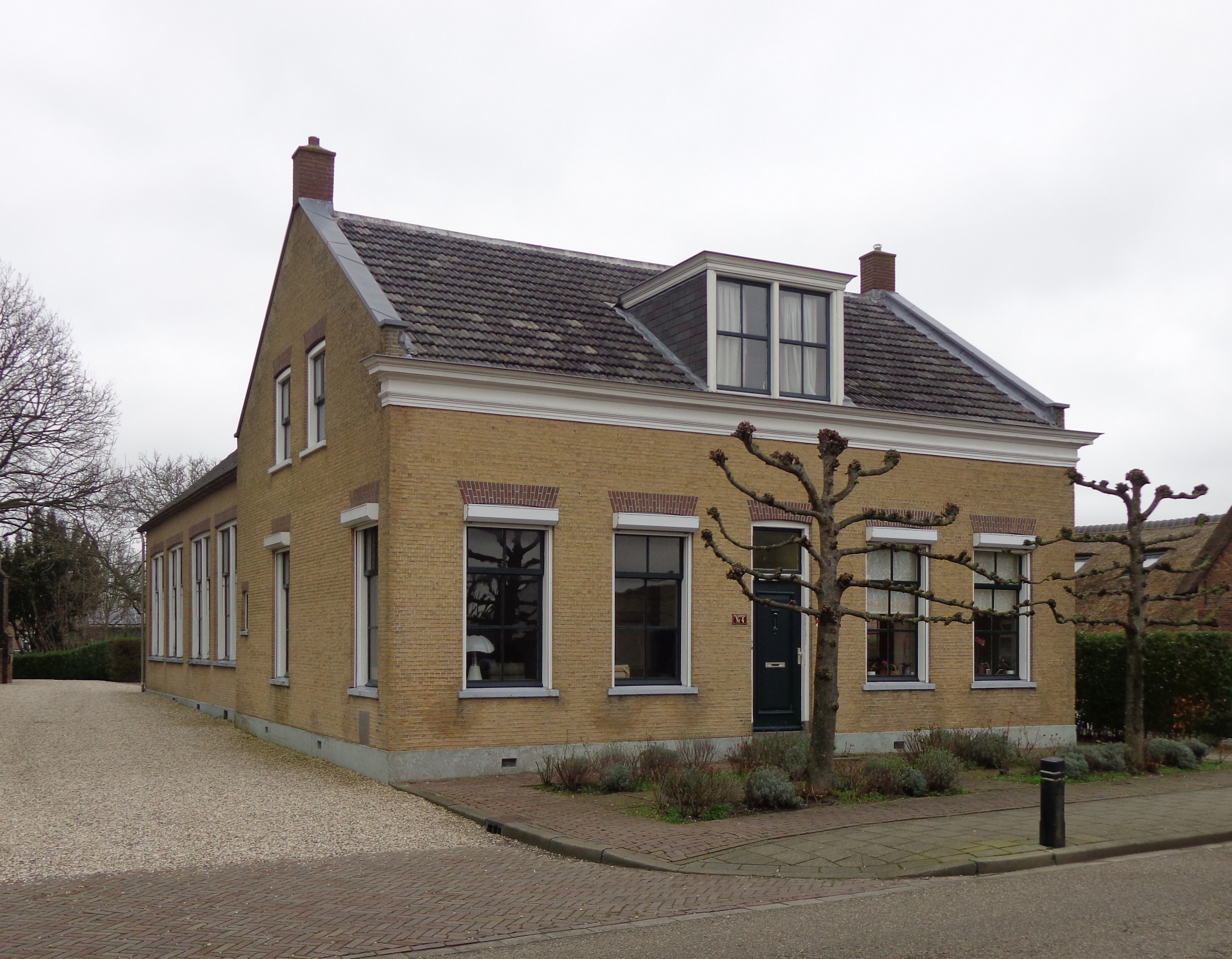
House in Leerbroek
