= Hei- en Boeicop =

- Village
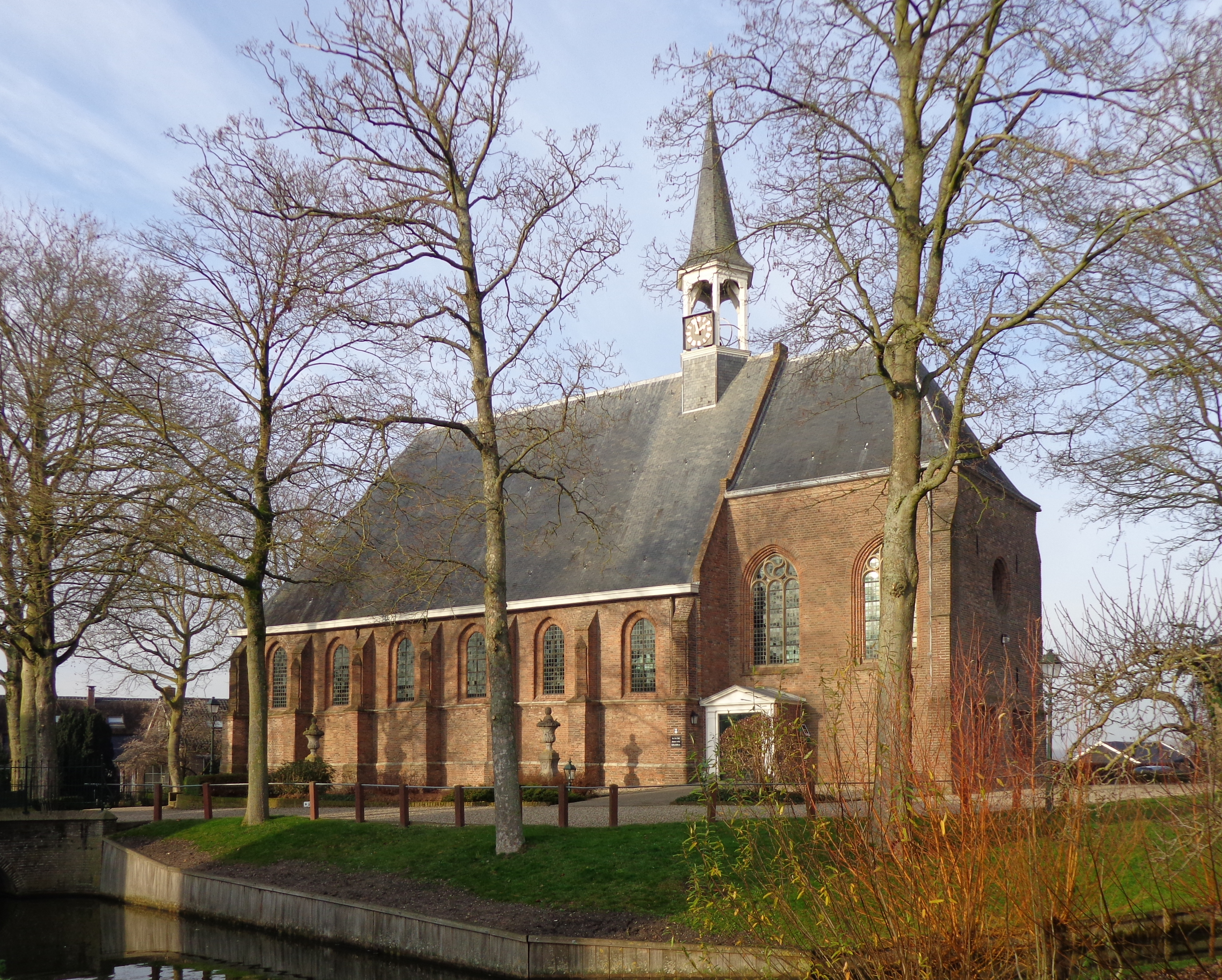
- Church of Hei- en Boeicop

- Location in the Netherlands Hei- en Boeicop (Netherlands)
- Coordinates: 51.9463°N 5.0706°E
- Country: Netherlands
- Province: Utrecht
- Municipality: Vijfheerenlanden

Area
  - Total: 8.69 km^{2} (3.36 sq mi)
- Elevation: 1 m (3.3 ft)

Population (2021)
  - Total: 1,100
  - Density: 130/km^{2} (330/sq mi)
- Time zone: UTC+1 (CET)
  - Summer (DST): UTC+2 (CEST)
- Postal code: 4126
- Dialing code: 0345

Hei- en Boeicop is a village in the Dutch province of Utrecht. Part of the municipality of Vijfheerenlanden, it lies about 9 km south of IJsselstein.

The village consists of a long row of houses on two sides of a small canal that separates the Polder Boeicop to the north from the Polder Heicop to the south.

Hei- en Boeicop was an independent municipality in the province of South Holland between 1817 and 1986, when it became part of Zederik. When Zederik merged into the new municipality Vijfheerenlanden in 2019, it became a part of the province of Utrecht.

== History ==
Hei- en Boeicop started as a large scale cultivation project with Boeicop on the northern side and Heicop in the south. Heicop was first mentioned in 1289 as Heicoep, and means concession of Heye. Boeicop was first mentioned in 1413 as Boyencaip and was the concession of Boye. The two settlements were separated by a canal. The Dutch Reformed Church dates from the 16th century. The tower was demolished between 1781 and 1830.

In 1840, Heicop was home to 255 people and Boeicop to 269 people. It is not clear when the two villages merged. In 2019, the village became part of Vijfheerenlanden and the province of Utrecht.

== Gallery ==
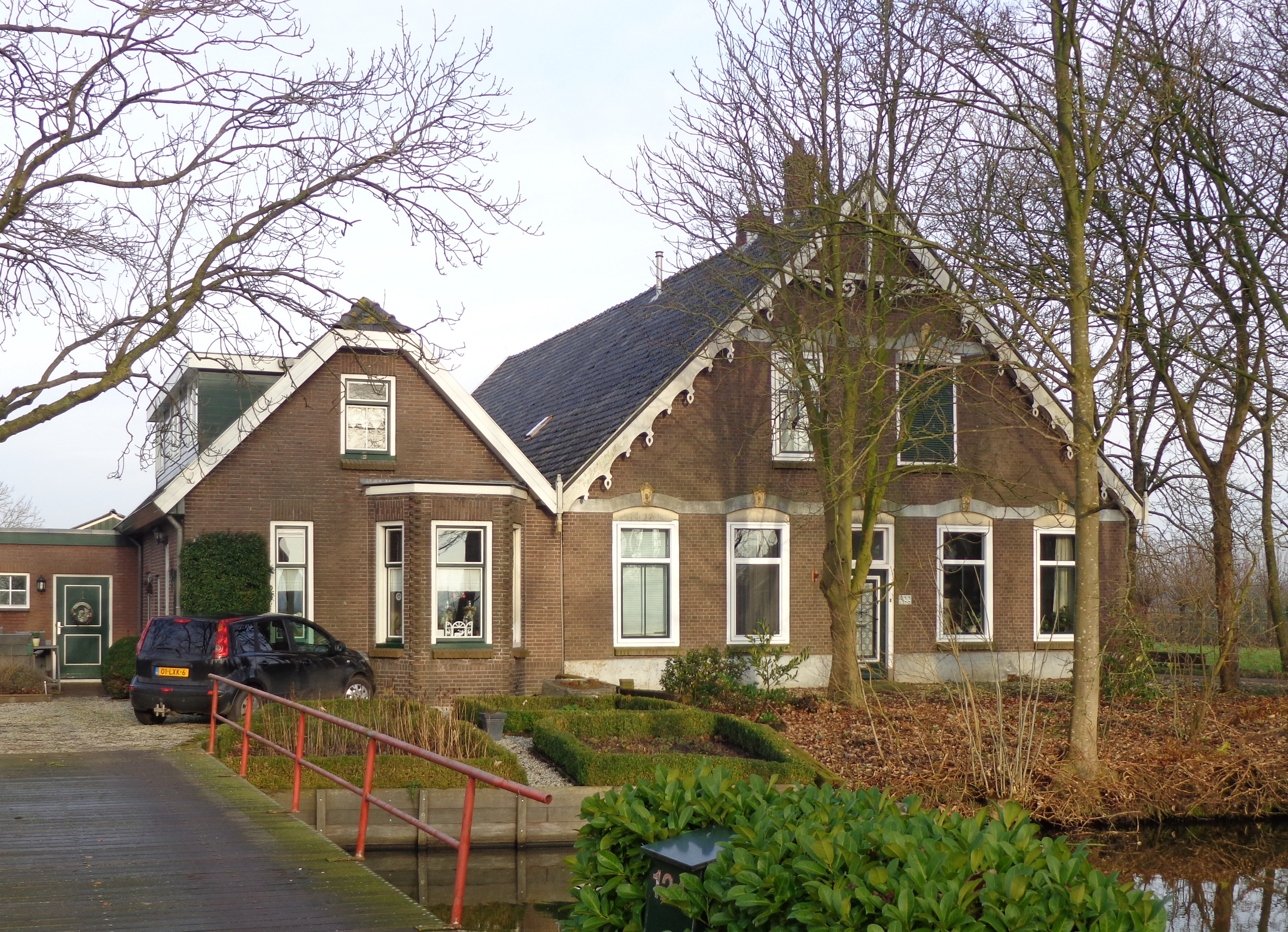
Farm in Hei- en Boeicop

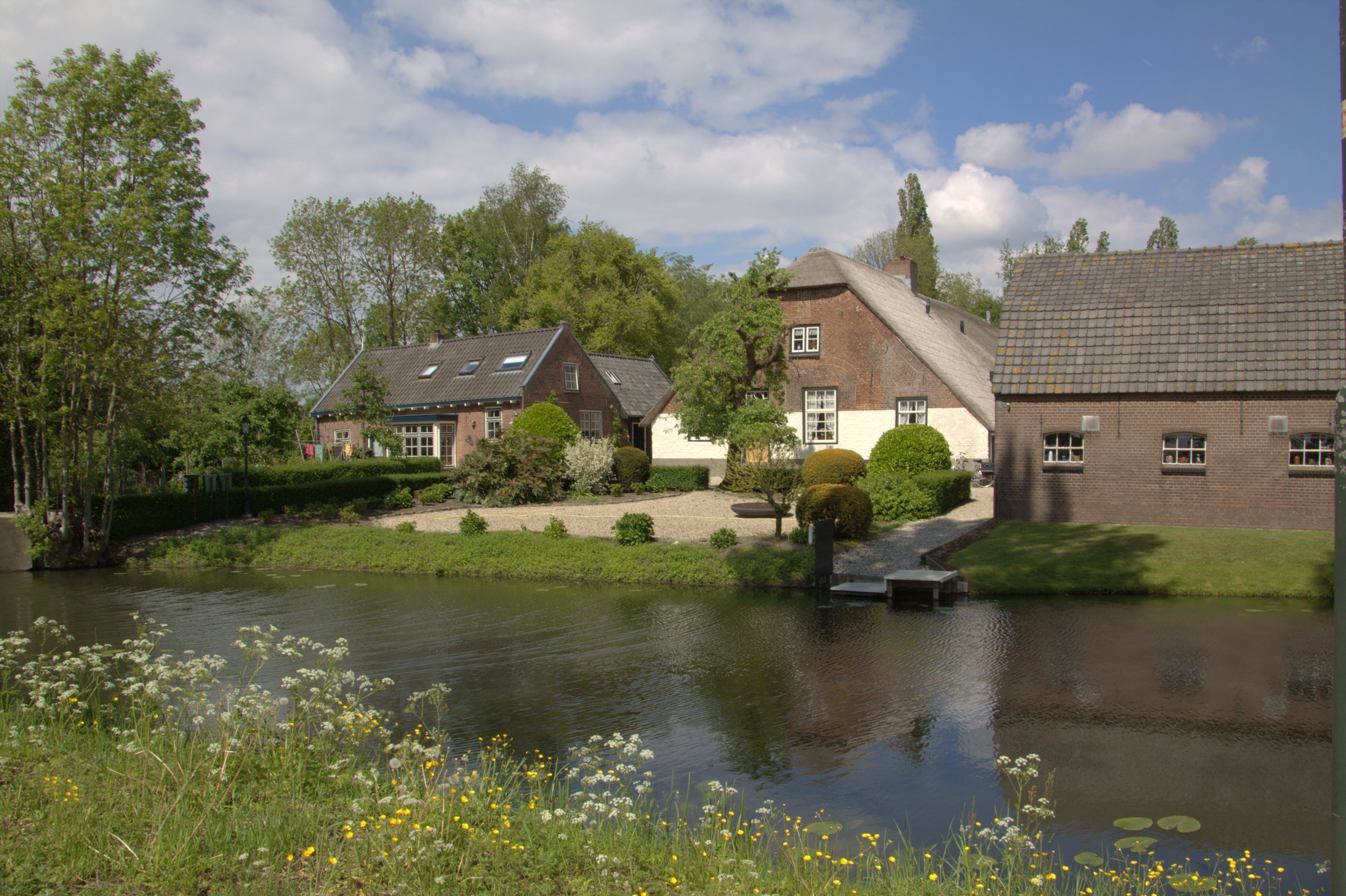
View on Hei- en Boeicop

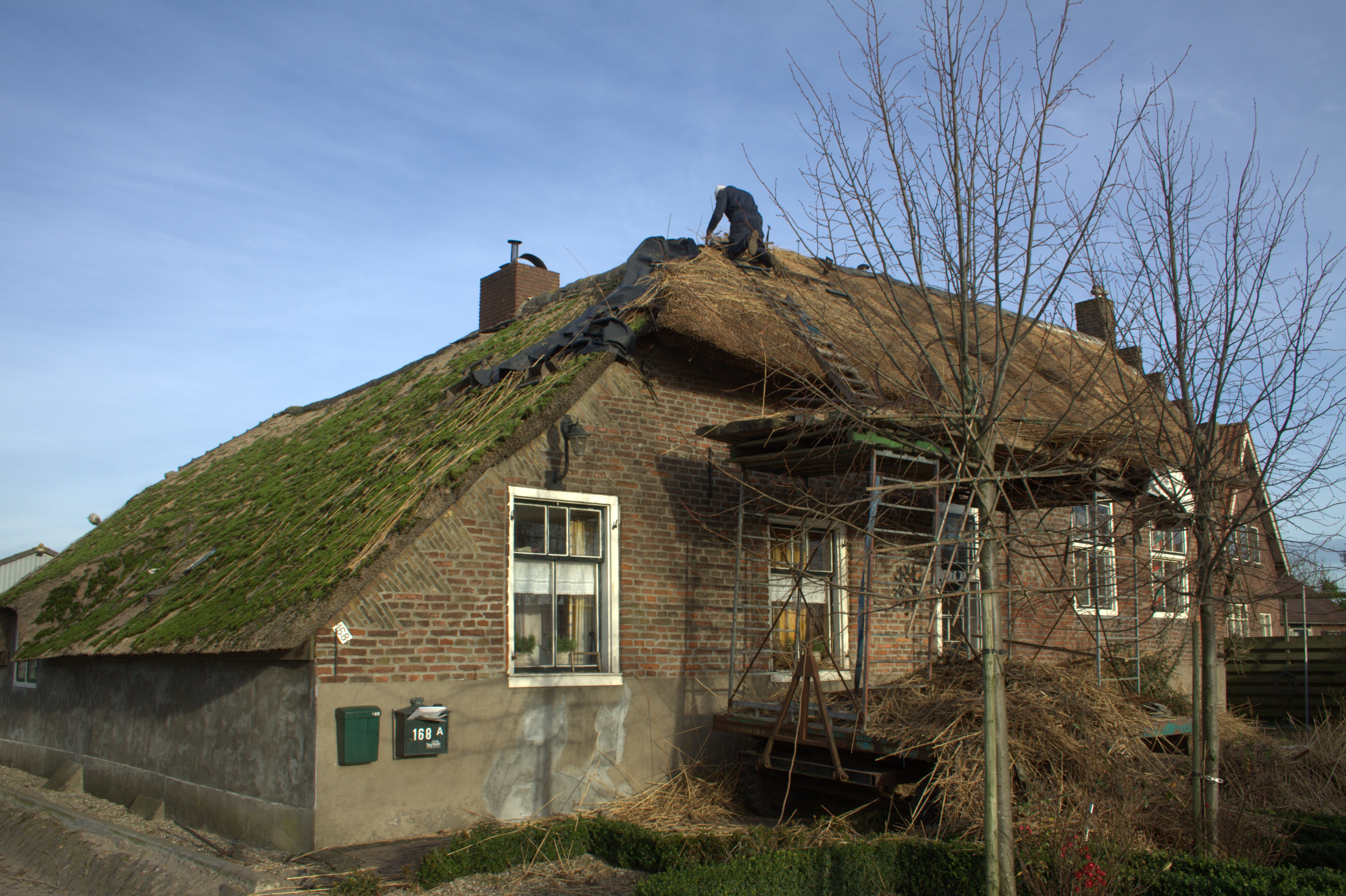
Repairing a roof

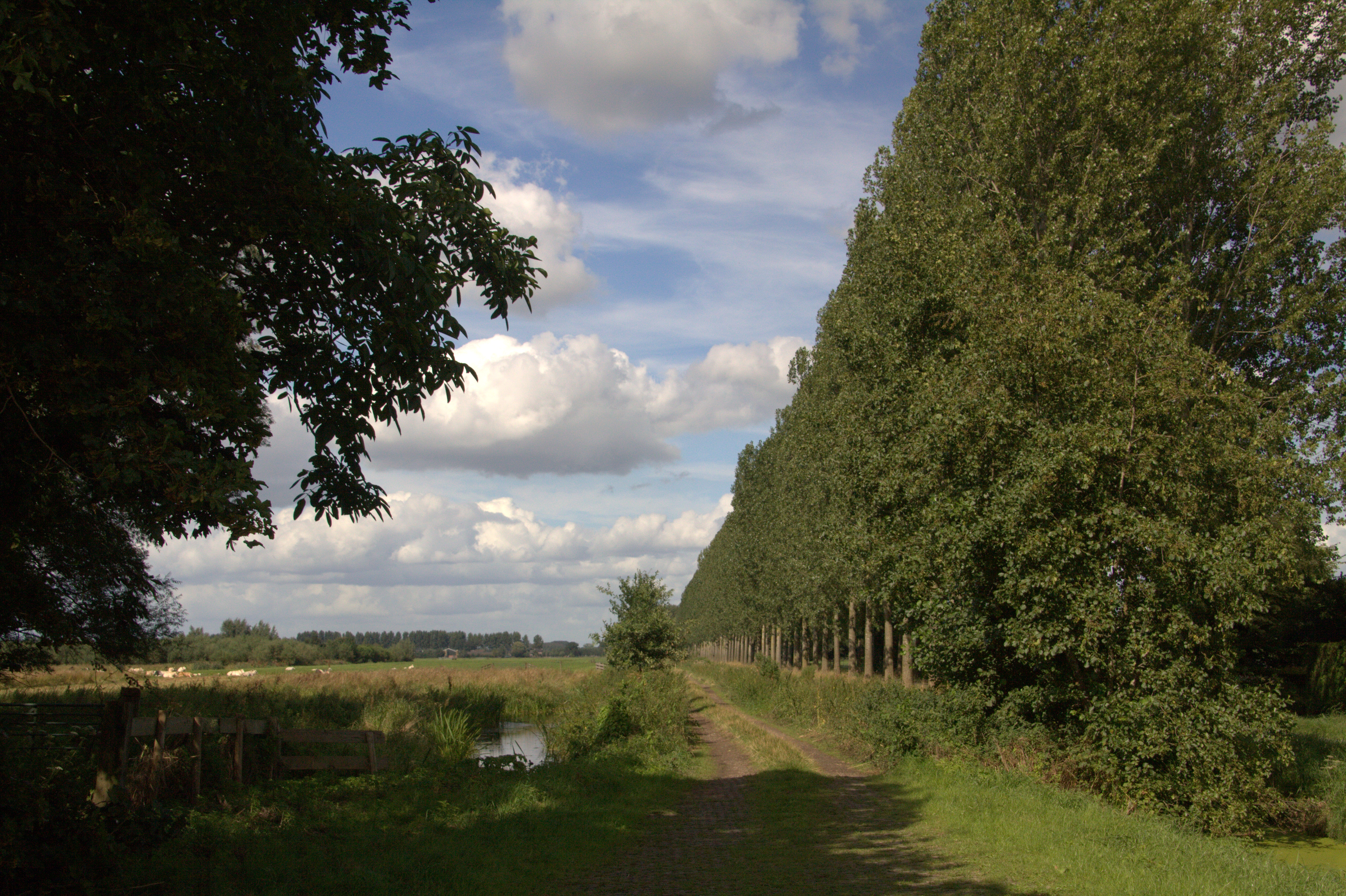
A wall of trees
