= Tienhoven =

Tienhoven is the name of several villages in the Netherlands:

- Tienhoven, Everdingen, in the province of Utrecht
- Tienhoven, Stichtse Vecht, in the province of Utrecht
- Tienhoven, North Holland
- Tienhoven aan de Lek, in the province of Utrecht, formerly a part of South Holland

Van Tienhoven is also a Dutch surname:

- Cornelis van Tienhoven, an important figure in New Amsterdam in the early 17th century
