= Nieuwland, Vijfheerenlanden =

Village in Utrecht, Netherlands

Nieuwland
- Village
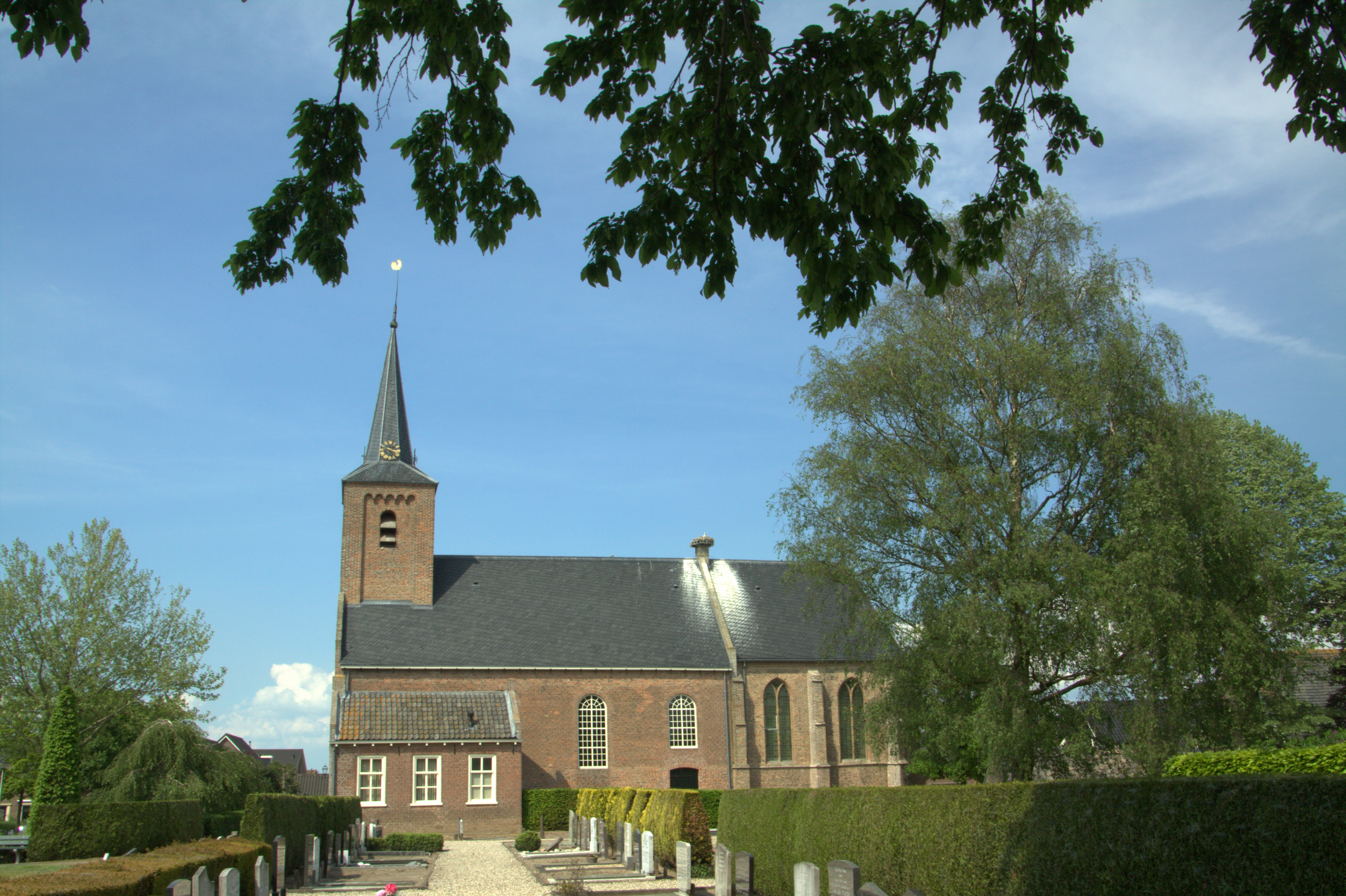
- Protestant Church Nieuwland

- Location in the Netherlands Nieuwland (Netherlands)
- Coordinates: 51.9028°N 5.0133°E
- Country: Netherlands
- Province: Utrecht
- Municipality: Vijfheerenlanden

Area
  - Total: 9.85 km^{2} (3.80 sq mi)
- Elevation: 0.1 m (0.33 ft)

Population (2021)
  - Total: 1,010
  - Density: 103/km^{2} (266/sq mi)
- Time zone: UTC+1 (CET)
  - Summer (DST): UTC+2 (CEST)
- Postal code: 4243
- Dialing code: 0183

Nieuwland is a village in the Dutch province of Utrecht. It is a part of the municipality of Vijfheerenlanden, and lies about 8 km north of Gorinchem.

Nieuwland was a separate municipality in the province of South Holland between 1817 and 1986, when it became part of Zederik. When Zederik merged into the new municipality Vijfheerenlanden in 2019, it became a part of the province of Utrecht.

== History ==
The village was first mentioned in 1320 as Nuwelant, and means new land (polder). Nieuwland was a stretched out cultivation concession. A church was built near the Geer Vliet. The tower of the Protestant Church dates from the 14th century. The church was extensively restored between 1955 and 1957. In 1840, Nieuwland was home to 245 people.

== Gallery ==
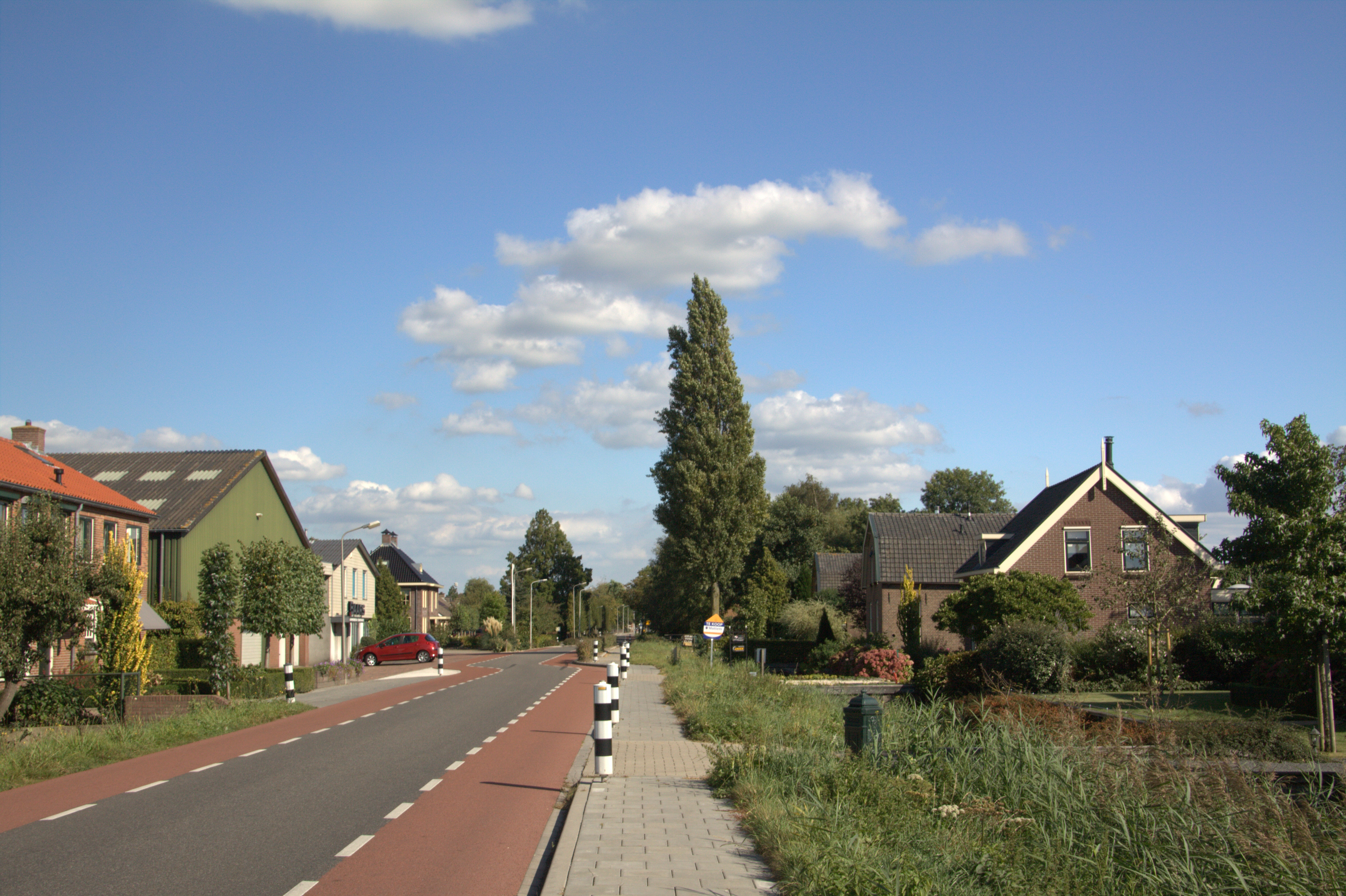
Street view

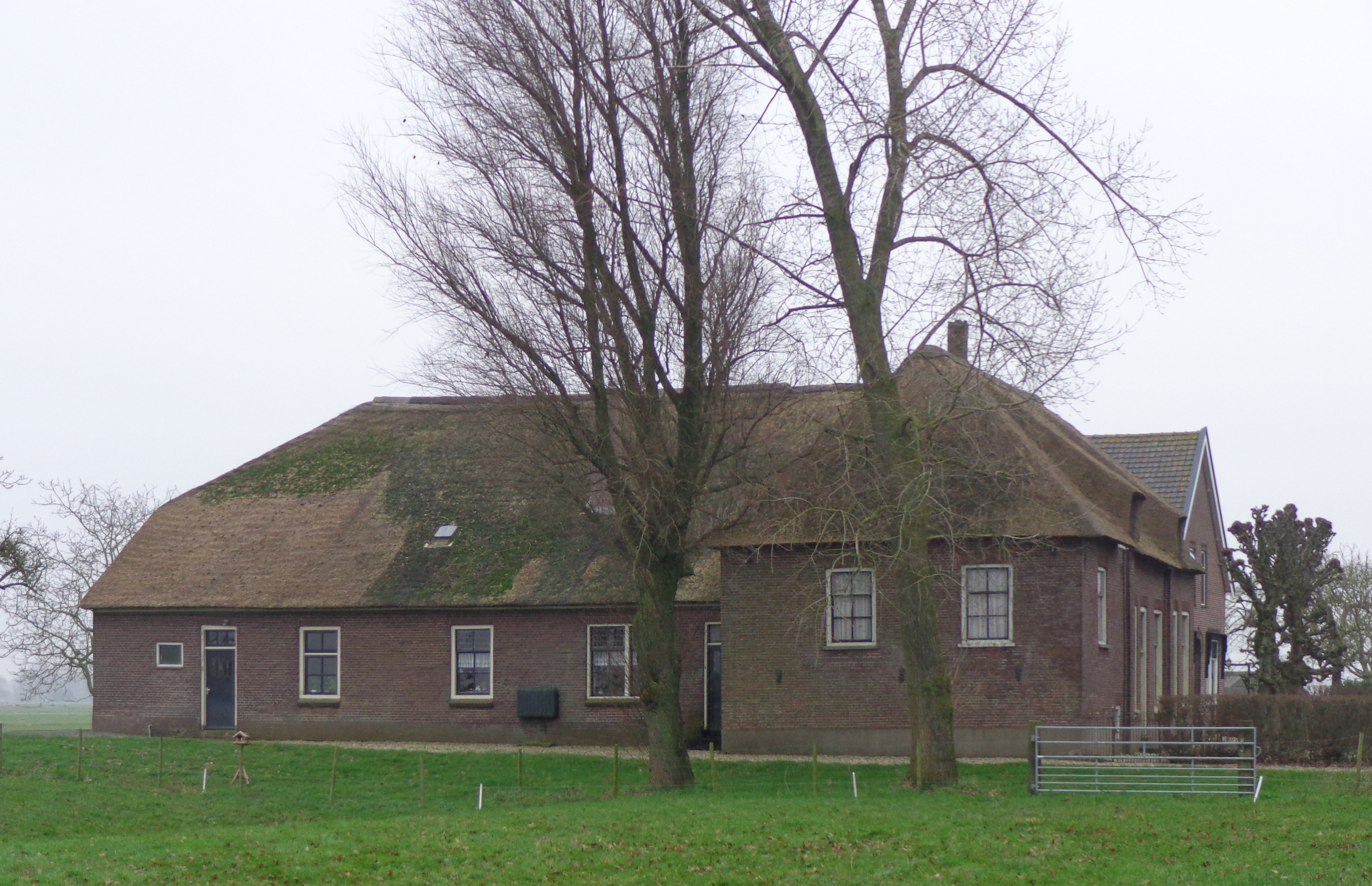
Farm in Nieuwland

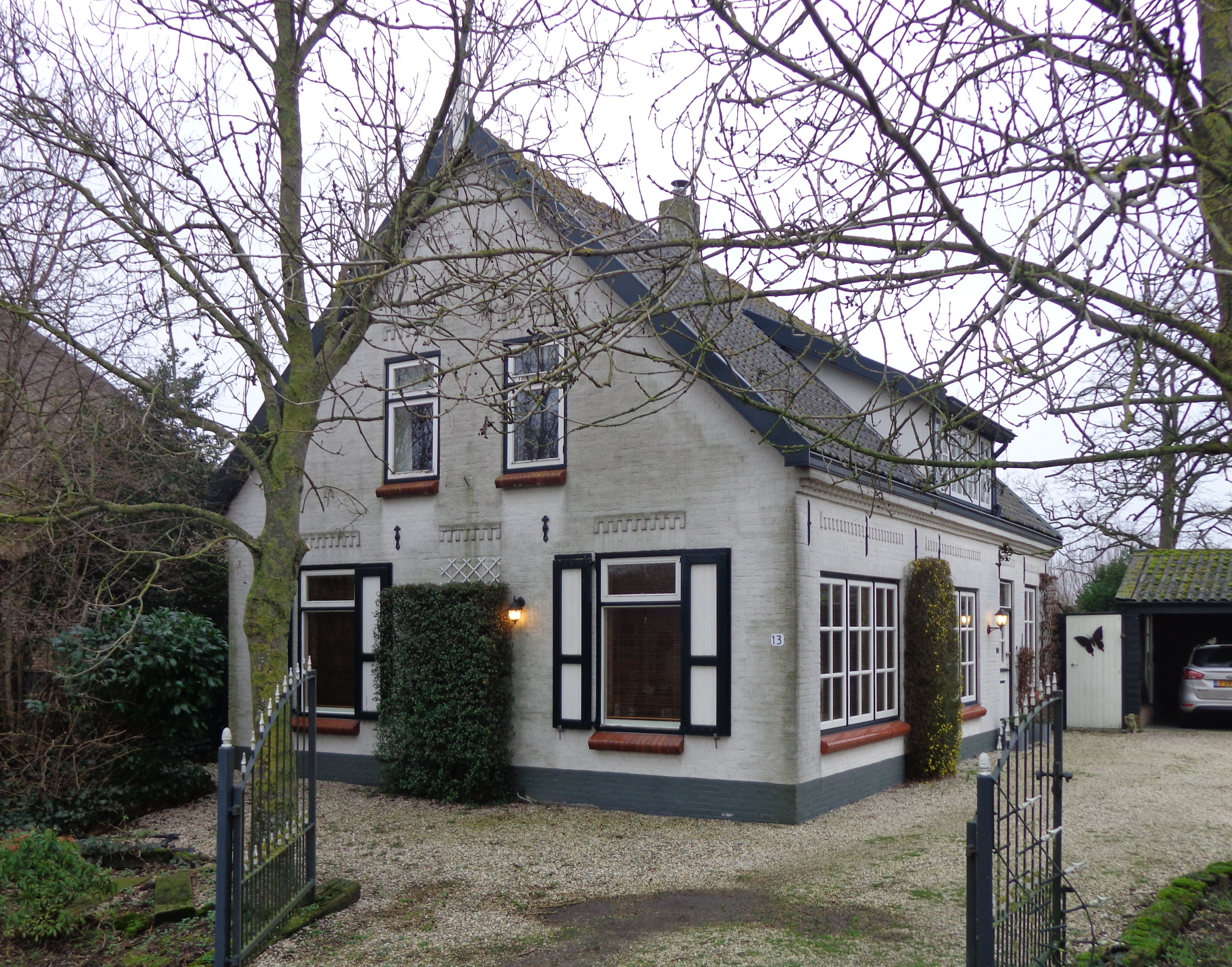
House in Nieuwland

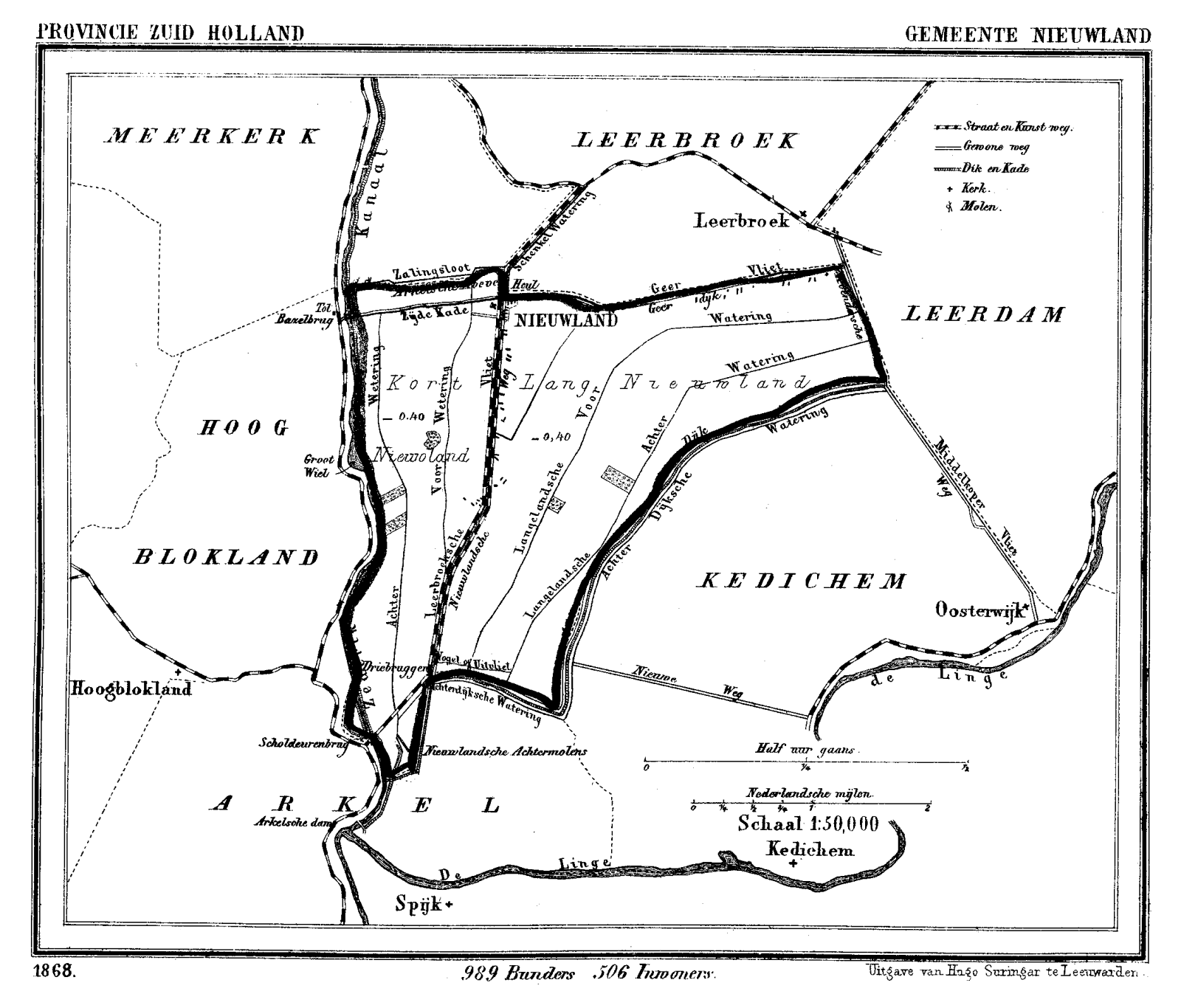
Map of the former municipality in 1868
