= Vianen =

City and former municipality in Utrecht, Netherlands

- City and former municipality
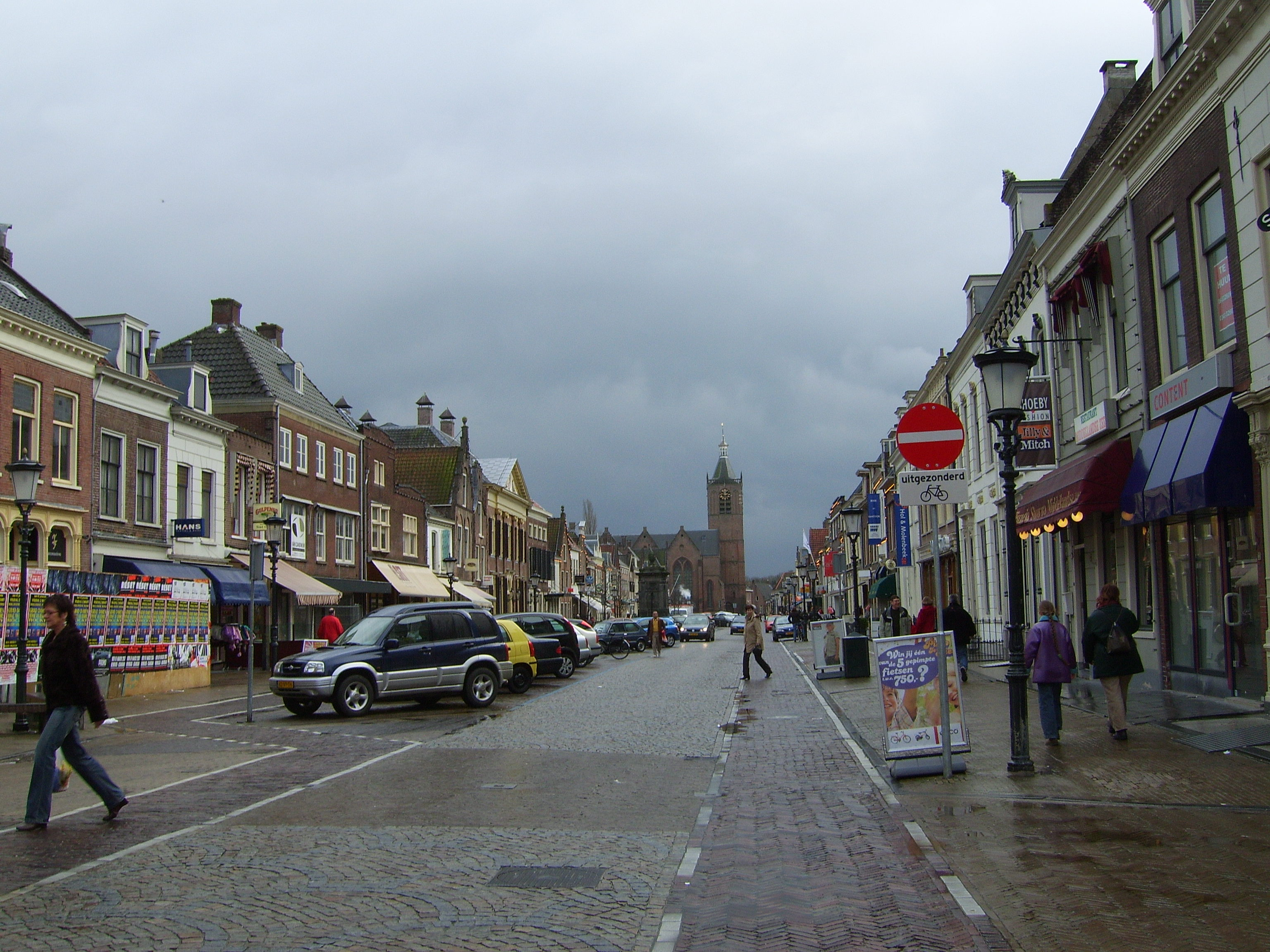
- Vianen town centre

- Flag Coat of arms

- Location of the former municipality in Utrecht
- Coordinates: 52°0′N 5°6′E
- Country: Netherlands
- Province: Utrecht
- Municipality: Vijfheerenlanden
- Merged: 2019

Area
  - Total: 42.39 km^{2} (16.37 sq mi)
  - Land: 39.45 km^{2} (15.23 sq mi)
  - Water: 2.94 km^{2} (1.14 sq mi)

Population (November, 2018)
  - Total: 20,423
- Source: CBS, Statline.
- Time zone: UTC+1 (CET)
  - Summer (DST): UTC+2 (CEST)
- Postcode: 4130–4133
- Area code: 0347
- Website: www.vianen.nl

Vianen (Dutch pronunciation: [viˈjaːnə(n)]) is a city and a former municipality in the central Netherlands, in the province of Utrecht. It is located south of the Lek river. Before 2002 it was part of the province of South Holland. Vianen is made up of a historic town centre that dates back to the medieval period and was once surrounded by a defensive wall (parts of which still stand today) and moat, as well as more extensive modern housing developments to the east, south and southwest and an industrial and commercial area. Vianen is intersected by two major motorways leading to the city of Utrecht: the A2 (Amsterdam-Maastricht) and the A27 (Breda-Almere). The municipality was merged with the municipalities of Leerdam and Zederik on 1 January 2019. The name of the new municipality is Vijfheerenlanden which is part of the Utrecht province.

== The city of Vianen ==
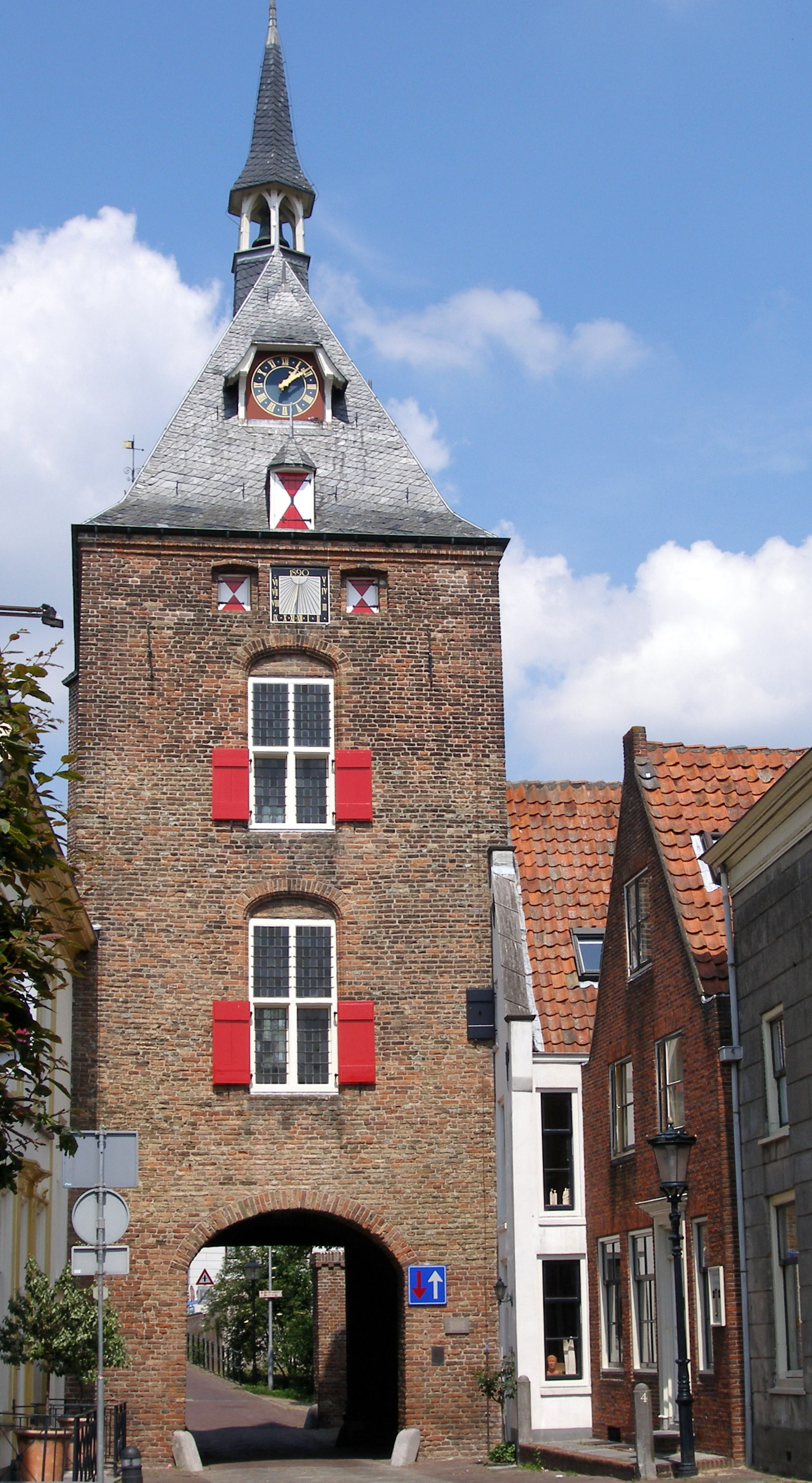
City gate (15th century)

Vianen received city rights in 1337. Vianen thrived under the counts of Brederode, who acquired its lordship through marriage early in the 15th century. It formed a self-proclaimed sovereign seignory till 1795, including Vianen, Lexmond, Hei- en Boeicop and Meerkerk. During the Middle Ages, as a "free city," Vianen could be a haven for felons and escaped serfs. Of the three castles built during the town's history, Batestein Castle was said to be one of the most beautiful in the Netherlands. Its only remnants are a 17th-century brick gate and water-pump. Remnants of the old city wall are visible girdling parts of the old downtown.

Vianen celebrates its city rights every year in October with a traditional horse market. Besides the horses there are also other activities on this day, such as a fair and market and traditional Dutch games.

== Notable residents ==
- Frans van Brederode (1465 - 1490), military leader
- Nicolaas Heinsius the Elder (1620 - 1681), classical scholar and diplomat
- Marie Adrienne Françoise de Noailles, Marquise de La Fayette (1759–1807), married to French General Gilbert du Motier, Marquis de Lafayette. Lived in Vianen in 1799, when her husband was released from imprisonment in Prussia but was not allowed to return to France.
- Marian van de Wal (born 1970), singer
- Jeannette Lewin (born 1972), hockey player
- Ridouan Taghi (born 1977), Moroccan-Dutch criminal, lived in Vianen during his childhood before becoming a leader of the Moroccan mafia.
- Joaquín Martínez (1930 - 2012), Mexican-born film and television actor, lived in Everdingen

== Gallery ==
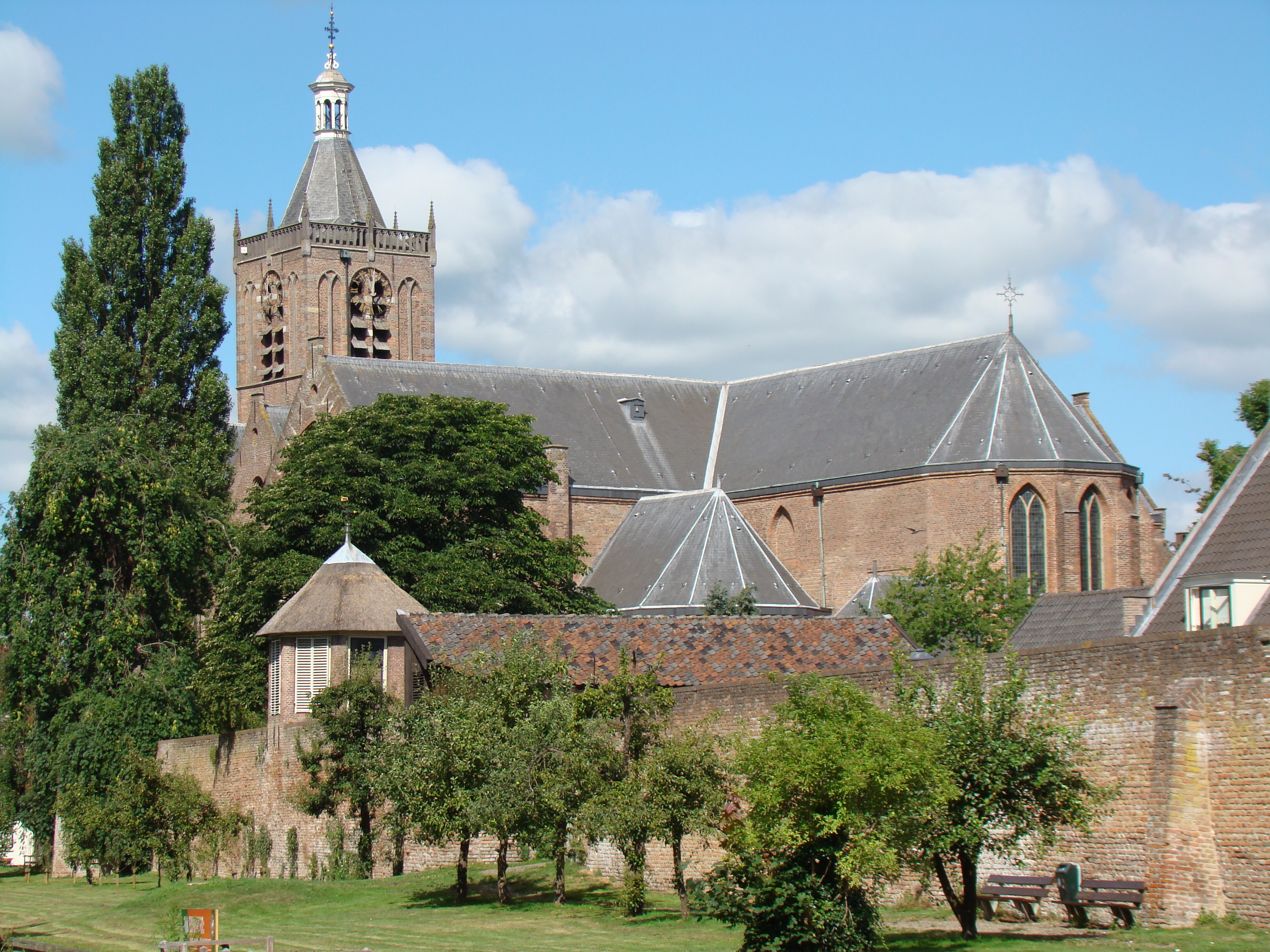

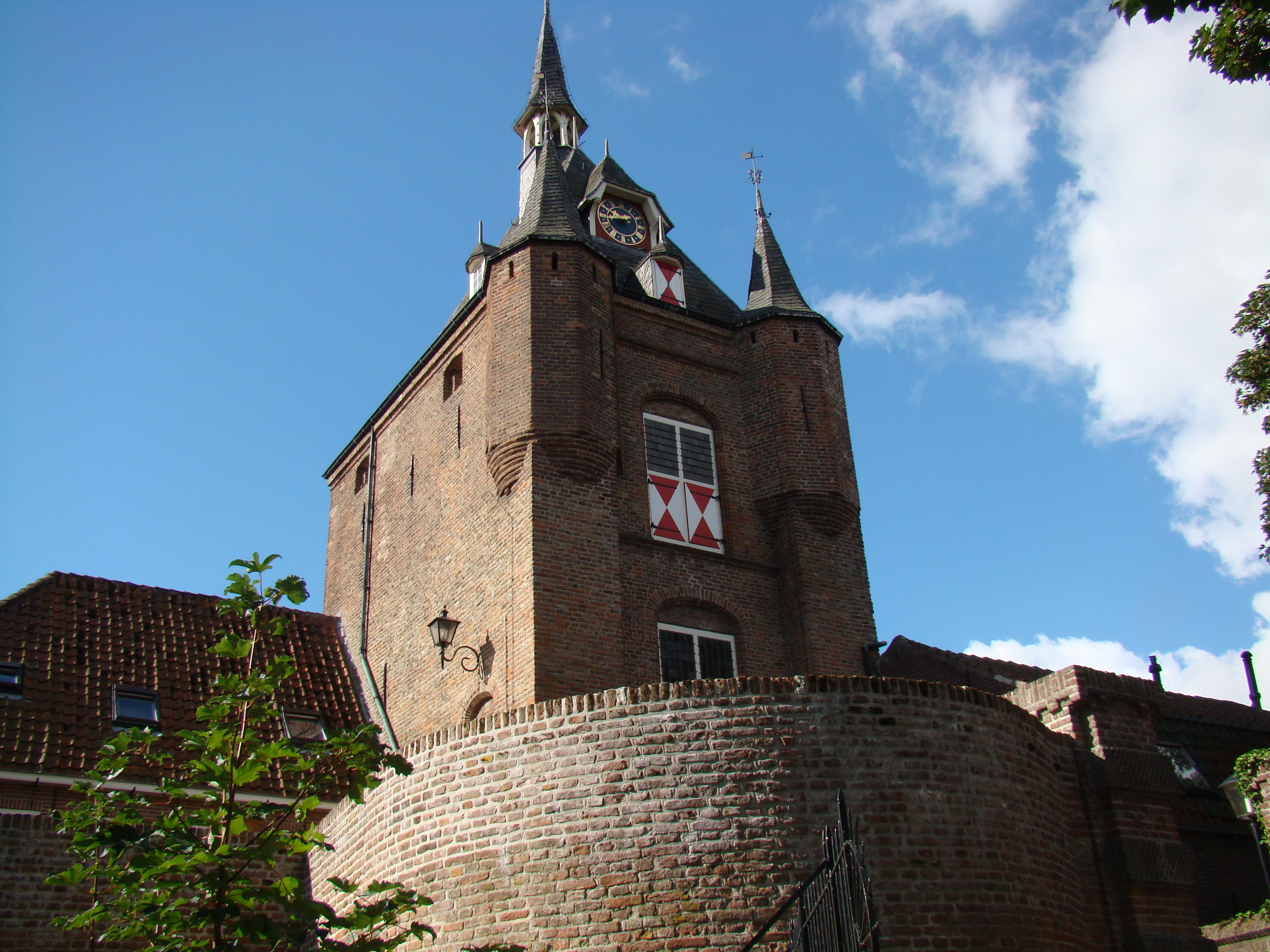

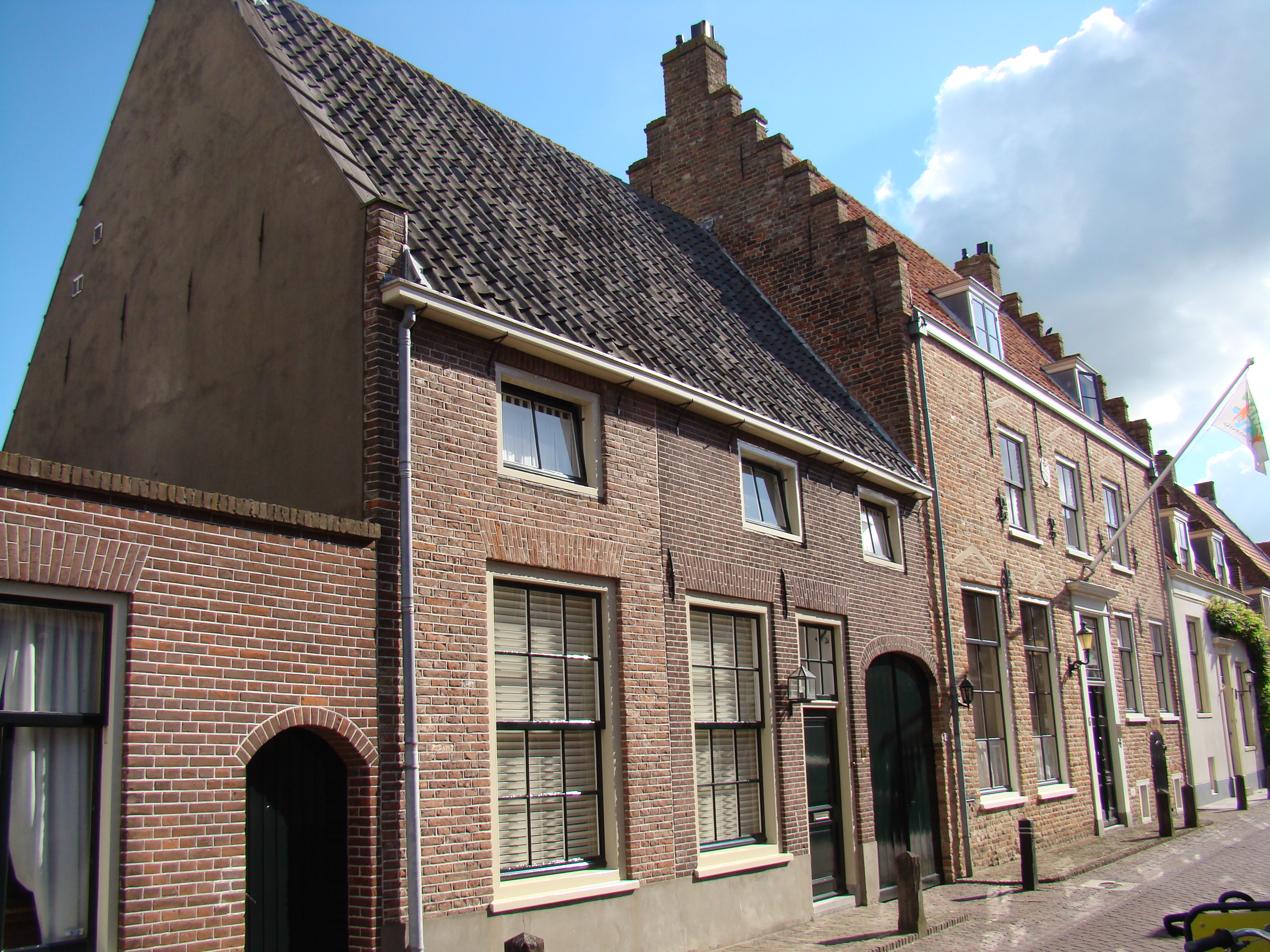

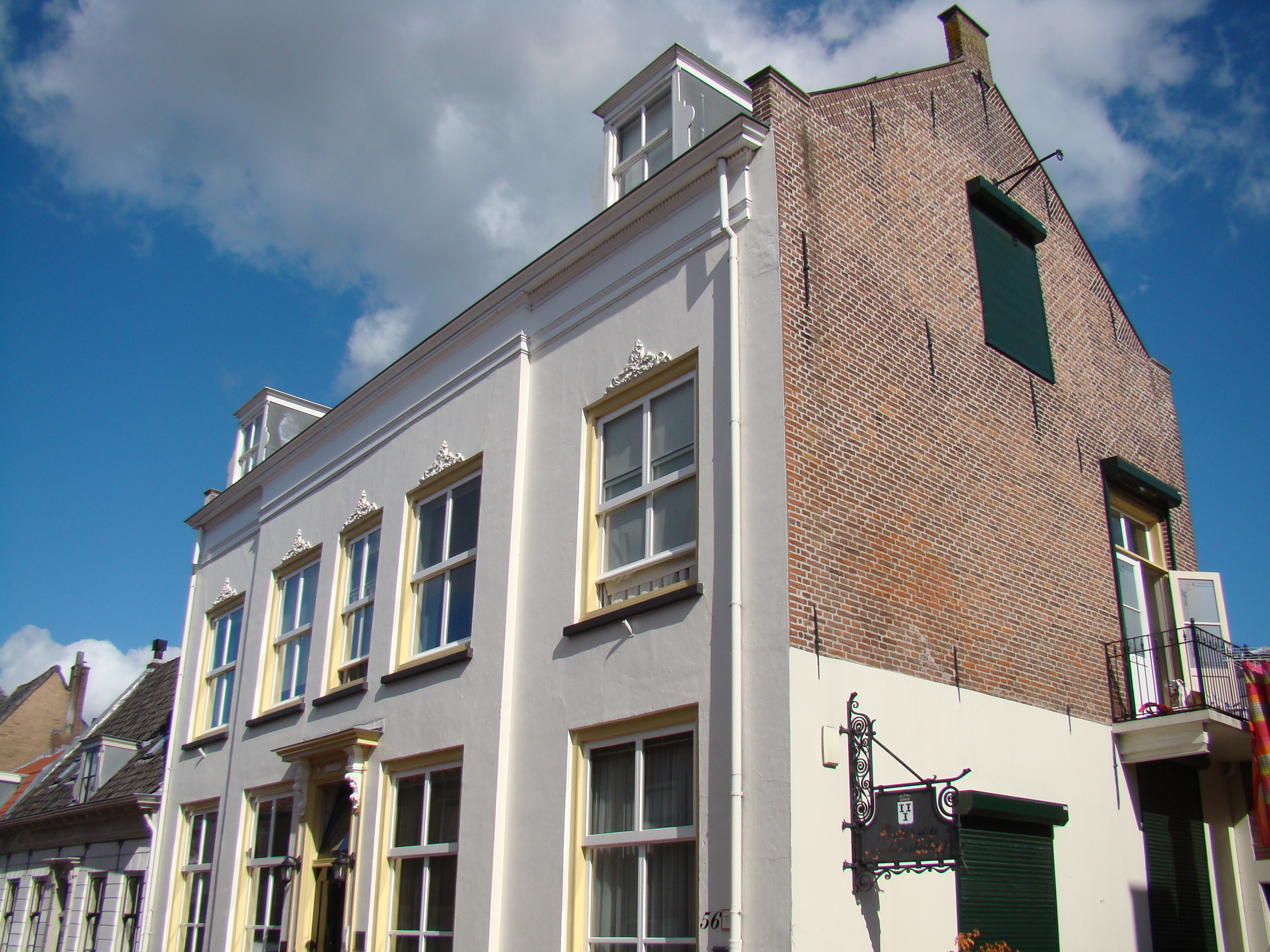
