= Govert Schilling =

Dutch science writer

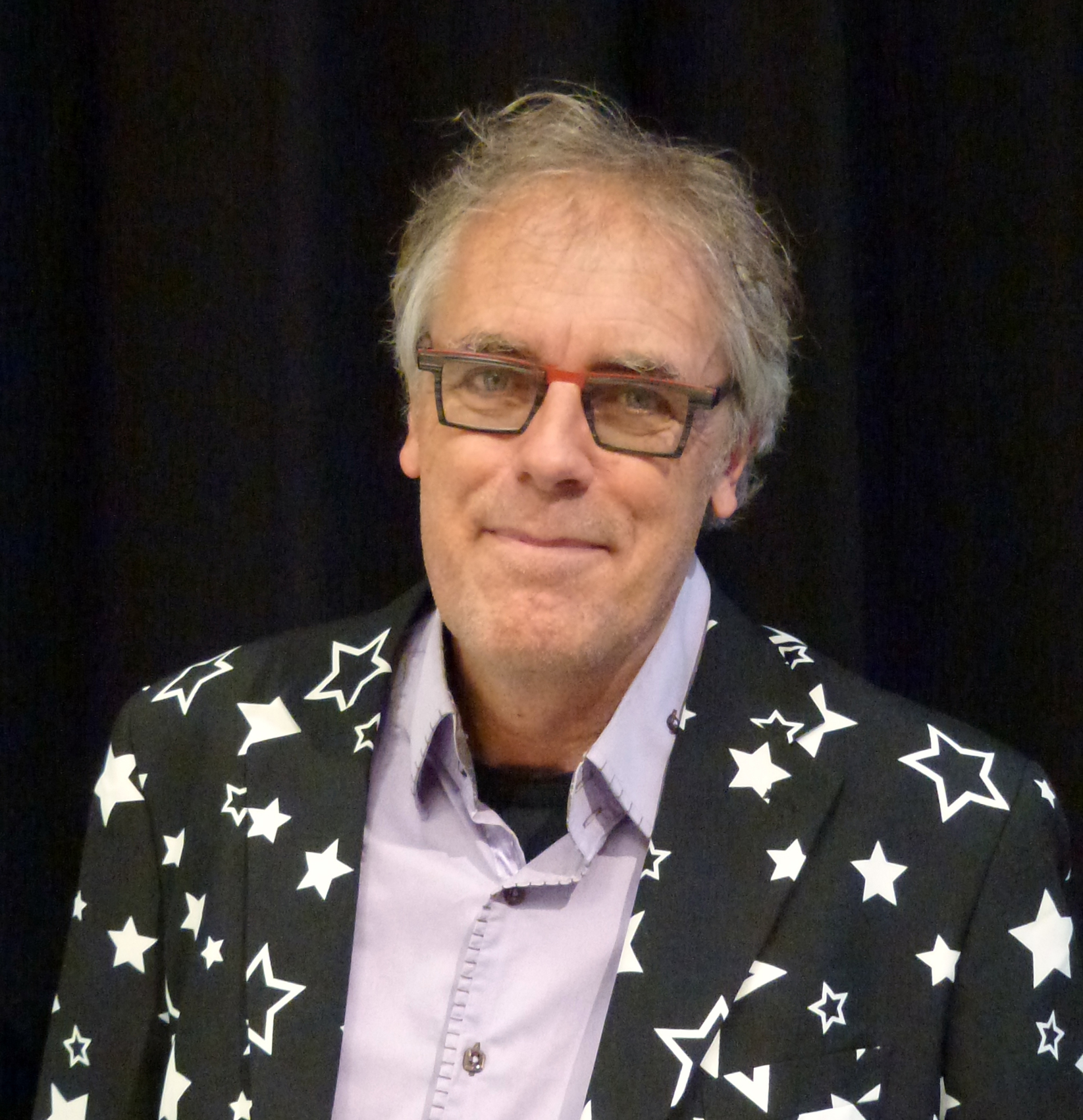
Govert in 2015

Govert Schilling (born 30 November 1956) is a Dutch popular science writer and amateur astronomer.

== Career ==
Schilling was born in Meerkerk. In 1982, he became the program leader at the former Zeiss Planetarium, Amsterdam.

From 1987 to 1998 he was also a part-time appointee as a program leader at the Artis Planetarium in Amsterdam.

He has extensively written for the Sky & Telescope magazine and the journal Science.

== Honours ==
The asteroid 10986 Govert is named after him.

== Bibliography ==
He is the author of a number of bestselling books.

He has frequently collaborated with Lars Lindberg Christensen.

- Europe to the Stars: ESO's first 50 years of exploring the southern sky
- Atlas of Astronomical Discoveries
- Evolving Cosmos
- Eyes on the Skies: 400 Years of Telescopic Discovery
- The Hunt for Planet X: New Worlds and the Fate of Pluto ISBN 978-0-387-77804-4
- Flash!: The Hunt for the Biggest Explosions in the Universe
- Ripples in Spacetime: Einstein, Gravitational Waves and the Future of Astronomy
- Target Earth: Meteorites, Asteroids, Comets, and Other Cosmic Intruders That Threaten Our Planet (2025)
