= Tienhoven aan de Lek =

- Village
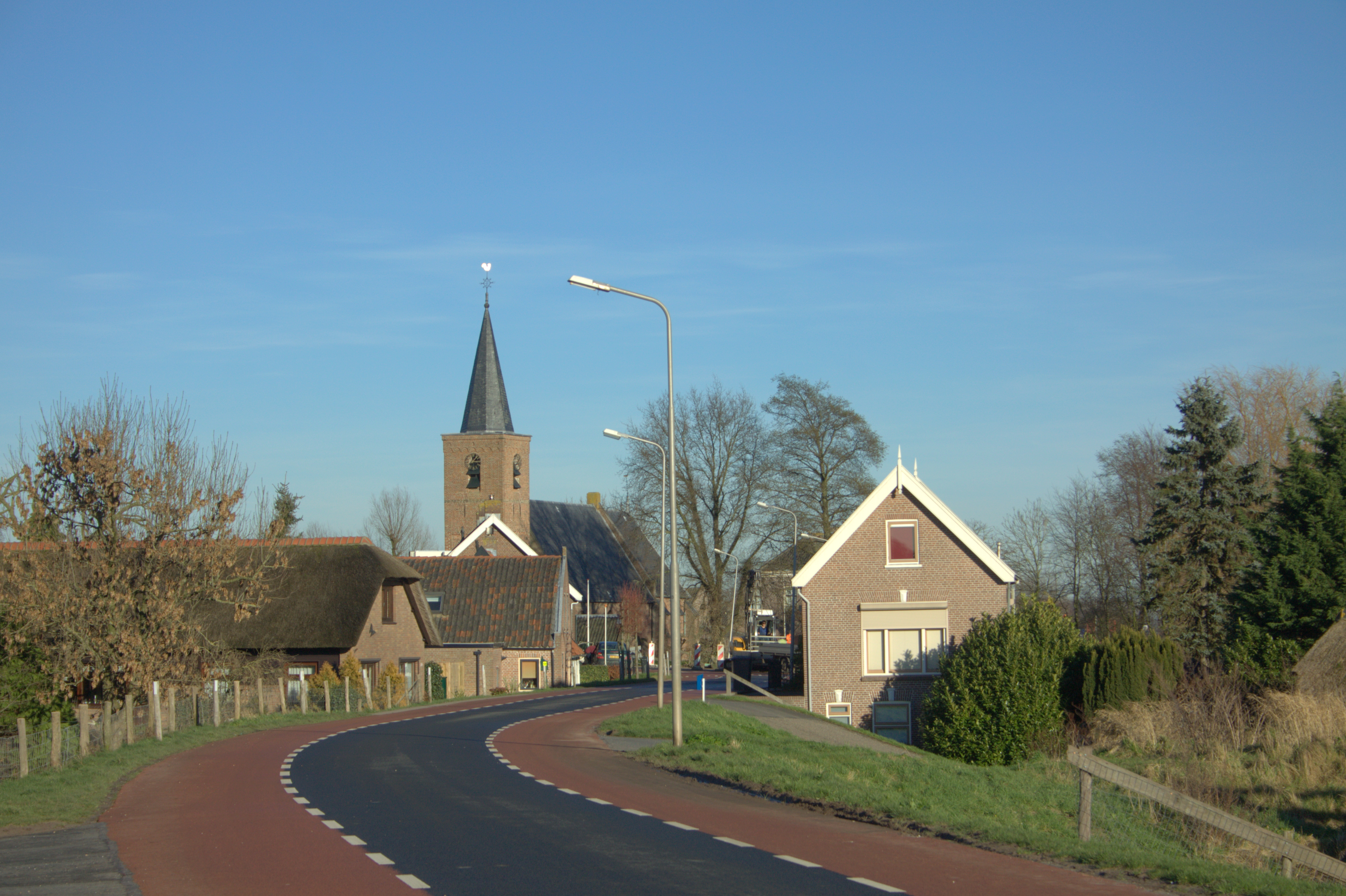
- View on Tienhoven aan de Lek

- Location in the Netherlands Tienhoven aan de Lek (Netherlands)
- Coordinates: 51°58′N 4°56′E
- Country: Netherlands
- Province: Utrecht
- Municipality: Vijfheerenlanden

Area
  - Total: 4.35 km^{2} (1.68 sq mi)
- Elevation: 2 m (6.6 ft)

Population (2021)
  - Total: 805
  - Density: 185/km^{2} (479/sq mi)
- Time zone: UTC+1 (CET)
  - Summer (DST): UTC+2 (CEST)
- Postal code: 4235
- Dialing code: 0183

Tienhoven is a village in the Dutch province of Utrecht. It is a part of the municipality of Vijfheerenlanden, and lies about 10 km southwest of IJsselstein.

Tienhoven was a separate municipality in the province of South Holland between 1817 and 1986, when it became part of Zederik. When Zederik merged into the new municipality Vijfheerenlanden in 2019, it became a part of the province of Utrecht. The name of the town has changed to Tienhoven aan de Lek to distinguish it from Tienhoven, Stichtse Vecht, in the province of Utrecht.

The village was first mentioned in 1253 as Thienhoeuen, and means "ten parcels of land". In 2019, the name was officially changed to Tienhoven aan de Lek to distinguish from the other Tienhovens. The Protestant church dates from the 12th century, and was enlarged in the 14th and 15th century. The tower dates from the 15th century. In 1840, it was home to 238 people.

== Gallery ==
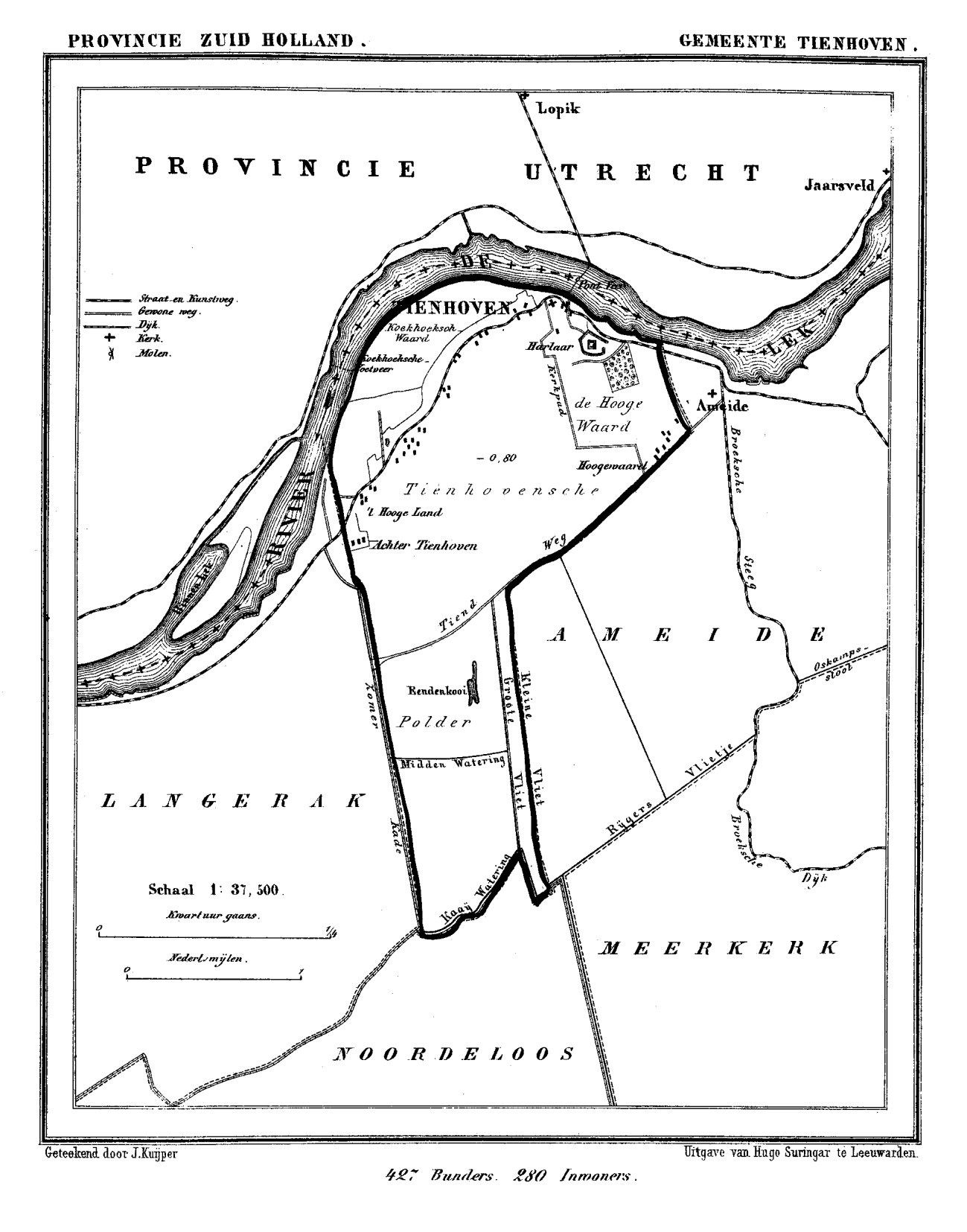
Tienhoven in 1866.

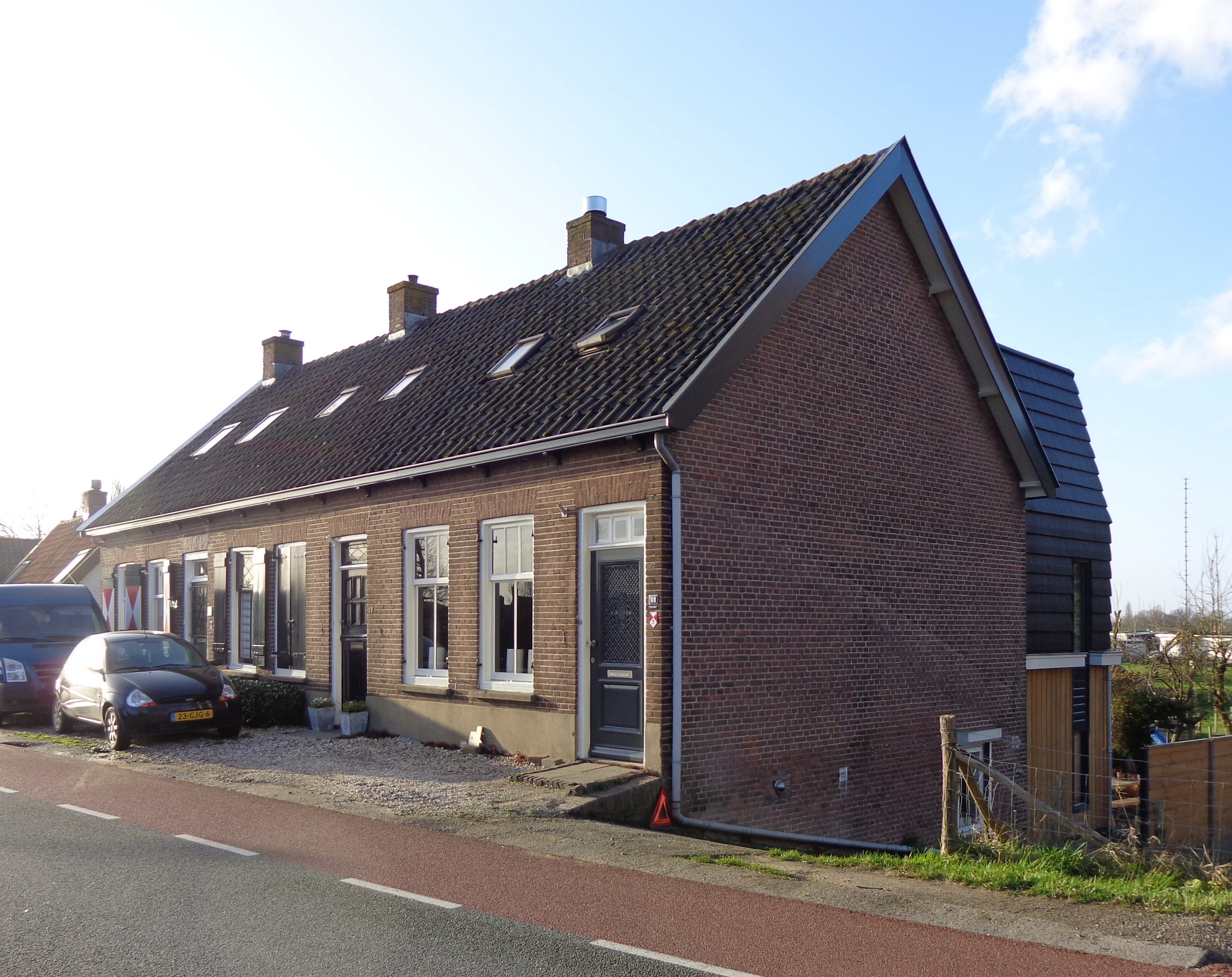
Dike houses

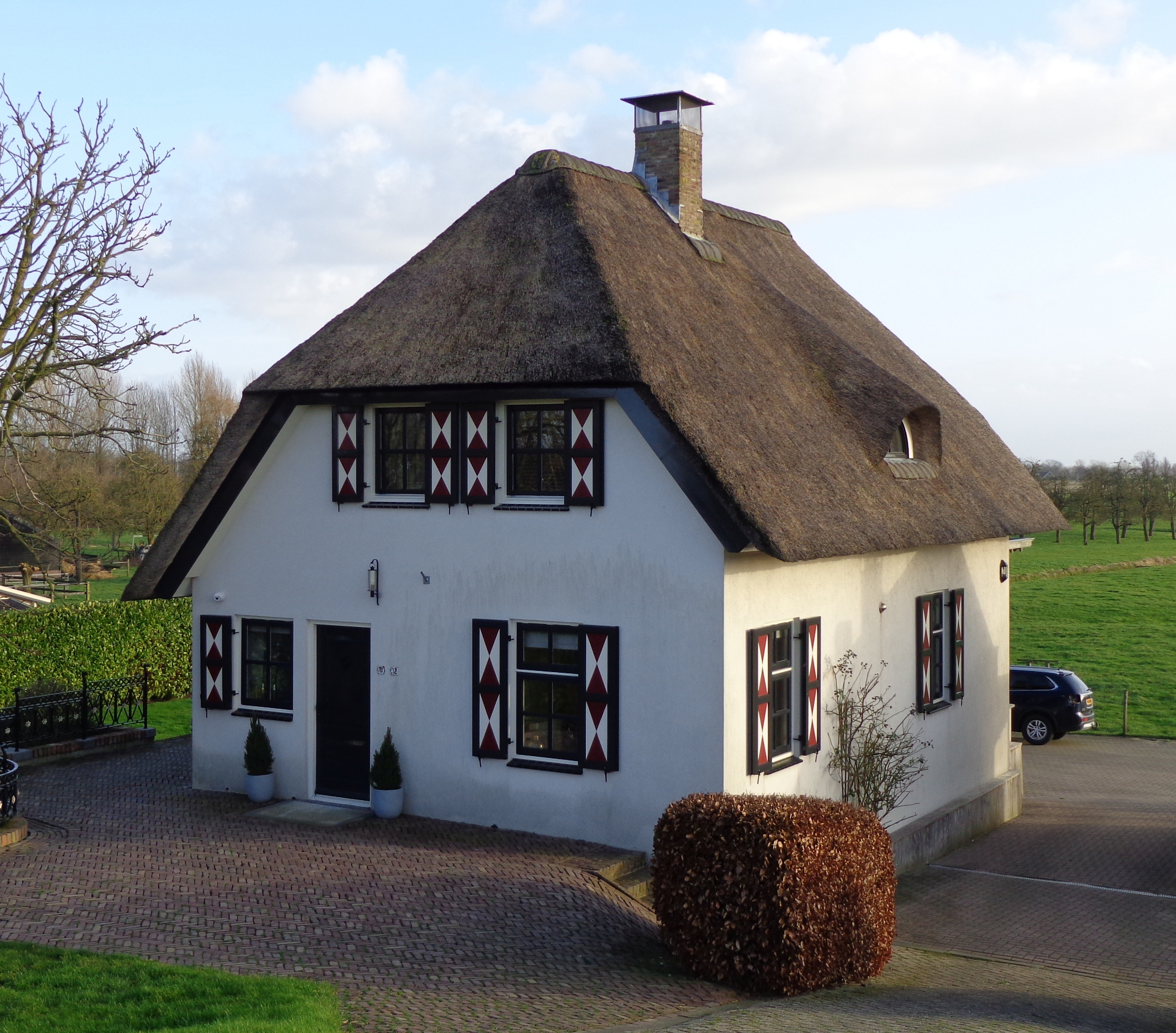

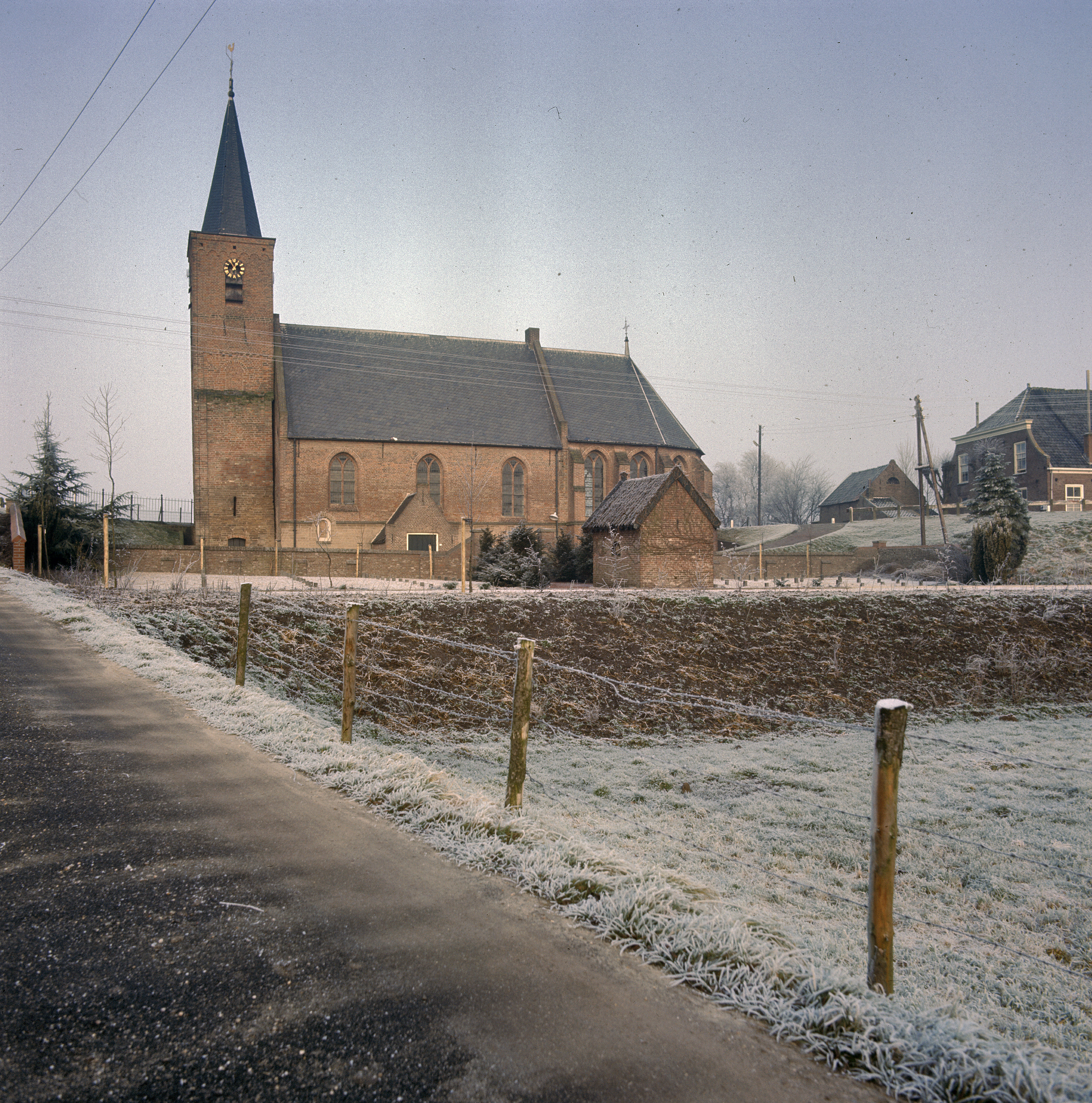
Church
