= Meerkerk =

- Village
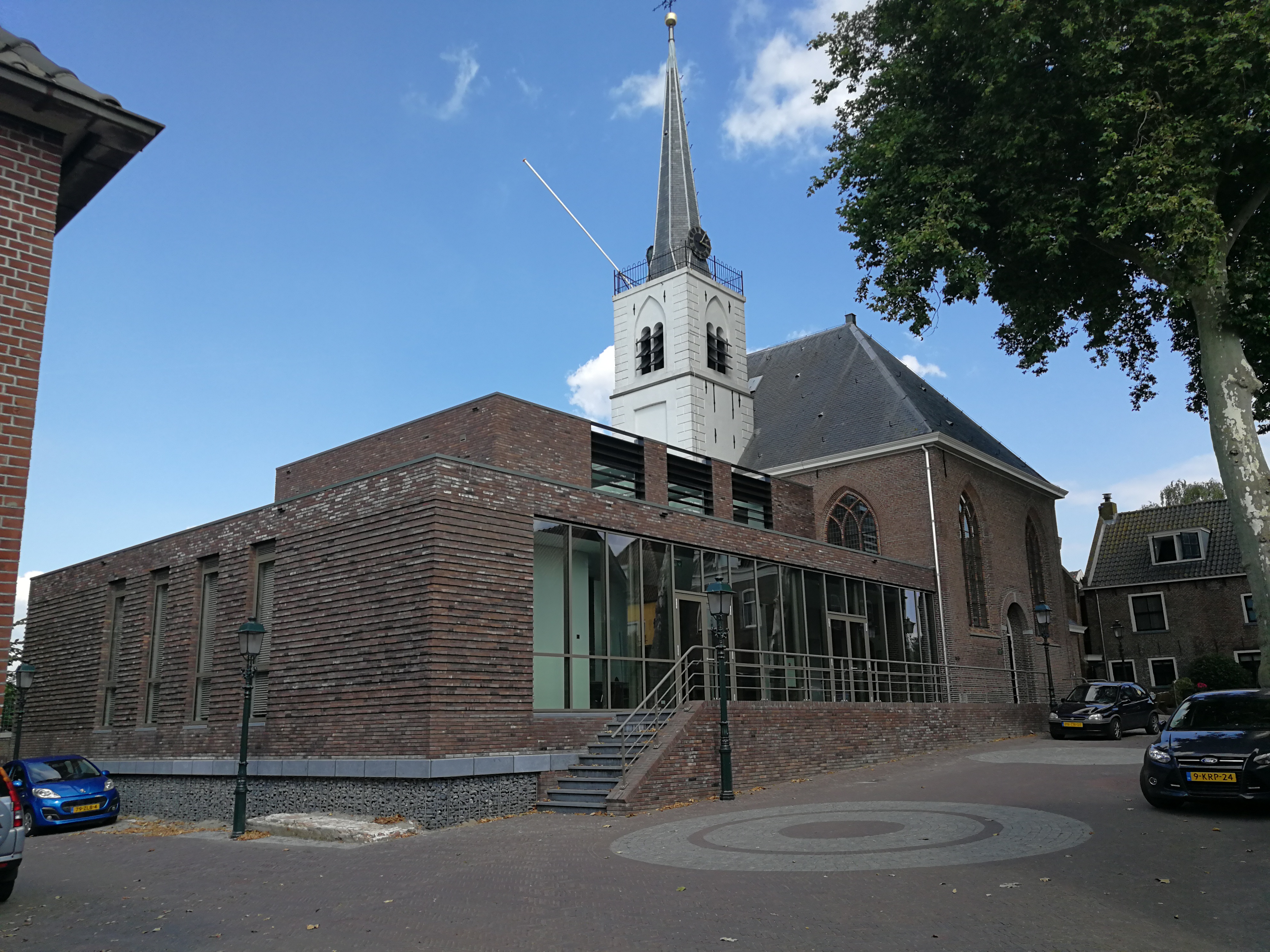
- Protestant Church with extension

- Location in the Netherlands Meerkerk (Netherlands)
- Country: Netherlands
- Province: Utrecht
- Municipality: Vijfheerenlanden

Area
  - Total: 15.27 km^{2} (5.90 sq mi)
- Elevation: −0.5 m (−1.6 ft)

Population (2021)
  - Total: 3,860
  - Density: 253/km^{2} (655/sq mi)
- Time zone: UTC+1 (CET)
  - Summer (DST): UTC+2 (CEST)
- Postal code: 4231
- Dialing code: 0183

Meerkerk is a village in the Dutch province of Utrecht. It is a part of the municipality of Vijfheerenlanden, and lies about 9 km north of Gorinchem.

In 2001, the village of Meerkerk had 2281 inhabitants. The built-up area of the village was 0.71 km², and contained 818 residences. The statistical area "Meerkerk", which also can include the surrounding countryside, has a population of around 2310.

== History ==
Not much is known of Meerkerk's early history. According to municipal sources, the town was first mentioned in a clerical document, written in 1266 or 1267AD. The origins of the name 'Meerkerk' (Literally translated: 'Lakechurch') are unclear, though it is probable it derived from 'De Kerk bij het Meer', meaning 'The Church by the Lake', referring to several small strips of land called 'Het Meer' (The Lake).

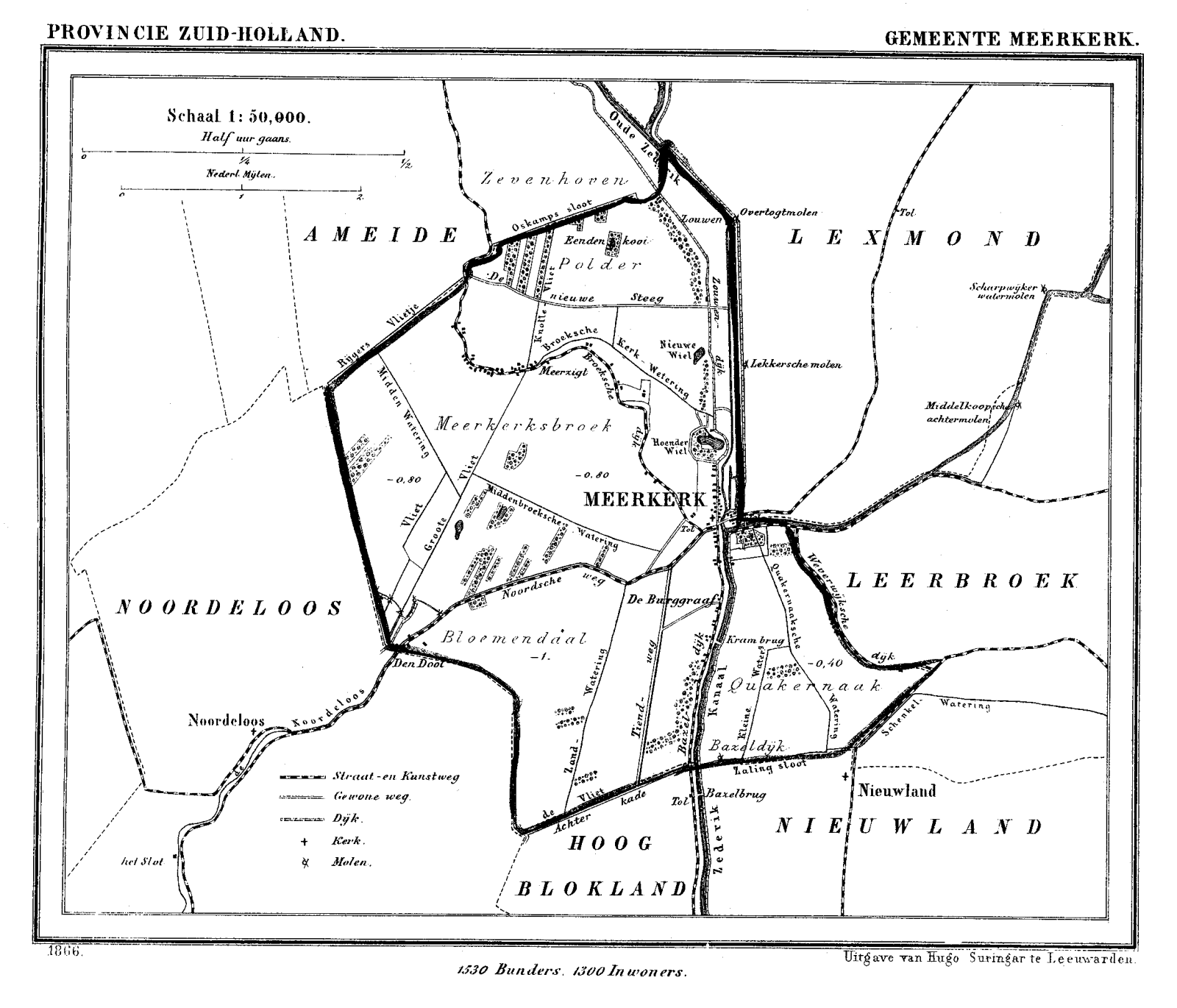
Meerkerk in 1866.

In the early centuries of its existence the village played an important role in regional traffic, due to its favourable location by the river Viaanse Vaart. During the French occupation of the Netherlands in the early 19th century Napoleon Bonaparte ordered the construction of a major road connection between Paris and Amsterdam, passing through Meerkerk as well. According to local legend, the emperor himself once spent some time in Meerkerk during an official visit to the Netherlands. The main road was made by the army of Napoleon, and it was the first road of stone in the region.

Meerkerk was a separate municipality in the province of South Holland until 1986, when it became part of Zederik. When Zederik merged into the new municipality Vijfheerenlanden in 2019, it became a part of the province of Utrecht.

Since 1886 the Zederik Channel passes the town, maintaining Meerkerk's importance to regional traffic. By the end World War II the municipality expanded its borders, giving the population a chance to increase to some 2500 souls.

== Gallery ==
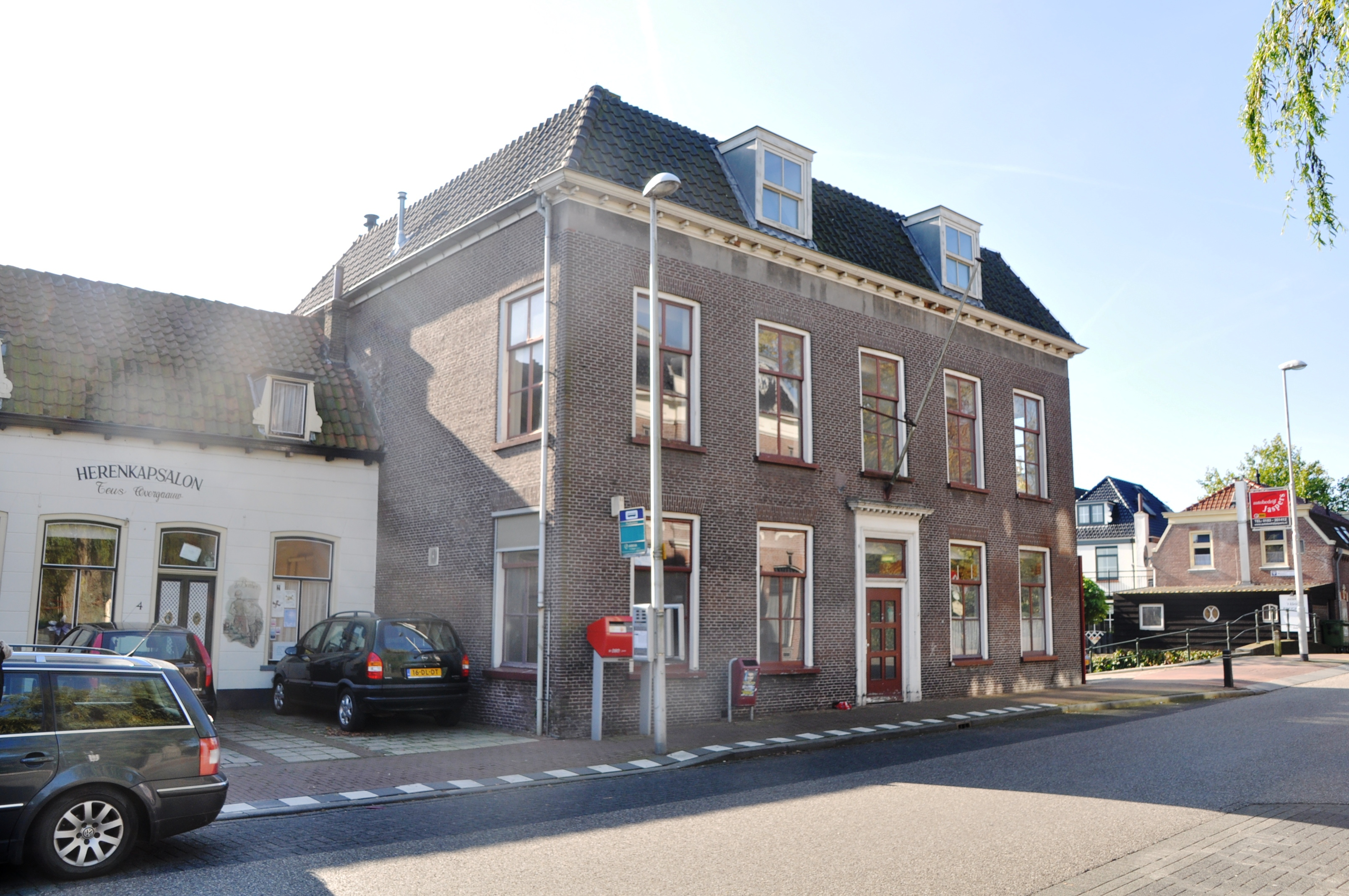
Former post office

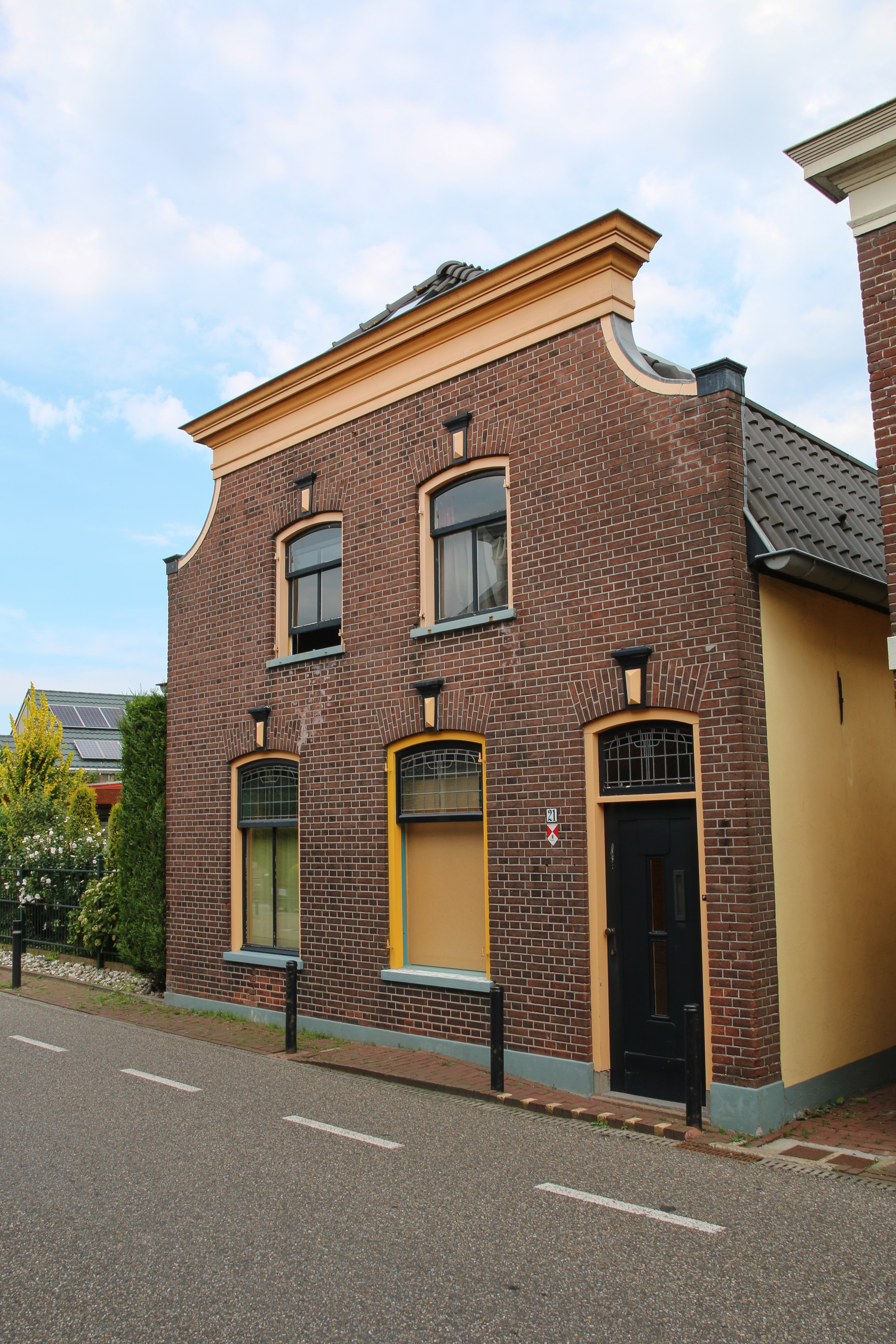
House in Meerkerk

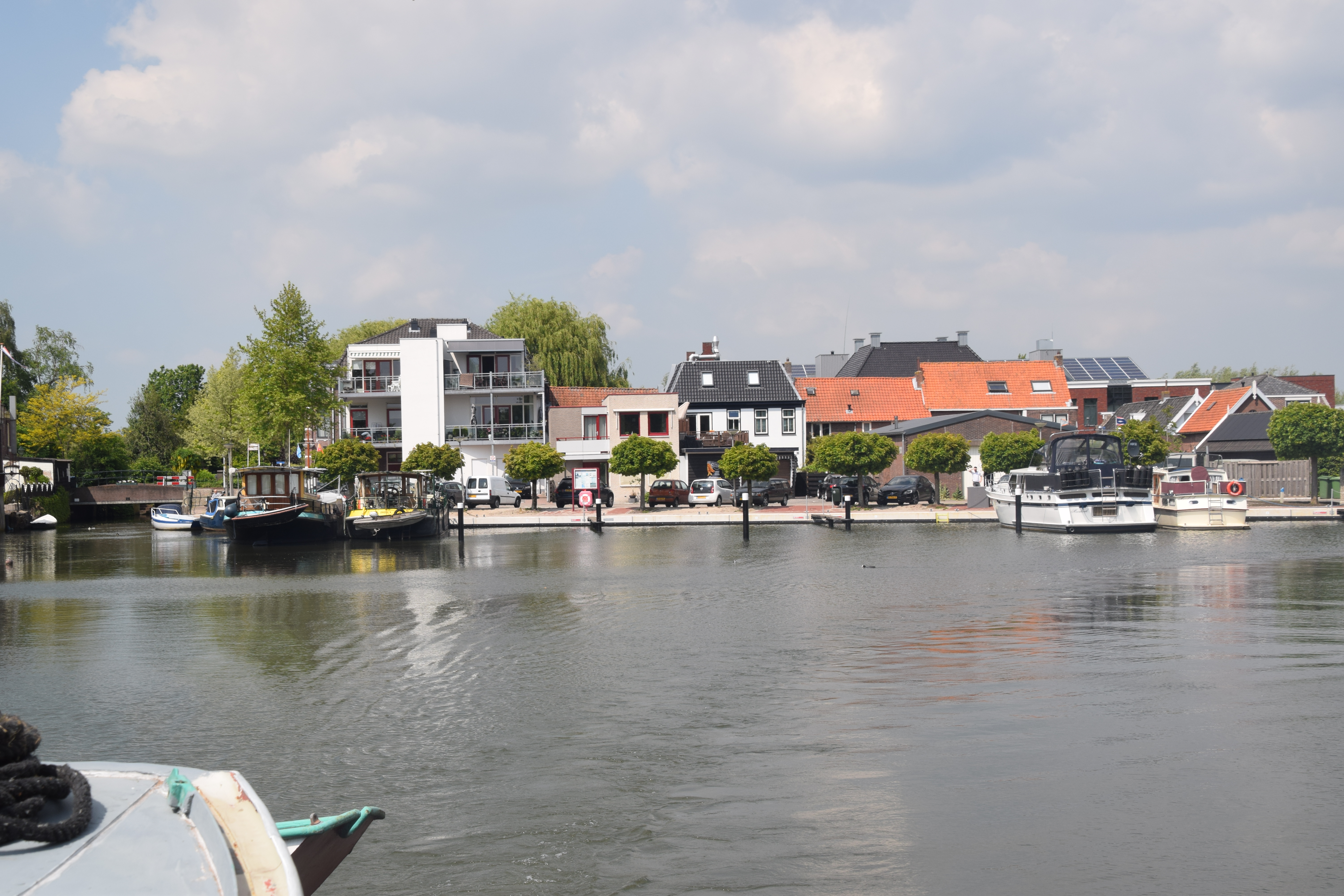
Harbour

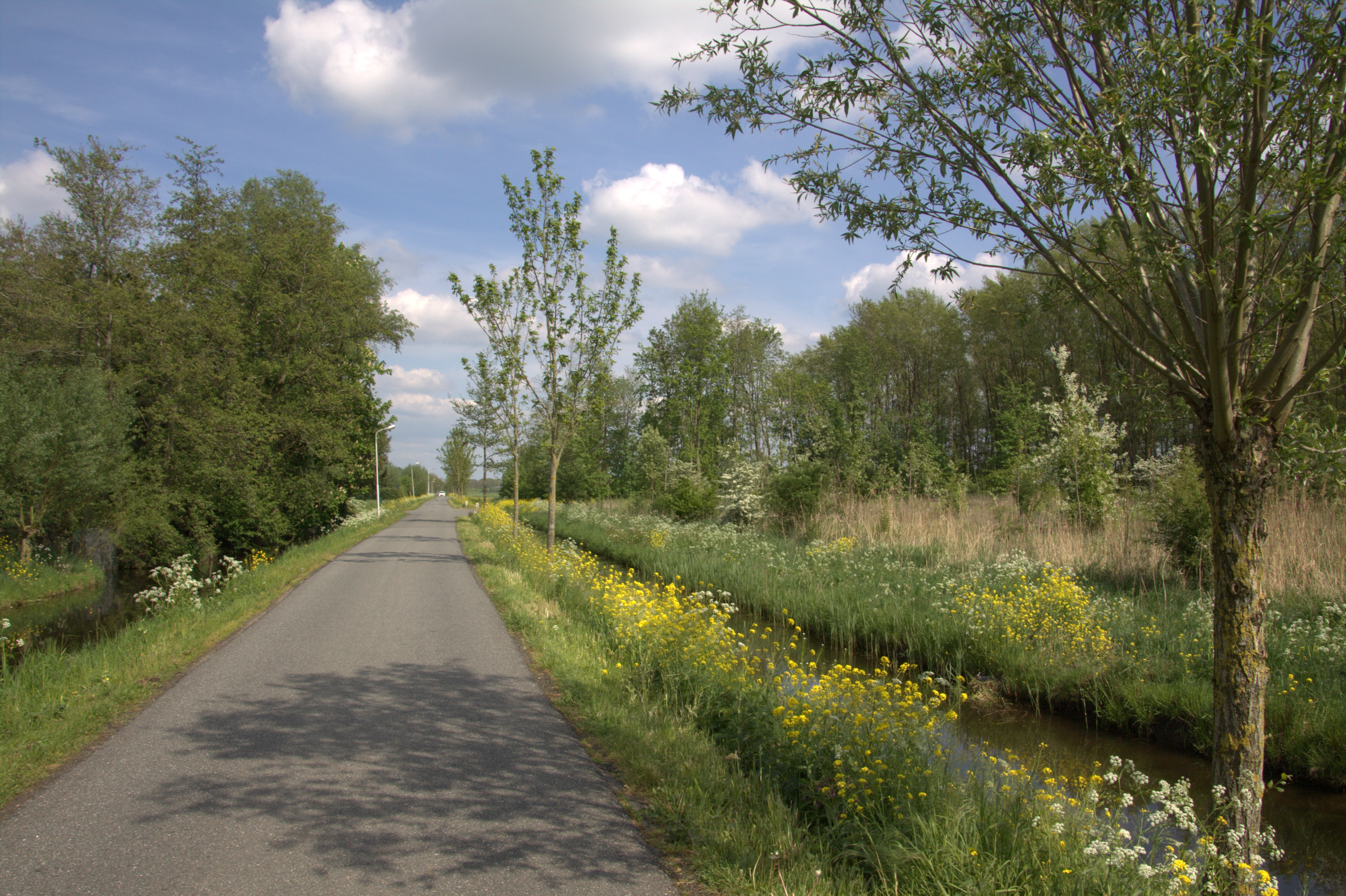
Country road
