= Vijfheerenlanden =

- Municipality
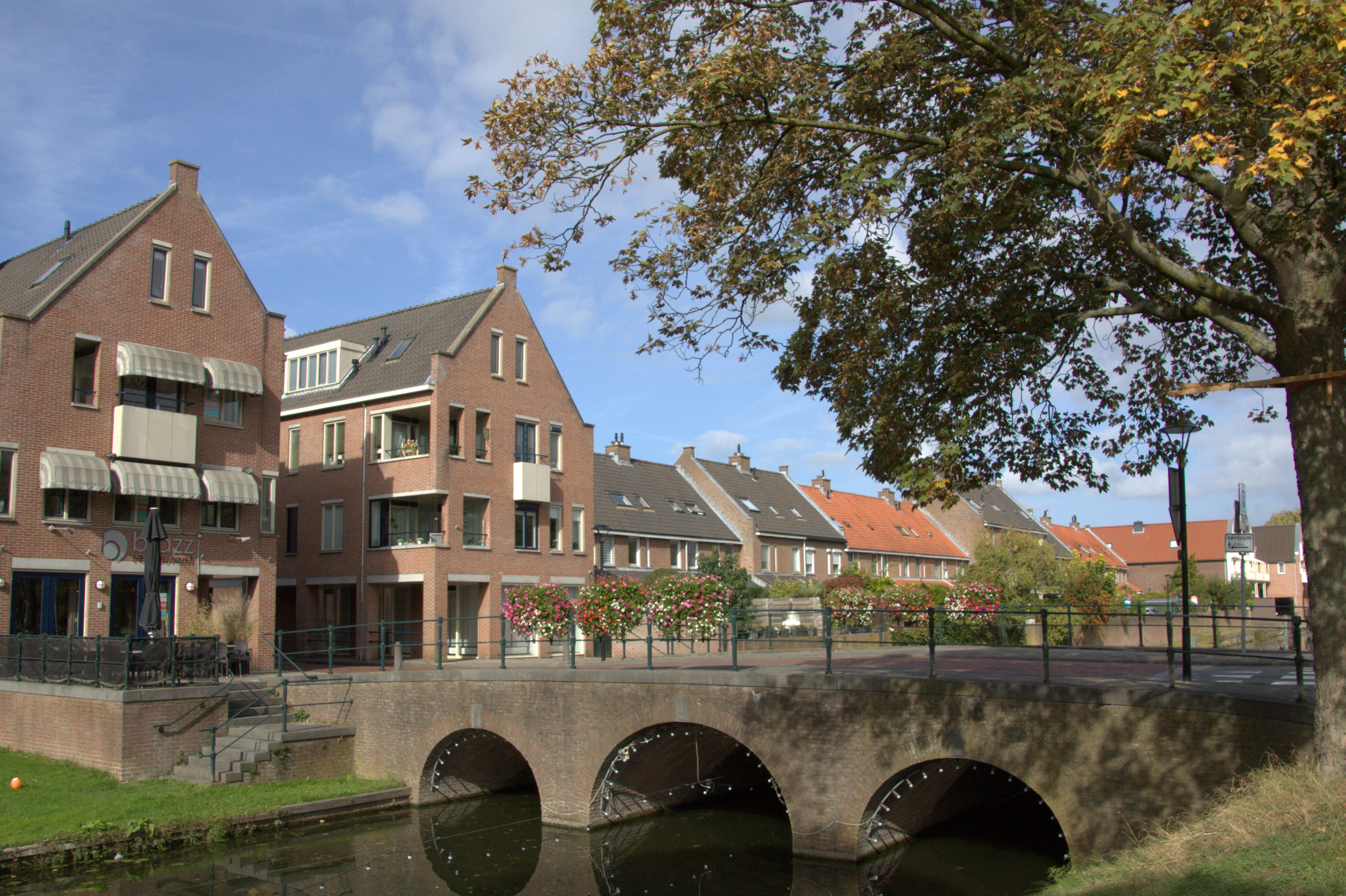
- Vianen

- Flag Coat of arms

- Location in Utrecht
- Coordinates: 52°0′N 5°6′E
- Country: Netherlands
- Province: Utrecht
- Established: 1 January 2019

Government
  - Body: Municipal council
  - Mayor: Sjors Fröhlich (Independent)
- Elevation: 1 m (3.3 ft)
- Time zone: UTC+1 (CET)
  - Summer (DST): UTC+2 (CEST)
- Postcode: 4120–4125, 4130–4146, 4163–4169, 4230–4239, 4242–4249
- Area code: 0183, 0345, 0347
- Website: www.vijfheerenlanden.nl

Vijfheerenlanden (Dutch pronunciation: [ˈvɛifˈɦeːrə(n)ˌlɑndə(n)]; lit. 'Lands of Five Lords'), is a municipality in the province of Utrecht in the Netherlands. The municipality was created on 1 January 2019 through the merger of the former municipalities of Vianen (Utrecht), Leerdam and Zederik (both South Holland). Vijfheerenlanden has 59,150 inhabitants on 1 January 2022.

Vijfheerenlanden is also the name of an area in the provinces of Utrecht (since 2002) and South Holland. The area also borders on two other Dutch provinces: Gelderland to the east, and North Brabant to the south. On its western border is the Alblasserwaard, an area in South Holland, and on its eastern border the Tielerwaard, an area in Gelderland.

The largest city of Vijfheerenlanden is Vianen, which is a major node in the Dutch network of roads and rivers. The second largest city is Leerdam.

The borders on the north and south of the area are formed by rivers, the Lek in the north and the Waal the south, the east border is formed by the line Haaften – Rhenoy – Everdingen, and the west border is formed by the line Ameide – Meerkerk – Arkel.

The area takes its name from the Lords of Arkel, of Ter Leede, of Hagestein, of Everdingen, dike builders from Haaften, and the Van Brederodes from Vianen, who together, in 1284, took measures to protect the area against the threat of water from the Geldersche Betuwe. The most eastern village in Vijfheerenlanden is Haaften, which was the village that was threatened the most by the water, and the villagers there started to heighten the dikes.

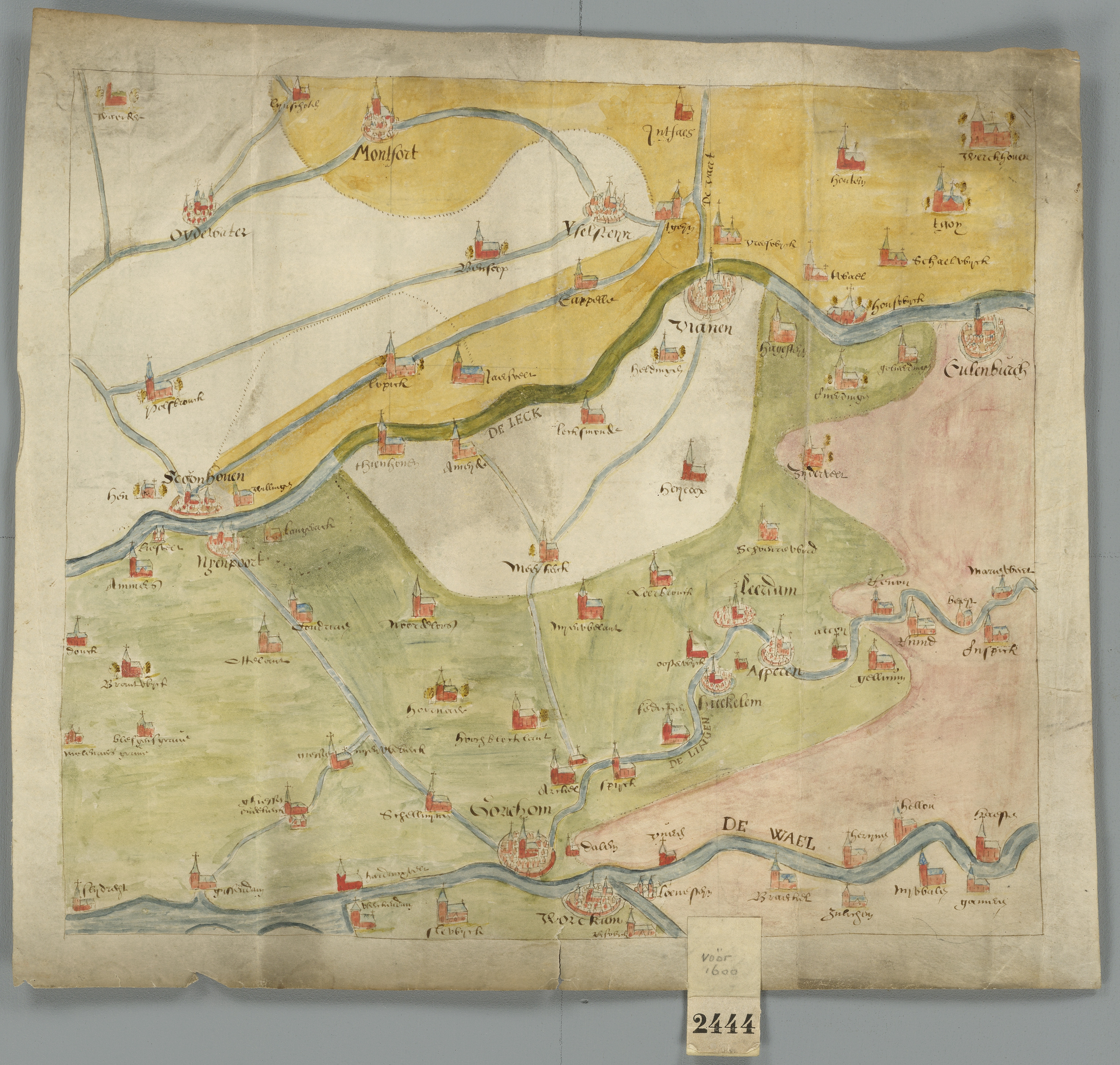
Vijfheerenlanden in the 16th century

== Population centers ==
- Ameide
- Everdingen
- Leerdam
- Tienhoven aan de Lek
- Vianen
