= Reinoud van Brederode =

Reinoud, or Reinoud van Brederode may refer to the following members of the Van Brederode family:

- Reinoud I van Brederode (1336–1390), 6th lord of Brederode
- Reinoud II van Brederode (1415–1473), 9th lord of Brederode
- Reinoud III van Brederode (1492–1556), 11th lord of Brederode
- Reinoud IV van Brederode (1520–1584), lord of Asten, Netherlands and father of Walraven III van Brederode
- Reinoud van Brederode (1567–1633), lord of Veenhuizen, North Holland and Wesenberg (Rakvere), Estonia
