= De Delftse Pauw =

Dutch pottery factory

Coordinates: 52.0239°N 4.3478°E

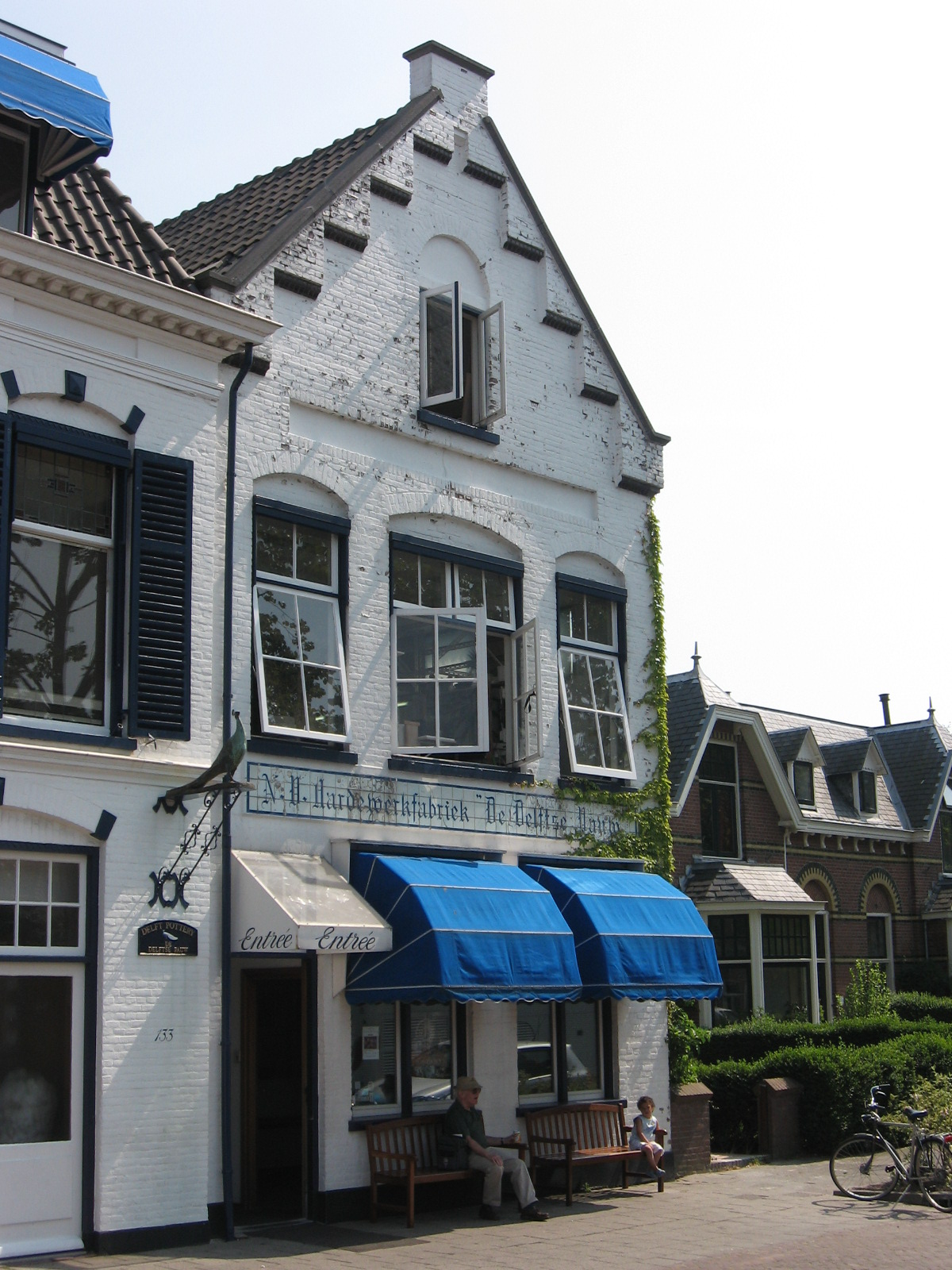
De Delftse Pauw

De Delftse Pauw was a pottery factory from the 17th century located in the north of the city Delft (in the Netherlands) on the Delftweg (close to the Schie). It was one of the few pottery factories which carry on the tradition of handpainted Delft pottery. It was taken over by Heinen Delft Blauw on 1 July 2018, but was declared bankrupt in September 2020.

De Delftse Pauw attracted around 135.000 visitors annually.
