= Walraven I van Brederode =

Walraven I van Brederode (c. 1370/73 in Santpoort – 1 December 1417 in Gorinchem) was Burgrave of Stavoren from 1400 to 1401, lord of Brederode from 1402 to 1417, and Stadtholder of Holland from 1416 to 1417.

Brederode coat of arms

== Life ==
Walraven was the son of Reinoud I van Brederode and Jolanda van Gennep. In 1396 Walraven took part in the campaigns against the West Frisians, under the command of Albert of Bavaria. Walraven was made Burgrave of Stavoren on 8 September 1400, but he kept the function for only a short time before relinquishing it again. In 1402 the lordship of Brederode was turned over to him by his older brother, Jan I van Brederode, who had decided to enter a monastic life in the monastery at Zelheim. In the same year he participated in the siege of Gorinchem, where he was taken captive. He only managed to escape in 1409, having grown much animosity against Jan V van Arkel, who had held him captive for years. He rejoined the Count of Holland, William VI and participated in the Arkel wars. On 11 August 1414 he married Johanna van Vianen, a daughter of Henry II van Vianen. As a result of the marriage he received the title of lord of Vianen and Ameide. He was a member of the council of the count of Holland, and after the death of William VI he received the temporary function of Stadtholder.

In 1417 the Hook and Cod wars broke out again, and the Cod faction, led by William van Arkel, initiated a new siege of Gorinchem. Walraven quickly moved an army to relieve Gorinchem, but in the narrow streets of the city he was struck by an arrow and died. He was buried in Vianen.

== Family ==
Walraven van Brederode and his wife Johanna van Vianen had at least three children:

- Reinoud II van Brederode (1415 – 16 October 1473)
- Gijsbrecht van Brederode (1417–1475), Bishop of Utrecht
- Walravina van Brederode (1418–1460)

Preceded by Jan I van Brederode	Lord of Brederode ?–1417	Succeeded by Reinoud II van Brederode
