= Walraven II van Brederode =

- Coat of arms of the House of Brederode
- Reign: 1473–1531
- Predecessor: Reinoud II van Brederode
- Successor: Reinoud III van Brederode
- Titles: Lord of Brederode; Lord of Vianen; Lord of Ameide; Bailiff of Hagestein; Burgrave of Utrecht
- Born: January 8, 1462
- Died: January 14, 1531
- Noble family: House of Brederode
- Spouses: Geertruida van Alphen; Margaretha van Kloetinge van Borselen; Anna van Nieuwenaar
- Issue: Reinoud III van Brederode; Walburga van Brederode; Balthazar van Brederode; others
- Father: Reinoud II van Brederode
- Mother: Yolande de Lalaing

Walraven II van Brederode (8 January 1462 – 14 January 1531) was Lord of Brederode, Vianen, Ameide, Bailiff of Hagestein and Burgrave of Utrecht.

== Life ==
He was the son of Reinoud II van Brederode and Yolande de Lalaing. When he was three years old his father named him Bailiff of Hagestein. Just like his father Reinoud II and his uncle Gijsbrecht van Brederode, he was captured by Bishop David of Burgundy in 1470, but he managed to escape with some assistance and fled to Castle Batenstein. On 16 October 1473 he succeeded his father as the 10th Lord of Brederode. Walraven's succession ceremony was interrupted by his half-brothers, who were illegitimate however, leaving Walraven as the rightful successor. In 1486 he was knighted by Maximilian of Austria, and took a place in Maximilian's council. After the death of Maximilian, Walraven searched for a way to reinstate the rule of the Hook faction, which would lead to a new war. After several years, Walraven defected to the opposing faction, which would prove to be a good decision.

== Family ==
Walraven married firstly with the non-noble Geertruida van Alphen, and had several bastard children with her, who would later make claims to the lordship of Brederode. In 1492 Walraven married the noble Margaretha van Kloetinge van Borselen. She died in 1507, after which he married Anna van Nieuwenaar on 11 May 1508.

Walraven had the following children with Geertruida van Alphen:

- Reinoud (bastard) van Brederode
- unknown (bastard) van Brederode
- Jan (bastard) van Brederode

Walraven had the following children with Magretha van Kloetinge van Borselen:

- Reinoud III van Brederode 1492–1556
- Francisca van Brederode 1500–1553
- Wolfert van Brederode ????–1548
- Françoise van Brederode ????–1553
- Charlotte van Brederode 1495–1529

Walraven had the following children with Anna van Nieuwenaar:

- Walburga van Brederode 1512–1567, grandmother of the sisters Armgard, Countess of Rietberg, and Walburgis, Countess of Rietberg;
- Frans van Brederode 1512–1529
- Margaretha van Brederode 1514–1577
- Yolande van Brederode 1515–1525
- Balthazar van Brederode 1516–1576
- Yolande van Brederode 1525–1553
- Maria van Brederode
- Reinoud van Brederode ????–1549

Preceded by Reinoud II van Brederode	Lord of Brederode ?–1531	Succeeded by Reinoud III van Brederode
