= William van Brederode =

William van Brederode may refer to:

- William van Brederode (admiral) (1380–1451), admiral-captain
- William I van Brederode (1226/30–1285), Lord of Brederode
