= Jan I =

Jan I may refer to:

- Jan I the Scholastic (1308/10 – by 1372)
- John I, Duke of Opava-Ratibor (c. 1322 – c. 1380 or 1382)
- Jan I van Brederode (1370/1372 – 1415)
- Jan I, Duke of Żagań (c. 1385 – 1439)
- Jan I Olbracht (1459–1501), King of Poland
