= Jacob van Reimerswaal =

Carmelite friar, educator and diplomat

Jacob van Reimerswaal or Jacobus van Reymerswale (died 1495) was a Carmelite friar, educator and diplomat. He became prior of the Carmelite community at Schoonhoven, and is sometimes referred to as Jacob van Schoonhoven.

== Life ==
Jacobus was presumably from Reimerswaal, a town in Zeeland later abandoned due to flooding. In 1445 he was studying philosophy at the Carmelite house in Brussels under Fr Joannes van Kempen and in 1446 he was enrolled at the order's house of studies in Leuven. In 1459 he was lecturing on the Bible in Leuven and in 1462 he was an instructor in theology at the house in Brussels. He held bachelor, licentiate and doctoral degrees from the University of Leuven. In 1470, the year that he obtained his doctorate, he was appointed prior of the Carmelite friary in Schoonhoven, a position he resigned in 1472.

In 1477 Jacobus mediated the settlement of the dispute between Yolande de Lalaing and Reinier van Broekhuizen over control of the estate of Yolande's deceased husband (and Reinier's brother-in-law) Reinoud II van Brederode. In 1482 he mediated between Joost de Lalaing, Stadtholder of the County of Holland, and the city of Utrecht.

In 1495 Jacobus was appointed Vicar Provincial, but he died later that year.
