= Yolande de Lalaing =

Burgundian Netherlands noble (c.1422–1497)

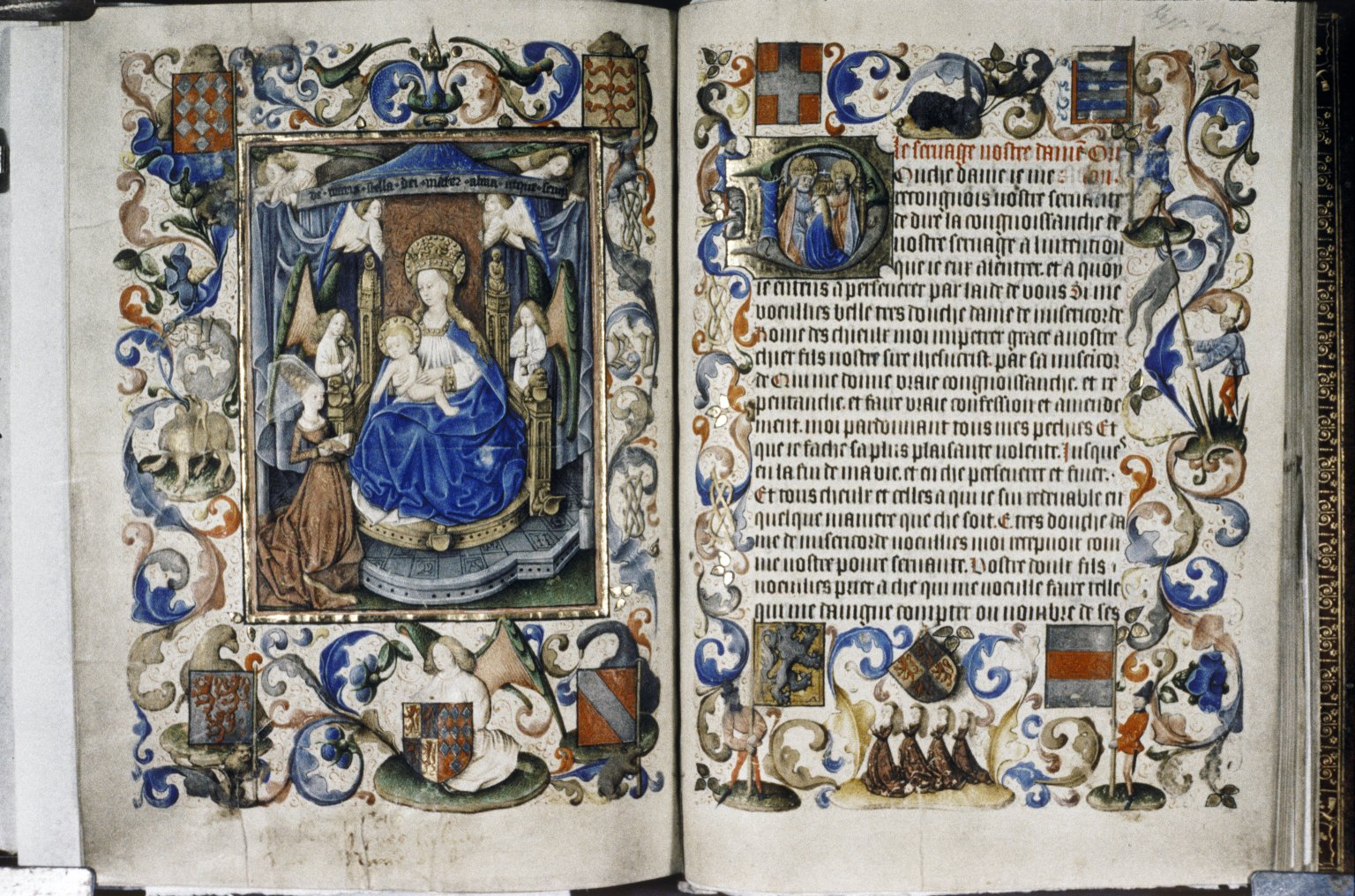
Yolande depicted at prayer in her Book of Hours

Yolande de Lalaing (c.1422-1497) was a noble heiress in the Burgundian Netherlands.

== Life ==
Yolande was born on the family estate at Lallaing in the County of Hainaut (now in northern France) to Guillaume de Lalaing (of the Lalaing family) and Jeanne de Créquy. Together with her younger sister Isabelle, she was raised at the court of the Dukes of Burgundy, where her father held a position in the household of Isabella of Portugal, Duchess of Burgundy.

In 1440 Yolande followed her father to The Hague, where he had been appointed Stadtholder of Holland and Zeeland. In 1445 he was removed from office, having become embroiled in the civil strife between "Hooks" and "Cods", and in the same year Yolande married one of the leading noblemen of the "Hook" party, Reinoud II van Brederode. The couple had five daughters and two sons. Yolande lived mostly at Batestein Castle in Vianen but also on her husband's properties in Utrecht, where her brother-in-law Gijsbrecht van Brederode was dean of the cathedral chapter.

Yolande ran her husband's estates when he was imprisoned by David of Burgundy, Bishop of Utrecht, from 1470 to 1472, and after his sudden death in October 1473. Her two sons, Walraven and Frans, were then aged 11 and 9. Shortly after her husband's death, Yolande commissioned a family chronicle from Johannes a Leydis, tracing the descent of the House of Brederode back to ancient Troy. The Latin text was completed in 1482, and a Dutch version in 1486.

Although Reinoud had on his deathbed designated his wife as their sons' guardian, several male relatives also claimed a right to administer the family's affairs. Foremost among them was Reinier van Broekhuizen, who in 1477 took control of the town and castle of Vianen by force, and gained physical possession of three of Yolande's children. A settlement was reached allowing Yolande to retire to Brederode Castle in Santpoort, part of her dower, while leaving Reinier in control of the main properties until Walraven reached his age of majority in 1480. The agreement was mediated by Carmelite prior Jacob van Schoonhoven.

Her younger son, Frans, died in 1490 after leading a rebellion against Maximilian of Habsburg known as the Squire Francis War.

After Brederode Castle was badly damaged during the Bread and Cheese Revolt in 1492, Yolande returned to Batenstein Castle. There she died on 15 August 1497.

Her illuminated book of hours is preserved in the Bodleian Library as Manuscript Douce 93.
