= Reinoud III =

Reinoud III may refer to:

- Reinoud III of Guelders (1333–1371)
- Reinoud III van Brederode (1492–1556)
