= Reinoud II =

Reinoud II may refer to:

- Reinoud II of Guelders (c. 1295 – 1343)
- Reinoud II van Brederode (1415–1473)
