= Nooddorp =

- Neighborhood of Rotterdam
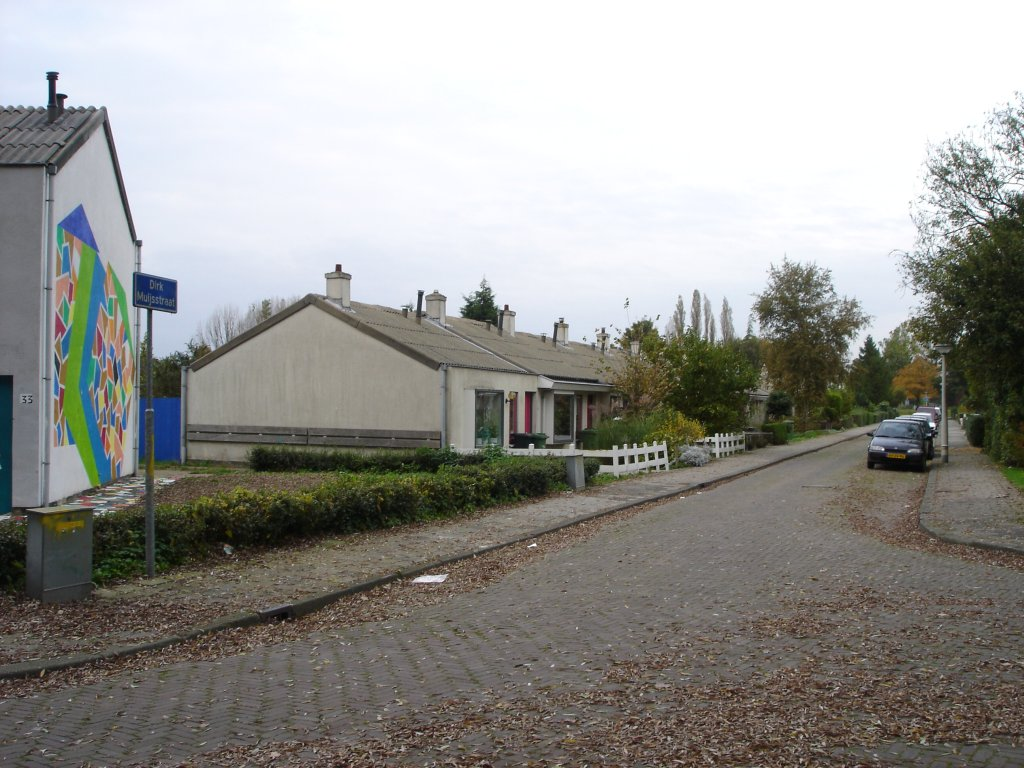
- The Dirk Muijsstraat in the deelgemeente IJsselmonde, district Lombardijen/Smeetsland in Rotterdam
- Country: Netherlands
- Province: South Holland
- COROP: Rotterdam
- Borough: Overschie
- Established: 1942
- Time zone: UTC+1 (CET)

Nooddorp is a neighborhood of Rotterdam, Netherlands.
