= Kandelaar =

Coordinates: 51°57′N 4°24′E

- Neighborhood of Rotterdam
- Interactive map of Kandelaar
- Country: Netherlands
- Province: South Holland
- COROP: Rotterdam
- Borough: Overschie
- Time zone: UTC+1 (CET)

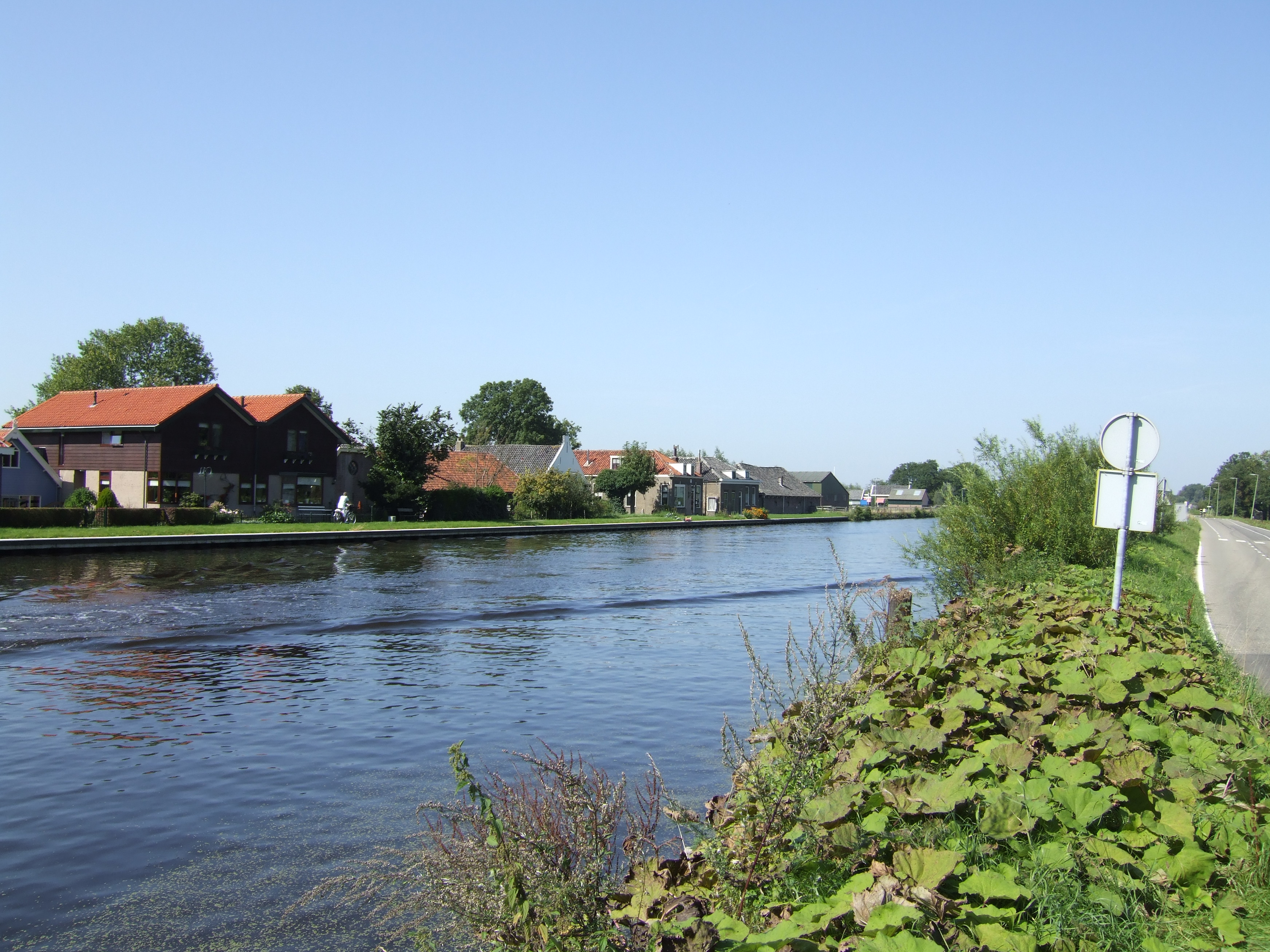
Kandelaar, 2006

Kandelaar is a neighborhood of Rotterdam, Netherlands.
