= Kleinpolder =

Coordinates: 51°56′03″N 4°25′46″E

- Neighborhood of Rotterdam
- Interactive map of Kleinpolder
- Country: Netherlands
- Province: South Holland
- COROP: Rotterdam
- Borough: Overschie
- Time zone: UTC+1 (CET)

Kleinpolder (Dutch pronunciation: [klɛimˈpɔldər]) is a neighborhood of Rotterdam, Netherlands.

Kleinpolderplein (Kleinpolder square), is home to a 2012 sculpture garden, constructed underneath one of the busiest interchanges in the Netherlands.
