= Lancelot van Brederode =

Dutch general

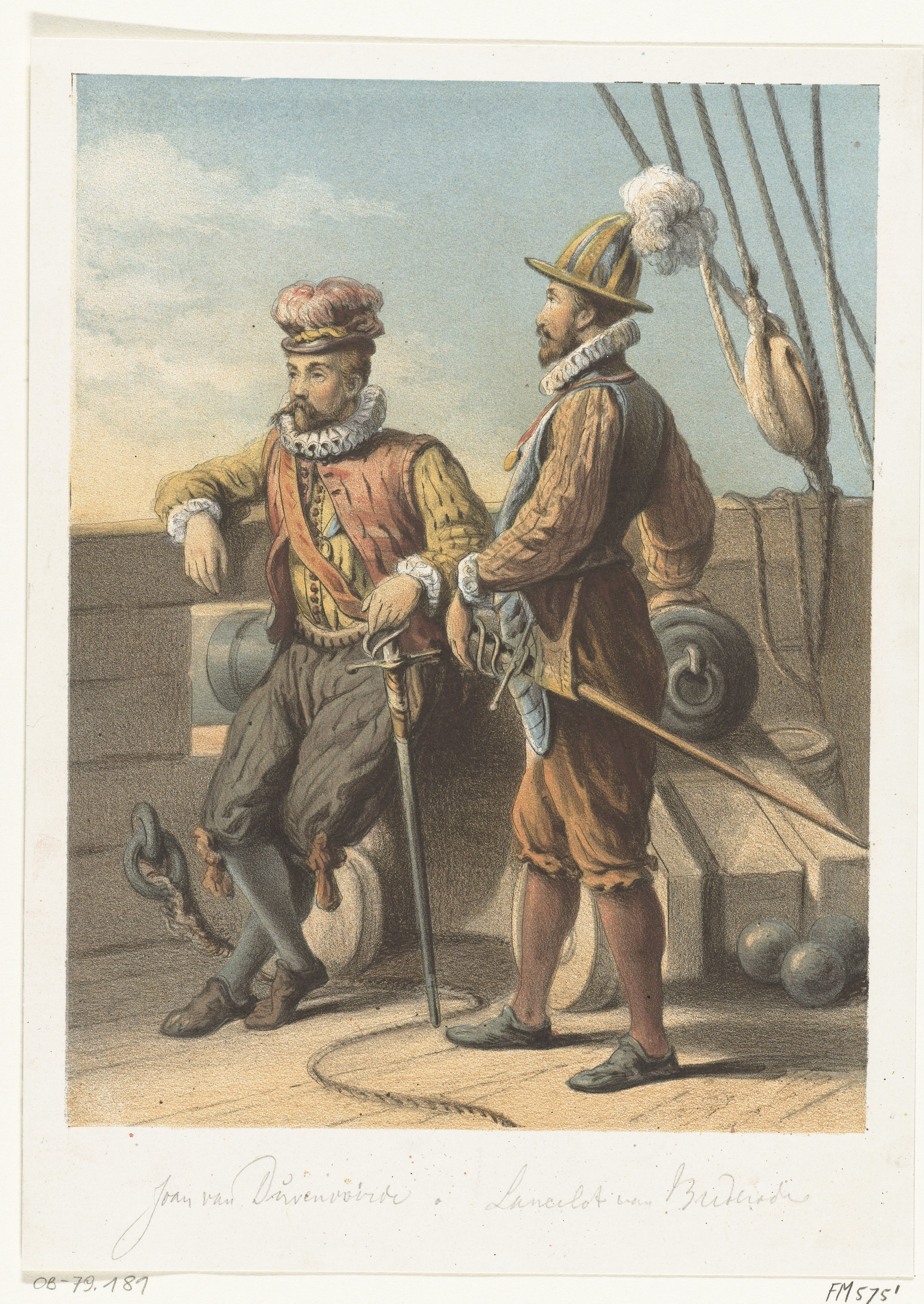
Portrait of Jan van Duivenvoorde with Lancelot van Brederode (by Johannes Hilverdink, 1572).

Lancelot van Brederode (died 20 July 1573, Schoten) was a Dutch general in the Dutch Revolt. He was vice admiral of the ‘Geuzen’, or ‘Sea Beggars’, and served as a captain in the army of Louis of Nassau.

He is not to be confused with another Lancelot van Brederode (c.1583–1668), associate of Frans Kuyper.

== Life ==
An illegitimate son of Reinoud III van Brederode by Anna Simonsdochter, his year of birth is unknown.
A convinced Protestant, he was active between 1569 and 1572 as commander of a fleet of Sea beggars, and caused great damage to Spanish trade. He participated in the resistance at the Siege of Haarlem, but when the city fell the Spanish beheaded him and demolished the van Brederode castle.

He was married to Adriana van Treslong, with whom he had five sons and four daughters. Among his sons was Reinoud van Brederode, son-in-law to Johan van Oldenbarnevelt.
His half-brother Hendrick van Brederode was also a general in the revolt.
