= Frédéric Perrenot =

Frédéric Perrenot (1536–1600), lord of Champagney, baron of Renaix, was a soldier and diplomat in Habsburg service.

== Life ==
Perrenot was born in Barcelona on 3 April 1536, the fifth and youngest son of Nicole Bonvalot and Nicolas Perrenot de Granvelle, a close adviser to Charles V. His studies at the University of Padua were cut short by his father's death in 1550. He served at the Battle of Renty (1554). In 1559 he accompanied Philip II to Spain, then returned to the Low Countries, where he was aligned with his oldest brother, Antoine Perrenot de Granvelle. He served against the Dutch Revolt under the command of Fadrique de Toledo, before returning to Burgundy to command the garrison at Besançon. In 1571 he was appointed Governor of Antwerp.

In a memorandum to the Duke of Medinaceli in 1573 he criticised the policy of terror that had been pursued by the Duke of Alva, the arrogance and tyranny of Spanish soldiery, and the infringement of ancient customs and liberties. Between 1574 and 1576 he was much away from Antwerp on diplomatic missions. Returning to Antwerp in the summer of 1576, he several times wrote to the Council of State warning of the mounting dangers of the situation there. At the Sack of Antwerp in November 1576 he sought refuge in Middelburg. His house in Antwerp was looted by the mutineers. He was a supporter of the Pacification of Ghent, agreed later the same month, but while criticising royal policy he remained loyal to the king. In 1578 he was imprisoned in Ghent by the rebels, and several times threatened with death. In June 1579 he briefly escaped but was recaptured.

While in captivity, he wrote pamphlets against the rebels, including Advis d'ung bon bourgois de la ville de Gand, clandestinely printed in 1583, which elicited a reply from Marnix of Saint-Aldegonde.

After the reconciliation of Ghent on 17 September 1584, Perrenot was liberated through a prisoner exchange. He was appointed commander of Ghent citadel, with a garrison of Walloon troops. In September 1585 he was again appointed governor of Antwerp, where he negotiated the rebuilding of Antwerp Citadel with the city council, but was removed from office the following year. He became a vocal critic of Alexander Farnese, who on 14 October 1592 ordered him to leave Brussels and return to his native Burgundy. He settled in Dole, dying there in 1600.

== Writings ==
- Recueils contenans par quels moyens les gens de guerre Espaignols ammenez es Pays Bas par le duc d'Alve, s'estans mutinez en iceux diverses fois, entrerent en Anvers (Lyon, 1578).
- Advis d'ung bon bourgois de la ville de Gand (1583).
