= Thomas Perrenot de Granvelle =

Thomas Perrenot de Granvelle (Besançon, 22 May 1514 – Besançon, 13 February 1571), Lord of Chantonnay, Count of Cantecroy, was a diplomat in Habsburg service. He was Spanish Ambassador in London, Paris, and Vienna.

== Life ==
He belonged to the illustrious family of Franche-Comté that faithfully served the House of Austria in high positions, specifically Emperor Charles V and his son Philip II. He was the eldest son of Nicolas Perrenot de Granvelle, who was Charles V's chief minister. Thomas was therefore the brother of Cardinal Antoine Perrenot de Granvelle, Philip II's minister.

Like the other members of his family, he was highly skilled in foreign affairs, which he demonstrated at a young age. He traveled to England in 1542 with the mission of persuading King Henry VIII to join the Emperor in the war against France. In 1547, by order of Charles V, he returned to England, this time to convey to the new monarch, King Edward VI, his condolences on the death of his father.
They also entrusted him with missions among the princes of the House of Austria, participating in the negotiations and proxy marriage of the Infanta Maria, daughter of Emperor Charles V, to her cousin, Archduke Maximilian, son of Ferdinand I. This allowed him to develop a close personal relationship with the Archduke, the future Emperor Maximilian II. Other diplomatic missions on behalf of Charles V took him to visit the emperor's niece, Princess Christina of Lorraine, in 1552.

Later, Philip II, who greatly valued his diplomatic skills, entrusted Chantonnay with the embassy to Paris in 1559. He intervened there in the negotiations for the marriage of Philip II to Elisabeth of Valois and accompanied her on her journey through France, en route to Spain.

The post of Spanish ambassador to the turbulent French court was arduous and complex at that time, when the last sovereigns of the House of Valois-Angoulême were struggling to maintain their position in a kingdom in political and religious turmoil.

In accordance with his mandate on behalf of the Catholic King, who was the champion of the Counter-Reformation in Europe, Chantonnay acted in France as a resolute enemy of the French Huguenots and a staunch protector of the Catholics, while lamenting how France was "being led to perdition by heretics." This did little to endear him to the Parisian court.

In 1564 Queen Catherine de' Medici's pleas for his release finally persuaded Philip II to recall him from France. The King, who was very pleased with Chantonnay's loyalty and service, decided to send him as his ambassador to the imperial court of his Habsburg relatives in Vienna.

In this new post, Chantonnay encountered Emperor Maximilian II, whom he had known well for decades, and who had bestowed upon him and his wife the honor of baptizing his son, Archduke Charles in 1565. A bond of trust from old times had remained between the Emperor and the ambassador, but so too had mutual misgivings. Moreover, Maximilian possessed a tolerant character in religious matters that was viewed with vehement suspicion in Madrid.

The family ties, however, and their shared interests in international politics fostered dynastic unity between the two branches in Madrid and Vienna, a unity further strengthened by the Emperor's harmonious marriage to his Spanish cousin, Maria.

Although Chantonnay was the privileged ambassador of Vienna's most reliable ally, his dealings were overshadowed by mutual doubts regarding the approach to religious policy: firm and uncompromising on the part of Philip II, and tolerant and accommodating on the part of his imperial cousin and brother-in-law Maximilian II.

In 1570, Chantonnay was relieved of his post as ambassador for health reasons. His precarious health worsened en route for home, and death overtook him on 13 February 1571. His body was taken to the family tomb in Besançon.

== Marriage and children ==
Chantonnay had married Helena de Brederode, daughter of Reinoud III van Brederode, in 1549. They had :

- Octavio Perrenot de Granvelle, killed in the Battle of the Scheldt (1574)
- Nicolas Perrenot de Granvelle, Comte de Cantecroix, died in Naples
- François Perrenot de Granvelle, Comte de Cantecroix, Lord of Chantonnay, died 1607 in Prague
- Jean Thomas Perrenot de Granvelle, killed on the Spanish Armada (1588)
- Petronelle, married Pierre-Antoine d'Oiselay, baron de la Villeneuve, had issue.
