= Veenhuizen, North Holland =

Veenhuizen
- Hamlet
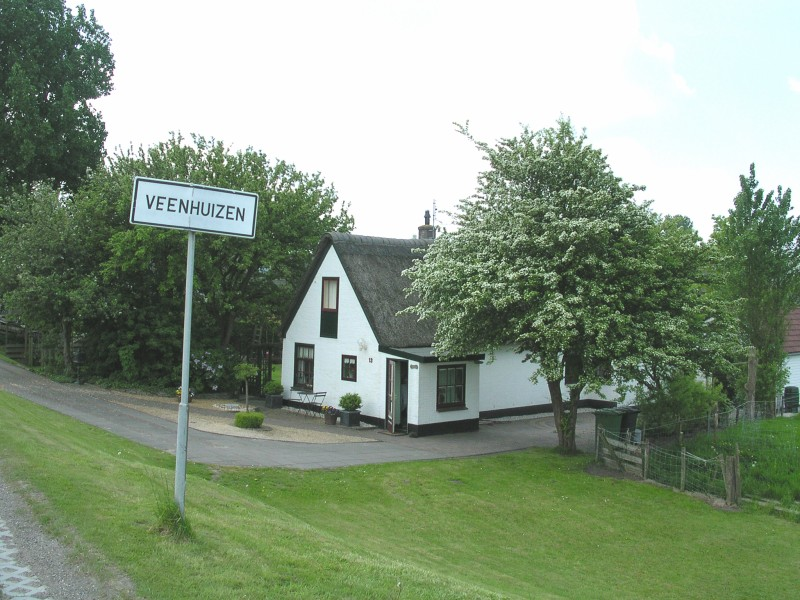
- Village entrance

- Coat of arms

- Location in the Netherlands Location in the province of North Holland in the Netherlands
- Coordinates: 52°42′09″N 4°53′25″E
- Country: Netherlands
- Province: North Holland
- Municipality: Dijk en Waard
- Time zone: UTC+1 (CET)
  - Summer (DST): UTC+2 (CEST)
- Postal code: 1704
- Dialing code: 072

Veenhuizen (West Frisian: Fenenhúze) is a village in the Dutch province of North Holland. It is located in the former municipality of Heerhugowaard, about 6 km northeast of Heerhugowaard itself.

Veenhuizen was a separate municipality from 1817 to 1854, when it was merged with Heerhugowaard.

It is not a statistical entity. and the postal authorities have placed it under Heerhugowaard. It consists of about 160 houses.

Since 2022 it has been part of the new municipality of Dijk en Waard.

== Gallery ==
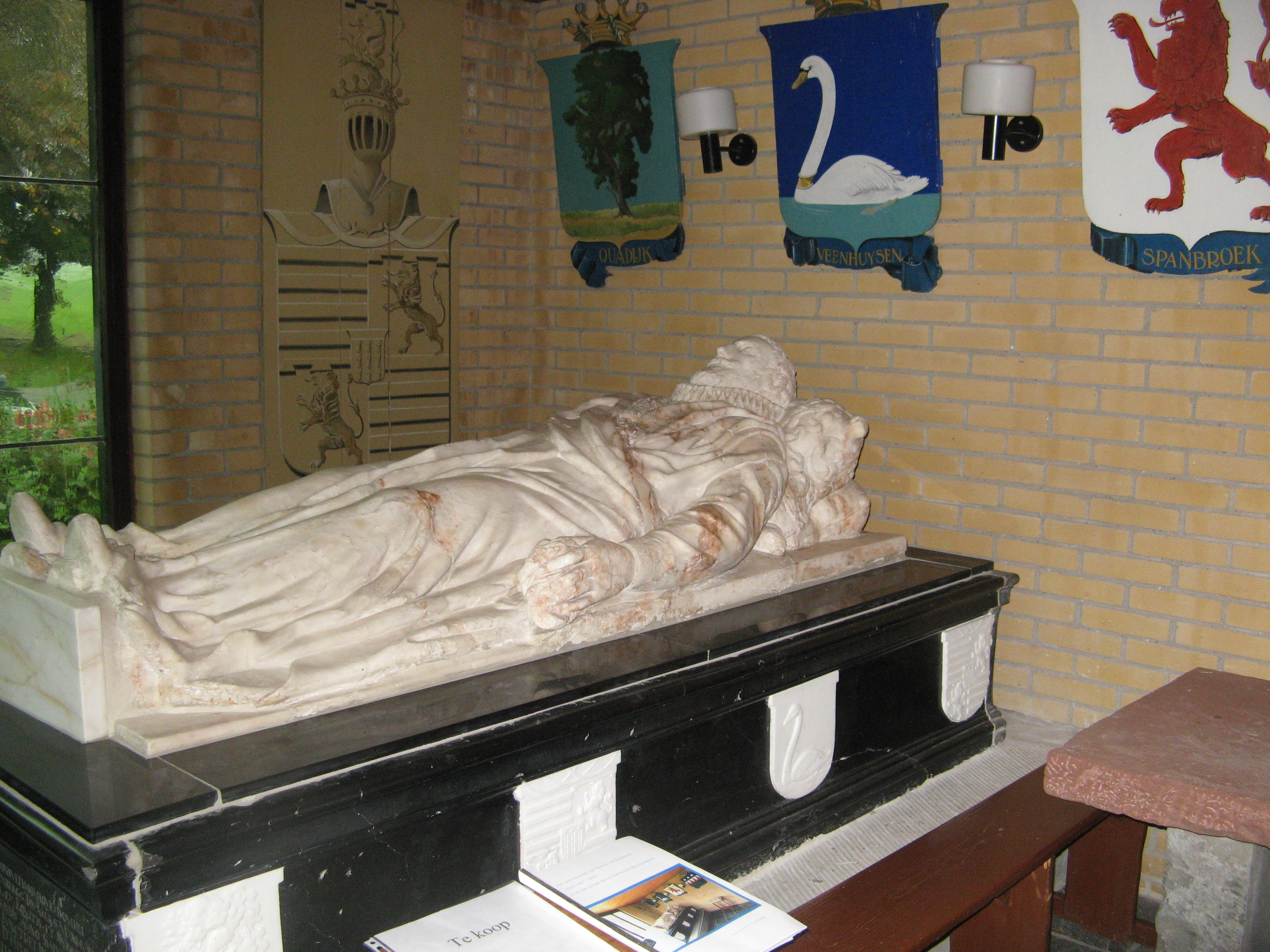
Grave of Reinoud van Brederode (1567–1633) in the church of Veenhuizen

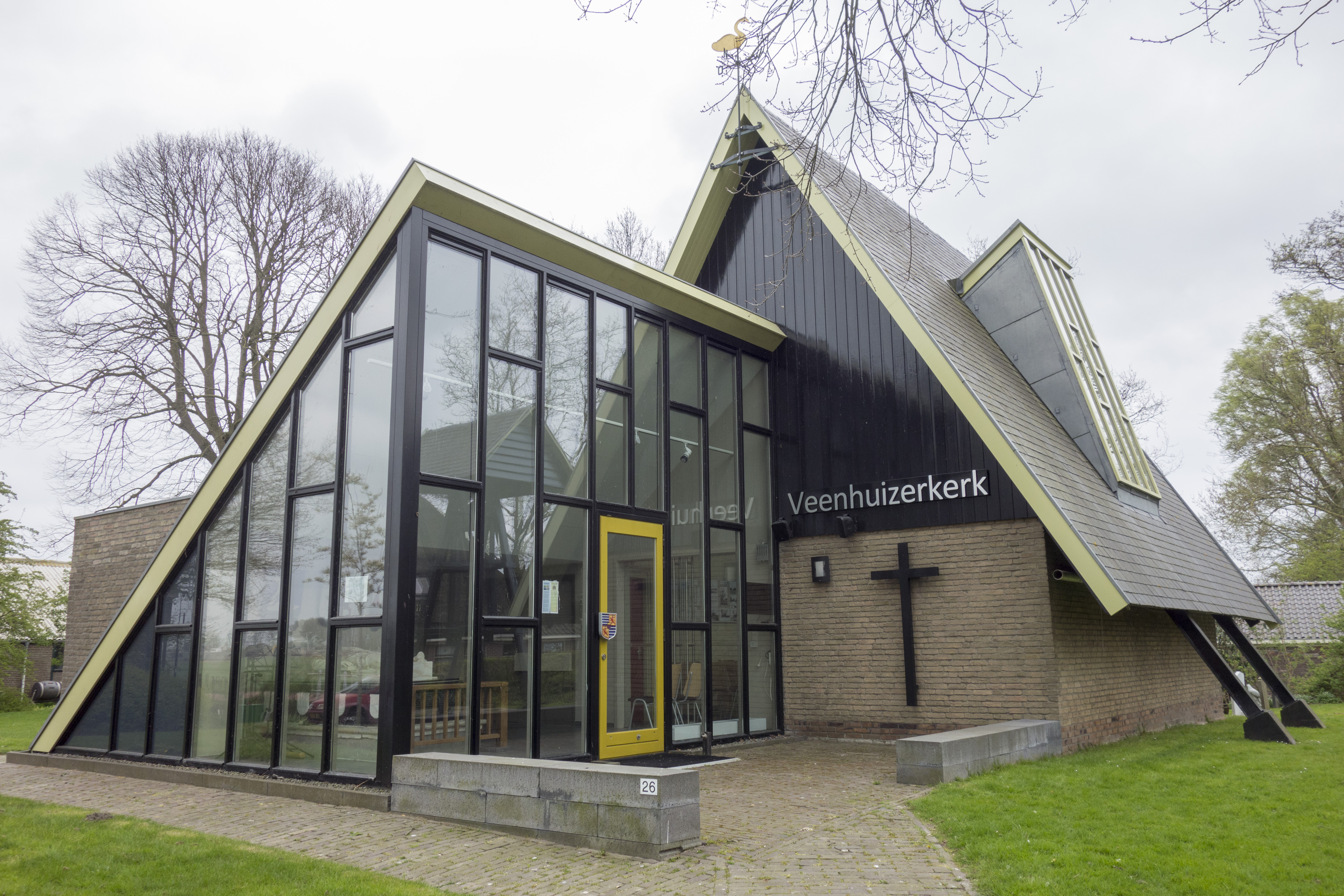
Veenhuizerkerk
