= Schielands Hoge Zeedijk =

Coordinates: 52.0200°N 4.6700°E

Schielands Hoge Zeedijk, formerly called Hoogendijk ("high dike") is a Dutch dike in the province of South Holland that stretches from the Schie at Schiedam to the Gouwe near Gouda. Constructed in the 13th century, the dike continues to protect an area inhabited by 3 million people from flooding by the North Sea.

== History ==
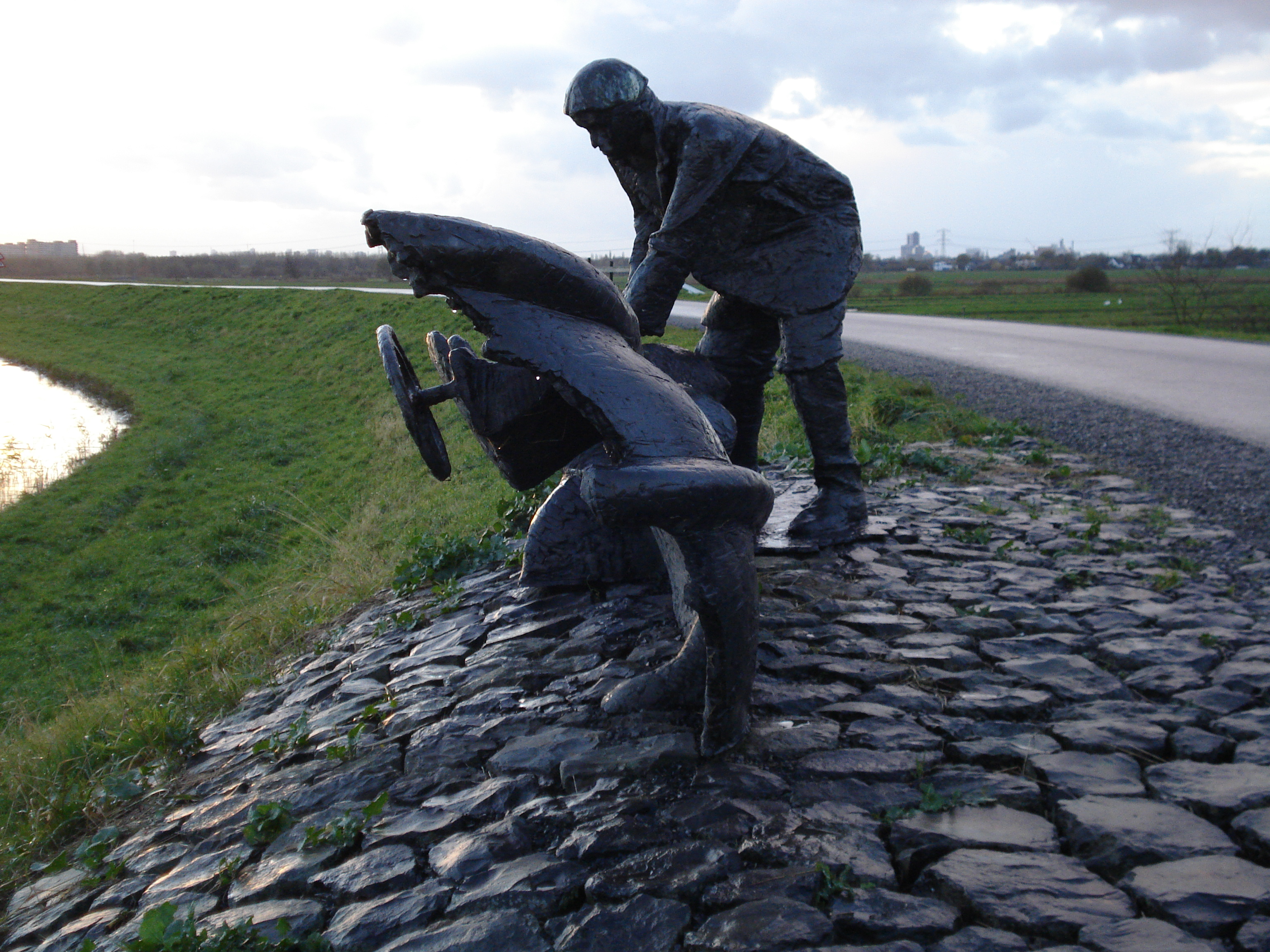
Dubbeltje op zijn kant, a monument commemorating the North Sea flood of 1953

Schielands Hoge Zeedijk was constructed in the 13th century by order of Adelaide of Holland, a noblewoman who was regent of Holland while her nephew, Floris V, Count of Holland, was a minor.

The Schielands Hoge Zeedijk never really collapsed, though the All Saints' Flood of 1570 indicated its weakness. In 1574 it was deliberately cut through in sixteen places during the Siege of Leiden. On 1 February 1953, during the North Sea Flood of 1953, the dike almost collapsed between Capelle aan den IJssel and Nieuwerkerk aan den IJssel; the hole was filled by sailing a ship into the dike, an event commemorated by the monument Dubbeltje op zijn kant ("dime on its edge", a Dutch proverb indicating a dramatic event nearly happened).

== Current structure ==
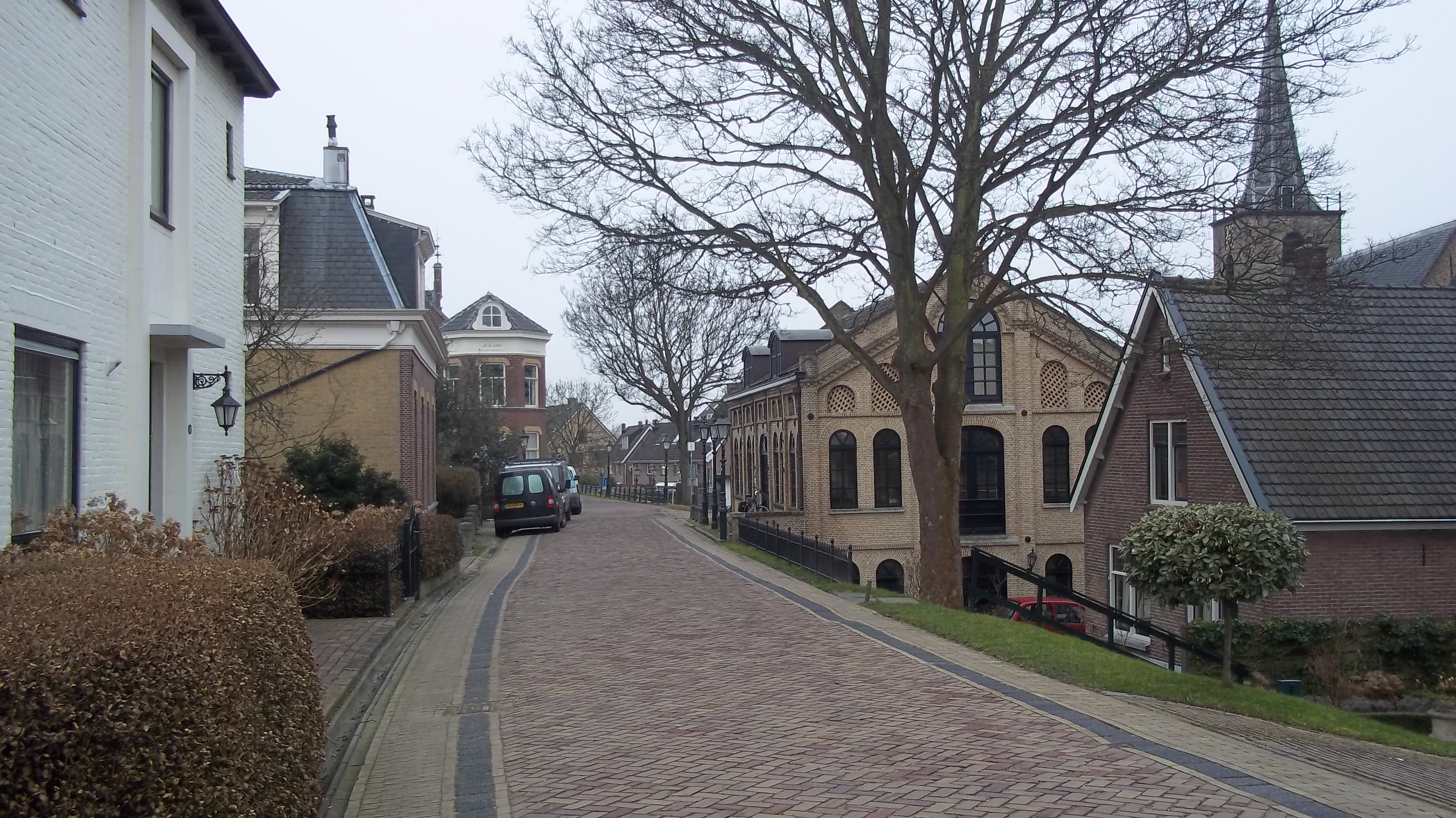
The Hoogendijk near the centre of Capelle aan den IJssel (picture: C. Hoogendijk)

The Hoogendijk starts in Schiedam and routes via the city of Rotterdam towards the Oosthaven of the city of Gouda. It follows basically the Northern bank of the rivers Nieuwe Maas and the Hollandse IJssel. Nowadays the dike ends at the Julianasluis near Gouda; from 1856 till 1936 the dike ended at an upstream lock called Waaiersluis. The old name of the dike is De Hoogendijk or De Hooge(n) Zeedijk (The High Sea Dike). The Hoogendijk is maintained by 'the Hoogheemraadschap van Schieland en de Krimpenerwaard' and classified as a primary waterbarrier. The total length of the dike is 27 kilometres.

=== Schiedam ===
- Rotterdamsedijk

=== Rotterdam ===
- Rotterdamsedijk (officially: Schiedamseweg) · Mathenesserdijk · Havenstraat · Westzeedijk (tot Parksluizen oorspronkelijk tracé zuidkant Heiman Dullaertplein · Pieter de Hoochstraat) · Vasteland · Schiedamsedijk · Korte Hoogstraat · Hoogstraat · Oostzeedijk · Honingerdijk · Nesserdijk · Schaardijk

=== Capelle aan den IJssel ===
- IJsseldijk/Nijverheidsstraat · Ketensedijk · Dorpsstraat · Groenedijk

=== Zuidplas ===
- Groenendijk · Kortenoord · Schielandse Hoge Zeedijk-West · Westeinde · Dorpsstraat · Oosteinde · Schielandse Hoge Zeedijk-Oost

=== Gouda ===
- Sluisdijk · Schielands Hoge Zeedijk
