= Zestienhoven (district) =

Coordinates: 51°57′25″N 004°26′14″E

- Neighborhood of Rotterdam
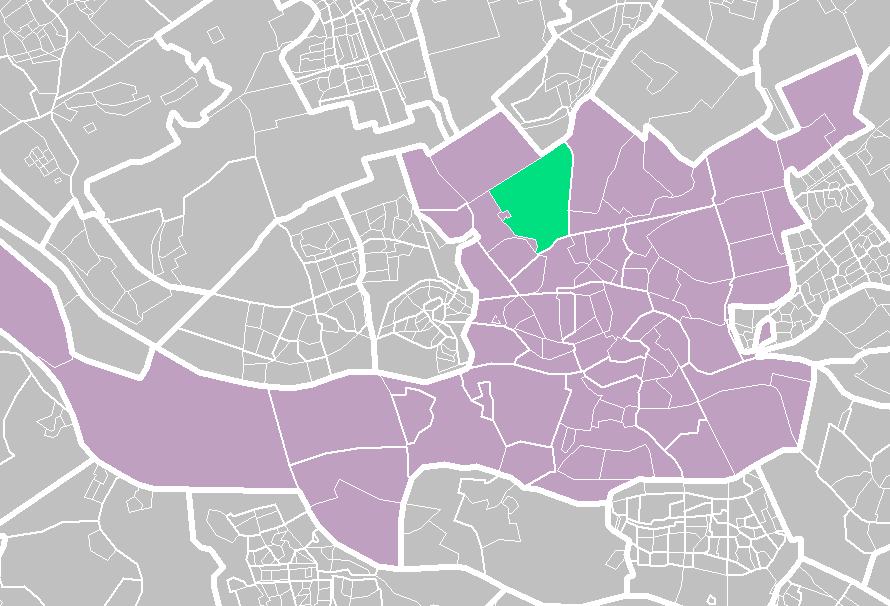
- Country: Netherlands
- Province: South Holland
- COROP: Rotterdam
- Borough: Overschie
- Time zone: UTC+1 (CET)

Zestienhoven is a neighborhood of Rotterdam, Netherlands and is part of the borough Overschie. Zestienhoven is the largest district in Overschie, but is sparsely populated. The Polder Zestienhoven is within the district, east of the urban area of Overschie. On the east side is the neighborhood Schiebroek and on the north side Rotterdam The Hague Airport.
