= Frans van Brederode =

Frans van Brederode (February 4, 1465 – August 11, 1490) was a rebel in Holland against the rule of emperor Maximilian, father and regent of Duke Philip the Handsome of Burgundy.

Brederode coat of arms

Duke Philip was Count of Holland - Brederode belonged to the Hook faction in Holland, which did not acknowledge Maximilian.

Brederode was born in Vianen. He conquered Rotterdam in 1488 and tried to conquer many other cities during the Squire Francis War. He was successful only in Woerden and Geertruidenberg in 1489. He was defeated during the Battle of Brouwershaven (1490) in 1490, and subsequently died in prison in Dordrecht of the wounds received during the battle.

He was a son of Reinoud II van Brederode and Yolande de Lalaing.
