= Reinoud van Brederode (1567–1633) =

- Born: 1567; Huis ter Kleef, Haarlem
- Died: 7 January 1633; The Hague

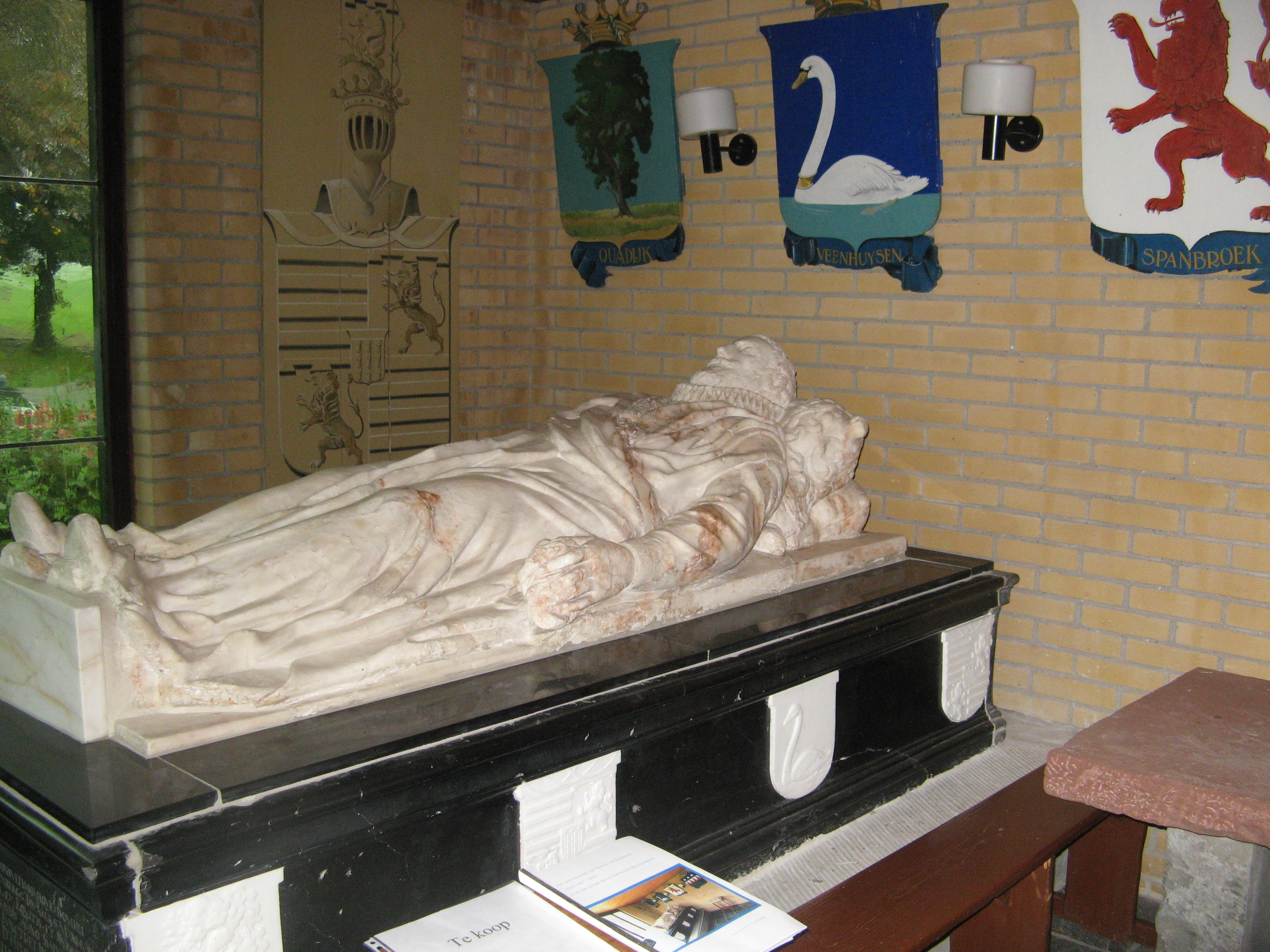
His tomb.

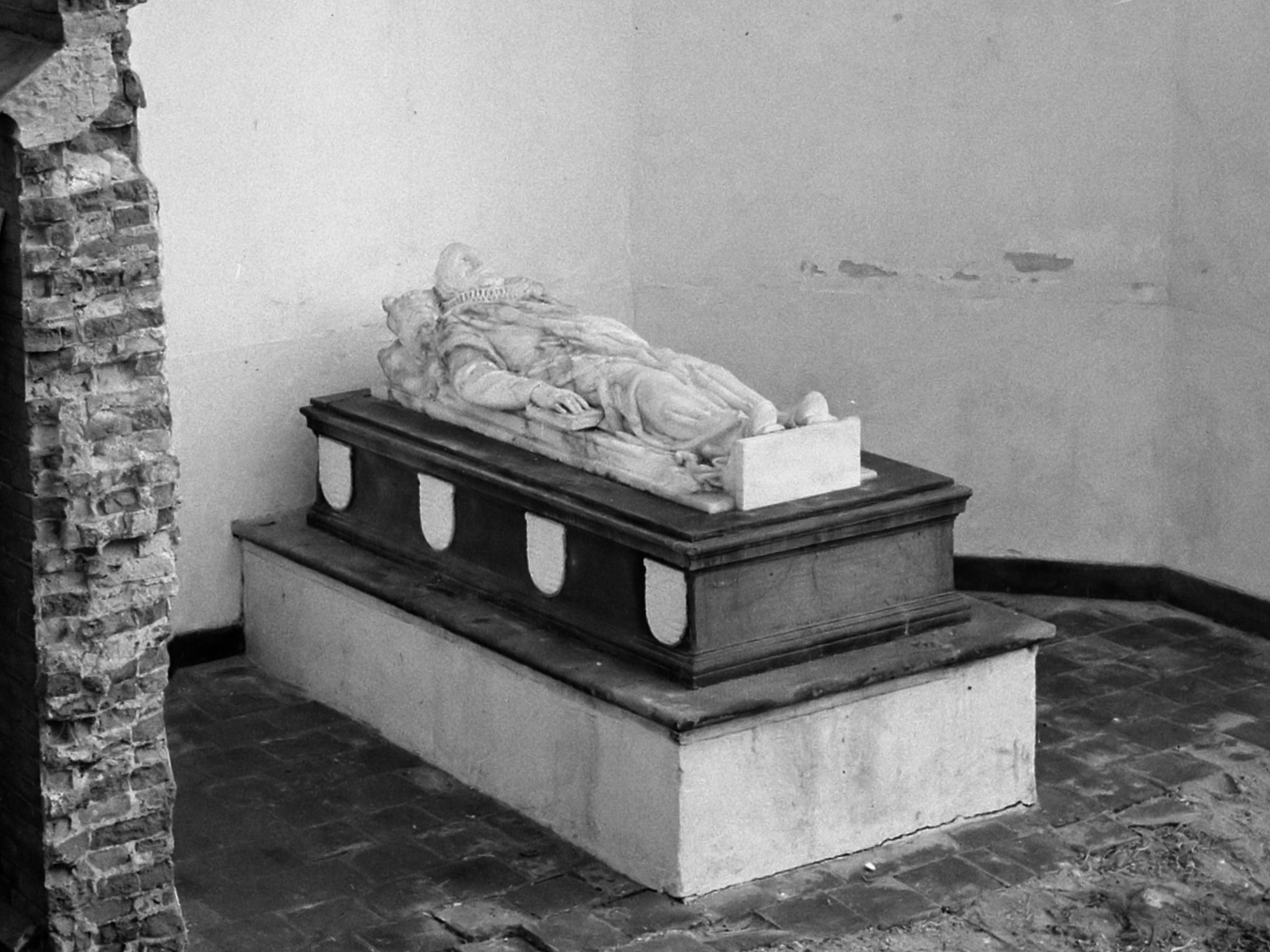
His tomb before 1965.

Reinoud van Brederode was a Dutch nobleman, lawyer and diplomat of the Dutch Golden Age. He was lord of Veenhuizen, Spanbroek, Oosthuizen, Etersheim, Hobrede and Kwadijk.

== Life ==
From the Van Brederode family, he was the eldest son of Lancelot van Brederode and Adriana van Blois van Treslong. His father Lancelot was an illegitimate son of Reinoud III van Brederode who with his legitimate half-brother Hendrik van Brederode played a major part in the Dutch Revolt. Lancelot was vice-admiral of the 'watergeuzen' or sea beggars, and captain at the Siege of Haarlem. After Haarlem fell, Lancelot was beheaded by the Spanish in 1573.

As son-in-law to Johan van Oldenbarnevelt, Reinoud van Brederode was appointed presiding counselor of the Hoge Raad van Holland en Zeeland on 20 April 1602. He was sent to Sweden and the Russian Empire as a diplomat in 1615 and headed the Dutch delegation which brokered the Treaty of Stolbovo. In thanks Gustav II Adolphus made him a 'freiherr' or baron of Wezenberg (now Rakvere in northern Estonia) in 1616.

Van Brederode returned to the Netherlands in August 1616. He attempted in vain to get his father-in-law out of prison in 1618, who was beheaded the following year. Van Brederode was a knight of Holland between 1603 and 1619 and between 1632 and 1633, whilst Henry IV of France made him a knight of France in 1605. He married four times:

1. 23 January 1597, to Geertruid van Oldenbarnevelt, daughter of Johan van Oldenbarnevelt and Maria van Utrecht (died 1601), with whom he had three daughters, including Elisabeth van Brederode, who inherited the lordship of Veenhuizen on Reinoud's death
2. 1603, to Maria van der Duin (died 1607), with whom he had Adam van Brederode (1604-1608)
3. 1612, to Anna van Lijnen (died 1624), with whom he had one daughter
4. 1630, to Petronella van Hiniossa.

He is buried in a chapel in Veenhuizen, surmounted by a marble effigy of him. When the chapel was demolished in 1965, the tomb was moved to the town's Reformed Church.

== Sources ==
- http://www.gahetna.nl/collectie/archief/pdf/NL-HaNA_3.20.87.ead.pdf
- http://members.home.nl/tetrode/Geuzen/Lancelot.htm
