= Siege of Gouda (1428) =

1428 siege

- Part of Hook and Cod wars
Date	May–July 1428
Location	Gouda
Result	Burgundian victory

Belligerents
Hooks	Burgundian State; Cod allies

Commanders and leaders
Jacqueline of Hainault; Willem van Brederode	Philip the Good

Strength
Unknown	20,000

Casualties and losses
Unknown	Unknown

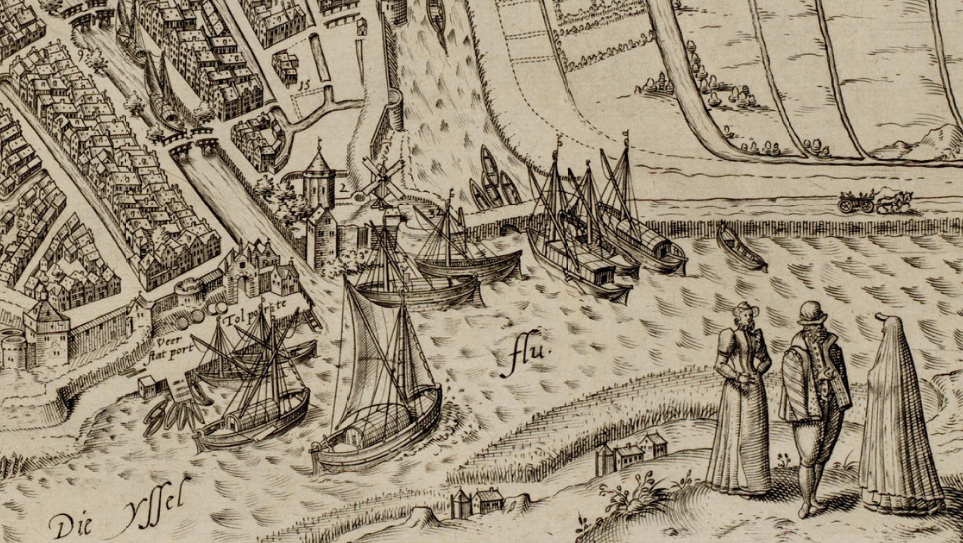
Fragment of a map of Gouda by Braun & Hogenberg

The siege of Gouda (1428) was a siege that ended the second phase of the Hook and Cod wars.

== Prelude ==
After escaping her detention in 1425 from the Gravensteen in Gent, Jacqueline, Countess of Hainaut settled in Gouda, which was the capital of the Hook movement at that time. From her castle she continued her fight against the Cods to get Holland and Zeeland back. When she learned at some point that the enemy had brought together an army in Leiden to first attack Alphen aan den Rijn and then Gouda, she decided to attack first. Jacqueline gathered all her troops from Schoonhoven, Oudewater and Gouda and surprised and defeated the Cod army at the Battle of Alphen aan den Rijn (1425). The banners of the cities of Haarlem, Leiden and Amsterdam were taken back as a trophy to Gouda.
However, in the following years, the Hooks suffered several defeats, including the Battle of Brouwershaven, and more and more territory was lost.

== Siege ==
By May 1428, Philip the Good had recruited a huge Burgundian army of 20.000 men and raised the siege of Gouda. Gouda was surrounded on three sides, only the river side remained under control of the fleet of Willem van Brederode. Jacqueline sent messengers to her allies Jan van Montfoort and Bishop of Utrecht Rudolf van Diepholt, but no help arrived. She could also not count on her English husband Humphrey, Duke of Gloucester, who had their marriage annulled.

After six weeks, and with no help on its way, Jacqueline had no choice but to surrender. She concluded the Treaty of Delft with Philip the Good of Burgundy on 3 July 1428. By this treaty, hostilities came to an end, Jacqueline retained her titles of Countess of Holland, Zeeland and Hainaut, but she recognized Philip as her heir and regent of her counties.

== Sources ==
- J. A. M. Y. Bos-Rops, 1993, Graven op zoek naar geld: de inkomsten van de graven van Holland.
- Hanno Brand, Over macht en overwicht: stedelijke elites in Leiden.
- Hans van Woerkom, biografie over Jacoba van Beieren
