= Reinoud I van Brederode =

6th Lord of Brederode

Reinoud I van Brederode (English: Raynald) (Santpoort, 1336–1390) was the 6th Lord of Brederode.

== Life ==
He was a son of Dirk III van Brederode and Beatrix van Heinsberg van Valkenberg. In 1358, Reinoud was appointed bailiff of Kennemerland by Albert I, count of Holland. In the same year, an assassination attempt was made on him at Castricumerzand. On 11 November 1377, he succeeded his father as Lord of Brederode. Reinoud supported Machteld of Guelders in her struggle for the county of Guelders from 1371 to 1379.

== Family ==
In 1366, Reinoud married Jolanda van Gennep van der Eem, a daughter of Jan II van Gennep. They had at least four children:

- Dirk or Diederik (1370–1415), who decided to enter a monastic life in 1390, upon which his titles went to his brothers. He spent his life in a Carthusian monastery near Arnhem.
- Jan I van Brederode (1370/72–1415), 7th Lord of Brederode, married Johanna van Abcoude. They both entered a monastic life in 1402, causing his younger brother to inherit the title of van Brederode.
- Walraven I van Brederode (1370/73–1417), 8th Lord of Brederode, succeeded his older brother when he entered a monastic life.
- William van Brederode, an admiral who offered his services mostly to the Hook faction.

Preceded by Dirk III van Brederode	Lord of Brederode; 1377–1390	Succeeded by Jan I van Brederode
