= Nicolas Perrenot de Granvelle =

French diplomat (1486–1550)

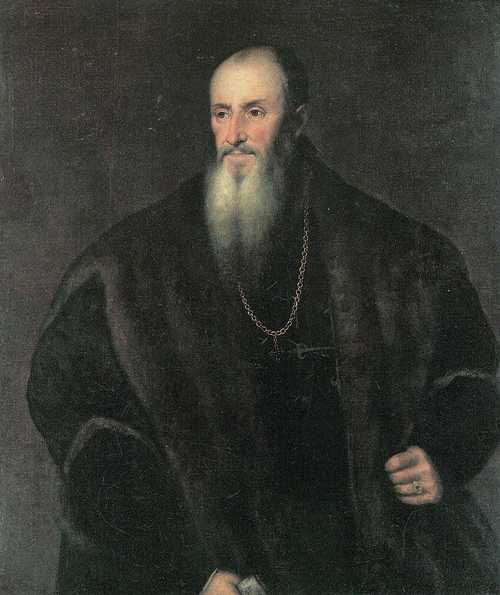
Nicolas Granvelle, Portrait by Titian

Nicolas Perrenot de Granvelle (Ornans, 1486 – Augsburg, 1550) was a Burgundian politician who served as a close trusted adviser to Emperor Charles V. He was made suzerain of the imperial city of Besançon and held an influential position in the Netherlands. From 1530 until his death he was one of the emperor's most trusted advisers in Germany. He was the father of the cardinal and politician Antoine Perrenot de Granvelle, also a leading Habsburg minister, and built the Palace Granvelle in Besançon.

== Life ==
In 1518 he became a lawyer and was called at the age of 34 years to the Parlement of Dole.

In 1519 Charles V was elected emperor at the age of 19 years. Nicolas Perrenot de Granvelle quickly became a closely trusted advisor and was appointed chancellor of the empire. His sons and sons-in-law (Granvelle family) went on to occupy prominent positions at the imperial court.

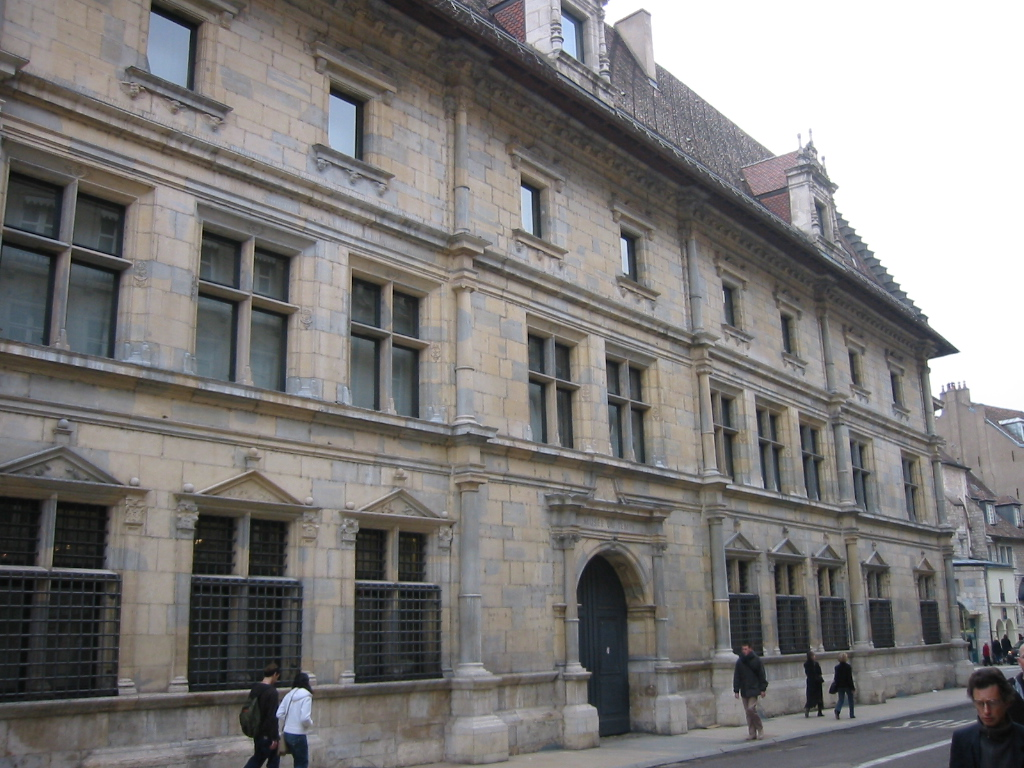
Palais Grandvelle, Besançon, completed 1550, now the Musée du Temps

In 1527 he bought the seigniory of Grandvelle, located in the Bailiwick of Amont (Bailliage d'Amont), administrative territory located in present-day Haute-Saône department, which later became better known under the name of Granvelle. In 1530, after the death of Mercurino Gattinara, he became one of the emperor's most trusted advisers in the Holy Roman Empire, and played that role until his death.

He died on August 27, 1550, at the age of 64 years, while attending the Imperial Diet in Augsburg. He owned a significant art collection and library, the latter now in the Bibliothèque municipale de Besançon.

== Succession ==
In 1513, he married Nicole de Bonvalot daughter of Jacques de Bonvalot, lord of Champagney. The couple had 15 children, four of whom went on to play prominent political roles.

- Antoine Perrenot de Granvelle (1517-1586), the eldest surviving son, became Archbishop of Mechelen and a cardinal as well as serving as a diplomat and adviser to Charles V.
- Thomas Perrenot de Granvelle (1521-1571), Spanish Ambassador in London, Paris and Vienna.
- Jérôme de Perrenot (1524-1554), became a diplomat in the service of Ferdinand I, Holy Roman Emperor and guardian of the young William the Silent.
- Frédéric Perrenot de Champagney (1536-1602), served the Habsburgs as a soldier and diplomat.

From modest beginnings in the Franche-Comté, the Perrenot family in two generations became the most powerful and the richest in the region. The Granvelle Palace in Besançon is the symbol of their rapid success and social ascent.
