= Reinoud II van Brederode =

Dutch nobleman (1415–1473)

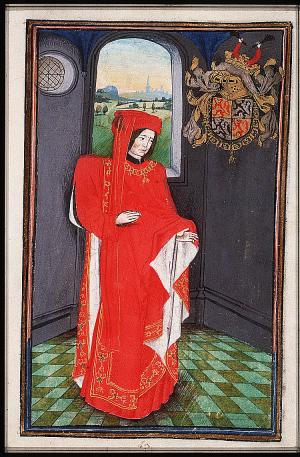
9th Lord of Brederode

Reinoud II van Brederode (Santpoort, 1415 – Vianen, 16 October 1473) was Lord of Vianen, Ameide, Lexmond, Hei- en Boeicop, Meerkerk, Tienhoven and Twaalfhoven.

Brederode coat of arms

== Life ==
He was the son of Walraven I van Brederode and Johanna van Vianen. His uncle William van Brederode ruled as regent during his minority until 1438, when Reinoud was officially named Lord. In 1445 he was made a knight of the Order of the Golden Fleece and was also appointed burgrave of Utrecht. Reinoud came to his brother Gijsbrecht van Brederode's aid in the bishop's dispute with David of Burgundy, who however managed to capture Reinoud in 1470, and had him tortured. Charles the Bold set him free, but the captivity and torture had taken its toll on Reinoud, who would never be the same.

== Family ==
Reinoud married with Elisabeth, or Lijsbeth Willems in 1440. He had many children with Elisabeth, but the marriage was not recognised and the children were given bastard status. Around 1458, Reinoud married Yolande de Lalaing, a daughter of William de Lalaing.

Reinoud had the following children with Elisabeth, his first wife:

- Walraven van Brederode ± 1440–????
- Reinier van Brederode ± 1444–± 1481
- Hendrik van Brederode ± 1447–????
- Johan van Brederode ± 1450–????
- Johan van Brederode ± 1452–????
- Johanna van Brederode ± 1455–????
- Joost van Brederode ± 1457–????

Reinoud had the following children with Yolanda, his second wife:

- Josina van Brederode ± 1458–????
- Johanna van Brederode ± 1459–????
- Walravina van Brederode ± 1460–± 1500
- Anna van Brederode ± 1461–????
- Walraven II van Brederode 1462–1531, successor
- Frans van Brederode 1465–± 1490
- Yolande van Brederode ± 1467–????

Preceded by Walraven I van Brederode	Lord of Brederode; 1417–1473	Succeeded by Walraven II van Brederode
