= Reinoud III van Brederode =

Dutch nobleman (1492–1556)

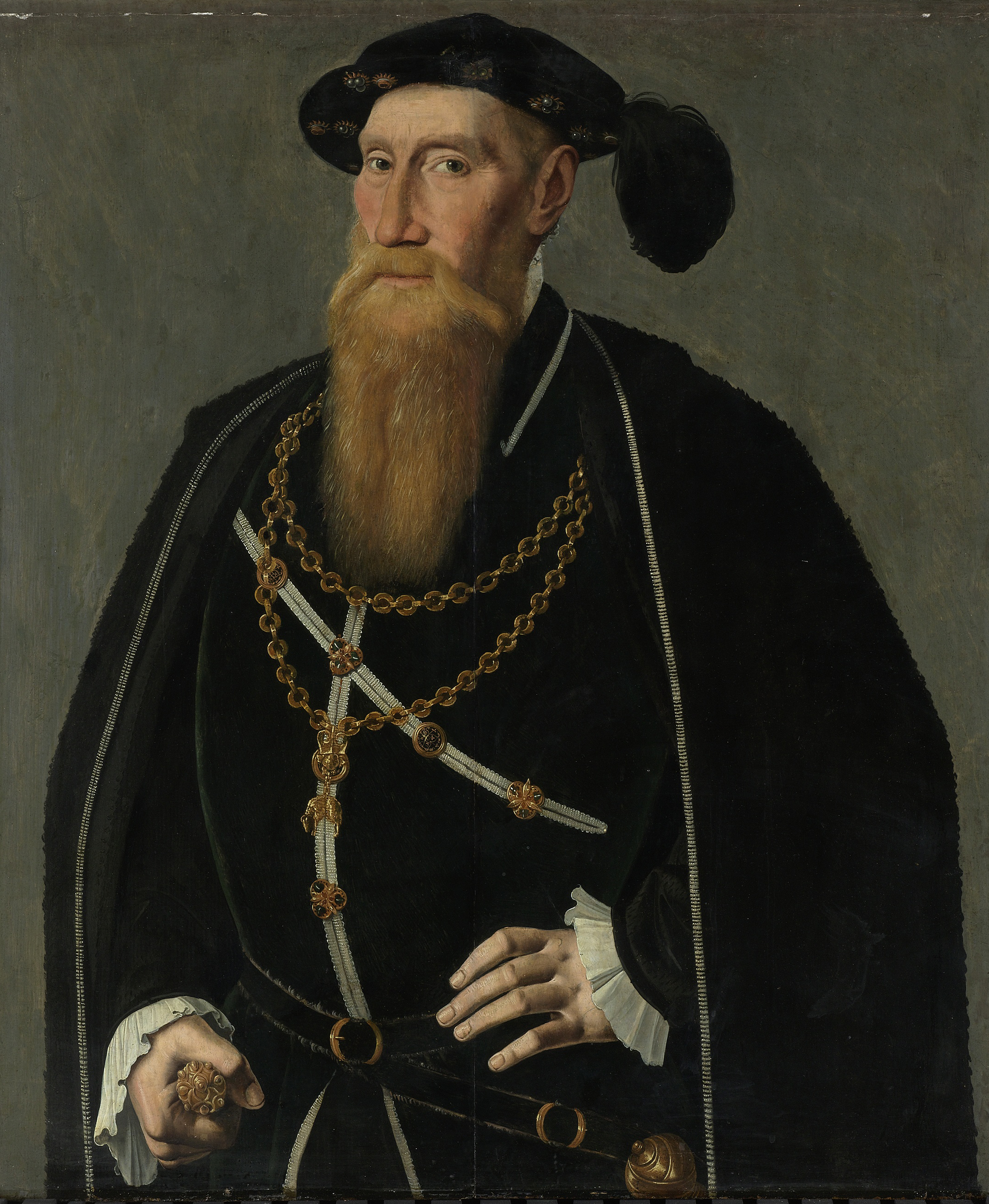
Reinoud III van Brederode with his Order of the Golden Fleece, by Jan van Scorel (circa 1545)

Reinoud III van Brederode (4 September 1492, Brederode Castle, Santpoort – 25 September 1556, in Brussels), lord of Brederode and Vianen, burgrave of Utrecht, master of the woods and master of the hunt of Holland, member of the Council of State.

Reinoud III was the father of Hendrik van Brederode. He was also member of the privy council and chamberlain to Charles V, Holy Roman Emperor. From 1531 on he resided in Castle Batenstein

He was the son of Walraven II van Brederode and Margaretha van Borselen.

As a knight of the Order of the Golden Fleece, he ruled the free lordship of Vianen and Ameide as if these were independent from the county of Holland. He had control over the judiciary and the coinage, which were prerogatives of the count of Holland, and which brought him into conflict with the count, who was worried that Reinoud might make claims to the county. For this he was sentenced to death, but the sentence was later reversed by Charles V.

In 1556 Reinoud died, and was interred in the family grave in the present day reformed church in Vianen. His wife Philippote van der Marck was also buried there in 1537.

== Offspring ==
Reinoud married in 1521 Philippote von der Marck, daughter Robert II van der Marck. They had the following children:

- Helena (1527/28 – Antwerp 1572); married (Antwerp 1549) Thomas Perrenot de Granvelle (Besançon 1521 – Antwerp 1571), son of Nicolas Perrenot de Granvelle
- Hendrik (1531 – 1568), Lord of Brederode, Vianen and Ameide
- Antonia Penelope (died after 1591); married I (1547) count Hendrik von Isenburg (died Walem (1554); married II Cornelis van Gistel (Corneille de Ghistelles)
- Franciska
- Johanna (died 1573) married (1551) Joost van Bronckhorst (died after 1598)
- Lodewijk (died Saint-Quentin 1557)
- Margaretha (died Namur (1554); married (1542) count Peter Ernst van Mansfeld-Friedeburg (1517 – 1604)
- Filips (died Milan 1554)
- Reinoud
- Robert (died in Bavaria 1566)

In addition he had several illegitimate children:

- Anna; married Gijsbert van Schoten
- Artus (died 1592); married (Haarlem 1560) Anna van der Laan
- Frans (died before 1589); married Hendrika de Wilde (1521 – 1613)
- Lancelot (died 1573)
- Lucretia (died after 1544); married (1539) Jan van Haeften (died after 1584), Lord of Gameren
- Margaretha (died 1574); married Roelof Grauwert (died Vianen 1572), Lord Weerdestein
- Sandrina (Vianen 1539 – Wijk bij Duurstede 1617); married I Albert van Presikhoven; married II Maximiliaan Wtter Leminge; married III Maximiliaan Tordesillas; married IV Maximiliaan Lignaro
- Filips (born Vianen 1541
- Sarah (Santpoort 1544 – 1631); married I (Santpoort voor 1567) Albert van Egmond-Merenstein (1540 – 1595); married II Amelis Utenengh (died 1611)
- Reinoud (Vianen 1548 – Lexmond 1633), Lord of Bolswaard; married (Vuren 1585) Josina van Arkel van Asperen (1560 – 1601)

== Gallery ==
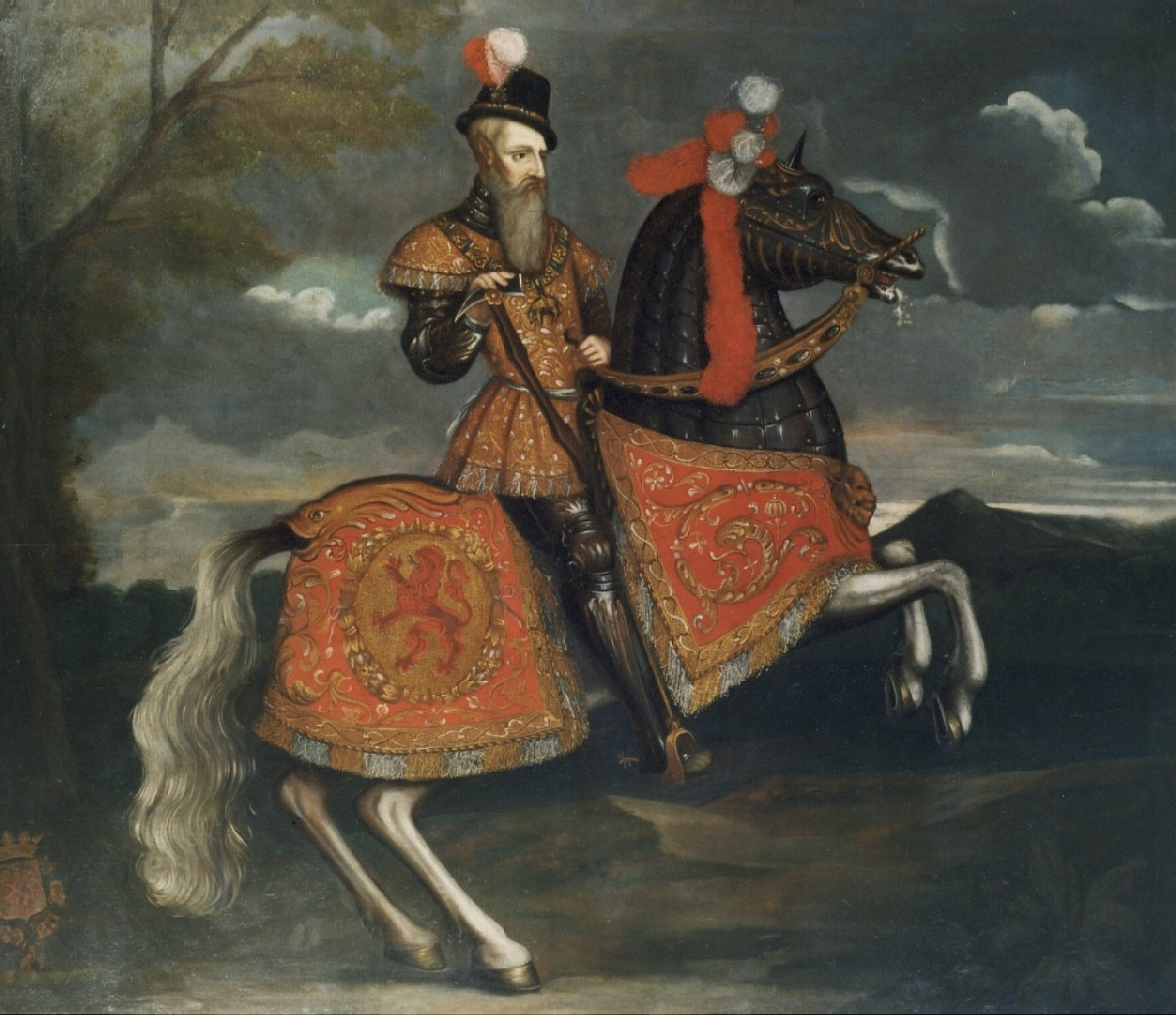
Reinoud III van Brederode on horseback by a follower of Cornelis Antonisz

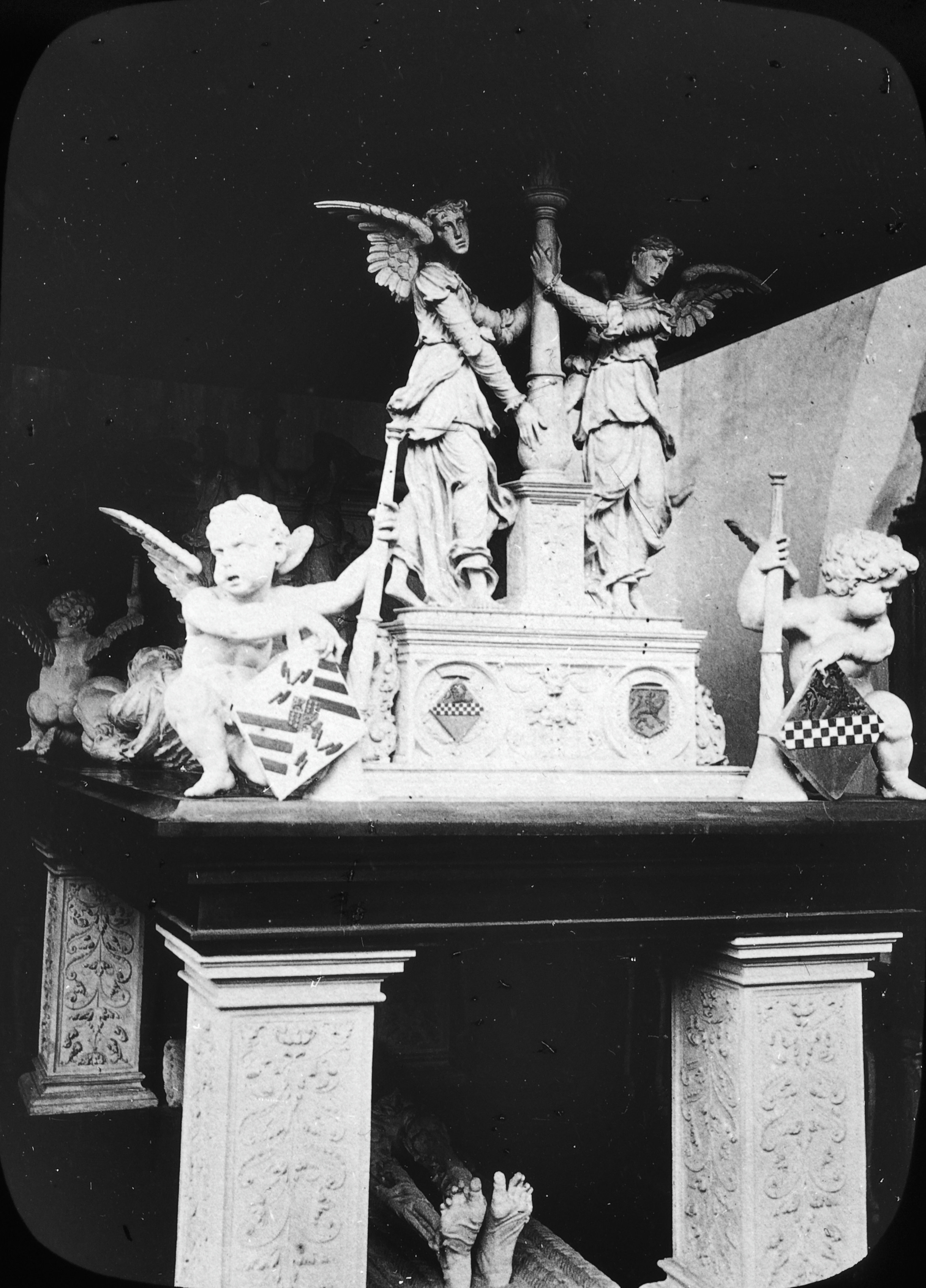
Van Brederode family grave in Vianen

Brederode coat of arms

Preceded by Walraven II van Brederode	Lord of Brederode ?–1556	Succeeded by Hendrick van Brederode
