= Jan I van Brederode =

Jan van Brederode (Santpoort, 1370/1372 – Azincourt, 25 October 1415) was Lord of Brederode and during his life lay brother and soldier.

== Life ==
Jan was the son of Reinoud I van Brederode and Jolanda van Gennep. In 1390, he succeeded his father as the 7th Lord of Brederode. Jan had an elder brother named Dirk or Diederik, who had chosen for a life in a monastery, causing all inheritance to go to Jan instead. In 1396, he campaigned against the rebellious West-Frisians together with Albert I, Duke of Bavaria, and in 1398 he made a pilgrimage to Ireland to visit the St. Patricks Fire. After his pilgrimage, Jan invested a lot of money in founding new chapels and monasteries. In 1393, he married Johanna van Abcoude. After a childless marriage, they both decided to enter a monastery in 1402.

The heritage of Brederode, which included large debts, was given to Jan's younger brother Walraven I van Brederode. Jan entered the monastery Zeelheim in Diest as brother-abbot with the intention of putting his remaining life in the service of God. However, soon problems emerged, as his younger brother Walraven was taken captive at the Siege of Gorinchem (1402) and spent seven years in captivity, held by Jan V van Arkel, Lord of Arkel, which prevented Walraven from paying the debts that Jan had collected. In May 1407, William van Abcoude, father of Johanna van Abcoude, died. William's brother Gijsbrecht having died two years before that, the title and domains of Abcoude fell to Jacob van Gaasbeek, a nephew of the family. In the spring of 1409 Jan, with the intention of challenging Jacob van Gaasbeek's inheritance, resigned his position as lay brother so that he would be eligible for the title and domains of Abcoude, but he needed his wife for that as well. Jan, however, was unable to arrange a meeting with his wife, after which he besieged the monastery at Wijk bij Duurstede. Bishop Frederik van Blankenheim led the army of the Sticht against him and took him prisoner, after which he was handed over to Jacob van Gaasbeek. Van Brederode remained in captivity until 1412, when he travelled to France with the intention of joining the English army. Unfortunately the English commanders were aware of his past and refused his entry, after which he travelled to France and joined their army. Jan van Brederode participated in the Battle of Agincourt, where he died at the age of 44.

Preceded by Reinoud I van Brederode	Lord of Brederode; 1390–1402	Succeeded by Walraven I van Brederode
