= Overschie =

District of Rotterdam, Netherlands

Coordinates: 51°56′N 4°26′E

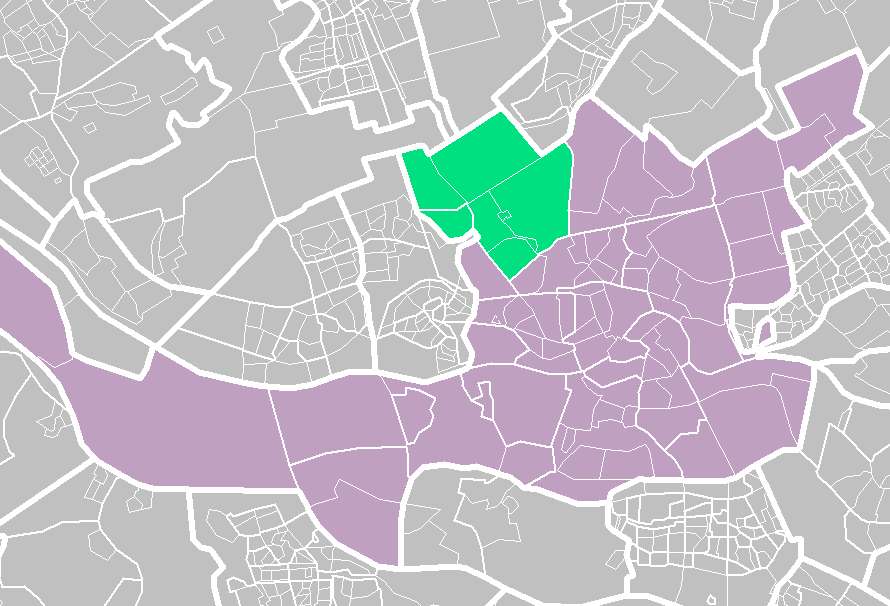
Overschie (light green) within Rotterdam (purple).

Overschie (Dutch pronunciation: [ˈoːvərˌsxi]) is a neighborhood of Rotterdam, Netherlands, formerly a separate village with its own municipality.

The village of Overschie was located on the intersection of four rivers called "Schie": the Delftse Schie, Schiedamse Schie, Delfshavense Schie, and Rotterdamse Schie. The "Schie"'s were important transport routes in the thirteenth century after the Schielands Hoge dike was constructed between Vlaardingen and Gouda, creating two ports at the Schie and the Rotte. The first became important for the development of Overschie, the second for that of Delfshaven (Delft Harbor indicates that this port was important for the city Delft). In 1340, the city of Rotterdam received permission to dig a canal between the center and Overschie: the Rotterdamse Schie.

"Overschie" is now also the name of a deelgemeente (borough) of the city of Rotterdam, covering the former village, the neighborhood Overschie, Zestienhoven (which also holds the Rotterdam The Hague Airport), and the countryside to the north including the hamlet Zweth.

== History ==
During the Hook and Cod wars, Overschie had a difficult time. It was located between Delft in Kabeljauw (Cod) and Rotterdam in Hoek (Hook) and was alternately occupied by both parties, with relatively many residents dying. The church and a number of houses that were built in 1489 were set on fire when the people of Rotterdam had to give up the village again.

In 1817 until 1941, Overschie was a separate municipality. While the places around Overschie grew, the place itself has always remained small until ultimately in August 1941 it merged with Rotterdam.

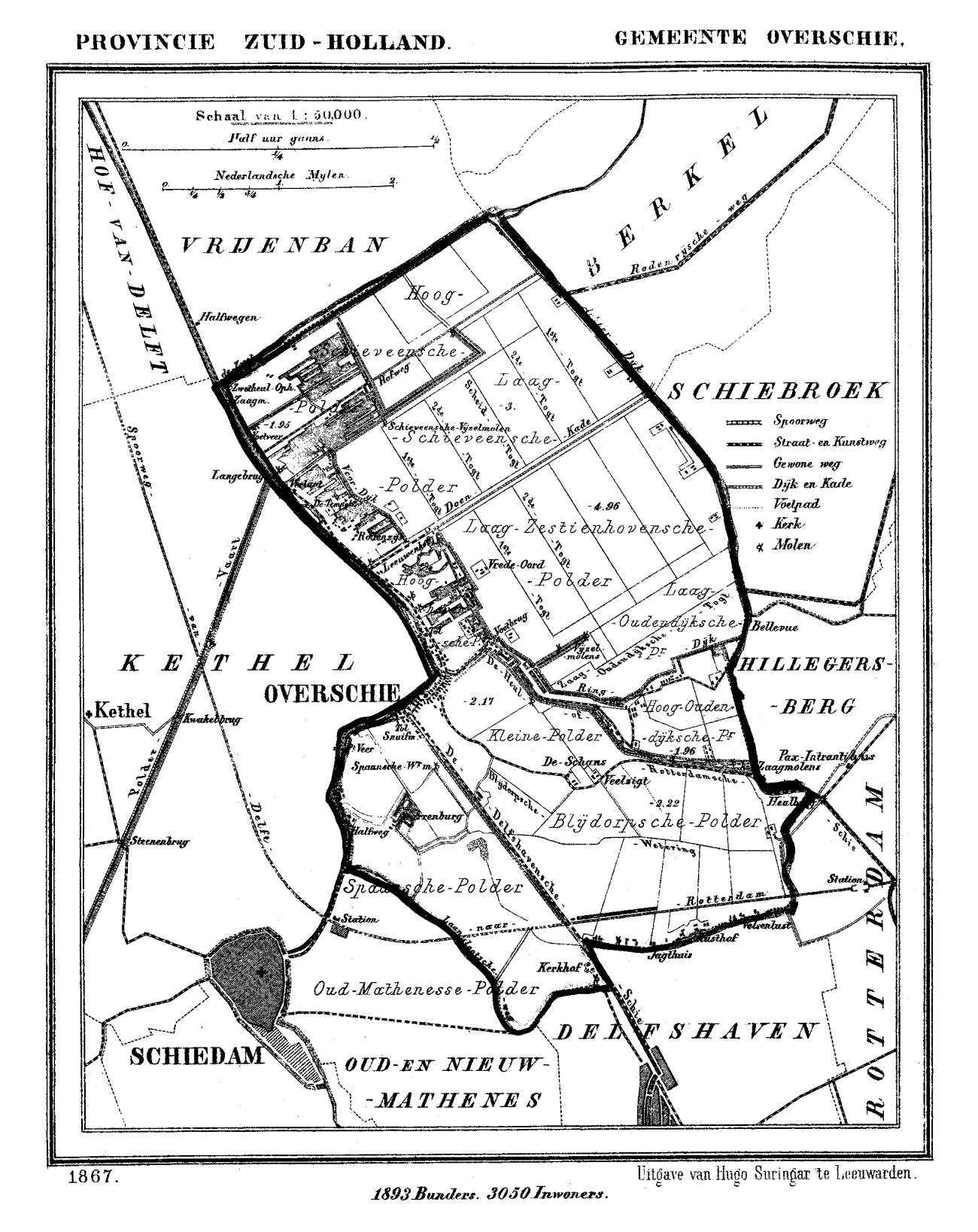
Overschie in 1867.

After World War I, Overschie expanded rapidly as a residential area, where workers in nearby industry and commuters to Rotterdam chose to live. Housing increased significantly between 1901 and 1923 from 6444 to 984 units. The first large expansion was in Schiewijk, the area between Delftweg, Zestienhovensekade, Achterdijk, and Schielaan. Private land purchases would then begin to occur. In 1927, the municipality of Overschie commissioned architect H. Sutterland Sr. to draw up a zoning plan and in 1930 he became the Director of Municipal Works.

== List of mayors ==
Served	Name
1823–1831	Johannes de Groot Stiffrij
1832–1879	Jacob Wijnaendts
1879–1884	Cornelis Jacob Anton Wijnaendts
1884–1896	Johan Hendrik Adolf de Josselin de Jong
1896–1920	Jan (J.) Bos
1920–1928	Evert Gijsbert Konings
1928–1941	Jan Cornelis Baumann

== Geography ==
The old Overschie has largely remained unchanged. The main street still goes through where the four "schies" meet and on either side are historic houses such as the old townhall "Raedthuys" (1955), the Reformed church, and the Roman Catholic church. Just outside the village lies The Tempel Estate with a Baroque garden from the eighteenth century.

As of 1 January 2025, Overschie had a population of 20,693. The district consists of the old village center, Rotterdam Road, Schiewijk (from 1922) and residential areas from the time of the post-war reconstruction. The most recently built district is Park 16Hoven. Overchie is surrounded by huge economic pillars such as the Rotterdam The Hague airport and the Spaanse Polder and Rotterdam-Noordwest. Additionally, there is a market that opens every Friday on the corner of Van Noortwijckstraat and Duyvesteynstraat since 1958.

== Neighborhoods in Overschie ==
- Kleinpolder-West
- Kleinpolder-East
- Landzicht
- Zweth
- Kandelaar
- Zestienhoven

== Born in Overschie ==
- Luitzen Egbertus Jan Brouwer (1881–1966), mathematician and philosophe
- Jean Schalekamp (1926–2015), writer and literary translator
- Friso Meeter (1936–2025), lawyer and politician
- René van Nie (1939–2017), filmmaker, columnist, screenwriter
- Jules Deelder (1944–2019), poet, performance artist, performer and writer

== Interesting facts ==
In the early 1990s, a family feud raged in Overschie that regularly made national news. In 2009 made Peter R. de Vries a report about this called "The war in Overschie".
