= William van Brederode (admiral) =

Dutch noble (1380–1451)

Willem van Brederode (1380 – France 1451) was an admiral-captain and an important partisan of the Hook faction during the Hook and Cod wars.

He was the son of Reinoud I van Brederode and Jolanda van Gennep van der Eem. William was knighted in 1402 by William VI, count of Holland. William was strongly aligned with the Hook faction and supported Jacqueline of Bavaria in her claims on the inheritance of Holland and Zeeland, and he was present at the siege of Haarlem as commander of the fleet situated along the Spaarne river. He lost the naval battle of Wieringen, but managed to secure his freedom through his noble status. He again supported Jacqueline during the siege of Gouda, but this battle was also lost. William died at the age of 71 in France.

William van Brederode married Margaretha van Merwede and Stein, but their marriage remained childless.
