= Schie =

Schie Delftse Schie, Delfshavense Schie, Rotterdamse Schie, Schiedamse Schie
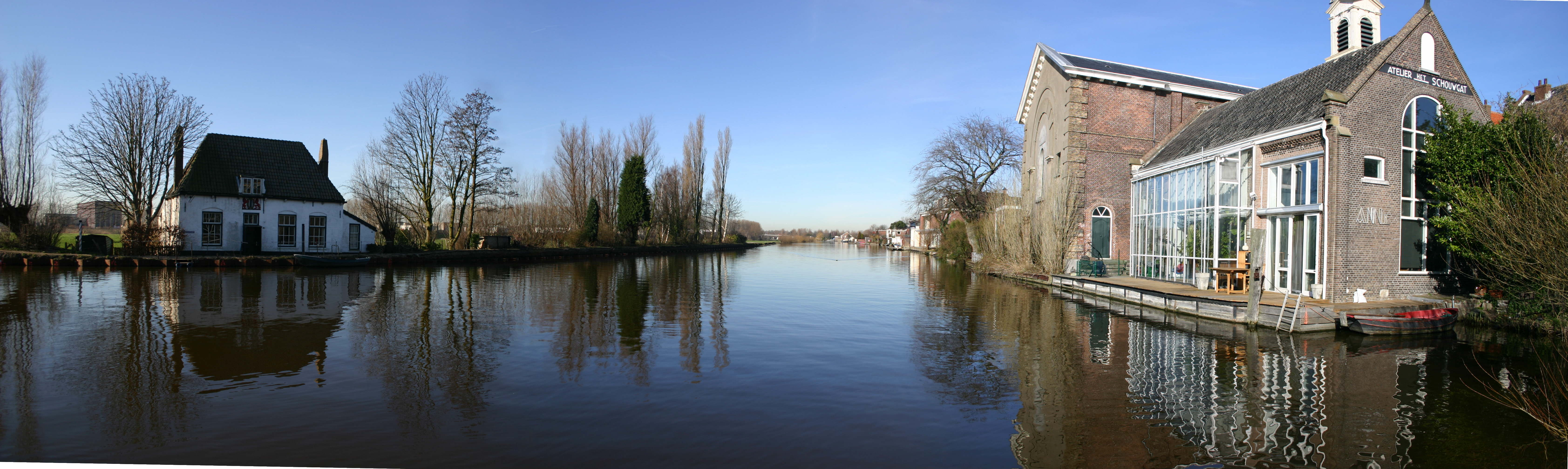
- Delftse Schie in Overschie, the Rotterdamse Schie is on the right, in front of the building, and the Schiedamse Schie is behind the photograph

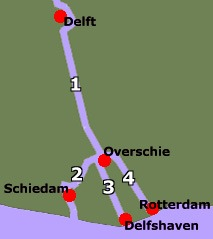
- Schematic map of the 4 Schies: 1. Delftse Schie; 2. Schiedamse Schie; 3. Delfshavense Schie; 4. Rotterdamse Schie

Location
- Country: Netherlands
- Province: South Holland

Physical characteristics
- Source: Vliet
  - location: Delft
  - coordinates: 52°00′20″N 4°21′40″E
- Mouth: Nieuwe Maas
  - location: Delfshaven
  - coordinates: 51°54′23″N 4°27′50″E
- Length: 14 km (8.7 mi)from Delft to mouth at Delfshaven

Schie (Dutch pronunciation: [sxi]) the name for four waterways in the area of Overschie, South Holland, the Netherlands. There are the Delftse Schie, the Delfshavense Schie, the Rotterdamse Schie and the Schiedamse Schie. The existence of these four streams is the result of medieval rivalry among the cities of Delft, Rotterdam, and Schiedam for toll rights.

== History ==
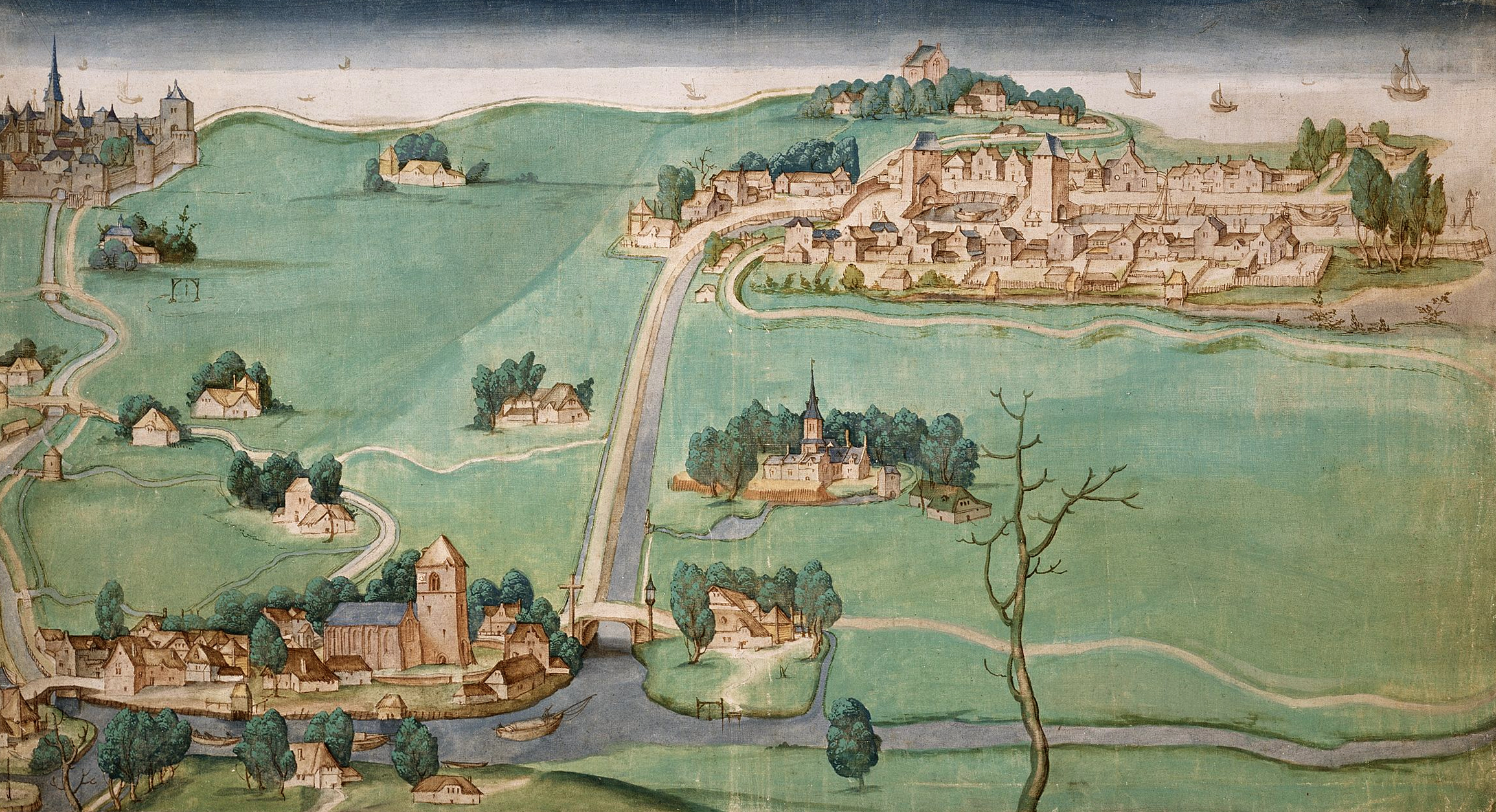
Overschie (foreground), Rotterdam (top left), and Delfshaven (top right). Schiedam would be located to the right out of view. (Image from 1512.)

The original Schie was a swampy creek in the area of Schiebroek that flowed into the former Merwede at the current town of Overschie. The city of Delft formed along this stream and gave it the name Delf, meaning "dig", indicating that this stream was at least partially dug out. The first excavations may have taken place back in Roman times, when the nearby Corbulo Canal also was dug.

In 1150, the Schielands High Seawall was built along the Merwede. When the outlying floodplains were made into polders afterwards, the Schie was extended southward and a dam was built at the new mouth. The settlement that formed there was named Schiedam, and became an important city since it levied toll on the ships that sailed on the Schie to Delft and beyond.

In 1280, the Poldervaart was built to drain the eastern amts of Delfland. This canal had a direct connection to the Merwede outside Schiedam. Political rivalry among the various landlords and the cities of Schiedam, Delft, and Rotterdam led to the construction of a new canal between Overschie and Rotterdam in 1343, thereby splitting the Schie at Overschie in the Rotterdamse Schie and the original Schiedamse Schie. Schiedam's control over shipping on the Schie was now lost.

In 1389, the city of Delft received permission from Duke Albert I, Count of Holland, to dig its own canal to the Merwede. The existing section from Delft to Overschie was widened, and became known as the Delftse Schie. From there a new canal was dug to the Merwede. At its mouth, Delft built its own new harbour: Delfshaven. This section was named the Delfshavense Schie.

Since 1893, the Delftse Schie, together with the Vliet, became part of the Rhine-Schie Canal that extends to Leiden.

=== 20th century ===
In 1903, a dike broke near Kandelaar, nearly draining the entire Schie into the low-lying surrounding fields.

In 1933, the Coolhaven (Cool harbor) was completed that provided a new and better connection between the Delfshavense Schie and the Nieuwe Maas, reducing the shipping on the other Schie canals.

After the bombardment of Rotterdam at the beginning of World War II, the rubble of the ruined city was used to backfill the Rotterdamse Schie. Only a small section at Overschie remains of the Rotterdamse Schie.

In 1989, the Delftse Schie between Delft and Rotterdam was transferred from municipal to provincial jurisdiction.

== Current situation ==
The Delfshavense Schie is now the main shipping connection between the Delftse Schie and Nieuwe Maas. Furthermore, it is also used for water management. On the other hand, the Rotterdamse Schie is mostly infilled and the Schiedamse Schie is little used for boating.
