= Ameide =

Coordinates: 51°57′N 4°58′E

- Flag Coat of arms

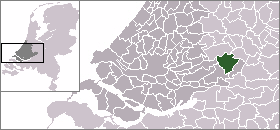

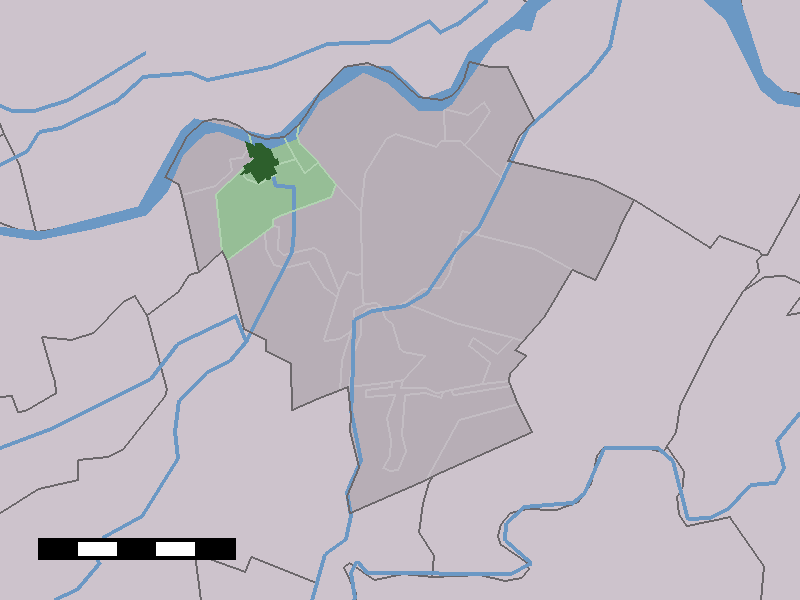
- The village centre (dark green) and the statistical district (light green) of Ameide in the former municipality of Zederik.
- Country: Netherlands
- Province: Utrecht
- Municipality: Vijfheerenlanden

Population
  - Total: ca. 3,000
- Postcode: 4233, 4235
- Area code: 0183

Ameide is a city in the Dutch province of Utrecht. It is a part of the municipality of Vijfheerenlanden, and lies about 9 km southwest of IJsselstein.

Ameide received city rights in the 14th century.

Ameide was a separate municipality in the province of South Holland until 1986, when it became part of Zederik. When Zederik merged into the new municipality Vijfheerenlanden in 2019, it became a part of the province of Utrecht.

In 2001, the village of Ameide had 3087 inhabitants. The built-up area of the village was 0.58 km^{2}, and contained 1083 residences. The statistical area "Ameide", which also can include the surrounding countryside, has a population of around 3040.

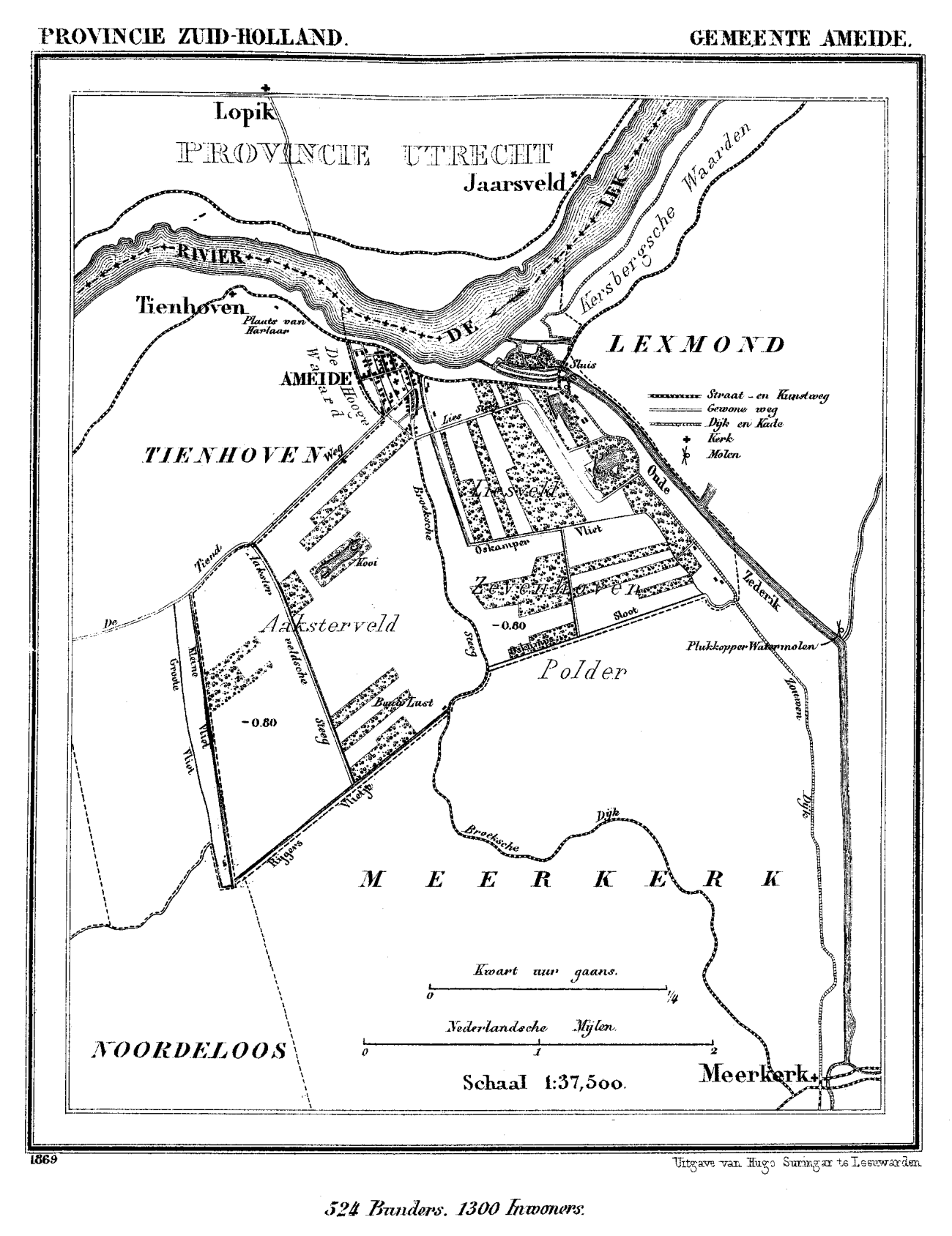
Map of the municipality in 1869
