= Duin en Kruidberg =

Stately home in Santpoort, Haarlem, the Netherlands

Coordinates: 52°26′03″N 4°37′32″E

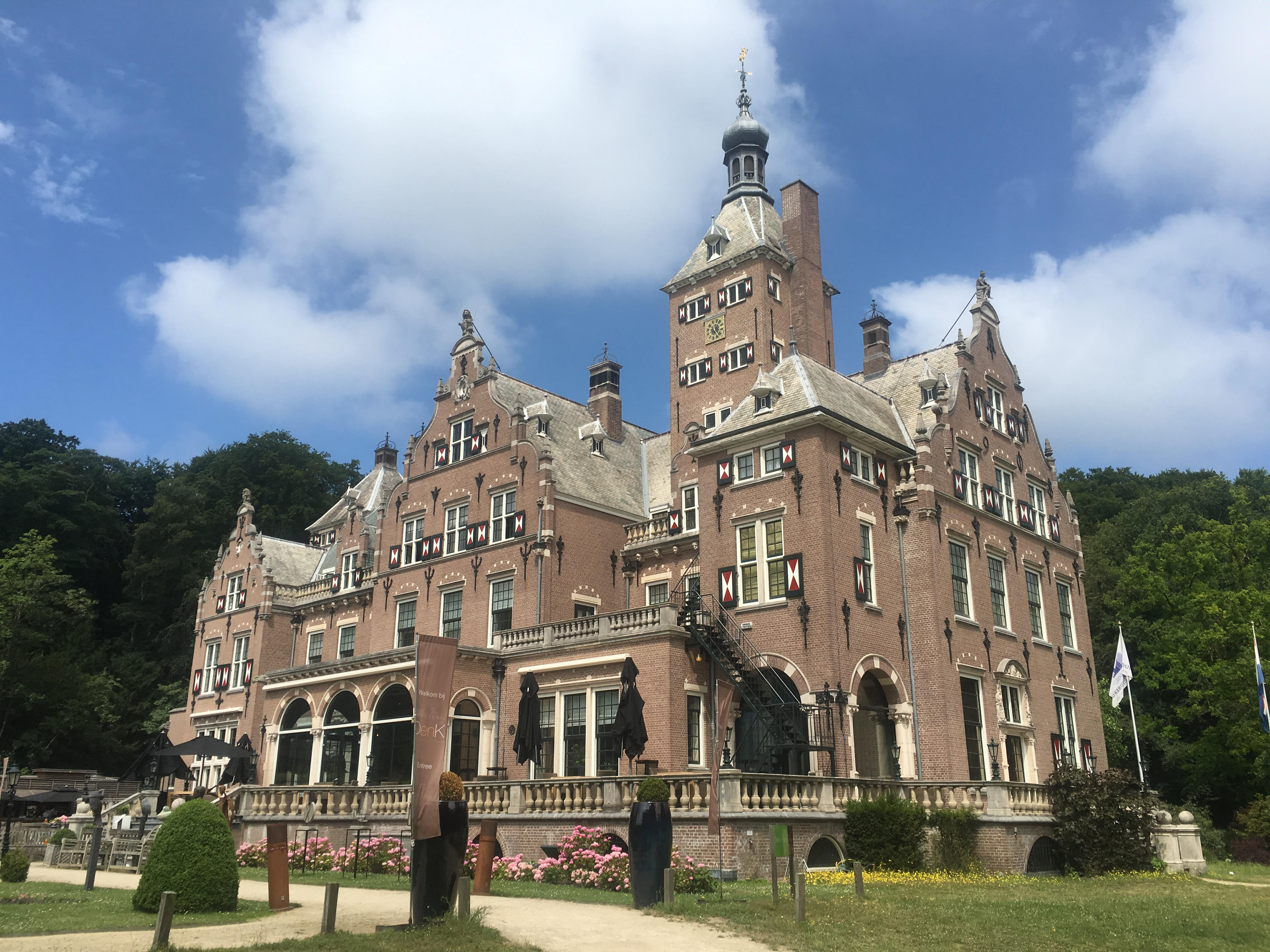
Duin en Kruidberg. The design of the large tower was inspired by the tower of the now lost Zuylestein Castle

Duin en Kruidberg is a stately home in Santpoort, near Haarlem, the Netherlands. Kruidberg started as a summer house for rich merchants from Amsterdam, then it became a hunting lodge of the prince of Orange, the future king-stadholder, William III (1650–1702). The plans for the Dutch invasion of England were drawn up here, which culminated in the Glorious Revolution of 1688. The estate merged with neighbouring Duin en Berg into Duin en Kruidberg in the 19th century. The current house was constructed by Jacob Theodoor Cremer around 1900 in Dutch Renaissance Revival architecture. The Cremers hosted royalty at the house and held hunting events as well. It was and is one of the largest country houses in the Netherlands. After the Second World War, it became a holiday resort for the employees of a large Dutch bank, ABN AMRO. Later, it was opened to the general public as well.

Today, the country house is a hotel restaurant. Most of the surrounding estate is owned by Vereniging Natuurmonumenten and is open for the general public.

== History ==
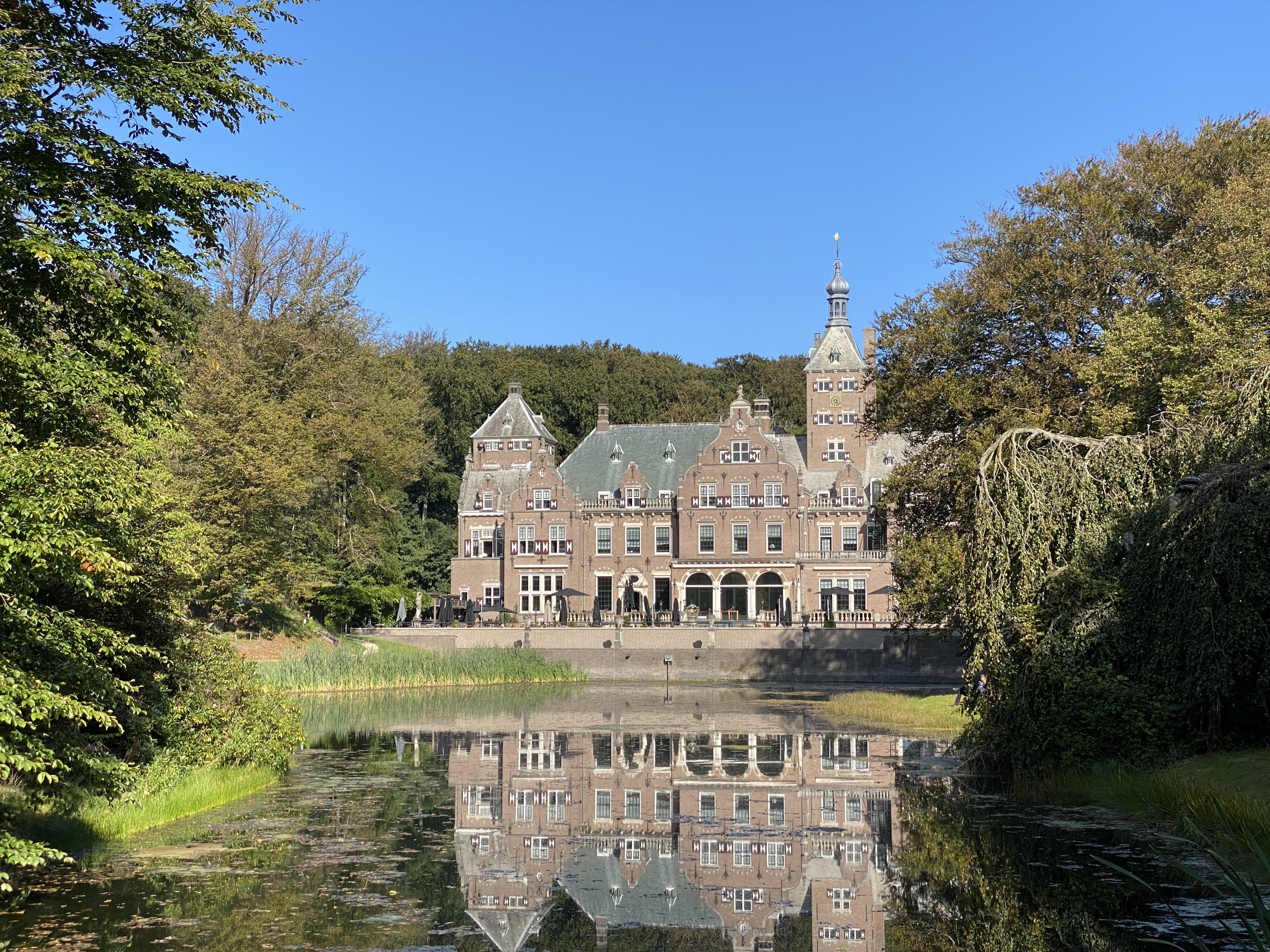
Duin en Kruidberg seen from the garden

At the start of the 17th century, rich merchants from Amsterdam started to acquire estates in the countryside around the city. The merchants and their families would spend the summer there, relaxing, gardening and hunting - copying the aristocratic lifestyle. It became fashionable to have a house along the Vecht or the Amstel, or in Kennemerland, the area around Haarlem. South Kennemerland was easy to reach from Amsterdam, by boat or horse, and the countryside was attractive, partly due to the raw landscape of the dunes. Between Heemskerk and Beverwijk in the north and Vogelenzang in the south, an almost continuous chain arose of country houses and stately homes with extensive gardens. The area obtained the nickname ‘’Victorious Kennemerland’’. Most of these country houses are now lost, but some are still there.

Both Duin and Berg, and Kruidberg, the predecessors of the current house, belonged to these estates founded by rich Amsterdam merchants.

=== Duin en berg ===
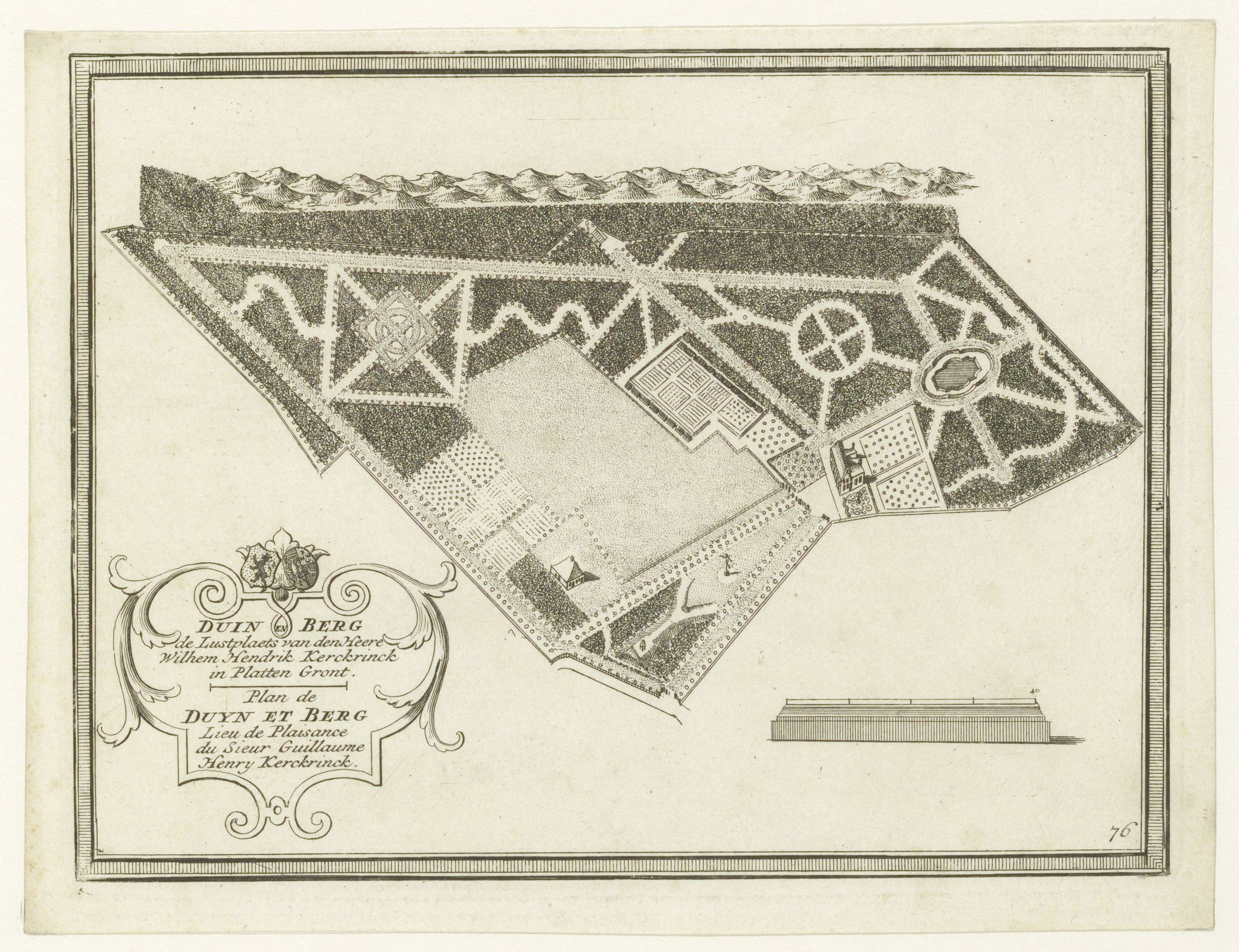
17th century map of Duin en Berg showing the house and the formal gardens

Duin en Berg was mentioned for the first time in 1598, when Steffen Cornelis Rijcken sold the estate to Aerndt Hendrich and Pieter van Dael. During the 17th and 18th century, the estate changed hands multiple times, either through inheritance or being sold to another merchants. One of them was Hendrik Reijnst, a merchant and Amsterdam magistrate, who was director of the Dutch East India Company and official of the Bank of Amsterdam. In course of time, he and his successors refurbished and extended the simple house at the estate was to meet the latest trends and requirements. From inventories, it is known that the house was richly furnished, including silk wallpaper.

Also, a French formal garden was added, including fountains, statues, and a small maze of shrubs On the top of the dunes, a viewpoint was created looking out over Santpoort and the lake behind it, the Wijkermeer. The garden also contained a folly named the Chinese tent, which shows the popularity of the Chinoiserie style in the 18th century. All the physical traces of the gardens have disappeared now.

At the end of the 18th century, around 1787, the house at Duin en Berg was demolished, probably due to financial reasons, and the estate was sold in parcels.

=== Kruidberg – The royal hunting lodge Princenbosch ===
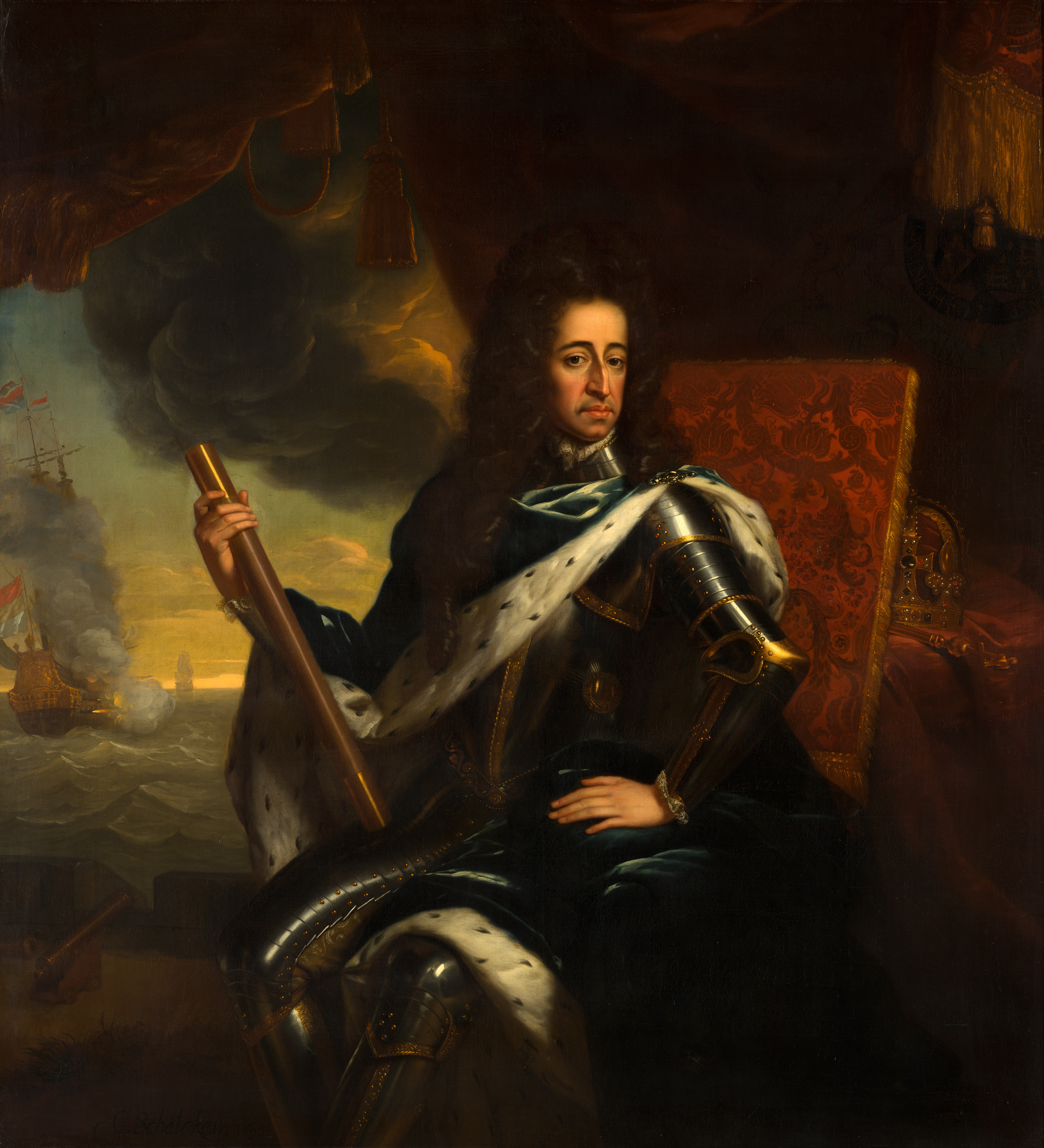
William III

The Kruidberg estate is mentioned for the first time in 1584. Balthasar Coijmans (1618–1690) acquired it in 1644. He reconstructed the house and added a formal baroque-style garden as well. It was considered one of the most beautiful houses in South Kennemerland. Also, it was one of the largest estates in that time. Sophia Trip (1614–1679), member of the wealthy Trip family, acquired it in 1677. The new owner did not enjoy it for long, as she died only three years later.

On 14 July 1682, Sophia's heirs sold Kruidberg to the Prince of Orange, William III (1650–1702), stadtholder and future King of England, Ireland, and Scotland from 1689 until his death in 1702. The name of the estate changed from Kruidberg to Princenbosch (English: "The Woods of the Prince")). He primarily used the estate as a hunting lodge, a smaller version of his Het Loo Palace near Apeldoorn, and similar to Soestdijk Palace, and Hof te Dieren.

The game-rich dunes and of south Kennemerland were attractive to William III, who loved hunting. Up to 1679, the right to hunt was with the Van Brederode family, who owned nearby Brederode Castle. However, these hunting rights reverted to the States of Holland, when the last male Brederode died in 1679, which enabled William III to hunt there.

The Kruidberg/ Princenbosch house was modest, but the estate included many ancillary buildings like coach houses and orangery. Also, there was a finchery, like many houses in Kennemerland. During the spring and autumn migrations each year, thousands of birds were caught there.

In 1687 and 1688, William III used Kruidberg/ Princenbosch as location for secret meetings to discuss the Dutch invasion of England. The estate was secluded and some of its advisors had houses in Kennemerland as well. This invasion was successful, and resulted in the Glorious Revolution. In November 1688, King James II and VII (1633–1701) was deposed and replaced by his daughter Mary II (1662–1694) and her husband William III. The two ruled as joint monarchs of England, Scotland, and Ireland until Mary's death in 1694.

William III planned to construct a new hunting lodge or palace, surrounded by large water ponds. However, these plans were never realized, maybe due to his departure to England. Only the water ponds were realized. After the death of the king-stadtholder in 1702, the house fell into oblivion. Its furniture was moved to the palace in Leeuwarden, Stadhouderlijk Hof, where his heir lived, prince John William Friso of Orange (1687–1711). The house and estate was rented out.

Most of the house has been demolished in 1865. Today, only a small fragment remains of the 17th century Kruidberg house, which is now part of a riding school. It stands opposite of the entrance of the current Duin en Kruidberg house.

=== 19th century ===
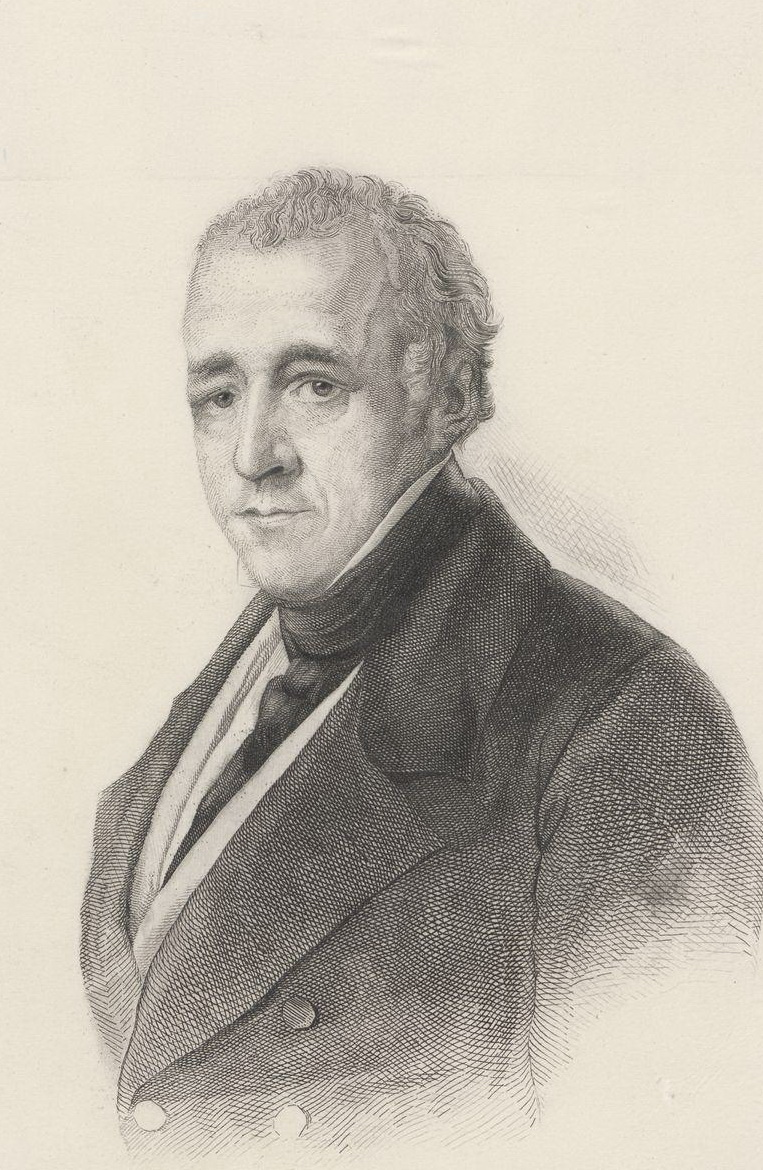
Floris Adriaan van Hall

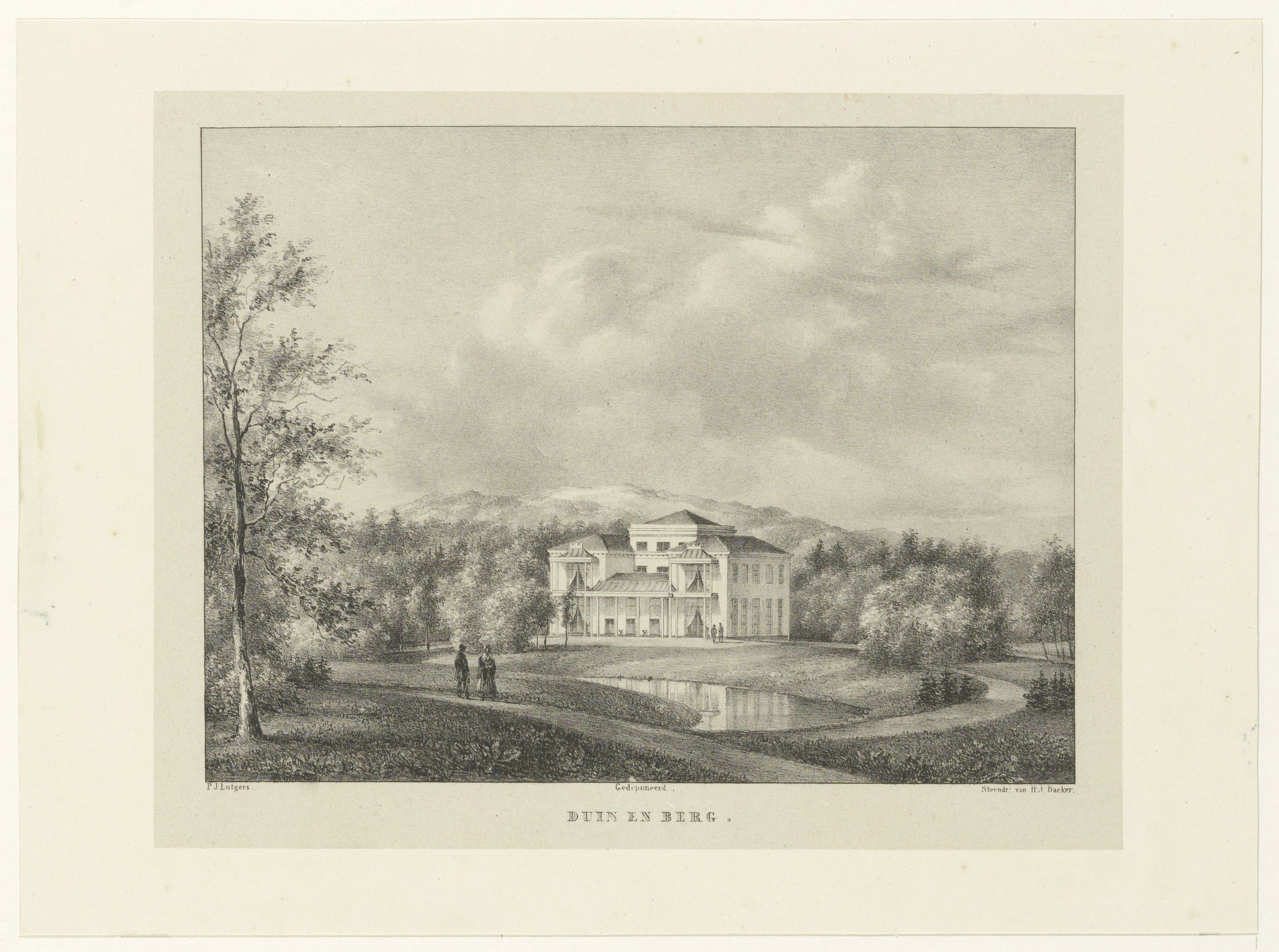
The house at Duin en Berg created by Van Hall – Engraving by Lutgers

Floris Adriaan van Hall (1791–1866) was a prominent Dutch nobleman and statesman in the 19th century. He played an important role as representative of the Amsterdam trade and banking sector, and later as politician. He served as Prime Minister of the Netherlands from 1853 to 1856, and again from 1860 to 1861. Through marriage and inheritance, he acquired Duin en Berg in the 1840s. Based on a design by an English architect, H.R. Hitchcock, he constructed a new house on the estate. Also, an English landscape garden was laid out with meandering paths, lawns and ponds. A pavilion with a view toward the pond was built on the former finchery of Duin en Berg.

Van Hall also expanded the Duin en Berg estate. In the 1850s, he acquired large parts of Kruidberg In 1858, he sold the estate to a merchant from Haarlem, Guillaume van der Hucht. For the first time, the estate was named as "Duin en Kruidberg". The Kruidberg house itself was not part of the transaction, and was sold separately. Van der Hucht enlarged the Duin en Berg house in the 1870s.

In 1895 the estate was purchased by Jacob Theodoor Cremer (1847–1923). Cremer also officially named the estate "Duin en Kruidberg".

=== Jacob Theodoor Cremer ===
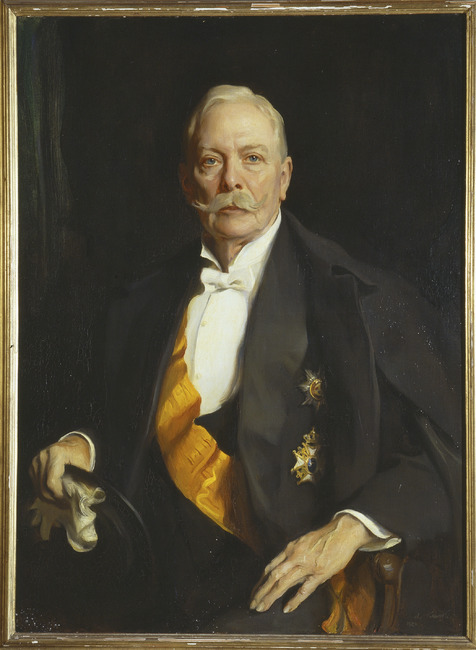
Jacob Theodoor Cremer

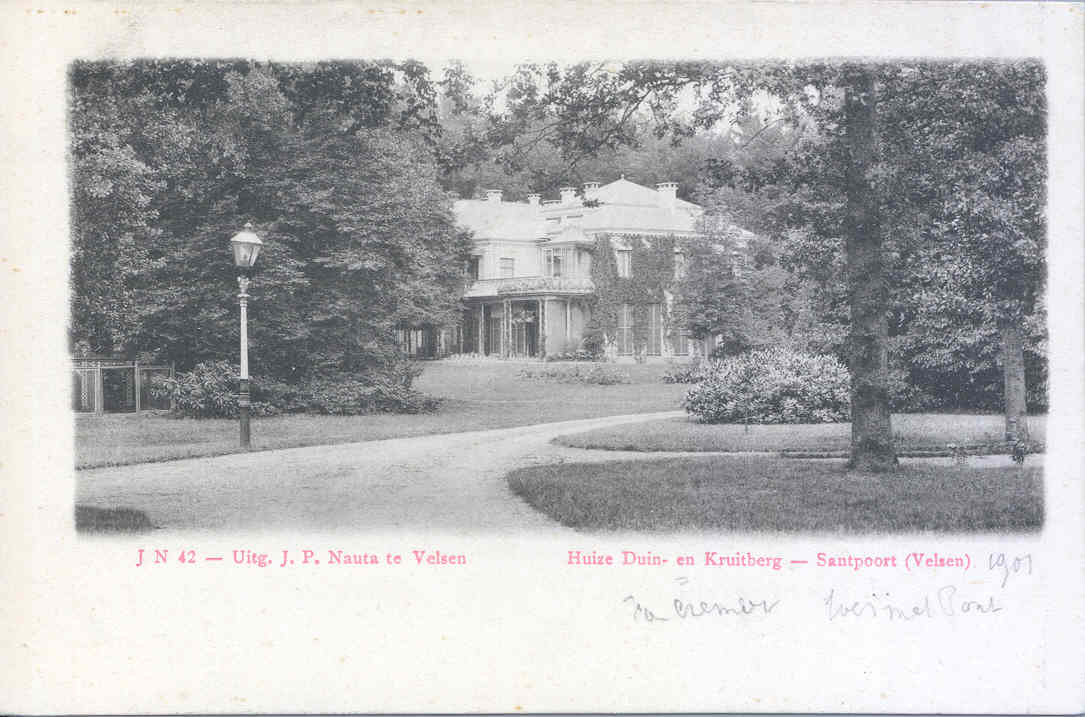
Duin en Berg

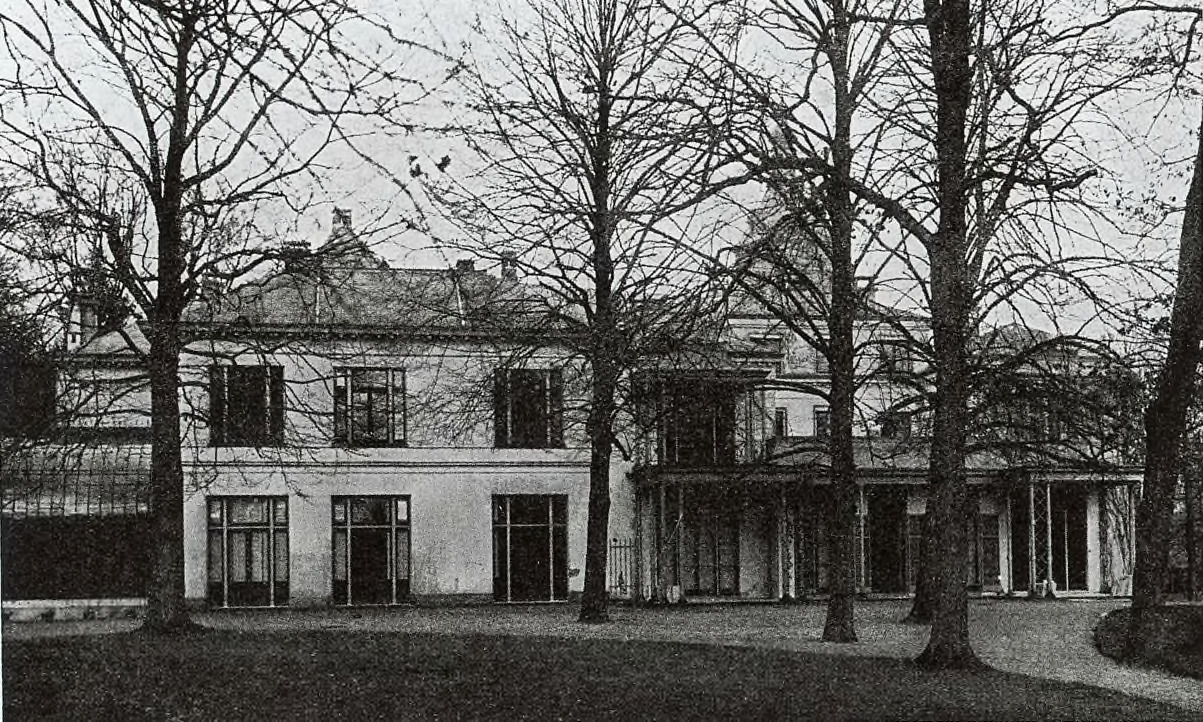
Duin en Berg after the extensions by Jacob Theodoor Cremer

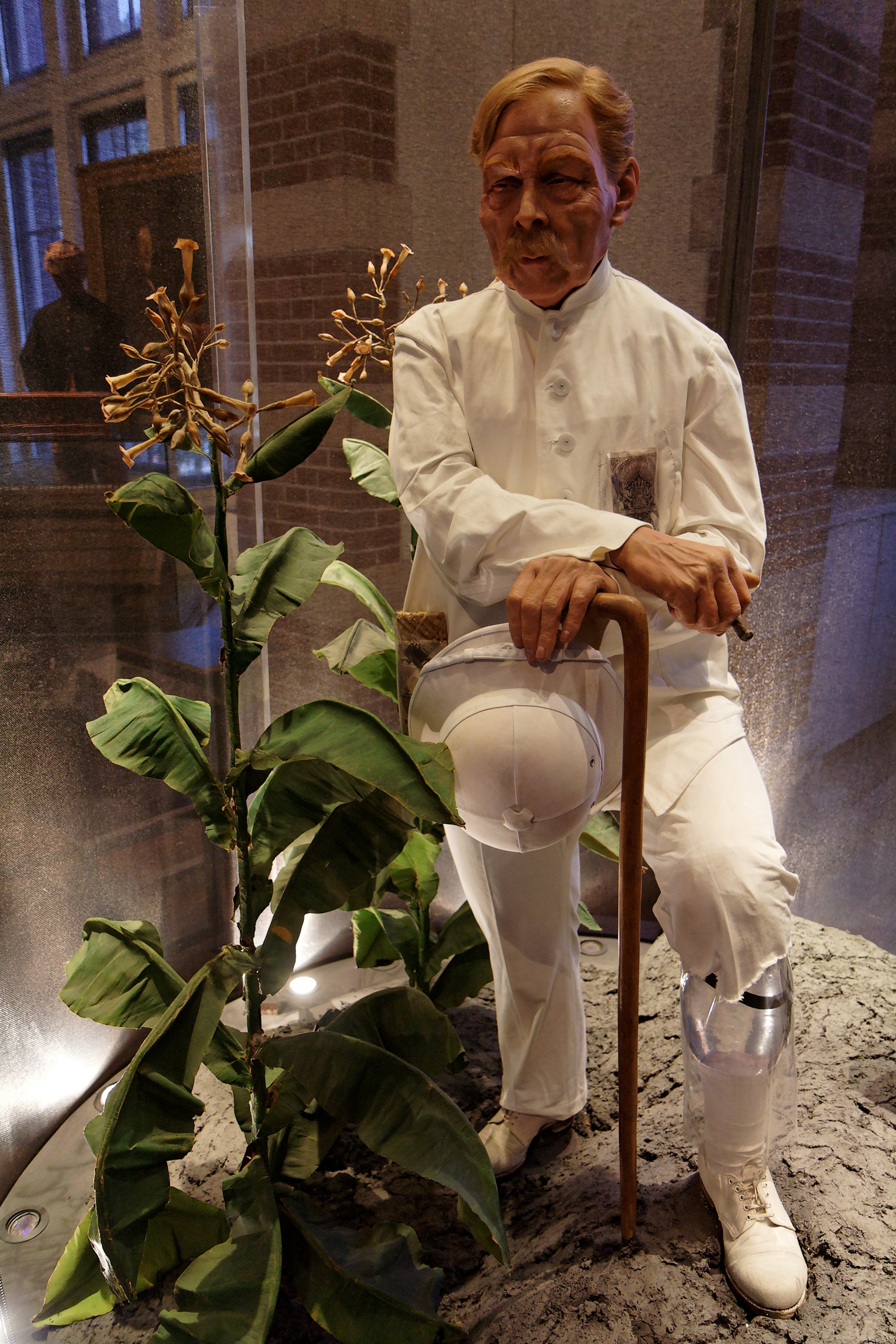
Jacob Theodoor Cremer as plantation owner in the Wereldmuseum Amsterdam

Jacob Theodoor Cremer, born in Zwolle, moved to the Dutch East Indies in 1868. He started at the Netherlands Trading Society (Dutch: Nederlandsche Handel-Maatschappij N.V. or NHM) in Batavia (Jakarta), a forerunner of ABN AMRO. Later he moved into the tobacco cultivation in Sumatra, contributing significantly to the growth of Deli Company (Dutch: Deli Maatschappij) and becoming a prominent figure in the industry.

After amassing his fortune, Cremer returned to the Netherlands in the early 1880s and remained active, entering Dutch politics and becoming the Minister of the Colonies. He was instrumental in founding Werkspoor, a factory producing railway materials, and the Colonial Institute (now the Wereldmuseum Amsterdam, formerly known as the Museum of the Tropics (Dutch: Tropenmuseum)). In 1888, he helped establish the Koninklijke Paketvaart-Maatschappij (English: Royal Packet Navigation Company), a shipping company for the East Indies route. And he was involved in the founding of the Nederlandsche Scheepsbouw Maatschappij or NSM (English: Dutch Shipbuilding Company).

In 1907, Queen Wilhelmina of the Netherlands (1880–1962) appointed him president of NHM, a role he held until 1912. Towards the end of his career, Cremer served as the Dutch ambassador to Washington, tasked with improving Dutch-US relations post the First World War.

Jacob Theodoor Cremer acquired Duin en Kruidberg to escape from his busy life. He enjoyed the dunes, managed the estate, and cultivated tobacco in a glasshouse. Despite this retreat, he remained active, hosting numerous social events, including hunting parties, theatrical and musical performances, and receptions. The estate was frequented by guests, including royalty and notable figures such as Anthony Fokker, who experimented with car tyres there alongside Cremer's son Frits.

Cremer and his wife, Annie Hermine Hogan, were known for their extravagant parties, making the estate a renowned social hub. To facilitate guest visits, Cremer funded the construction of a station in Santpoort, even arranging for special trains on significant occasions. Due to the inadequacies of Van Hall's house, Cremer had it extensively remodelled by various architects (adding a new floor) before ultimately deciding to demolish and rebuild it entirely in 1907.

=== Building a new country house ===
Building of the new house

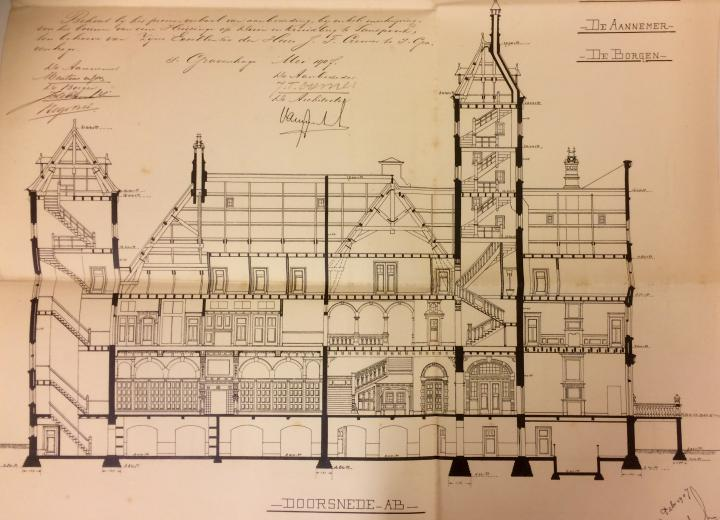
Design plan

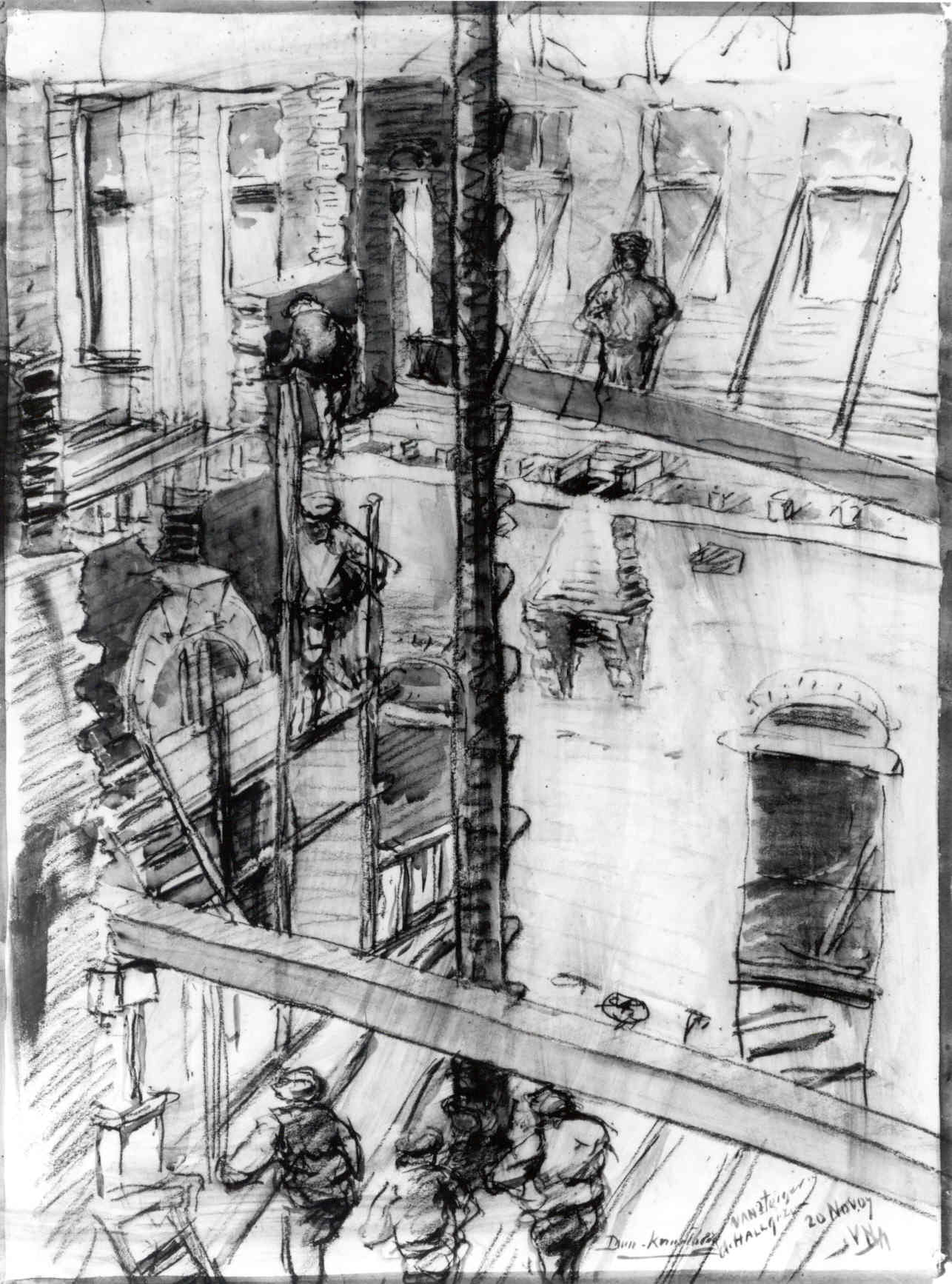
Sketch by Johannes van Nieukerken

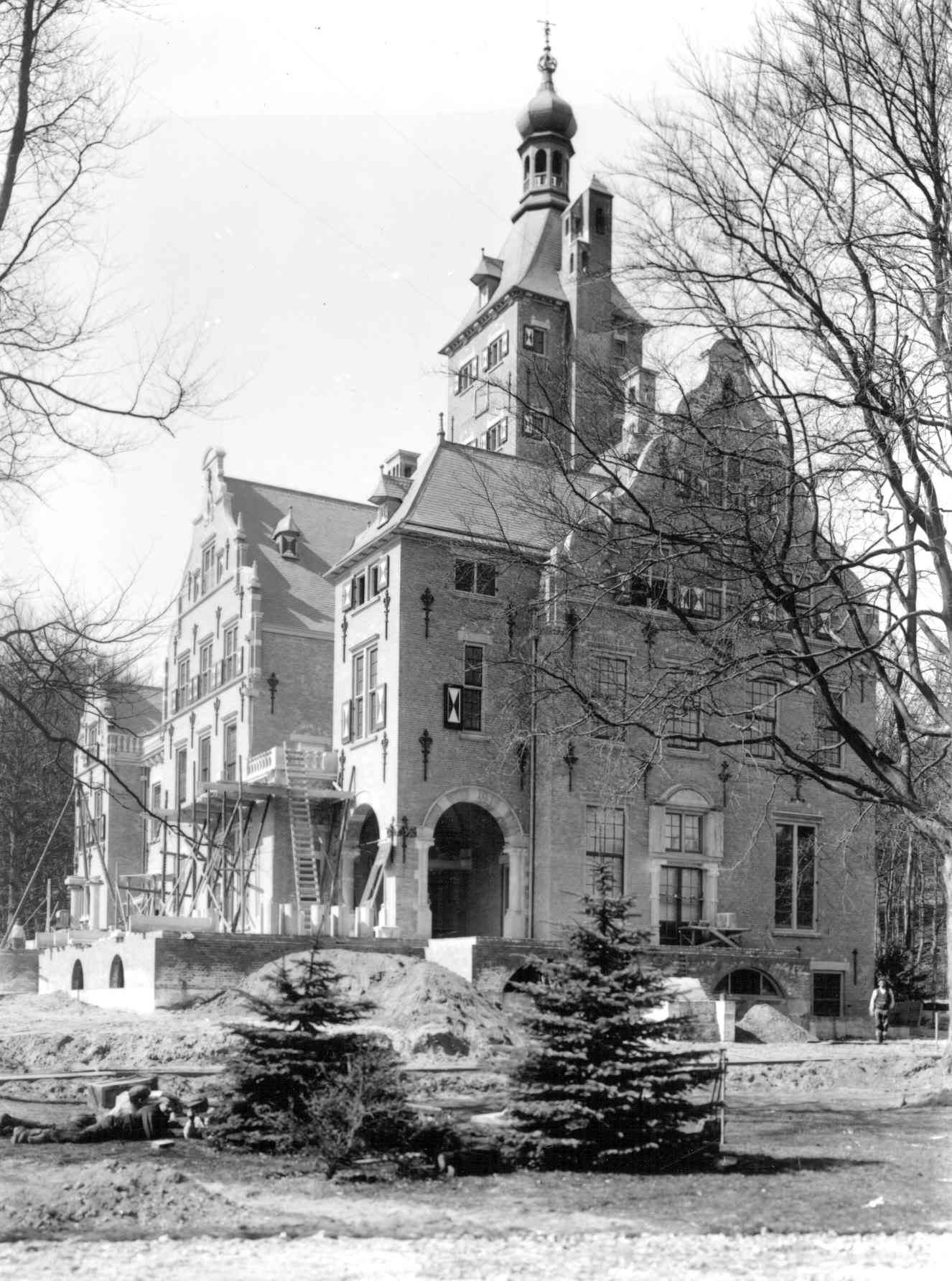
During construction

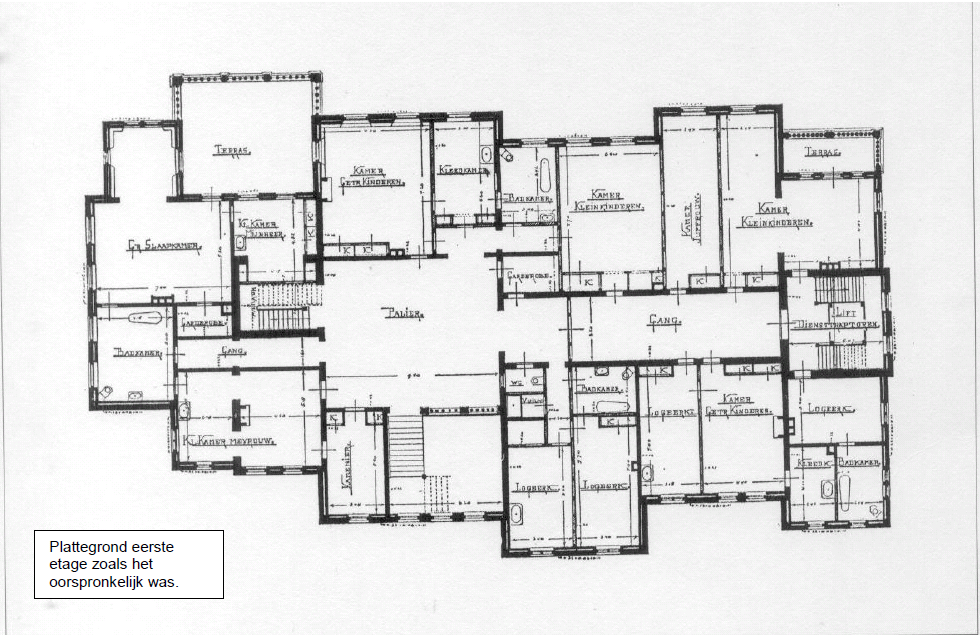
First floor plan

Cremer commissioned the architect Johannes van Nieukerken (1854–1913) and his team to design a new country house at Duin and Kruidberg. Van Nieukerken and his sons specialized in a Dutch Renaissance revival style, characterized by richly decorated brick façades, contrasting blocks, masks and figures, step gables, picturesque towers, and intricate reliefs and sculptures. This style, reflecting the Dutch Golden Age, was widely popular and became a national architectural identity in the Netherlands at that time. This influence extended to private residences, such as Duin en Kruidberg. Designed to accommodate Cremer and his extended family in a manner reminiscent of English country homes, the house featured numerous bedrooms, bathrooms, and private spaces, ensuring comfort and privacy for all family members and staff. The result was a large, hotel-like residence that fulfilled the family's needs. Later, Cremer would employ the Van Nieukerkens again with the design of the Colonial Institute in Amsterdam and the NHM building in The Hague. Both buildings share stylistic similarities with Duin en Kruidberg. Other houses designed by them were Westerhout in Beverwijk and Wittenburg Castle in Wassenaar (with a similar tower, inspired by the tower of Zuylestein Castle). Also, they created the Shell headquarters in The Hague.

In July 1907, the foundation stone for Duin en Kruidberg was laid by Cremer's five-year-old grandson. The event is commemorated by a plaque on the lakeside of the house. The elder Van Nieukerken directed the exterior design, while his sons Johan and Marie Adrianus handled the boudoir and dining room designs and the overall practical design, respectively. Mrs. Cremer actively contributed ideas and suggestions throughout the two-and-a-half-year construction, sometimes causing conflicts with the architects. One notable feature she insisted on was an automatic door in the hall, later removed during renovations in 1996–1997. The house was equipped with modern conveniences such as central heating, hot running water, an electric lift, and telephones. It also had its own water supply system with a reservoir, deferrization system, and pump installation, ensuring a constant water supply and fire-fighting capability.

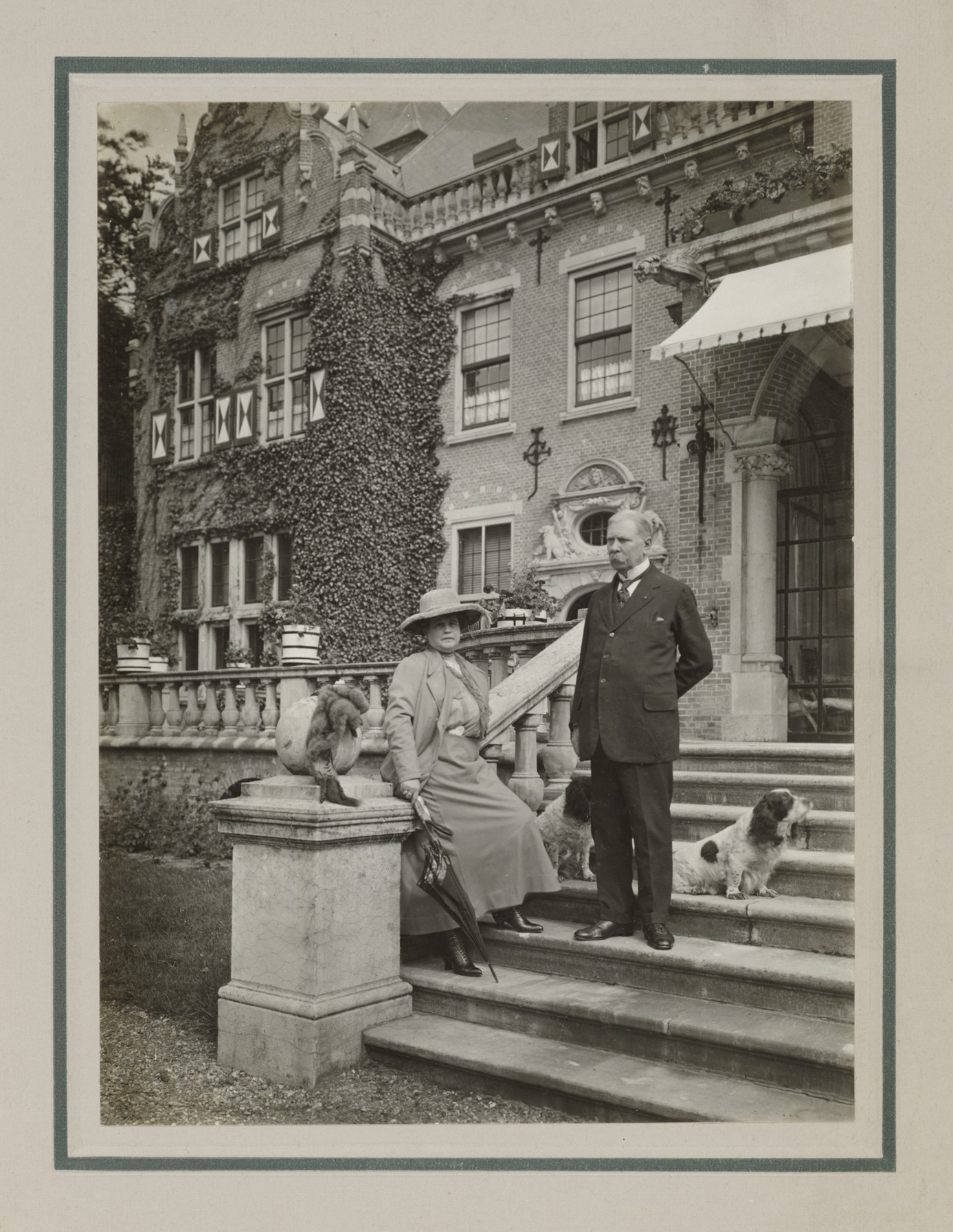
Jacob Theodoor Cremer and wife on terrace

Duin en Kruidberg was designed with a clear functional layout: the ground floor housed the main living areas where the family lived, ate, and entertained guests, while the basement was designated for staff living and work areas, including the kitchen, servants' dining room, and various utility rooms. The first floor contained the family's bedrooms, bathrooms, and guest rooms, and the attic had additional guest rooms and separate quarters for domestic staff.

Before the house was fully completed, Cremer hosted a reception for the International Colonial Congress on 2 June 1909, with Prince Henry (1876–1934), Queen Wilhelmina's husband, as a notable guest. The event required significant last-minute preparations but was successful despite some mishaps, such as the Prince's dog leaving a malodorous memento in the master bedroom. The family moved in on June 28, 1909, and the house was officially completed on October 17, 1909. The construction cost 205,000 guilders, excluding the furnishings and garden.

Inside the house, reminders of Cremer are prominent, including a white marble bust by Arend Odé and a marble relief of a small boy by Pier Pander in the vestibule.

=== 1920s and beyond ===
Jacob Theodoor Cremer died in August 1923, and his son Herbert lived in the house until 1940. During the Second World War, part of the house served as a Roman Catholic church and refectory after the Germans closed the neighbouring village of Driehuis in 1942. The entire Santpoort region, including the house, was evacuated in 1944 for the construction of the Atlantik Wall . The Cremer family managed to save many furnishings, preserving much of the house's original interior. The house was then used to billet German officers and part of the estate became a shooting range. Post-war, the Canadian army requisitioned the house, followed by its use as a training centre for Red Cross nurses and a center for repatriates from Indonesia. Eventually, the house became a hotel, maintaining its original purpose of hosting guests in style throughout the years.

=== Duin en Kruidberg as a holiday resort of ABN AMRO ===
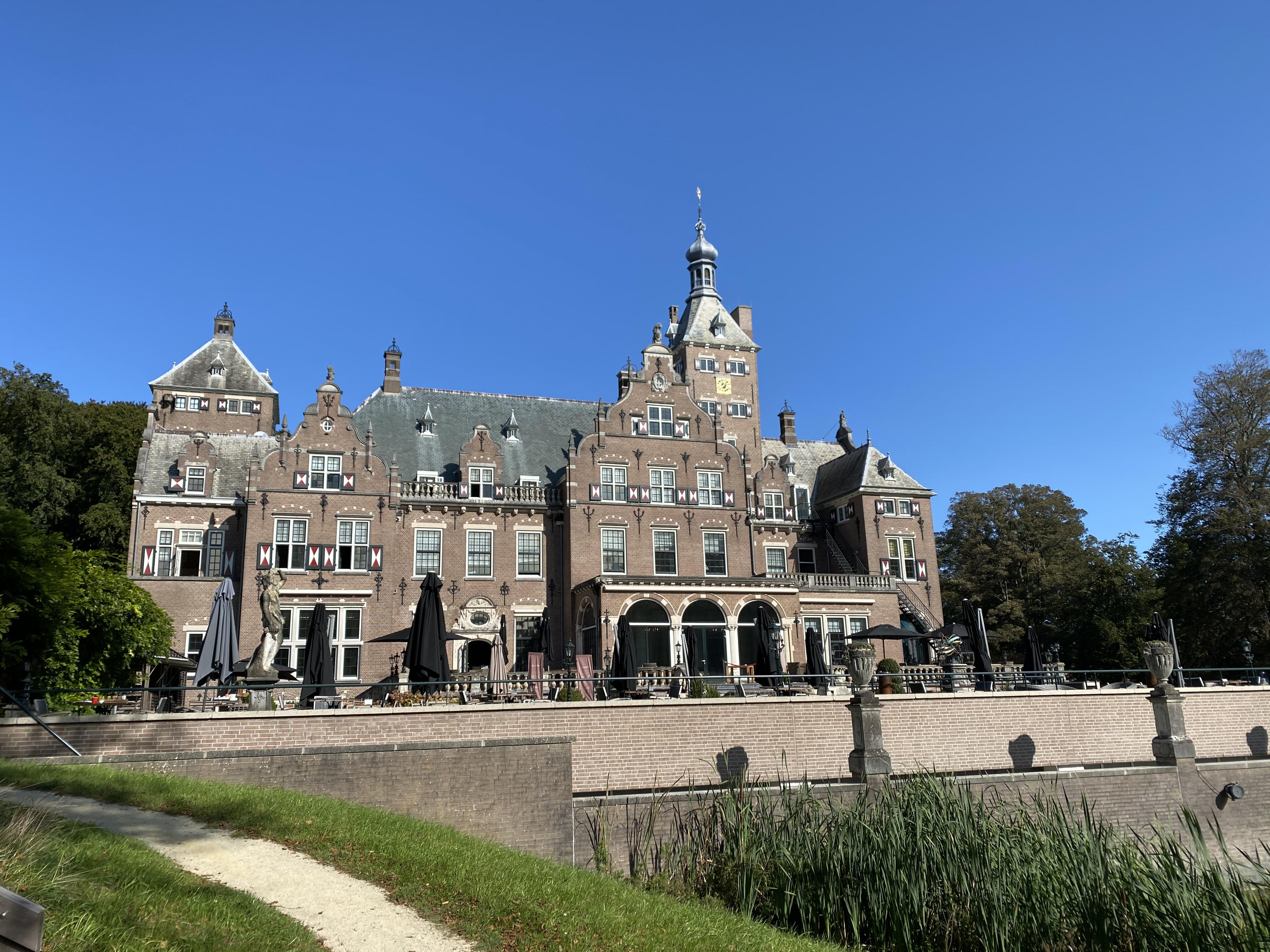
From the pond

During the twentieth century, many country houses in Kennemerland (and the Netherlands) frequently changed ownership due to the escalating costs of maintenance. While some estates have found new purposes as parks, residential estates, or clinics, others have vanished, such as during the construction of the North Sea Canal in 1876, which linked Amsterdam to the North Sea. Today, most former country estates in the Netherlands are owned by the state, provinces, local authorities, or heritage societies, with only a handful remaining in private hands.

In 1961, the heirs of the Cremer family sold the house and grounds to the Nederlandsche Handel-Maatschappij. The company transformed it into a holiday home for its employees, a popular practice among large corporations after the Second World War to foster strong employer-employee relationships and attract new staff. Various incentives such as in-house magazines, work councils, employee associations, and staff parties were introduced during this period, and company holiday homes became a valued perk.

On 15 June 1963, Duin en Kruidberg opened its doors to bank staff and retired employees, offering 92 beds and access to 400 hectares of woods and dunes. It quickly became a favoured resort for bank employees and their families, providing a range of activities, especially for young children. However, by the late 1980s and early 1990s, interest in the resort waned due to rising operational costs and a broader array of holiday options available to the public. This, coupled with shifts in corporate culture, led to the closure of Duin en Kruidberg as a company holiday resort in 1994.

Subsequently, ABN AMRO, NHM's successor, started to use the house as a conference centre and decided to renovate it. In 1996, a conference center with five meeting rooms, four breakout rooms, and a Business Center was built. Additionally, the bank wanted to upgrade the rooms in the manor to 4- and 5-star levels. In 2000, a hotel wing with 44 modern hotel rooms was added.

=== Modern times ===
In 2002, Landgoed Duin & Kruidberg officially opened its gates to the general public as a five-star hotel, and the restaurant De Vrienden van Jacob was opened. GaultMillau awarded the restaurant 16 out of 20 points. At the start of the COVID-19 pandemic, the restaurant temporarily closed. In 2020, it permanently closed its doors.

On 23 December 2019, ABN AMRO sold Duin en Kruidberg to Lucas Petit, who manages six other hotels as well through his company Hoscom.

In 1981, the nature reserve of the estate became the property of Vereniging Natuurmonumenten. Since 1995, it has been a protected Natura 2000 area as part of the Zuid-Kennemerland National Park.

== Interior ==
=== Central hall ===
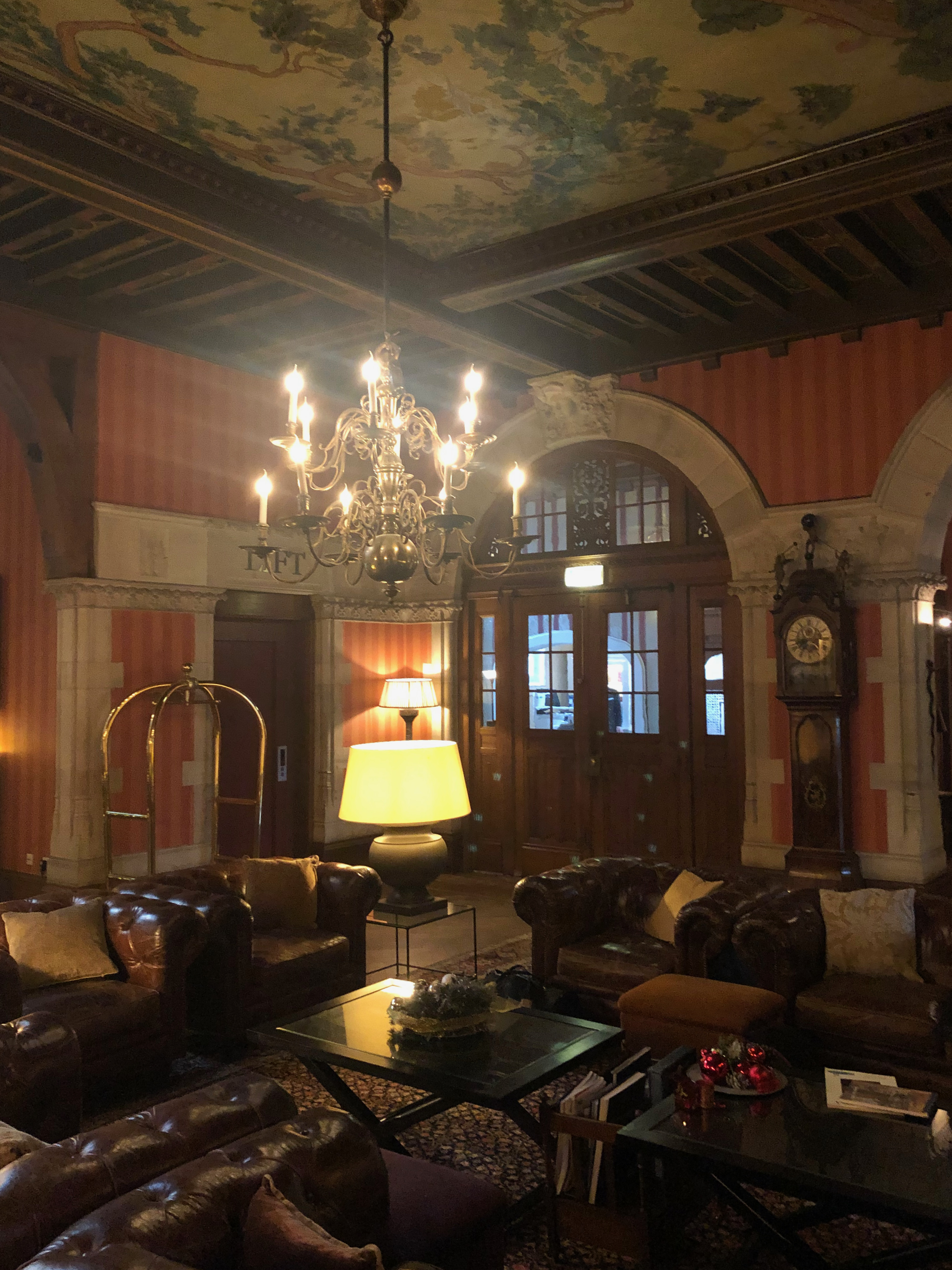
Central hall

The central hall and staircase in Renaissance revival style were adorned with a carved fireplace featuring figurative sculpture by Rien Hack, ornamental sculpture by August Alexander, and paintings by Johannes Löhr. The ceiling painting shows a sky with treetops and is the work of Simon Moulijn. The central hall is decorated with two large cast bronze Japanese vases from the Meiji era featuring fish in relief and sculptures of underwater life at the base. Opposite stands an Amsterdam longcase clock from 1750 by Jan Henkels, featuring Atlas with a celestial globe and a dial with a Dutch landscape. The staircase features a coffered ceiling with zodiac signs painted by Johannes Evert van Leeuwen.

=== Dining room ===
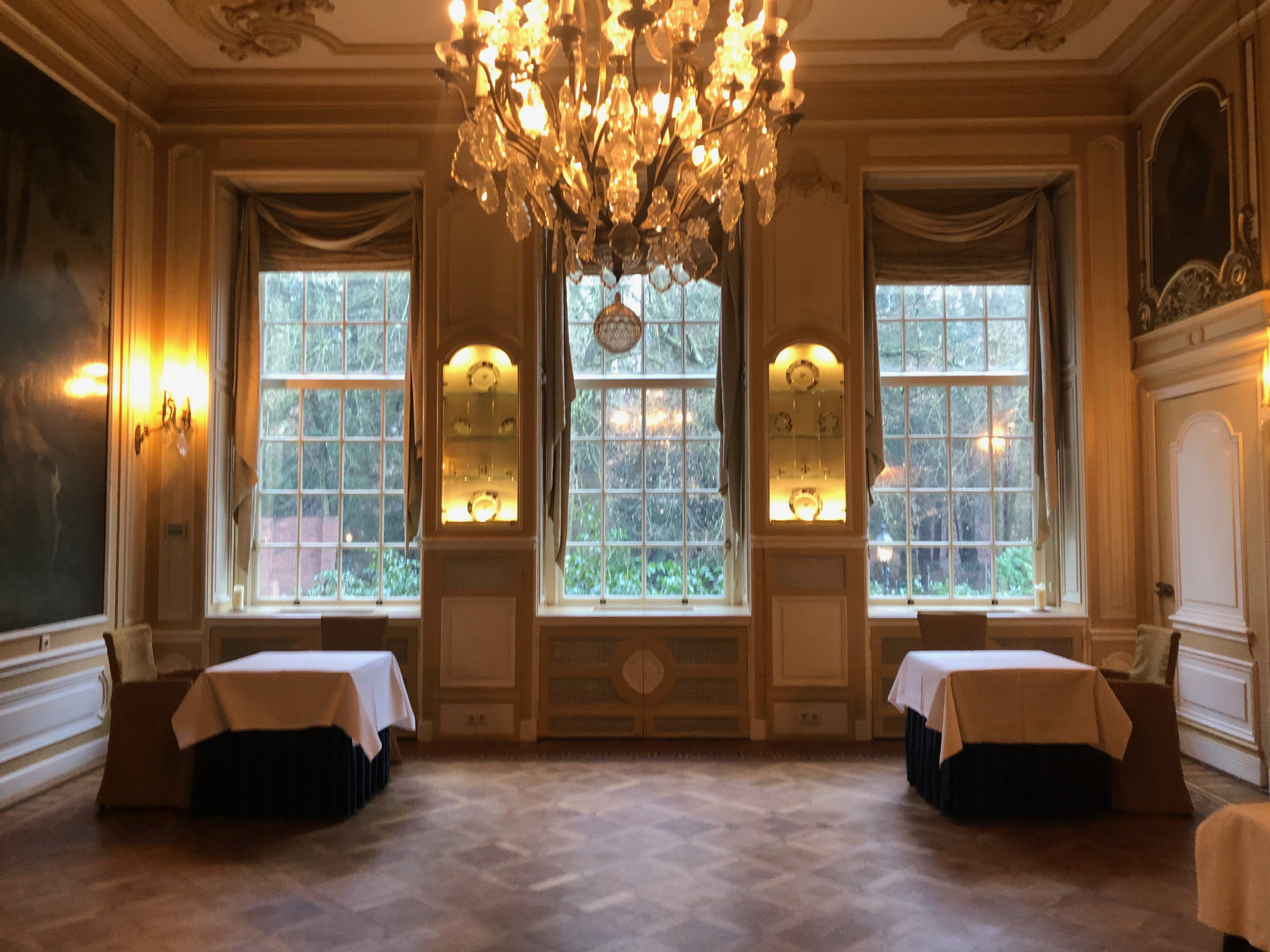
The dining room

The dining room in revival Louis XV style was decorated with wall and mural paintings by the Dordrecht artist Aert Schouman. These 1741 paintings, along with the mantel and ornaments, originate from the monumental Huis 't Zeepaert in Dordrecht and were installed in 1908. One of the three overdoor pieces featuring a bronze garden vase was additionally added in 1909 by mural painter Frans Vos (1847–1921).

=== Salon room ===
The salon room is executed in revival Louis XV style. It contains grisailles by Jacob de Wit, brought from Amsterdam. Three grisailles were moved in 1961 and in 1990 replaced with paintings by Jacob de Wit from Herengracht 434, the former bank building of the Hollandsche Bank-Unie in Amsterdam.

=== Boudoir ===
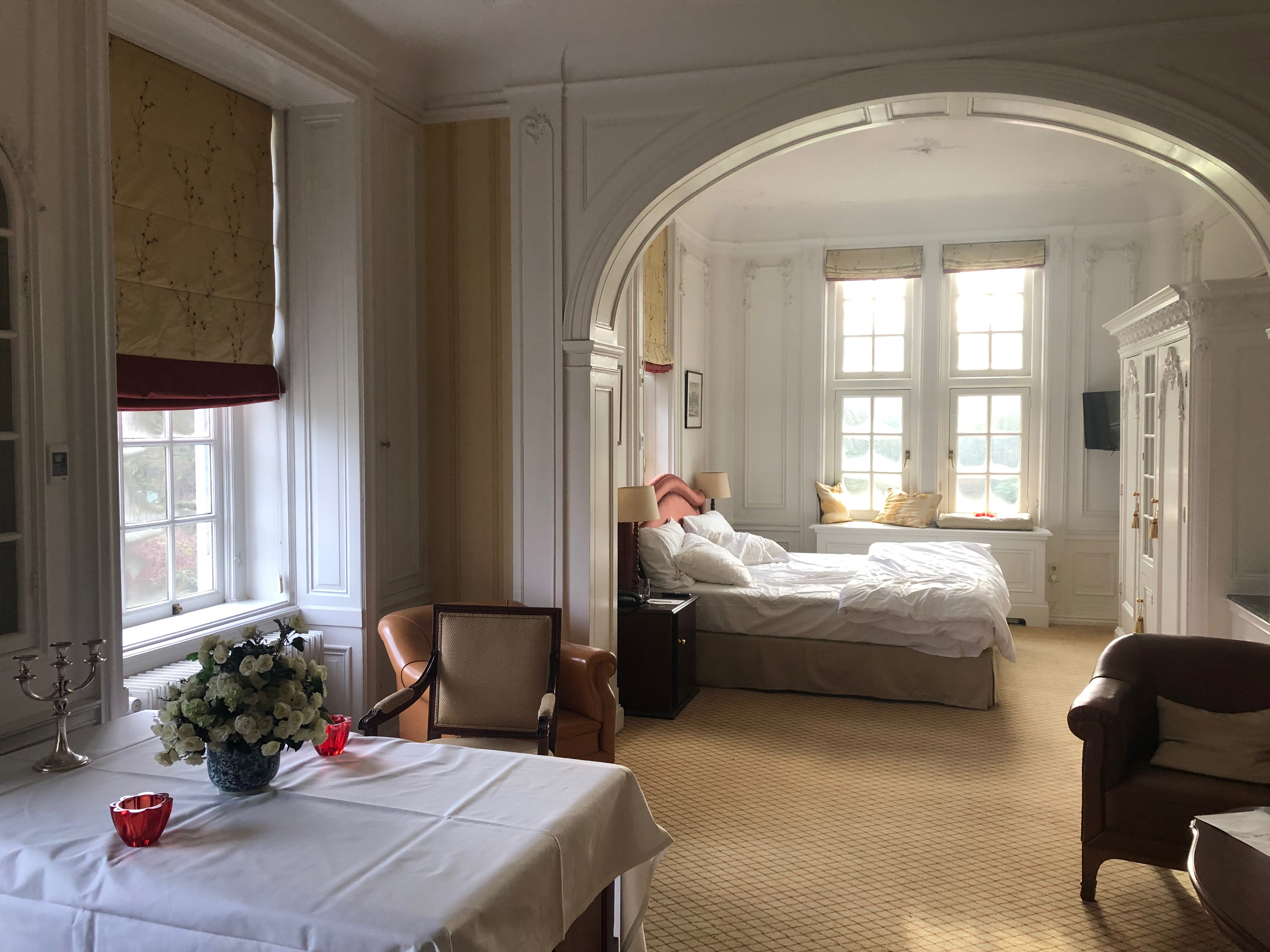
Bedroom (2021)

Mrs. Cremer's boudoir overlooks the park and is executed in Louis XVI style with a mantelpiece originating from a former house in The Hague and a frieze featuring cameo imitations by Johannes Evert van Leeuwen and stucco work by Louis Vreugde.

=== Billiard room ===
The billiard room was furnished by the furniture makers Hampton & Sons from London. Between the pilasters of the mantelpiece are three kakemonos from 1850, vertical Japanese scroll paintings on silk, decorated with Buddha figures.

== Gardens ==
The French formal gardens that once decorated both Duin en Berg and Kruidberg have disappeared. No physical traces remain. The current English landscape garden surrounding the house was designed by Leonard Springer (1855–1940), a landscape architect based in Haarlem, who also designed Thijsse's Hof in nearby Bloemendaal.

== See also ==
- Renaissance Revival architecture

== Literature ==
- Mobron, Jan-Jaap (1997). Duin en Kruidberg, Van prinselijke jachtverblijf tot modern conferentieoord / From royal hunting lodge to modern conference centre (in Dutch and English). Amsterdam: ABN MRO Historisch archief. p. 59.
- Hartendorf, Guus; Morren, Jan (1998). Duin en Kruidberg. Honderd jaar buitenplaats. Het duingebied van de familie Cremer (in Dutch). Haarlem: De Vrieseborch. p. 200. ISBN 9789060764398.
- Morren, Jan (2002). Kastelen en buitenplaatsen in Velsen – deel 1 Santpoort (in Dutch). Huizen: Lorelax productions. pp. 72–92. ISBN 90-76254-34-6.
- Mobron, Jan-Jaap (2006). Duin en Kruidberg De geschiedenis van een landgoed/The history of a Country Estate (in Dutch and English). Amsterdam: ABN MRO Historisch archief. p. 63. ISBN 9789076618180.
- Mobron, Jan-Jaap; Roowaan, Ries (2006). Duin en Kruidberg de belangrijkste kunstobjecten - Highlights of the Art Collection (in Dutch and English). Amsterdam: ABN MRO Historisch archief. p. 80. ISBN 9789076618197.
