= De Vrienden van Jacob =

Coordinates: 52°26′2.7″N 4°37′32.63″E

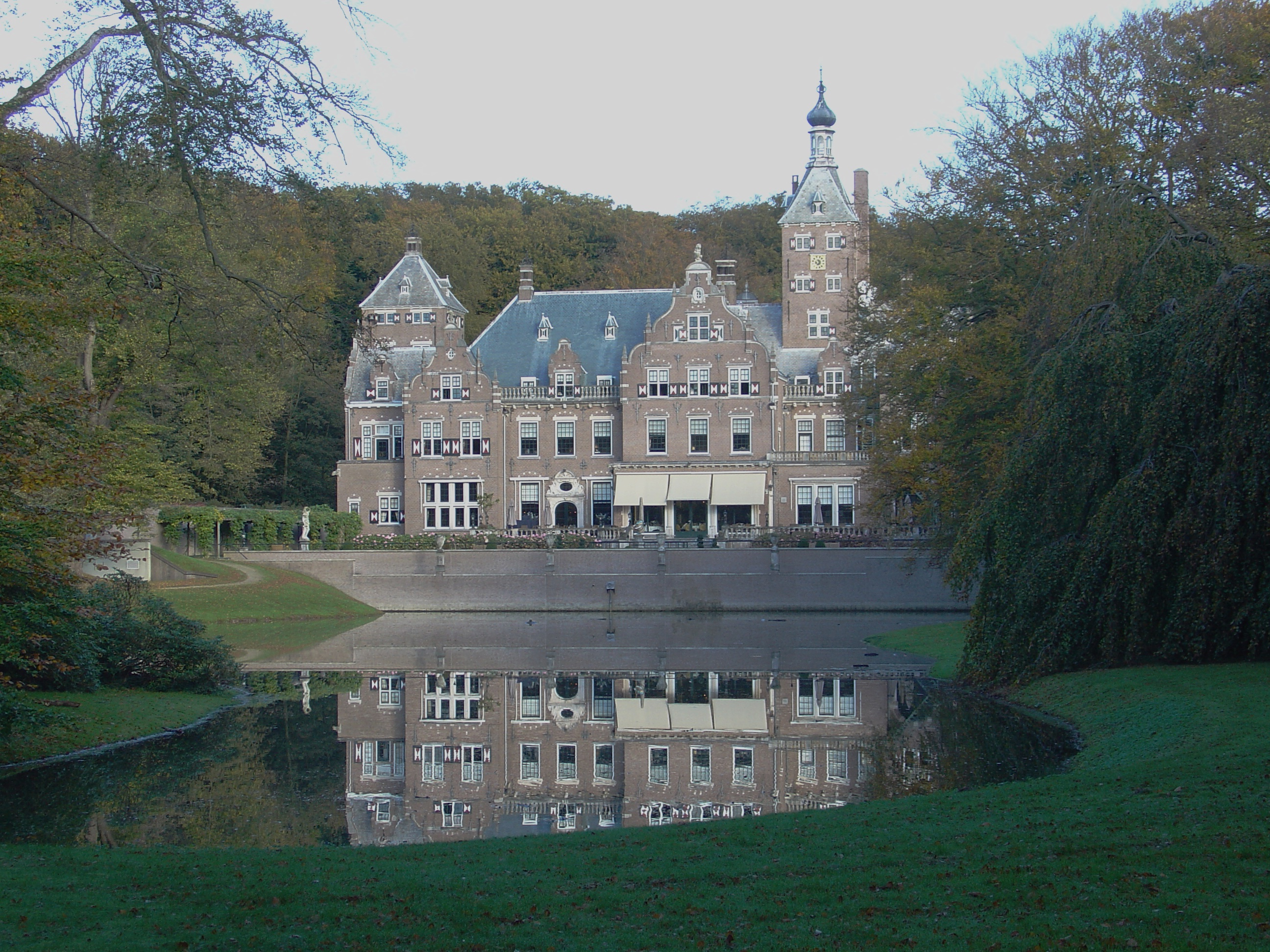
- Interactive map of De Vrienden van Jacob

Restaurant information
- Established: 2002
- Head chef: Alain Alders
- Food type: French, Mediterranean
- Rating: Michelin Guide
- Location: Duin en Kruidbergerweg 60, Santpoort, 2071 LE, Netherlands
- Seating capacity: 40
- Website: Official website

De Vrienden van Jacob is a restaurant in Santpoort, Netherlands. It is a fine dining restaurant that was awarded one Michelin star for the period 2006–present.

GaultMillau awarded the restaurant 16 out of 20 points.

Head chef of De Vrienden van Jacob is Alain Alders.

De restaurant is part of the country estate and hotel Duin en Kruidberg. In 2008, the restaurant was closed for five months due to extensive renovations to the restaurant and the hotel. The estate is over 100 years old. Originally it was a conference centre and holiday resort for staff of ABN AMRO. In 2002 the hotel was opened up for the general public and restaurant De Vrienden van Jacob established.

== See also ==
- List of Michelin starred restaurants in the Netherlands
