= Howard & Sons =

British furniture company

Howard & Sons is a furniture maker in London, England. The main address was at Berners Street 25–27.

== History ==
The business was opened in 1820. Their sofas and chairs became popular during the Victorian era amongst the upper class. They collaborated with Gillows of Lancaster. They supplied furniture to the Savoy Hotel in London. Howard & Sons received a number of Royal Warrants of Appointment. Some authentic designs of Howard & Sons furniture nowadays are in the State Hermitage museum, Saint-Petersburg, Russia.

== See also ==
- Hampton & Sons, contemporary maker of similar furniture
