= Hampton & Sons =

Hampton & Sons was a furniture maker in London, England. The main address was at Pall Mall.

== History ==
The business was opened in 1830 by William Hampton as a shop for the sale of general household furniture, located on Cranbourn Street. Their sofas and chairs became popular during the Edwardian era amongst the upper class. They made the furniture for the Park Lounge in the Dorchester Hotel in London and the Royal Yacht Britannia. International customers also included the Nizam of Hyderabad and the Maharajah of Kashmir. Hampton & Sons had the Royal Warrant of Appointment to Queen Elizabeth The Queen Mother.

The company existed until around 1957.

== See also ==
- Howard & Sons, contemporary maker of similar furniture
