= 1001 Vrouwen uit de Nederlandse geschiedenis =

2013 book

- Language: Dutch
- Genre: Biographical dictionary
- Publisher: Uitgeverij Vantilt
- Publication date: 2013
- Publication place: Netherlands
- Pages: 1555
- ISBN: 978-94-6004120-4
- OCLC: 827790391

1001 Vrouwen uit de Nederlandse geschiedenis is a compilation of 1001 biographies of famous women of the Netherlands spanning roughly 1700 years.

== Project ==
The book is the result of a research project called the Digital Women's Lexicon of the Netherlands (Digitaal Vrouwenlexicon van Nederland) led by Els Kloek. The biographies are presented in alphabetical order, and can also be viewed online. The breakdown of biographies per period according to the website (which is still growing) is as follows:

Period of birth	Number of biographies
before 1399	70
1400-1499	50
1500-1599	162
1600-1699	295
1700-1799	286
1800-1899	278
1900-1999	125

Over 300 writers contributed biographies. The historians Anna de Haas, Marloes Huiskamp, Els Kloek, and Kees Kuiken each wrote over 40 biographies, while nearly a third were the combined work of various editors. The book was designed by Irma Boom.

== Gallery (by birth year) ==
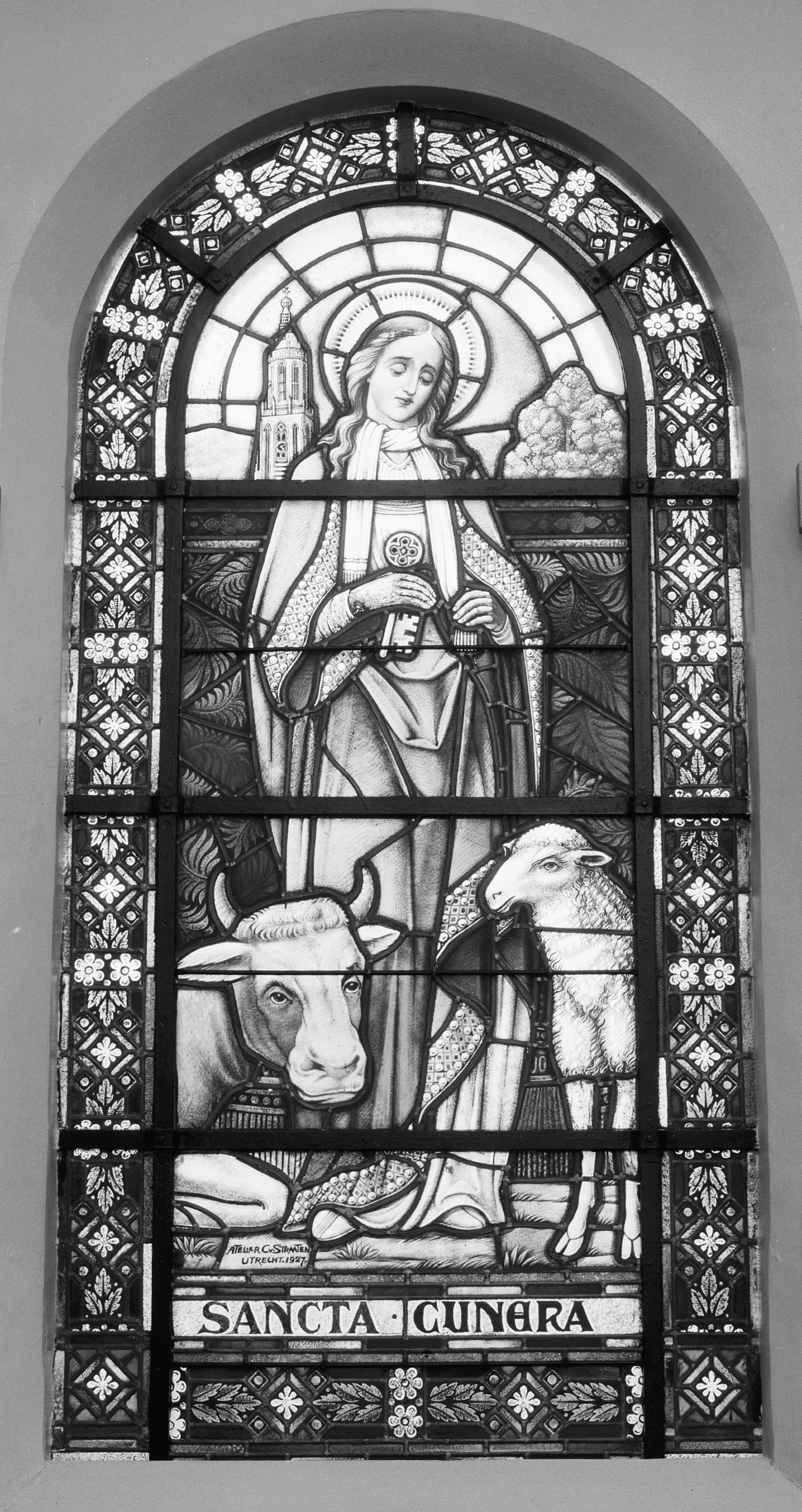
Saint Cunera (lived ca. 337)

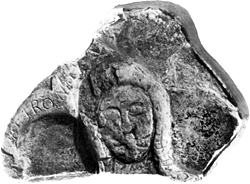
Petronilla van Saksen (ca. 1082–1144)

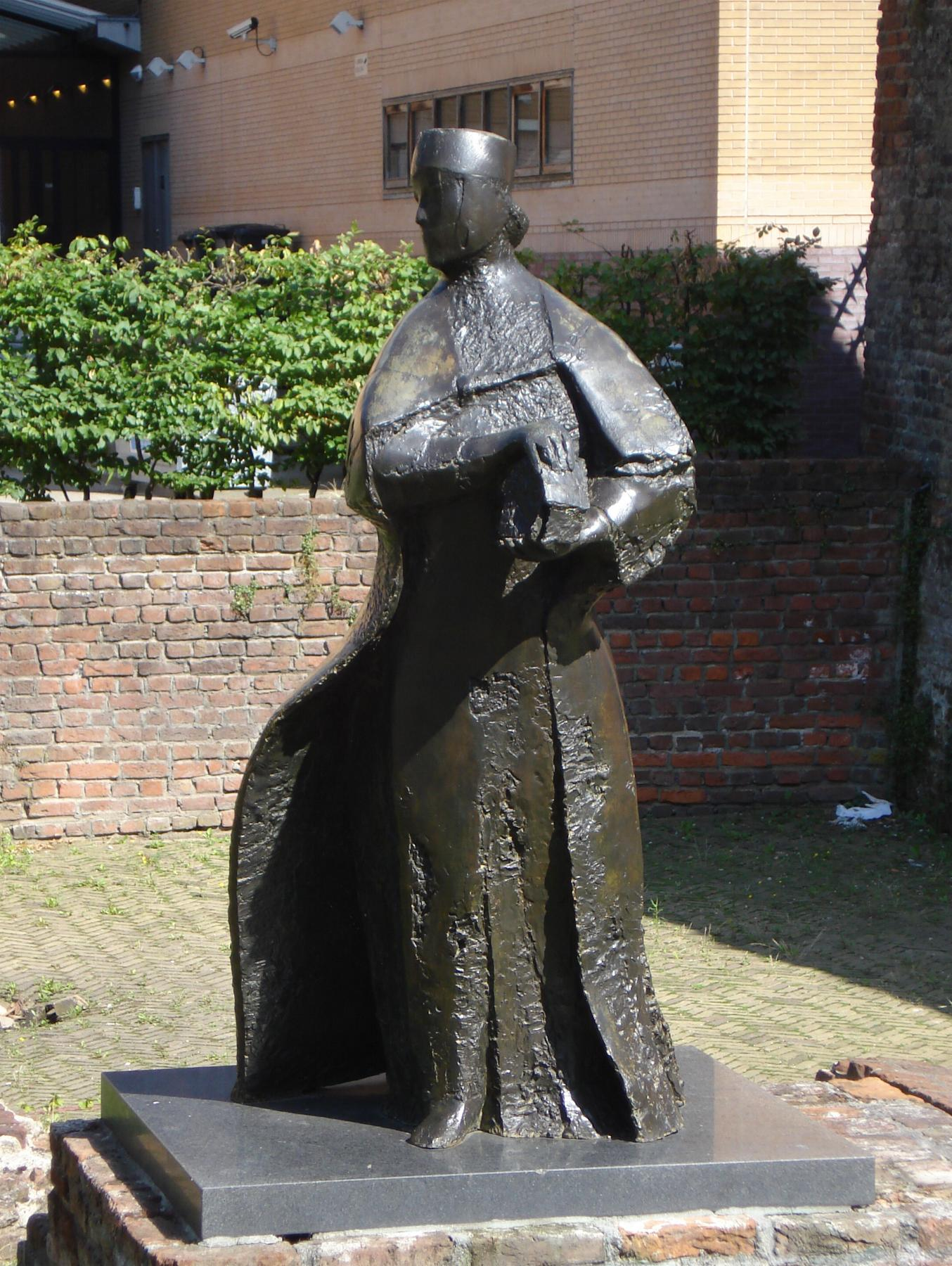
Aleid van Holland (1228–1284)

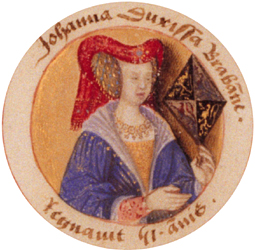
Johanna van Brabant (1322–1406)

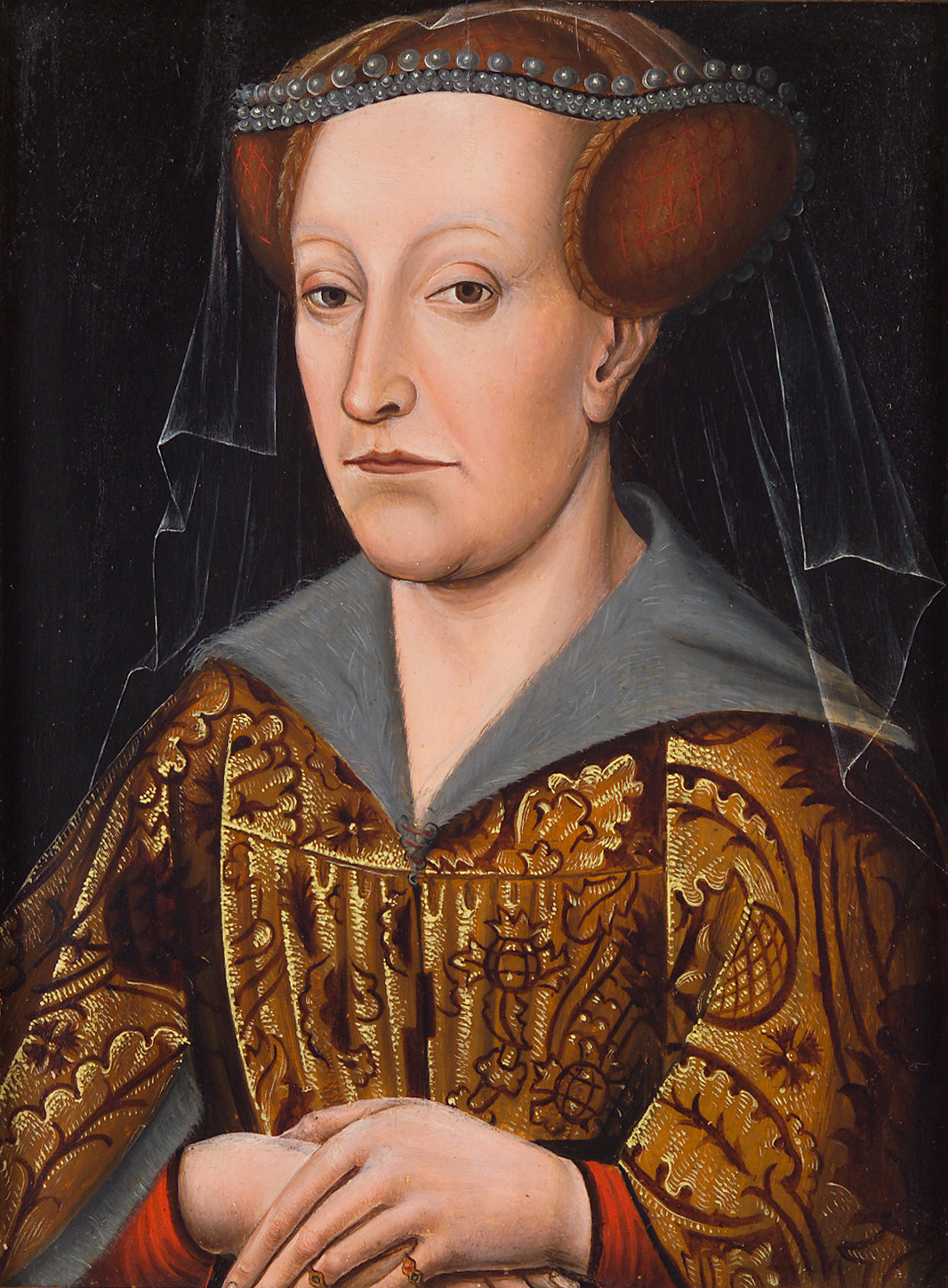
Jacoba van Beieren (1401–1436)

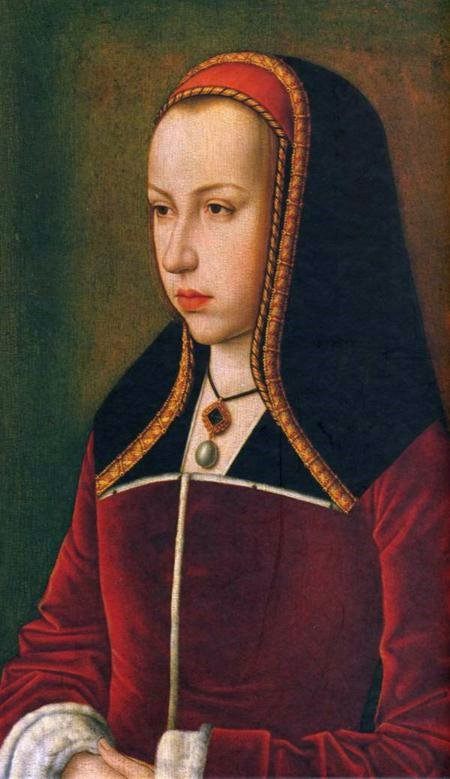
Margaret of Austria, Duchess of Savoy (1480–1530)

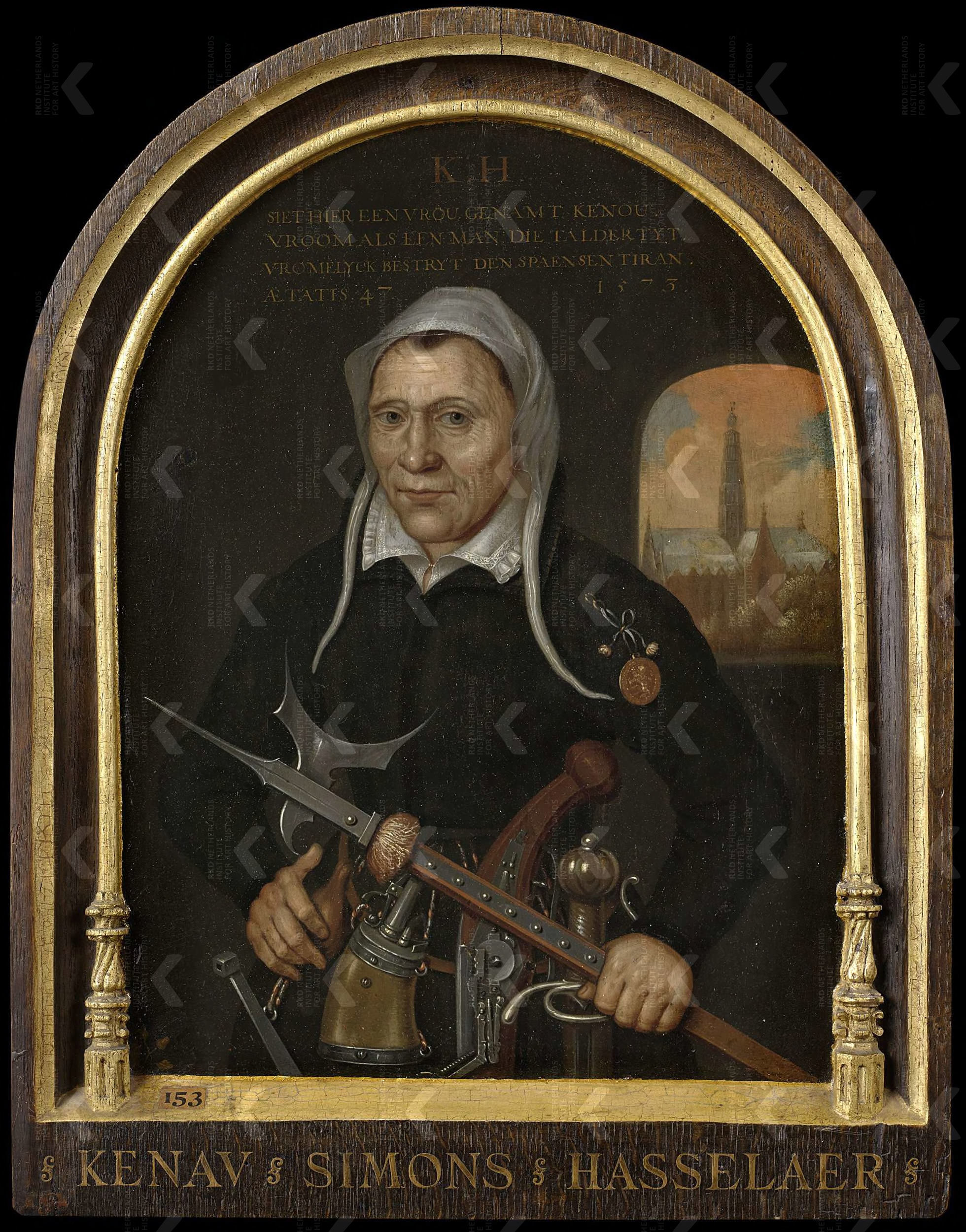
Kenau (1526-1588/1589)

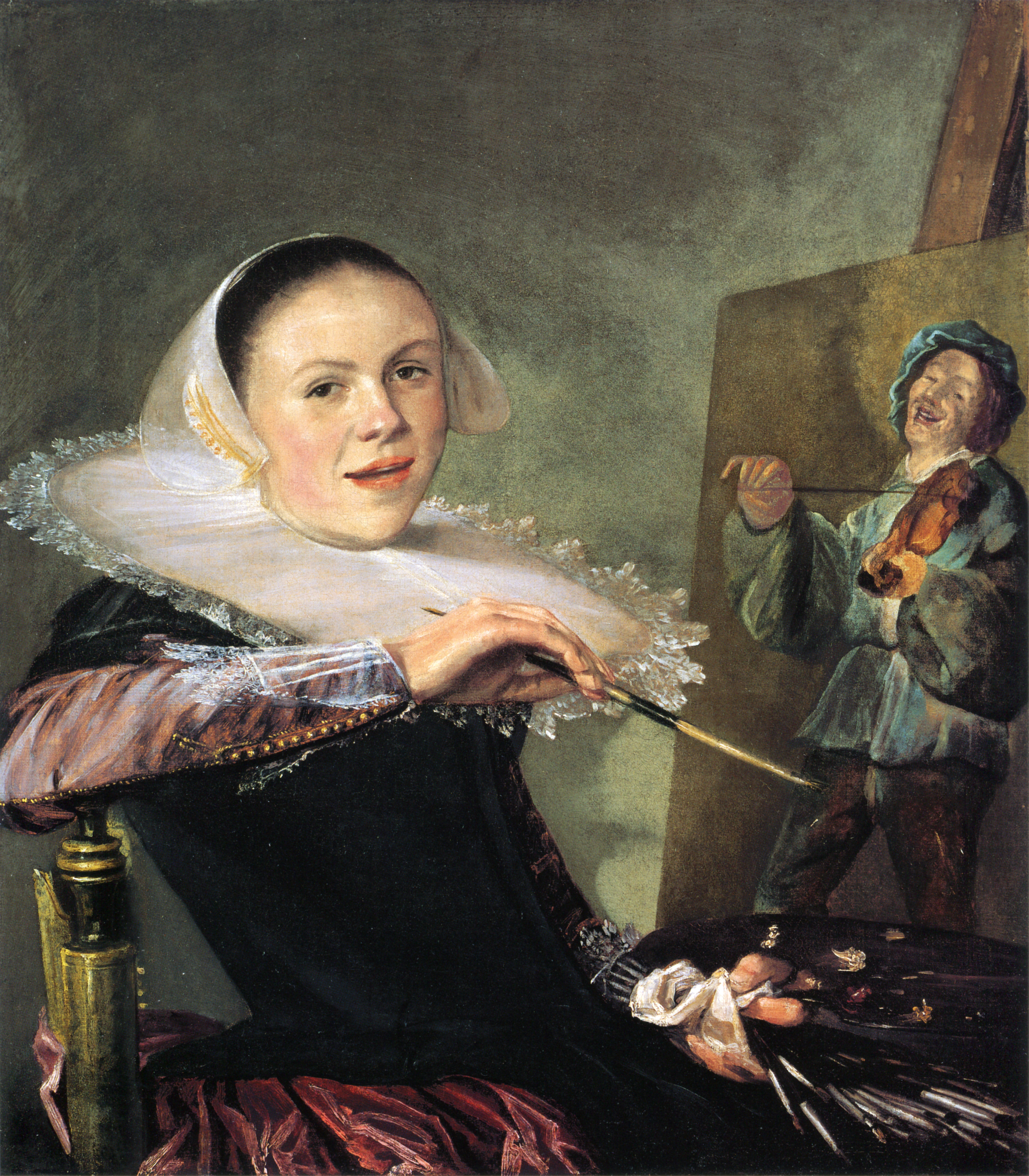
Judith Leyster (1609–1660)

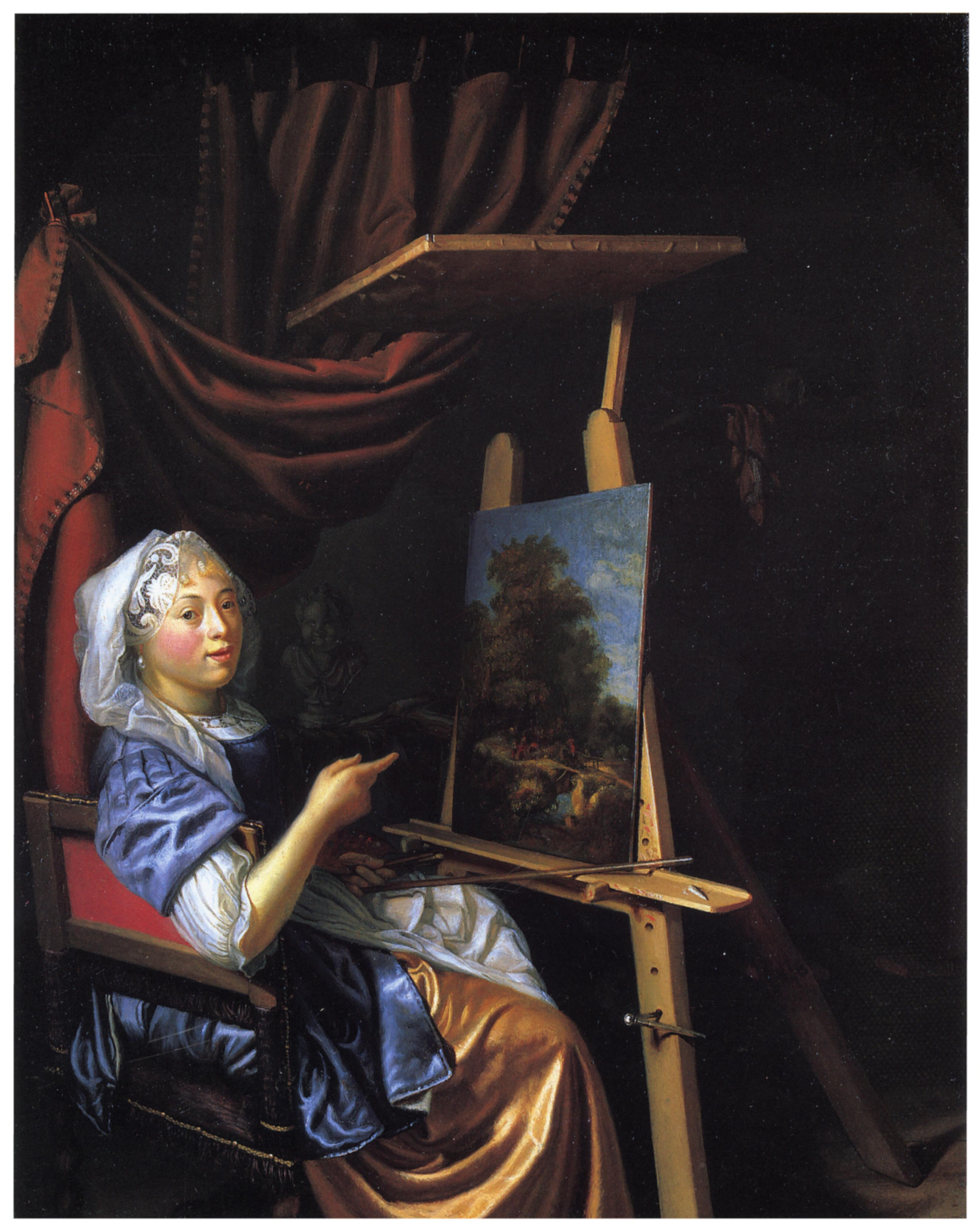
Maria Schalcken (1645–1699)

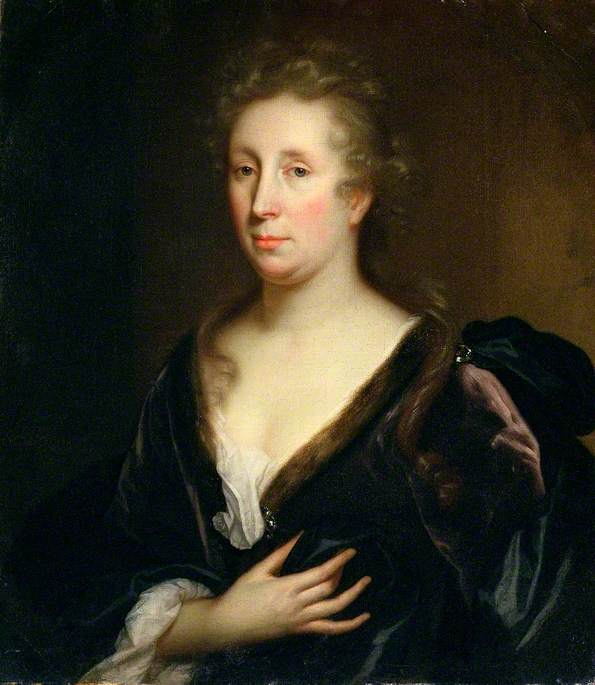
Rachel Ruysch (1664–1750)

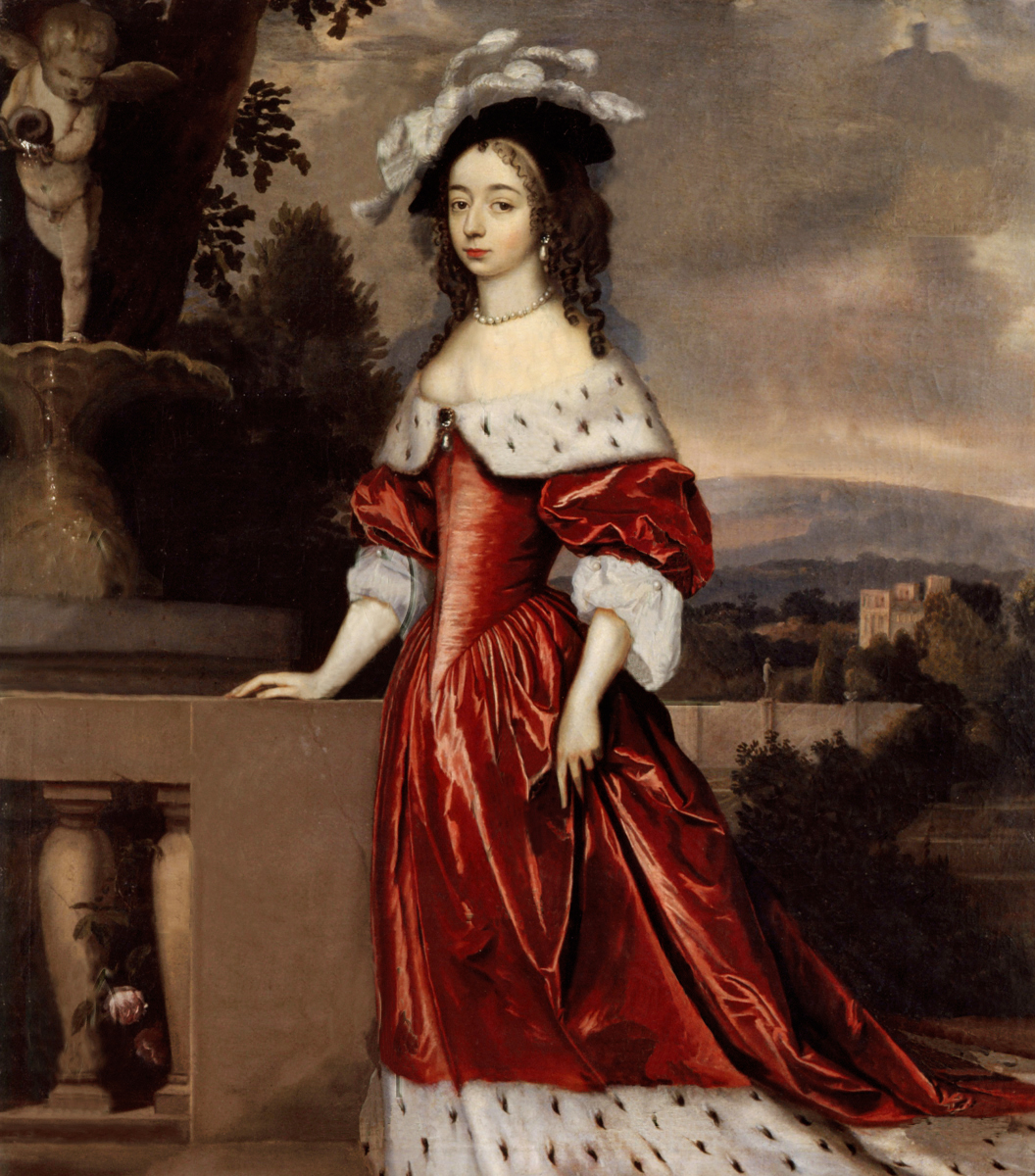
Henriëtte Catharina van Oranje (1637–1708)

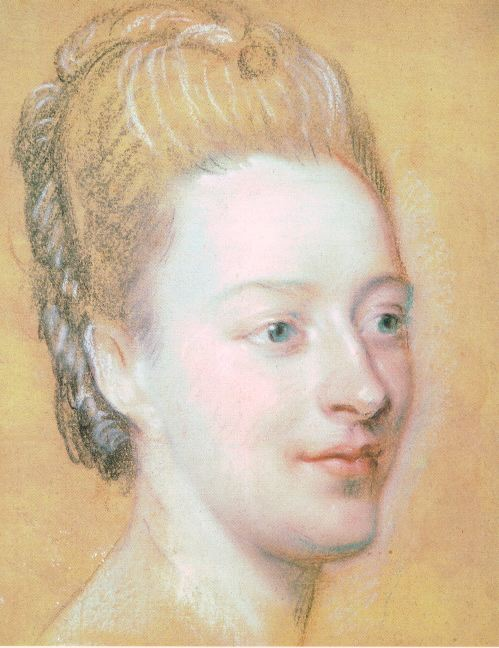
Belle van Zuylen (1740–1805)

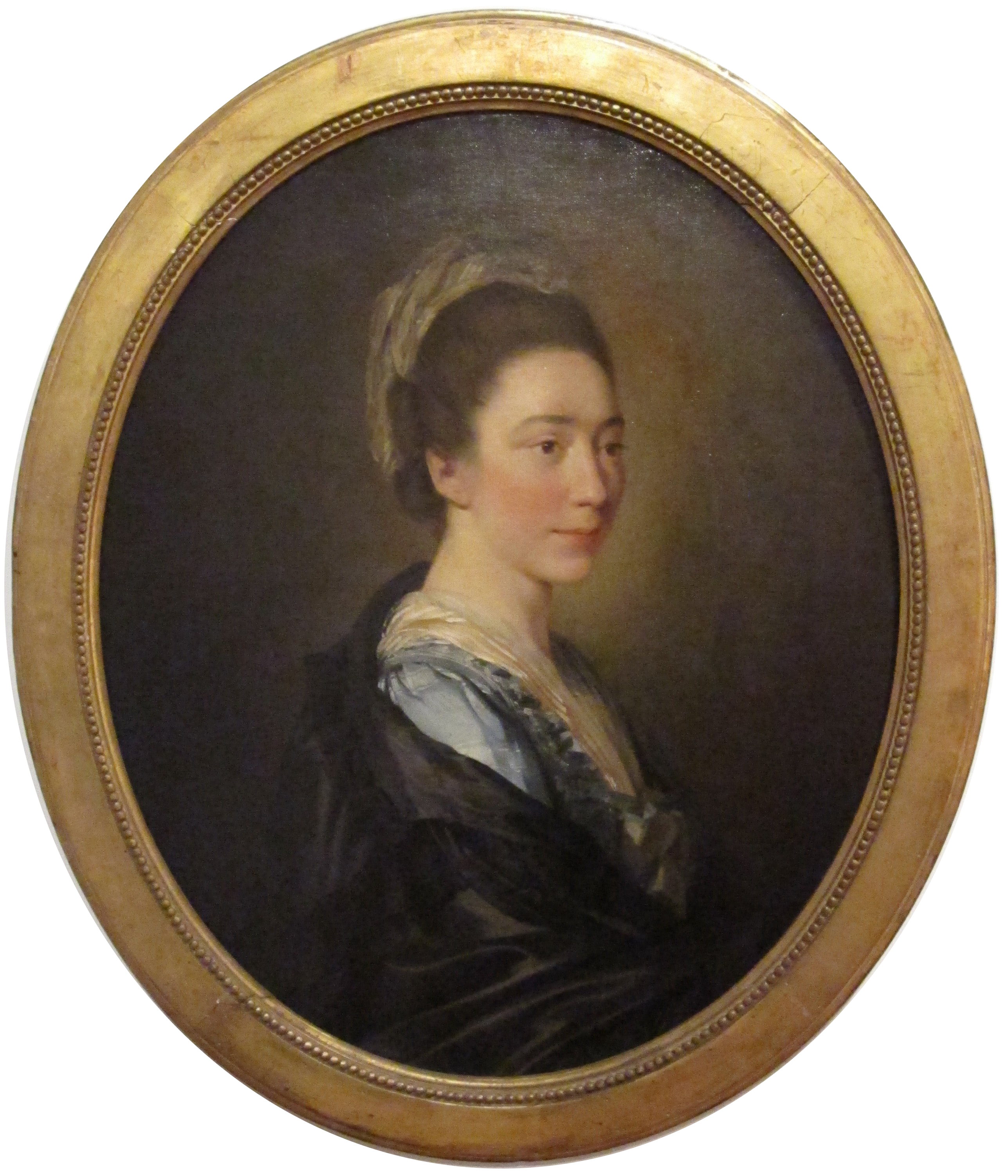
Marie-Anne Collot (1748–1821)

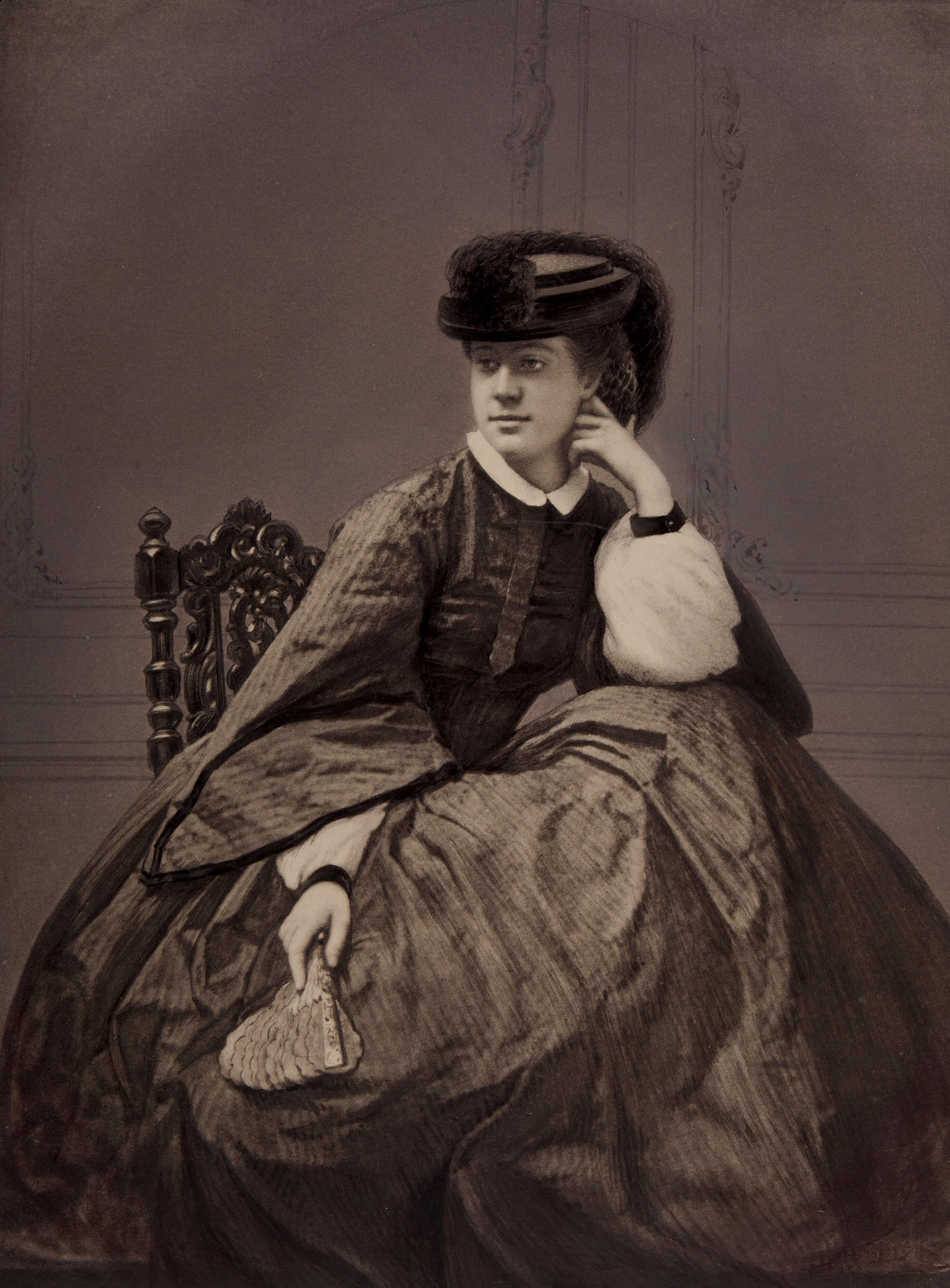
Alexine Tinne (1835–1869)

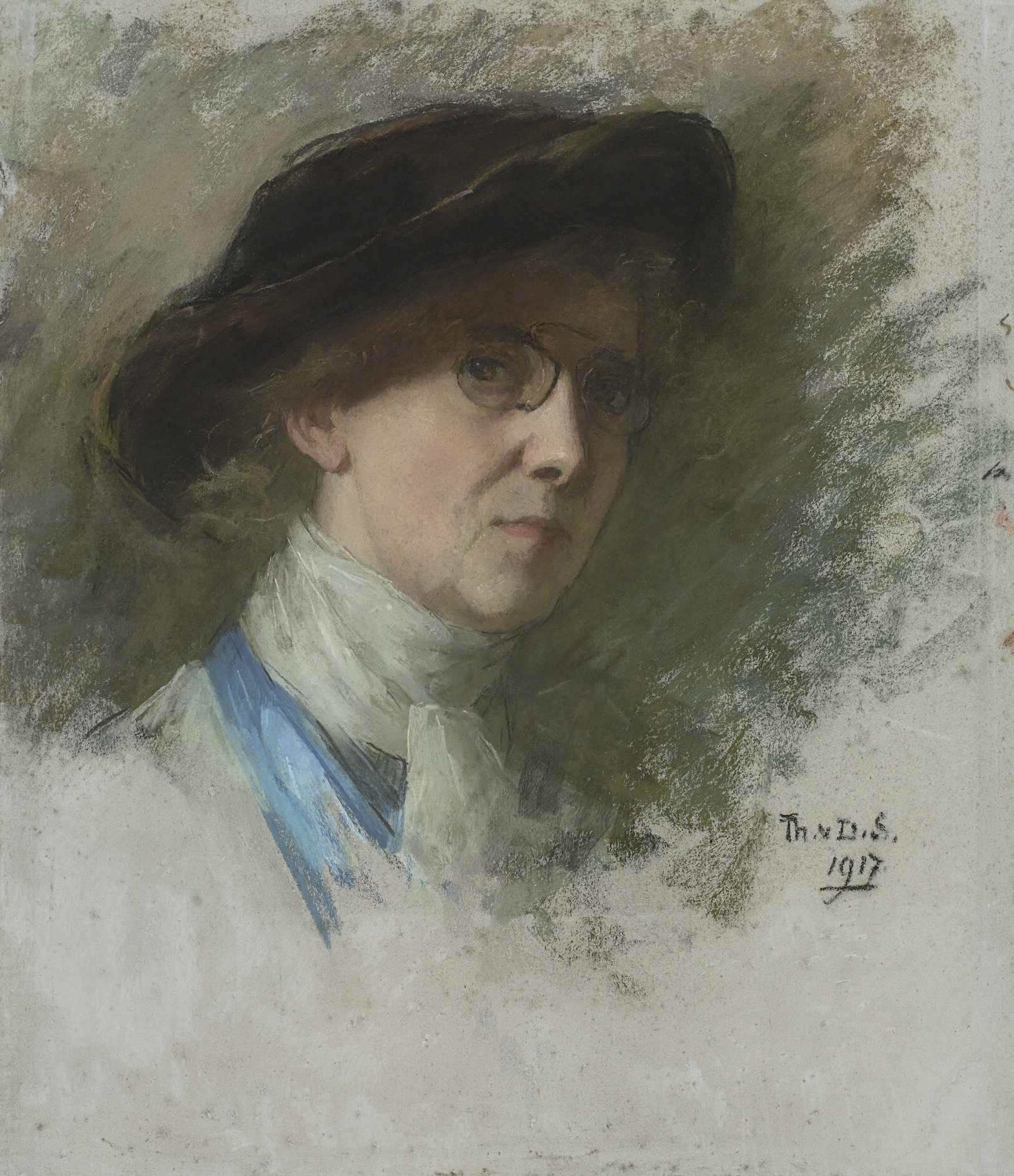
Thérèse Schwartze (1851–1918)

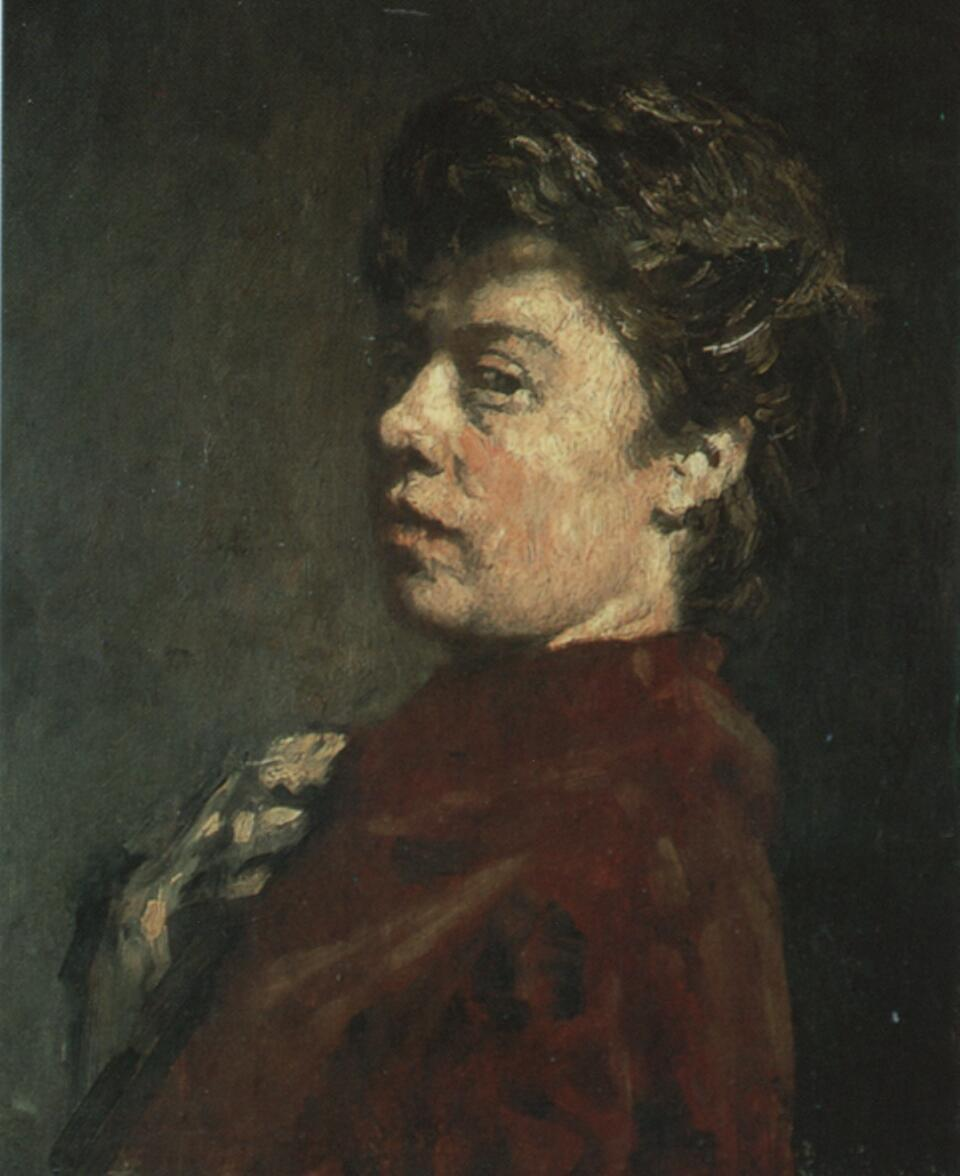
Suze Robertson (1855–1922)

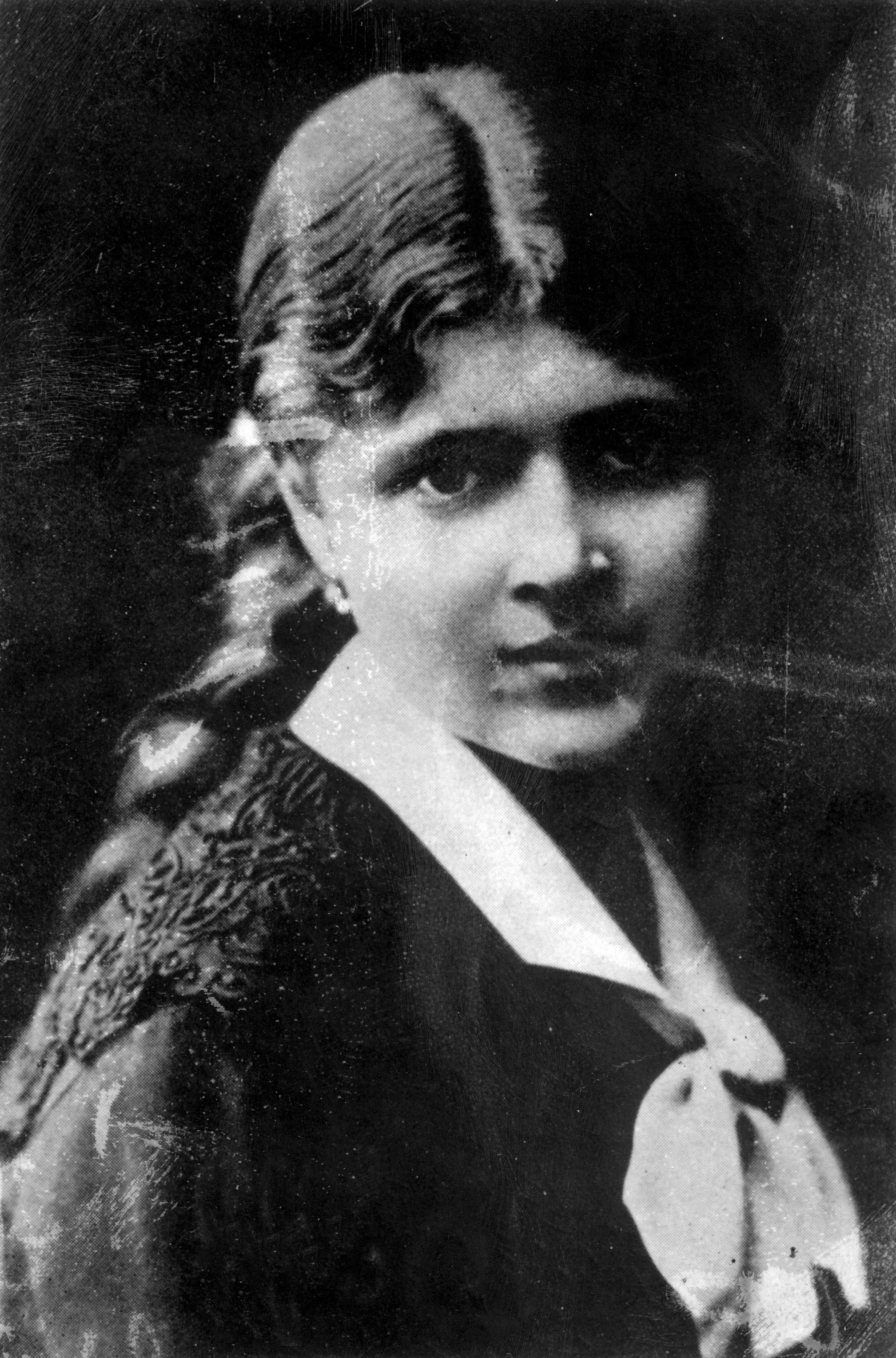
Neel Doff (1858–1942)

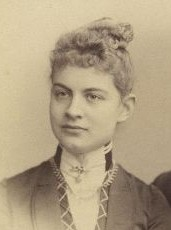
Helene Kröller-Müller (1869–1939)

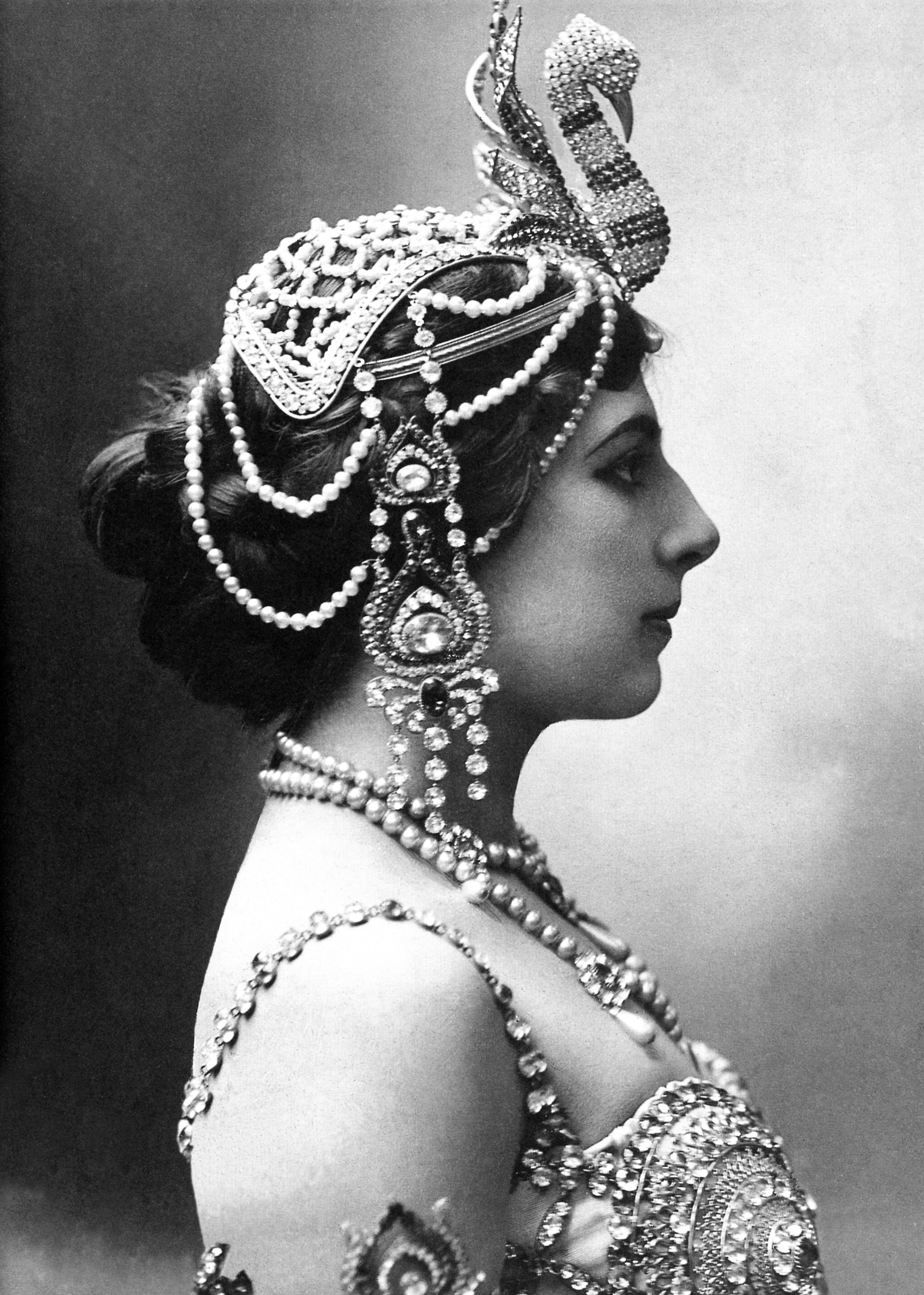
Mata Hari (1876–1917)

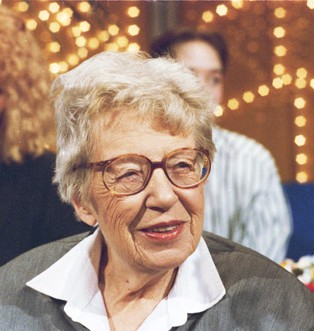
Annie M.G. Schmidt (1911–1995)

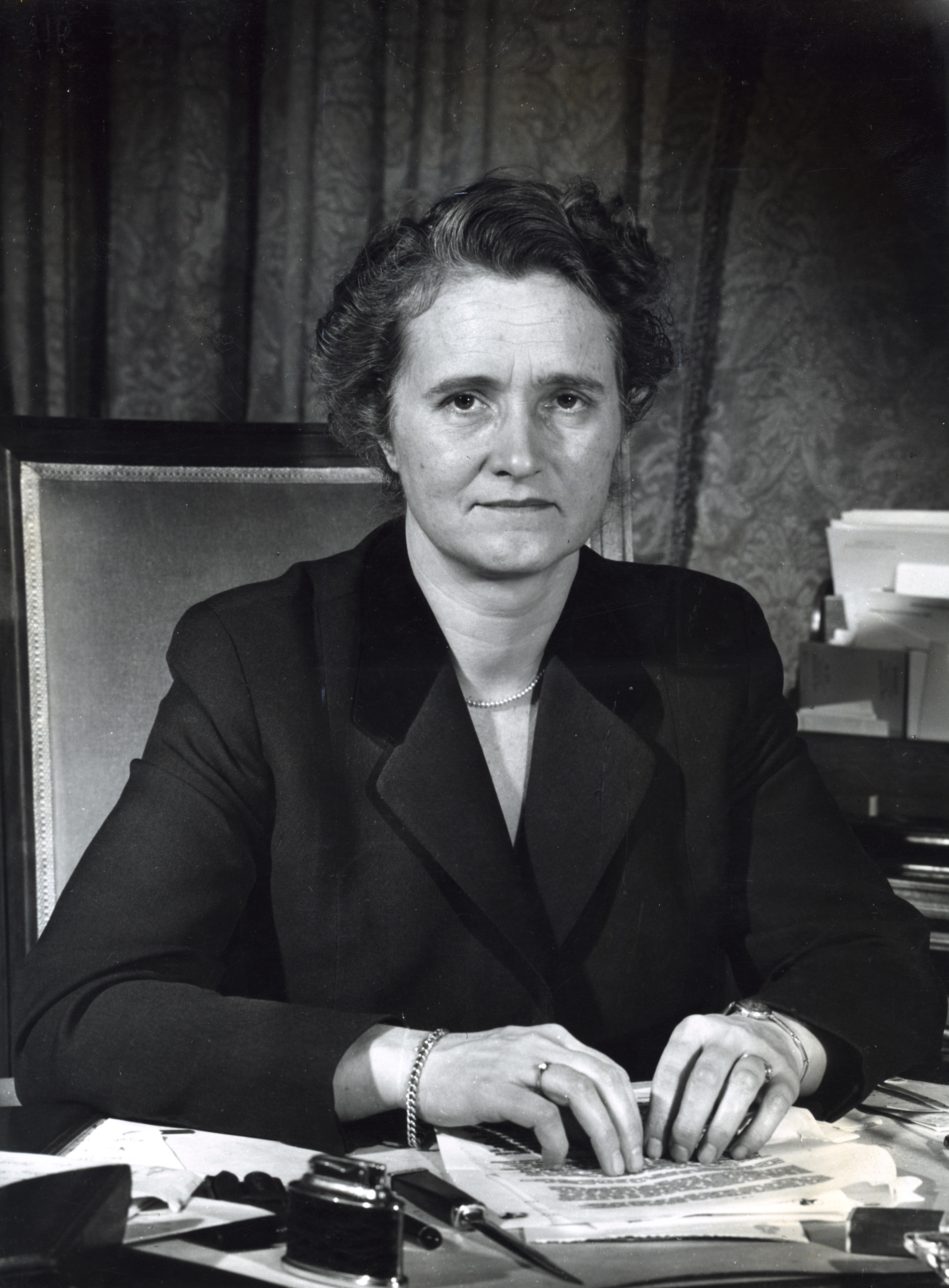
Marga Klompé (1912–1986)

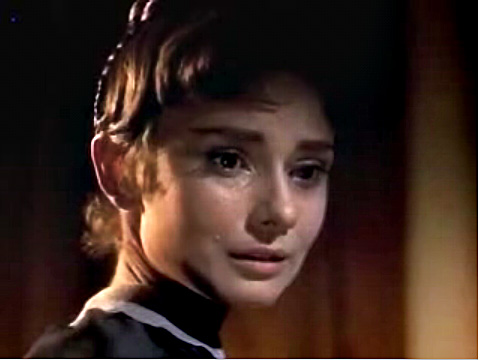
Audrey Hepburn (1929–1993)

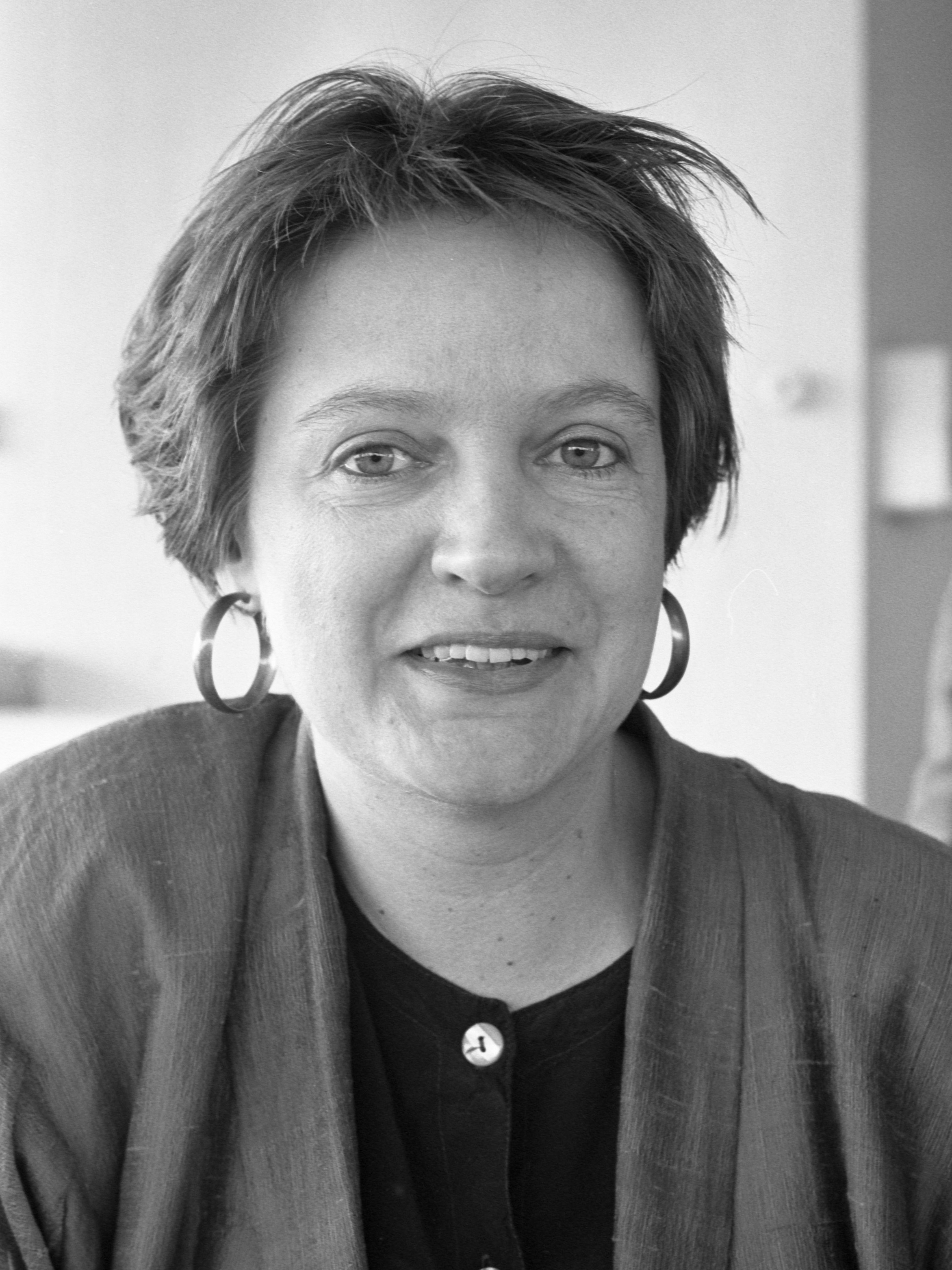
Karin Adelmund (1949–2005)

== Included persons ==
Some of the more prominent women included in the book are:

Name	Lived
Ada, Countess of Holland	ca. 1188-after 1234
Ada van Schotland	ca. 1146-after 1206
Karin Yvonne Irene Jansen Adelmund	1949-2005
Josina Anna Petronella van Aerssen	1733-1797
Countess Albertine Agnes of Nassau	1634-1696
Charlotte Sophie Bentinck	1715-1800
Aleid van Holland	before 1234–1284
Amalia van Saksen-Weimar	1830-1872
Amalia van Solms-Braunfels	1602-1675
Amelberga of Susteren	ca. 900-?
Emmy Eugenie Andriesse	1914-1953
Anna Paulowna	1795-1865
Anna van Egmond	1533-1558
Anna van Hannover	1709-1759
Anna of Austria, Queen of Spain	1549-1580
Countess Anna of Nassau	1563-1588
Anna of Saxony	1544-1577
Lizzy Ansingh	1875-1959
Margo Scharten-Antink	1868-1957
Maria van Antwerpen	1719-1781
Marretje Arents	ca. 1712–1748
Marigje Arriens	ca.1520-1591
Margareta Arjensdr.	ca. 1600-voor 1665
Elisabeth Bas	1571-1649
An Rutgers van der Loeff	1910-1990
Beatrix de Rijke	1421-1468
Johanna Jacoba van Beaumont	ca. 1752–1827
Maria and Ursula van Beckum	d. 1544
Betje Wolff	1738-1804
Eva Bendien	1921-2000
Nelly Anna Benschop	1918-2005
Ariana Nozeman	1626/1628-1661
Titia Bergsma	1786-1821
Bertha van Holland	ca. 1055–1094
Eva Marianna Besnyö	1910-2003
Maria Francisca Bia	1809-1889
Anna Bijns	1493-1575
Agnes Block	1629-1704
Nynke van Hichtum	1860-1939
Gertruid Bolwater	d. 1511?
Ats Bonninga	d. after 1494
Gesina ter Borch	1631-1690
Henriëtte Hilda Bosmans	1895-1952
Alida Bosshardt	1913-2007
Antoinette Bourignon	1616-1680
Jacoba van den Brande	1735-1794
Maria Johanna Braun	1911-1982
Geranda Demphina Brouwenstijn	1915-1999
Ria Beckers	1938-2006
Anna Maria de Bruyn	1708-1744
Carolina Wilhelmina van Oranje-Nassau	1743-1787
Catharina Belgica van Oranje	1578-1648
Catharina van Beieren	ca. 1359–1400
Catharina van Gelre	ca. 1440–1497
Catharina van Kleef	1417-1476
Catharina van Nassau	1543-1624
Christina Chalon	1749-1808
Charlotte de Bourbon	1546/47-1582
Elsje Christiaens	ca. 1646–1664
Marie-Anne Collot	1748-1821
Margaretha Coppier	ca. 1516–1597
Johanna Corleva	1698-1752
Anna van Cronenburg	1552-after 1590
Elisabeth van Culemborg	1475-1555
Julia Bertha Culp	1880-1970
Polly Cuninghame	ca. 1785–1837
Catharina Isabella Dales	1931-1994
Agatha Pieters Deken	1741-1804
Olivia Mariamne Devenish	1771-1814
Foekje Dillema	1926-2007
Geertje Dircks	ca. 1610-1656?
Cornelia Hubertina Doff	1858-1942
Elisabeth Carolina van Dorp	1592?-1657?
Johanna Magdalena Catharina Judith van Dorth	1747-1799
Gerarda Victoria Downer	1926-1980
Mary Dresselhuys	1907-2004
Duveke	1488?-1517
Susanna Maria van der Duyn	1698-1780
Maria Duyst van Voorhout	1662-1754
Anna van Egmont	1504-1574
Eleonora van Engeland	1318-1355
Elisabeth van de Palts	1618-1680
Elisabeth van Engeland	1282-1316
Elisabeth van Oranje	1577-1642
Elizabeth Stuart	1596-1662
Emilia Secunda Antwerpiana van Oranje	1581-1657
Emilia van Oranje	1569-1629
Mariska Veres	1947-2006
Christina Gerardus Enschedé	1791-1873
Elisabeth Françoise Eybers	1915-2007
Sjoerdtsje Faber	1915-1998
Filippa van Henegouwen	1313-1369
Flandrina van Oranje	1579-1640
Anne Frank	1929-1945
Johanna Frederika Franssen	1909-1995
Lotti van der Gaag	1923-1999
Jikke Gaastra	1888-1963
Maria Johanna Gartman	1818-1885
Sonia Gaskell	1904-1974
Susanna van Steenwijk	after 1602-1664?
Ida Gardina Margaretha Gerhardt	1905-1997
Diana Glauber	1650?-after 1721
Margaretha van Godewijk	1627-1677
Cornelia van der Gon	1644-1701
Anna Gonsalves Paes de Azevedo	ca. 1612–1674
Johanna Helena Herolt	1668-after 1723
Maria de Grebber	ca. 1602–1680
Aleida Greve	1670-1742
Susanna Groeneweg	1875-1940
Cissy van Marxveldt	1889-1948
Elisabeth Alida Haanen	1809-1845
Divara van Haarlem	ca. 1511–1535
Hélène Serafia Haasse	1918-2011
Hadewijch	actief ca. 1250-?
Catharina Joanna Maria Halkes	1920-2011
Mata Hari	1876-1917
Kenau Simonsdochter Hasselaer	1526-1588
Henriette Amalia van Anhalt-Dessau	1666-1726
Henriëtte Catharina van Oranje	1637-1708
Florentine Sofie Heubel	1914-2007
Bertha van Heukelom	d. 1322
Catharina Heybeek	1764-1810
Esther Hillesum	1914-1943
Cornelia Catharina Hodshon	1768-1829
Margaretha Hofmans	1894-1968
Mariane Catherine van Hogendorp	1841-1915
Maria Wilhelmina Hendrika Hoitsema	1847-1934
Margaretha van Holland	1234-1276
Anna Cornelia Holt	1671-voor 1706
Sophia Holt	1658-1734
Hortense Eugénie de Beauharnais	1783-1837
Antonina Houbraken	1686-1736
Christina Houbraken	1695-after 1760
Sientje van Houten	1834-1909
Maria Aletta Hulshoff	1781-1846
Maria Dermoût	1888-1962
Isabella van Portugal	1397-1471
Jacoba van Beieren	1401-1436
Aletta Henriëtte Jacobs	ca. 1580-?
Charlotte Jacobs	1847-1916
Aagt Jafies	d. 1572
Anneke Jans	actief 1652–1653
Lucretia Jans	ca. 1602-after 1641
Johanna van Brabant	1322-1406
Johanna van Castilie	1479-1555
Johanna van Valois	ca. 1294-1353?
Juliana of the Netherlands	1909-2004
Juliana of Stolberg	1506-1580
Foelke Kampana	ca. 1355-1417/1419
Kartini	1879-1904
Trijntje Keever	1616-1633
Rosa King	1939-2000
Margaretha Albertina Maria Klompé	1912-1986
Catharina Knibbergen	d. after 1665
Henriëtte Ronner-Knip	1821-1909
Fanny Blankers-Koen	1918-2004
Joanna Koerten	1650-1715
Margaret Kropholler	1891-1966
Wilhelmina Jacoba Pauline Rudolphine Kruseman	1839-1922
Juliana Cornelia de Lannoy	1738-1782
Conny Vandenbos	1937-2002
Susanna van Lee	1630?-1700

Name	Lived
Trijn van Leemput	ca. 1530–1607
Mies Boissevain-van Lennep	1896-1965
Wilhelmina Drucker	1847-1925
Katharina Lescailje	1649-1711
Judith Leyster	1609-1660
Johanna Dorothea Lindenaer	1664-1737?
Aefgen Listincx	d. 1535
Charlotta Elisabeth van der Lith	1700-1753
Maria van Lommen	1688-1742
Mary of Looz-Heinsberg	1424-1502
Louise Augusta Wilhelmina Amalia van Pruisen	1808-1870
Louise de Coligny	1555-1620
Louise Henriette prinses van Oranje	1627-1667
Louise Hollandine prinses van de Palts	1622-1709
Louise Juliana prinses van Oranje	1576-1644
Louise van Oranje-Nassau	1828-1871
Margaret Cavendish, Duchess of Newcastle-upon-Tyne	1623?-1673
Magdalena Hermina Lulofs	1899-1958
Emilie Marguérite Luzac	1748-1788
Adriana Maas	1702-1746
Machteld van Brabant	ca. 1200–1267
Margaretha van Beieren	1363-1424
Margaretha van Bourgondië	1374-1441
Margaretha van Holland	1234-1276
Margaretha van Oostenrijk	1480-1530
Margaretha van Parma	1522-1586
Margaretha van York	1446-1503
Maria Henrietta Stuart I	1631-1661
Maria Louise van Hessen-Kassel	1688-1765
Maria van Nassau (1556–1616)	1556-1616
Maria Stuart II	1662-1694
Maria van Hongarije (1505-1558)	1505-1558
Marianne van Oranje-Nassau	1810-1883
Cornelia van Marle	1661-1698
Eva van Marle	1661-1698
Hendrika Wilhelmina Mastenbroek	1919-2003
Agneta Wilhelmina Johanna Matthes	1847-1909
Margaretha van Mechelen	ca. 1581–1662
Maria ter Meetelen	1704-?
Conny Stuart	1913-2010
Maria Sybilla Merian	1647-1717
Cornelia van der Mijn	1709-after 1772?
Sylvia Millecam	1956-2001
Petronella Moens	1762-1843
Maria Moninckx	1676?-1757
Elisabeth Mooij	1712-1759
Magdalena Moons	1541-1613
Catharina Mulder	1723-1798
Helene Kröller-Müller	1869-1939
Petronella Muns	1794-1842
Johanna Paulina Musters	1878-1895
Gracia Nasi	ca. 1510–1569
Dieuwke IJtje Willemke Nauta	1930-2008
Henriette Amelie de Nerha	d. 1818
Jacoba Maria van Nickelen	1680-1749
Blonde Dolly	1927-1959
Cornelia van Nijenroode	1629-1692?
Mariken van Nimwegen	ca. 1515-
Saint Oda	end 7th-1st half 8th century
Geertrui van Oosten	ca. 1320–1358
Maria van Oosterwijck	1630-1693
Catharina Oostfries	1636?-1708
Willemijntje den Ouden	1918-1997
Henriette Adriana Louise Flora d' Oultremont de Wégimont	1792-1864
Magdalena de Passe	1600-1638
Pauline van Oranje-Nassau	1800-1806
Henriëtta van Pee	1692-1741
Thea Beckman	1923-2004
Petronilla van Saksen	ca. 1082–1144
Plectrudis	d.na 717
Aleid van Poelgeest	ca. 1370–1392
Maria Ponderus	1672-1764
Bauck Poppema	d. 1501
Catharina Questiers	1631-1669
Jurjentje Aukes Rauwerda	1812-1877
Hanna van Recklinghausen	voor 1332-after 1349
Trijntje Johannes Reidinga	1799-1869
Christina Reinira van Reede	1776-1847
Trijn Rembrands	ca. 1557–1638
Richardis van Wittelsbach	ca. 1174–1232
Suze Robertson	1855-1922
Johanna Bordewijk-Roepman	1892-1971
Geertruydt Roghman	1625-after 1651
Magdalena Roghman	1637-after 1669
Catharina Rose	d. after 1587
Sara Rothé	1699-1751
Katharina Rozee	1632-1682
Renate Ida Rubinstein	1929-1990
Audrey Hepburn	1929-1993
Wilhelmina Jacoba Ruys	1904-1999
Anna Ruysch	1666-1754
Rachel Ruysch	1664-1750
Sara Saftleven	1645/1650?-1702
Elisabeth Samson	1715-1771
Margaretha Sandra	1629-1674
Hannie Schaft	1920-1945
Maria Schalcken	1645/1650-v??r 1700
Henriette Roland Holst	1869-1952
Cornelia Scheffer	1830-1899
Lidwina van Schiedam	1380-1433
Annie M.G. Schmidt	1911-1995
Teddy Scholten	1926-2010
Maria van Schooten	ca. 1555–1573
Anna Maria van Schurman	1607-1678
Thérèse Schwartze	1851-1918
Isabelle de Charrière (Belle van Zuylen)	1740-1805
Weyn Ockers	d. 1568
Swob Sjaarda	ca. 1435–1520
Johanna Elisabeth Smit	1933-1981
Sophia van Rheineck	ca. 1115–1176
Sophie Hedwig van Brunswijk-Wolfenbüttel	1592-1642
Sophie van de Palts	1630-1714
Sophie van Oranje-Nassau	1824-1897
Sophie van Württemberg	1818-1877
Maria van Spanje	1759?-after 1782
Adriana Spilberg	1656-after 1697
het Vrouwtje van Stavoren	before 1500
Hendrickje Stoffels	1626/1627-1663
Maria Swanenburg	1839-1915
Bartholda van Swieten	1566-1647
Theophanu	ca. 960–991
Madame Therese	active 1706/1729-?
Petronella Johanna de Timmerman	1723/1724-1786
Alexine Tinne	1835-1869
Adriana van Tongeren	1691?-1764
Charley Toorop	1891-1955
Cornelia Toppen	1730-1800
Anna Louisa Geertruida Toussaint	1812-1886
Sara Troost	1732-1803
Saskia Uylenburgh	1612-1642
M. Vasalis	1909-1998
Cornelia van der Veer	1639-1704
Catharina Jacoba van Velde	1903-1985
Maria Verelst	1680-1744
Annie Romein-Verschoor	1895-1978
Ida Saint-Elme	1776-1845
Anna Visscher	1584-1652
Maria Tesselschade Visscher	1594-1649
Elizabeth Vuijk	1905-1991
Anna de Waal	1906-1981
Lucy Walter	1630-1658
Elisabeth Wandscherer	d. 1535
Elisabeth Geertruida Wassenbergh	1729-1781
Johanna Cornelia Wattier	1762-1827
Maria Weenix	1697-1774
Lia Dorana	1918-2010
Sophia Maria Westendorp	1916-2004
Trijntje Pieters Westra	1783-1861
Maria de Wilde	1682-1729
Wilhelmina of the Netherlands	1880-1962
Wilhelmine of Prussia, Queen of the Netherlands	1774-1837
Wilhelmina of Prussia, Princess of Orange	1751-1820
Alida Withoos	ca. 1661–1730
Maria Withoos	1663-after 1699
Jacomina de Witte	1582-1661
Maria Petronella Woesthoven	1760-1830
Aleijda Wolfsen	1648-1692
Margaretha Wulfraet	1678-1760
Geertje Wyntges	1636-1712
het Meisje van Yde	na 54 v. C.-voor 128 n. C.
Clara de Vries	1915–1942
Maria van Zuylekom	1759–1831
