= Aerm Ariaentje =

Dutch woman known for her longevity

Aerm Ariaentje, also known as Adriana (born c. 1516; buried on 12 August 1624 in Zutphen), was a Dutch woman known for her longevity.

A children's street song was composed about her and several historical works have been written about her. She is adopted in the 1001 Vrouwen uit de Nederlandse geschiedenis; 1001 biographies of famous women of the Netherlands.

== Biography ==
Despite living in poverty, Ariaentje reportedly never lacked necessities. Her nickname "Aerm" derives from the Dutch word arm, meaning "poor." She lived as a kostkoper, a resident who paid for board and care, in a proveniershuis or poorhouse. She never married. Until her death, she was said to retain "the full use of all her senses and her cheerfulness." She died in August 1624 and was buried on 12 August in Zutphen. There is some inconsistency among sources regarding her exact age, but the most reliable account appears to be from the preacher Willem Baudartius (1598–1640). Reportedly astonished by her age, he is said to have commissioned the following Latin inscription on her gravestone: "Virgo Adriana jacet tumulo tumulata sub isto / centenos septemque annos quae vixit, et ultra." (Translation: "Under this stone lies buried a maiden of one hundred years, and to that seven more. Believe it freely, for it is true.") Her estate at death consisted of a debt of four stuivers, a small amount, likely owed for boarding at the institution.

== Legacy ==
A children's street song was composed about her. Around a hundred years after her death, Dutch historian François Halma included a section titled Adriana in his 1725 work Tooneel der Vereenigde Nederlanden ("Theatre of the United Netherlands"), which featured stories of very old people. Her story continued to be cited in other works over time including reference works by Chalmot and Jan Christiaan Kobus / W. de Rivecourt. She is adopted in the 1001 Vrouwen uit de Nederlandse geschiedenis; 1001 biographies of famous women of the Netherlands.
