= Cornelia Teelinck =

Dutch Reformed writer and poet (1554–1577)

- Born: 1554; Zierikzee, County of Zeeland, Habsburg Netherlands
- Died: before 21 January 1577 (aged 22–23); Middelburg, Dutch Republic
- Occupations: Writer, poet
- Spouse: Anthonie Limmens
- Children: 1 daughter
- Writing career
- Notable work: Een corte belijdenisse des geloofs (1625)

Cornelia Eeuwoutsdr. Teelinck (1554 – January 1577) was a Dutch Reformed writer and poet from Zierikzee in the County of Zeeland, known for her devotional writings and her role as an early female voice in the Reformed movement.

== Personal life ==
Teelinck was born in 1554 in Zierikzee, the youngest of four children in a prominent and literate family. Her father, Eewoud Teelinck, was a beer brewer and magistrate in the city and owned a library with books in Latin, French, and German. He died in 1561, leaving a substantial estate.

Though her family was originally Catholic, Cornelia and her siblings converted to the Reformed faith during the 1570s, a time of significant religious transformation in the Netherlands.

In 1575, Cornelia married Anthonie Limmens (also spelled Lammers or Lumers), a pious merchant from Antwerp. The couple lived in Antwerp, but Anthonie died only two years later, in 1577. Cornelia died five weeks after him, reportedly in Middelburg, at the age of 22 or 23.

Their infant daughter, Katrijnken, was brought back to Zierikzee in January 1577, according to records from the city's orphan chamber.

== Writings and religious life ==
Around 1573, at the age of 19, Teelinck composed a personal confession of faith and submitted it to the church council of Zierikzee as part of her application to receive communion. This confession, written in Dutch, was later published posthumously by her sister Susanna Teelinck in 1607 due to increasing demand for copies.

The booklet, titled Een corte belijdenisse des geloofs ("A Short Confession of Faith"), was widely read, and its fifth edition appeared in 1625. It remains the only surviving collection of her writings and is held in the library of Leiden University.

The 1625 edition also included several short devotional poems composed by Teelinck, particularly lamentations written after the death of her husband.

== Legacy ==
Though her life and output were brief, Cornelia Teelinck became a notable figure in early Dutch religious literature. Her posthumously published confession circulated widely in the early 17th century and was praised for its clarity and devotion.

Her writings contributed to the spread of Reformed piety, particularly among women, during a crucial period in the history of Dutch Protestantism.

Cornelia's family remained influential in religious circles. Her brother Joost Teelinck served as mayor of Zierikzee and his son Willem Teelinck became a prominent pietist preacher.

She is adopted into the works 1001 Vrouwen uit de Nederlandse geschiedenis; a compilation of 1001 biographies of famous women of the Netherlands.

== Selected works ==
- Een corte belijdenisse des geloofs (written c. 1573, published posthumously in 1607; 5th ed. 1625)
