= Els Kloek =

Dutch historian (born 1952)

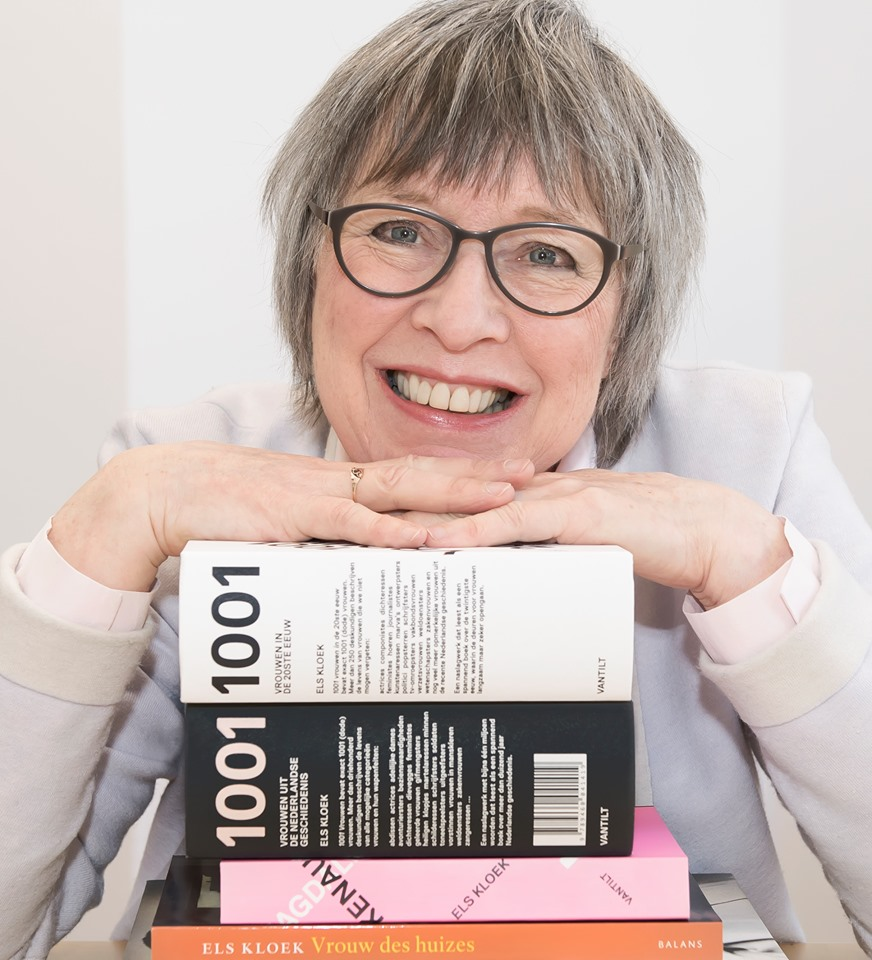
- Els Kloek in 2019, picture Monique Kooijmans
- Born: 18 July 1952 (age 74); Leiden
- Occupation: historian
- Writing career
- Genre: Women's history
- Website: www.elskloek.nl

Else Margaretha (Els) Kloek (born 18 July 1952, Leiden) is a Dutch historian and writer specialising in women's history.

== Biography ==
Inspired by Annie M.G. Schmidt, in her youth Kloek aspired to become a poet. Having completed the Stedelijk Gymnasium Leiden, she studied history at the University of Amsterdam, graduating with a PhD in 1990. She lectured at the universities of Utrecht, Nijmegen, and Rotterdam. She was the initiator and editor-in-chief of the popular science series "Verloren Verleden" (Lost Past). Between 1998 and 2004, 24 books in this series were published about famous people and episodes from Dutch history.

From 2003 until 2014, Kloek was affiliated with the Huygens Institute for the History of the Netherlands, part of the Royal Netherlands Academy of Arts and Sciences. In this capacity, she oversaw the establishment of the Digital Women's Lexicon of the Netherlands and the reference work 1001 Vrouwen uit de Nederlandse geschiedenis (1001 Women From Dutch History). Since 2008, she was project leader of the Biografisch Portaal ((Biography Portal). Since 2014 she has been an independent historian, and a visiting researcher at the institute. Kloek subsequently served as editor-in-chief of 1001 vrouwen in de 20ste eeuw (1001 Women in the 20th Century), published in 2018.

== Works ==
Kloek authored or co-authored the following books, amongst othe works.

- Vrouwen en kinderen eerst [Women and Children First] (Nijmegen, 2019)
- Keetje Hodshon (1768–1829). Een rijke dame in revolutietijd [Keetje Hodshon (1768–1829). A Wealthy Lady in Revolutionary Times] (Nijmegen, 2017) [co-authored by Maarten Hell]
- 101 Vrouwen en de oorlog [101 Women and the War] (Nijmegen, 2016)
- Kenau & Magdalena. Vrouwen in de Tachtigjarige Oorlog [Kenau and Magdalena. Women in the Eighty Years' War] (Nijmegen, 2014)
- Vrouw des huizes. Een cultuurgeschiedenis van de Hollandse huisvrouw [Lady of the House. A Cultural History of Dutch Housewives] (Amsterdam, 2009)
- Wie hij zij, man of wijf. Vrouwengeschiedenis en de vroegmoderne tijd. Drie Leidse studies [Who He Should Be, Man or Woman/Wife. Women's History and the Early Modern Period. Three Leiden Studies] (Hilversum, 1990; dissertation)

== Awards and nominations ==
- 2010 Nominated for Libris Geschiedenis Prijs 2010 for Vrouw des huizes
- 2013 Nominated for Libris Geschiedenis Prijs 2013 for 1001 Vrouwen uit de Nederlandse geschiedenis
- 2016 1001 Vrouwen uit de Nederlandse geschiedenis proclaimed 'best history book of all time' by readres of Historisch Nieuwsblad [Historical Magazine]
- 2018 Appointed honorary member of the tot erelid van de Maatschappij der Nederlandse Letterkunde [Society of Dutch Literature]
- 2019 Winner of the Kleio Klasseprijs 2019 for 1001 Vrouwen in de 20ste eeuw by the Vereniging van docenten geschiedenis en staatsinrichting in Nederland (VNG, Association of Teachers History and State Organisation in the Netherlands; including a monetary prize and a certificate of honour)
