= DVN =

DVN may refer to:

- Da Vinci's Notebook, an a cappella group
- Davenport Municipal Airport (Iowa) (IATA/FAA code)
- Davenport (Stockport) railway station
- Devon Energy, an American oil and gas company (NYSE stock symbol)
- Digitaal Vrouwenlexicon van Nederland, a digital Who's Who of Dutch women
