= Johanna Jacoba van Beaumont =

Dutch journalist, feminist and editor

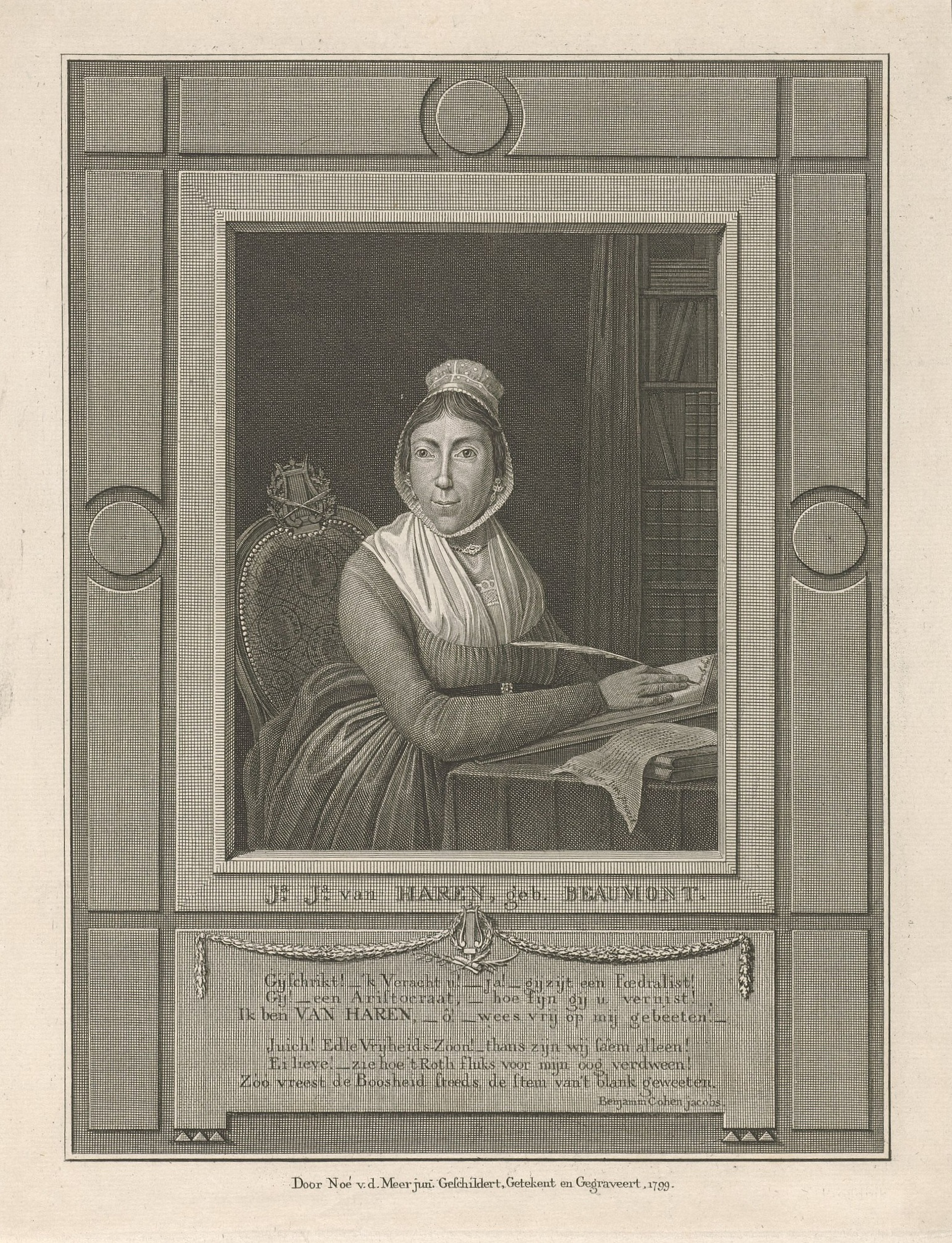
Portrait of Johanna Jacoba van Beaumont by Noach van der Meer

Johanna Jacoba van Beaumont (c. 1752, Sluis – 17 October 1827, Bergen op Zoom), was a politically active Dutch journalist, feminist and editor.

She belonged to the radical democrats who were active in the radical paper Nationaale Bataafsche Courant after the Batavian Revolution of 1795. In 1797, she organised a list of names which she delivered to the national parliament in support of a radically democratic constitution wherein she suggested women should be willing to fight to the death for a democratically centralized system. She signed with the name "Catharina" which led to her colleague Catharina Heybeek being arrested in 1798 for incitement in the place of Johanna.

In 1799, Beaumont organised a petition in which she pleaded to reformulate an article in the Batavian constitution which included the right for women to participate in the political system. Her request, which was signed bij 198 women, was denied by parliament.

== Bibliography ==
- historici.nl
