= Anneke Ogiers =

Dutch Lutheran executed for heresy in 1570

Anneke Ogiers, also known as Anneke Jans and Tanneke Ogier, (died 17 June 1570 in Haarlem) was a Dutch Lutheran, who was executed for heresy by the Spanish authorities. She was reported to the Spaniards by the infamous informer Aagt Jafies, and was executed by drowning. Her case belongs to the more famous of the victims of the Spanish heresy persecutions during the Dutch war of liberation, and was used in propaganda as a Protestant martyr.

Anneke Ogiers was the daughter of Jan Ogiersz and married the wealthy craftsman Adriaan Boogaert in Haarlem. She seldom attended the Catholic mass, which was mandatory during the Spanish rule, and Aagt Jafies, who was infamous for reporting heresy to the authorities, was informed by the maidservant of Anneke Ogiers that Ogiers read the Bible each Sunday instead of attending mass. Aagt Jafies initially attempted blackmail, but when Ogiers refused to submit to blackmail, Aagt Jafies reported her to Jacob Foppens. She confessed to having been baptized a Lutheran in 1557. After the investigation found her to be a Lutheran, she was sentenced to death for heresy. Foppens demanded her to be executed by burning, as was normal for heretics. She was however pardoned from being burned at the stake in public, and was instead commuted to being drowned inside the city hall instead. Her case was describe in the Martelaersspiegel, where she was included among the martyrs.
