= Cornelia Toppen =

Dutch organist and riot instigator

Cornelia Toppen, known as Keet Zwenke (1730 - 6 March 1800), was a Dutch Orangist and the instigator of the 1784 riots of Rotterdam.

Toppen was born in Beekbergen. In 1755 she married Boatswain Jan Reijnier Zwenke. During the political riots between Orangists and Patriots in Rotterdam in 1784, Toppen was the leader of the Orangists; Jan Jacob Elsevier was the leader of the Patriots. She was imprisoned and fined for crime against the order of the state. She died in Rotterdam.
