= Madelon Szekely-Lulofs =

Dutch writer and journalist

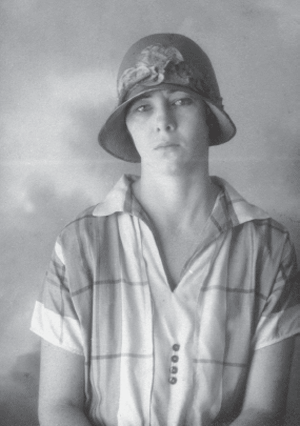
Székely-Lulofs, c. 1920

Madelon Szekely-Lulofs (24 June 1899 in Surabaya – 22 May 1958 in Santpoort) was a Dutch writer and journalist, best known for writing novels that were set in the former Dutch East Indies, now Indonesia.

== Biography ==
Szekely-Lulofs was born on 24 June 1899 as Madelon (Magdalena) Hermine (Hermina) Lulofs in the Oranje Hotel in Surabaya on the island of Java (then Dutch East Indies now Indonesia). She was the eldest daughter of Claas Lulofs, a civil servant in the Dutch East Indies and Sarah Christina Dijckmeester, whose families both originated from Deventer, Netherlands. Her father achieved the rank of Resident of Dutch New Guinea. In 1912 Madelon Lulofs was sent by her parents to follow secondary school in Deventer, where she lived with her grandmother.

After her first marriage in 1917 to a Dutch rubber planter, Hendrik Doffegnies, she moved to Deli on the island of Sumatra. From her first marriage she had two daughters, Mary Maud Doffegnies and Christine Doffegnies. She read a lot and started to write herself but her husband was not much interested in her writing. When she met another writer, Lászlo Székely, a Hungarian, who worked on the same plantation, she showed her first work to him and they became lovers. Székely then was instrumental to publish her stories in a local newspaper in Sumatra. When her husband discovered her adultery, he sent her and her daughters for one year to Australia, but when Madelon returned to Deli in 1925 she still was in love with Székely. She divorced Hendrik Doffegnies in 1926 and in the same year married Lászlo Székely in Hungary. This created a scandal in the Dutch Indonesian society. In 1927 the couple returned to Sumatra and Székely was offered a job on the same plantation where her first husband, Doffegnies, was working. From her second marriage another daughter Clothilde Malvina Székely was born in March 1929. The return to Sumatra was not a success, so they departed to Europe in 1930 where they first settled in Budapest.

After her first novel, Rubber, was published in 1931, she became a famous writer. Life on a rubber plantation in Deli and her own life experiences formed the base of her story. Before the 1930s planting of rubber in the Dutch East Indies reached a peak, but in 1930 disaster struck and many people in that industry lost their jobs and faced bankruptcy. Rubber was translated in many languages and turned into a play and a film.

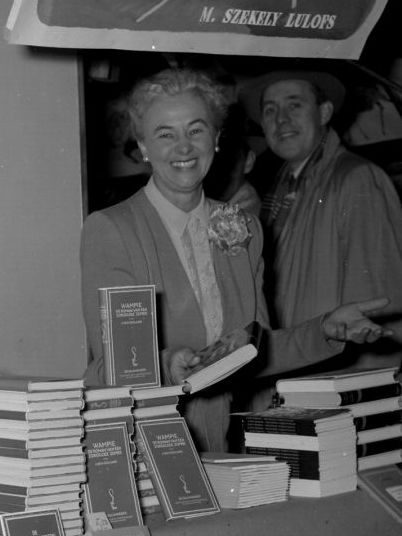
Madelon Székely-Lulofs on 1 March 1952

In 1938 with the danger of the Second World War approaching, the Székely family moved from Hungary to Santpoort, Netherlands, but in 1941 Lászlo returned to Hungary. Being a Jew, he didn't want to compromise his family. Lászlo Székely survived the war, but he died on April 14, 1946, in Hungary just before his departure to the Netherlands. In the 1940s Székely-Lulofs published some new books, but in the fifties she produced mainly translations into Dutch, from English by Pearl S. Buck and Margaret Campbell Barnes, but also from Hungarian (Zsolt Harsányi, Jolán Földes) and German. In 1958 on 22 May, while shopping in Amsterdam, Székely-Lulofs suffered a heart attack from which she died.

Many of her works as mentioned below give some of her personal life stories.

== Bibliography ==
=== Rubber and Coolie ===
After Rubber (published in Dutch and English in 1931), another novel was published in 1932: Koelie (or Coolie in English). Rubber is part her own life story and part fiction. It gives insight into the life of the colonial planters and makes the reader aware of the conflicts between the Indonesian population and the colonial (Dutch) oppressor. Coolie is a story how young healthy Javanese were shanghaied to trick them into working for the rubber plantations in Sumatra. Reality and story have been mixed in this novel.

=== The other world ===
De andere wereld ('The Other World') is a 1934 novel about a poor downtrodden boy from Amsterdam, Pieter Pots, who gets a job on a rubber plantation in Deli, Sumatra and the world he is going to live in as a colonial white skinned person compared to the very poor life he has led in Amsterdam. It also shows that money does not buy everything. His njai (Indonesian housekeeper annex concubine) gives him more understanding and love than his Dutch wife. In the end he returns to Indonesia and to his njai.

=== Tjoet Nja Dhien ===
This is a historic novel published in Dutch in 1948 about a noblewoman from Atjeh in northern Sumatra. It describes the war between the local people and the Dutch colonial power in the period 1873-1914, of which the difference in religion also played a part. This book was written in a very different style.

=== Doekoen ===
Doekoen (Dukun) appeared as a serial in the weekly ladies' magazine Margriet (1952-1953). It was only published as a book in 2001 by KITLV publishers in Leiden. This novel portrays the difference between the Dutch physician and the local witch doctor with all its differences and difficulties.

=== Meeting the Dead ===
In 2011 two of Székely-Lulofs's grandsons, Michael Walker and Willem-Ewoud Modderman, published some stories (found in an old trunk) for the first time in the Dutch language, with the title Ontmoeting met de Dood (Meeting the Dead) at Conserve publishers.

== Publications (in English) ==
- Madelon H. Lulofs: Coolie. Transl. G.J. Renier and Irene Clephane. London, Cassell & Co, 1936
- Madelon H. Lulofs: The other world. Transl. G.J. Renier and Irene Clephane. New York, Viking Press, 1935
- Madelon H. Lulofs: The wealthy beggar. Transl. G.D.H. Pidcock. London, Cassell, 1935 (=other transl. of De andere wereld)
- Madelon Lulofs: Rubber. A romance of the Dutch East Indies. Transl. G. J. Renier and Irene Clephane. London, Cassell & Co, 1933. American Edition: White Money, New York : The Century Co, 1933. Later edition: Oxford University Press, 1991. ISBN 978-0195888676
