= Maria ter Meetelen =

Dutch writer

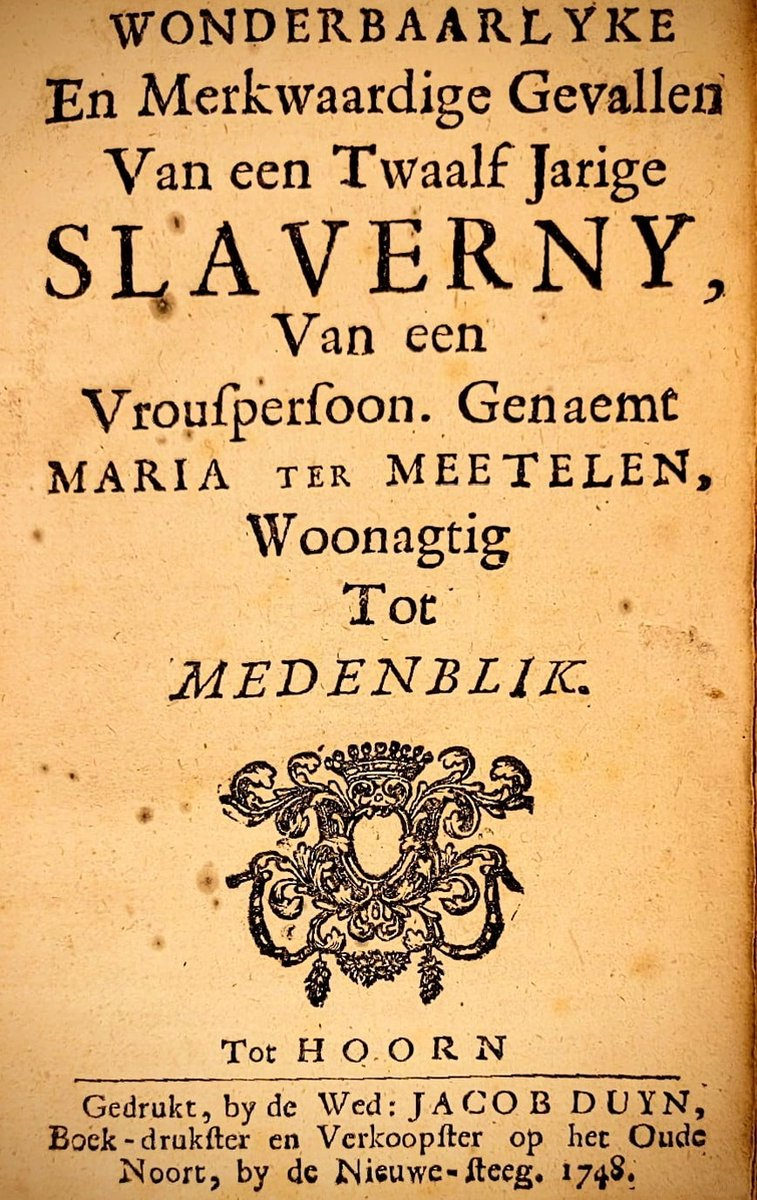
1748 book by Maria ter Meetelen

Maria ter Meetelen (20 June 1704, Amsterdam – fl. 1751), was a Dutch writer, famous for writing an autobiographical slave narrative of her years as a slave in Morocco, having been taken captive by Corsair pirates. Her biography is considered to be a valuable witness statement of the life of a former slave (1748).

== Life ==
Ter Meetelen was a child from the slum. She enlisted in the Spanish army disguised as a man in 1725. After this, she lived in Spain as a nun until she married the Dutch captain Claes van der Meer.

The couple was on a ship destined for the Netherlands in 1731, when it was captured by Moroccan pirates. All crew and passengers were brought to Morocco, first to Salé and then to Meknès, to be sold as slaves. Ter Meetelen and her husband became possession of the sultan Abdallah of Morocco. Her spouse died, and to avoid being taken to the sultan's harem, she refused to convert to Islam, and feigned pregnancy. Ultimately, she was allowed to marry the spokesperson of the sultan's slaves, the Dutchman Pieter Janszoon Iede. The couple provided the non-Muslim slaves with alcohol and lived quite well at the court. Through her social and diplomatic skills, Ter Meetelen was able to maintain her favorable position under succeeding rulers.

In 1743, Ter Meetelen, her husband and two children were bought free by the Dutch state, together with many other Dutch slaves, and they returned to the Dutch Republic.

The final trace we have of her is a 1751 document stating that Ter Meetelen, widowed again, had the intention of migrating to the Cape Colony.

== Works ==
- Maria ter Meetelen, The Curious and Amazing Adventures of Maria ter Meetelen; Twelve Years a Slave (1731- 43), Translated and Introduced by Caroline Stone. (Hardinge Simpole, 2010). .
