= Maria Petronella Woesthoven =

Dutch poet

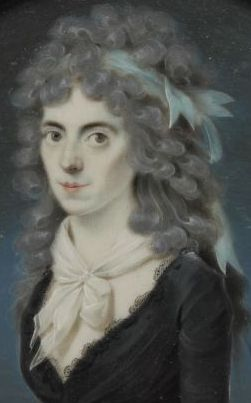
Maria Woesthoven, by Leonardus Temminck

Maria Petronella Woesthoven (25 October 1760 – 26 January 1830) was a Dutch poet.

== Life ==
Woesthoven was born in Dantumawoude, the daughter of military Johannes Woesthoven.

She was a member of the academy Amsteldamse Dicht- en Letteroefenend Genootschap (1786), and the Kunst Wordt door Arbeid Verkregen. She participated in the board meetings in 1790–94 and was a member of the executive committee in 1793–94 and as such she received the highest position in the hierarchy awarded to any non-royal Dutch woman at the time.

She was awarded a gold medal for her poem Amsteldamse (1787), and silver medals for Kunstliefde Spaart Geen Vlijt (1788), and De invloed van een vast geloof aan de voorzienigheid (1789).

She was married in 1785 to the clerk Samuel Elter; at the divorce in 1803 she was judged as the guilty party after her husband claimed she had intercourse with other men, but was awarded custody of their son, which was unusual for similar cases. She died, aged 69, in Amsterdam.

== Sources ==
- Dini M. Helmers, Woesthoven, Maria Petronella, in: Digitaal Vrouwenlexicon van Nederland. [13 January 2014]
