= Maria van Lommen =

Maria van Lommen (15 January 1688 – August 14 1742), was a Dutch gold- and silversmith and guildmember.

She was the daughter of silversmith Cornelis van Lommen (1656–1715) and Cornelia Enligt Merck (1667–1724). In 1712, she became a member of the silversmiths guild and she and her mother took over the gold- and silversmith business of her father. They became so successful that their competitors stated a complaint to the authorities that there was a risk that the rest of the silversmiths in Utrecht were in danger of being ruined. In 1730, she was inducted into the guild of the goldsmiths. Her great success as a business woman, unusual for her gender during her era, are also unusually well documented, and she is often referred to as an example for the many more anonymous professional women in the history of the Netherlands.
