= Maria Schalcken =

Dutch artist (1645–1699)

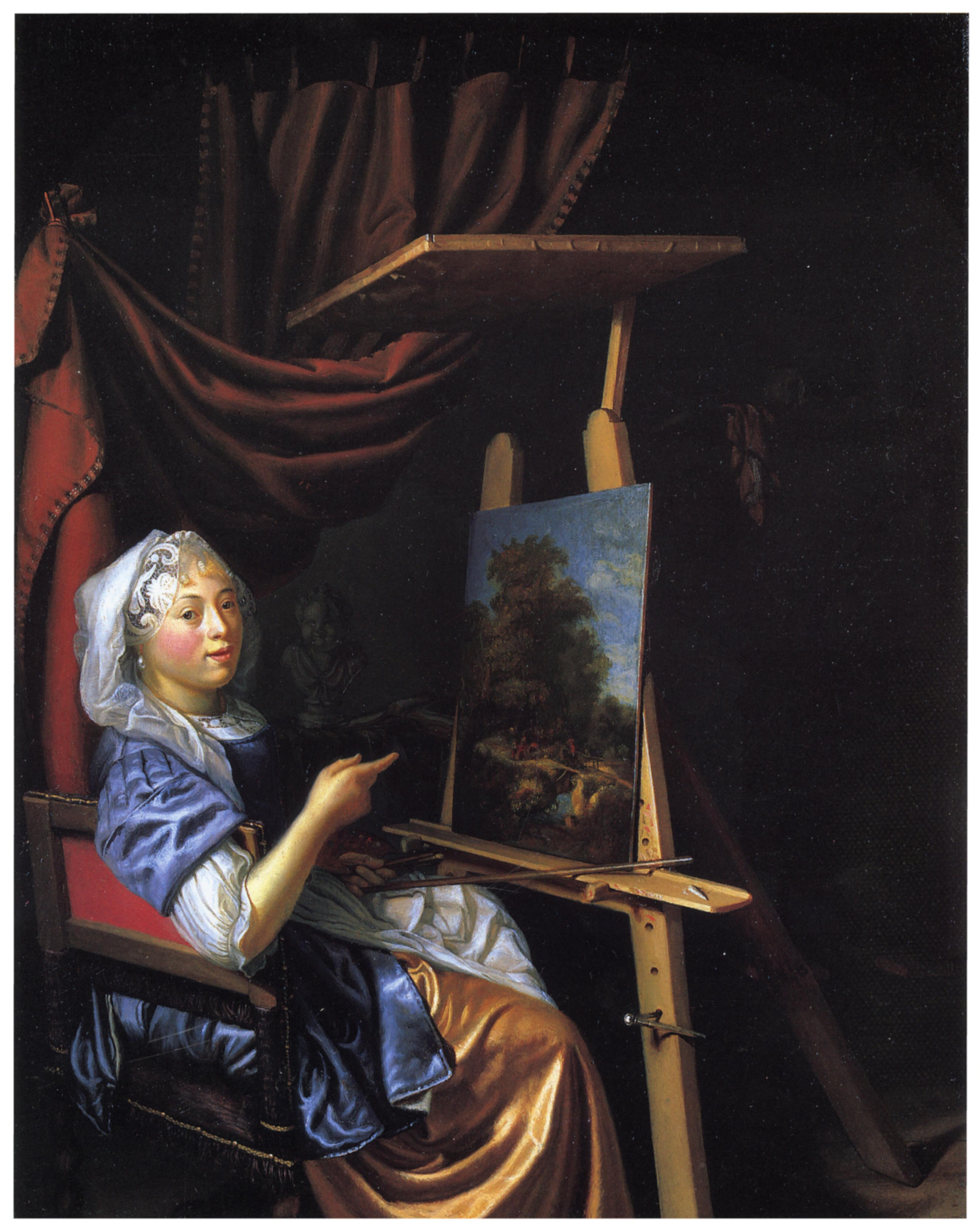
Self-portrait

Maria Schalcken (1645–1699), was a Dutch Golden Age painter. She was a sister and pupil of Godfried Schalcken.

== Biography ==
She was born in Dordrecht, the daughter of the rector of the school there. She was the younger sister of the painter Godfried Schalcken, who first learned to paint from Samuel van Hoogstraten and later from Gerard Dou. She is thought to have begun her studies around 1665, but gave up the practice in 1682 upon marriage to the merchant Severijn van Bracht.

According to the Nederlands Instituut voor Kunstgeschiedenis (RKD) she is known for genre works. Her self-portrait was attributed to her brother until it was cleaned in the 20th century and her full signature appeared. There is one other known work by her hand entitled Boy Offering Grapes to a Woman which resides in the Leiden Collection, but historians suspect that other works currently attributed to her brother may have been executed by her. She died in Dordrecht around 1700.

Boy offering grapes to a woman (attr. to Maria Schalcken)

Woman at her toilet
