= Trijn Rembrands =

Trijn Rembrands (c. 1557–1638) was a woman involved in the events of the Spanish Siege of Alkmaar during the Eighty Years' War in 1573, when she allegedly served in the defence as a soldier.

She was married to the textile merchant Cornelis Reyersz. In 1661 described as an example of both men and women fighting with equal bravery during the war: public memorial ceremonies were held for her in 1777 and 1865, and she is the subject of an opera, Alkmaar Trijn.

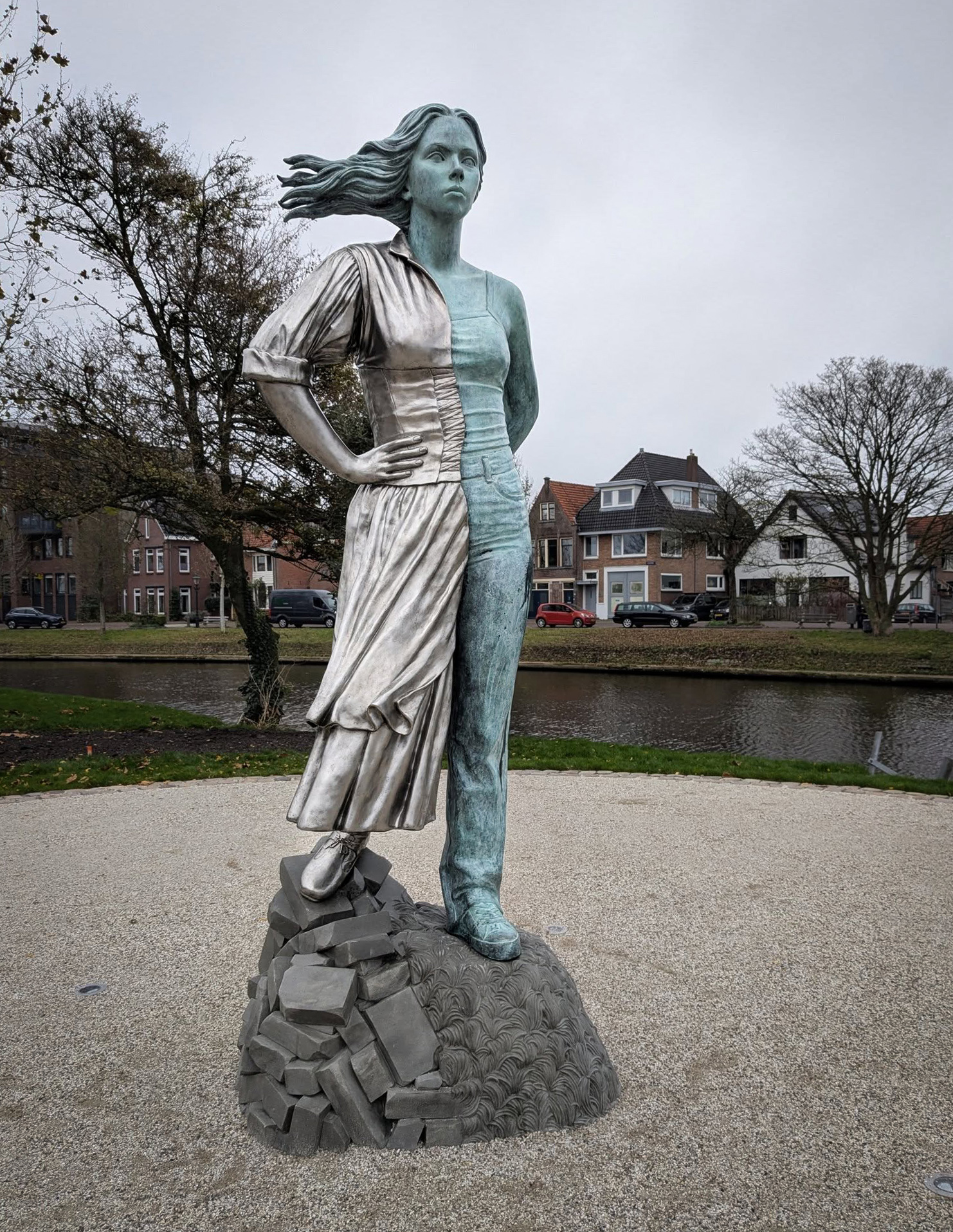
The statue of Trijn Rembrands by Elisabet Stienstra on the Victoriepad in Alkmaar, the Netherlands
