= Gertruid Bolwater =

Gertruid (Truuj) Bolwater (died 1511) was a legendary Dutch heroine, known as the defender of Venlo during its siege by Emperor Maximilian I when she climbed up the defence wall of the city and took over the defence wall from a fallen ensign.

== Patriotic symbol ==
She was an important symbol for local patriotism during the 19th century, and has been the subject of publications since the 17th century. Nowadays, however, historians have decided that she was a symbol and not a real person.

== Folklore ==
During the southern Dutch carnival, on the Thursday before the main event, in the city of Venlo is an all women festivity called Truujendaag in local dialect. It is said to be referring to the heroine. During this day, women dress in medieval clothes and roam the city. No men are allowed to show themselves. If they do, their tie is cut in half.

== Recognition ==
In recognition of her (alleged) heroic act, a street in the city center was named after her. She also is getting a much criticized clay statue.
