= Johanna Dorothea Lindenaer =

Johanna Dorothea Lindenaer, also Johanna Dorothea Zoutelande or Madame de Zoutelandt, (1664–1737) was a Dutch writer, memoirist and translator. She was also a suspected traitor as a suspected spy.

She was arrested in 1703 under the name dowager Van Domburg in Maastricht for spying in connection to the war of the Spanish succession, but managed to escape in 1704. She emigrated to Paris, where she converted to Roman Catholicism and became a writer.

== Works ==
- Aanwijsing der heilsame politike gronden en maximen (translation)
- Memoires (1710) - memoirs
- La Babylone demasquée (1727)
