= Maria van Zuylekom =

Dutch poet and author (1759–1831)

- Born: 29 July 1759; Den Haag, Kingdom of the Netherlands
- Died: 7 April 1831 (aged 71); Den Haag, Kingdom of the Netherlands
- Spouse: Jacob Eduard de Witte (m. 1790)
- Children: 4
- Writing career
- Pen name: MvZ or MDW

Maria van Zuylekom (29 July 1759 – 7 April 1831) was a Dutch poet and writer.

== Biography ==
Van Zuylekom was born on 29 July 1759 in Tedingerbroek (now known as Den Haag), Kingdom of the Netherlands. Her parents were Jan van Zuylekom and Agnita van Zuylekom (née Ameur). Her mother giving birth to her younger sister Theodora Aletta when van Zuylekom was aged 2. Her father remarried to Johanna ter Brake, who raised van Zuylekom and her siblings.

Van Zuylekom worked as a companion and started writing. She was inspired by Margaret Geertruid de Cambon-van der Werken and considered that her works demonstrated that female authorship was as valuable as male authorship. Van Zuylebom was a member of the poetry society Kunstliefde Spaart Geen Vlijt in Den Haag from 1788. In 1786, Van Zuylekon had dedicated her work Mengelingen in Prosa en Poëzy to the society. She was also a member of the society Vlijt is de Voedster der Wetenschappen in Utrecht from 1789.

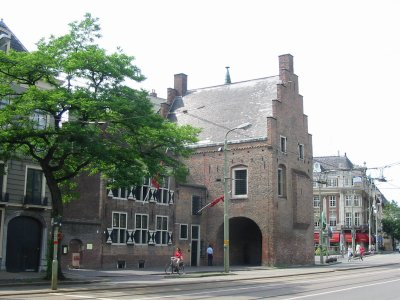
Gevangenpoort in Den Haag

After regularly visiting him during his imprisonment at the Gevangenpoort (Prisoner's Gate) in Den Haag, van Zuylekom became the partner of ensign infantry and writer Jacob Eduard de Witte, who was serving a six-year sentence for treason. She allowed herself to be locked in prison with him every evening. In the prison, Van Zuylekom and de Witte wrote the epistolary novel Henriëtte van Grandpré (1789) together. Collaboration between two authors was fashionable in the Netherlands during the late eighteenth-century.

After de Witte was released from prison, he married van Zuylekom on 24 May 1790 in Rosmalen, North Brabant. They had four children together, including two daughters who were known to have had a good education and a son who enlisted as a second lieutenant in the Dutch military.

The young family moved frequently and lived in Haarlem, Oss, Rosmalen, Zaltbommel and Zuidlaren. De Witte was exiled from the Netherlands and was imprisoned in Alkmaar, North Holland, in 1802 for repeatedly breaking his banishment. Van Zuylekom requested residence in Alkmaar as a burgess which was granted by the Committee of General Welfare of the city on 8 May 1802.

In 1813, van Zuylekom released two publications in Amsterdam: Lierzang aan mijne Landgenooten, in Slachtmaand 1813 and Opwekking aan de Nederlanders, Lierzang.

Van Zuylekom died on 7 April 1831 in Den Haag, aged 71.

== Publications ==
- Mengelingen in Prosa en Poëzy (Den Hague, 1786)
- Henriëtte van Grandpré (Leiden, 1789)
- Osman en Ophelia (1790)
- Ismene and Selinde in brieven (1792)
- Lierzang aan mijne Landgenooten, in Slachtmaand 1813 (Amsterdam, 1813)
- Opwekking aan de Nederlanders, Lierzang (Amsterdam, 1813)

Van Zuylekom also contributed to journals, such as the Almanac for Women by Women and Contributions to Human Happiness, under the initials MvZ or MDW.
