= Anna van Cronenburg =

Anna van Cronenburg (1552 – c. 1590) was a Northern Netherlandish hypothetical painter.

She was a documented relation of Adriaen van Cronenburg, the daughter of a doctor whose second husband became mayor of Leeuwarden in 1579. The issue of the real identity of the artist was raised in an article in 1934 by G. Marlier.

Various works by Cronenburg are in the Fries Museum, and a group of four related portraits of women is in the Prado Museum in Spain. The Prado group are all three-quarter length standing portraits of ladies, two with daughters of perhaps ten years old. One has a skull on a table, like the Cardiff portrait. The four, plus a lost fifth work, were inventoried in the Spanish royal collection at the old royal palace, the Royal Alcazar of Madrid, in 1636, and show their subjects in front of the same background of a Renaissance blind arcade with niches and green drapery, and are virtually the same size (about 1.05 x 0.79 cm).
