= Jacoba van den Brande =

Dutch philanthropist

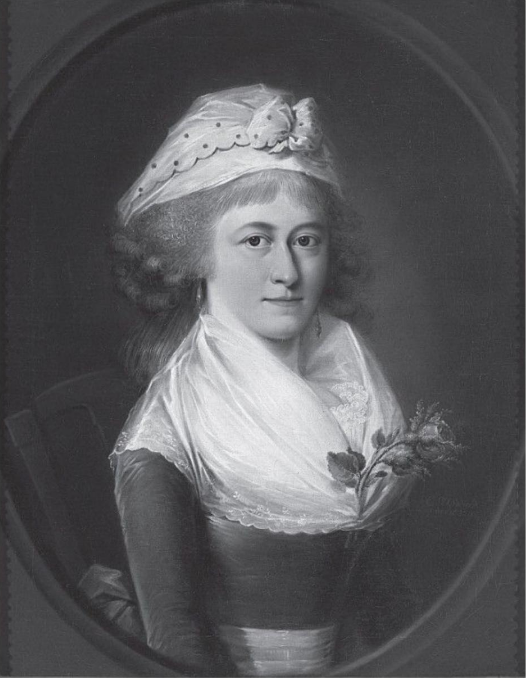
- Oil on canvas portrait
- Born: 4 July 1735; Middelburg, Netherlands
- Died: 14 August 1794 (aged 59); Middelburg, Netherlands
- Spouse: Johan Adriaen van de Perre
- Parent(s): Johan Pieter van den Brande; Mary Heron Berg

Jacoba van den Brande (Dutch pronunciation: [jaːˈkoːbaː vɑn də(m) ˈbrɑndə]; 4 July 1735 – 14 August 1794) was a Dutch philanthropist. She was the founding chairman of the Physics Society of Women in Middelburg.

== Life and career ==
Jacoba van den Brande was born on 4 July 1735 in Middelburg in the Netherlands. She was the daughter of Johan Pieter van den Brande (1707-1758) and Mary Heron Berg (1707-1775), both of whom came from prominent Zeeland families.

In 1760, Van den Brande married Johan Adriaen van de Perre (1738-1790), member of the States-General between 1768 and 1779. Her spouse was a benefactor of numerous academies and societies, and Jacoba herself also became known as such. She was the founder and first chairperson of the Physics/Natural History Society of Women in Middelburg (Dutch: Natuurkundig Genootschap der Dames te Middelburg) (1785); the society was founded in 1785 and was the first all-female science academy in the world.

Van den Brande died on 14 August 1794, at the age of 59, in Middelburg. After her death, her private collection of books, drawings and scientific instruments was auctioned off; the auction took seven days to complete.
