= Jacomina de Witte =

- Born: 1582; The Hague, Netherlands
- Died: 1661 (aged 78–79); Zierikzee (?)
- Occupation: Aristocrat
- Known for: Central figure in the 1649 corruption case in the Netherlands
- Spouse: Johan Oem van Wijngaarden (m. 1617)
- Parent(s): Jacob de Witte (father), Jacomina Weijtsen (mother)

Jacomina de Witte (1582, The Hague – 1661, Zierikzee?) was the central figure in a famous corruption case in the Netherlands in 1649.

Daughter of mayor Jacob de Witte and Jacomina Weijtsen. Since 1617 the spouse of Johan Oem van Wijngaarden, president of the legal court, she was accused of having accepted bribes in exchange for manipulating court cases through the office of her husband, for selling information and bribing officials of the court. She was put on trial in 1649, and was said to have been active in this role for thirty years. The trial attracted a lot of attention, and several women of the aristocracy, notably Amalia van Solms, were rumoured to have been involved. Her husband was freed from having been involved, while she was judged guilty in her absence and sentenced to exile and fined. She lived the rest of her life hidden from the authorities.

The Witte case led to a law change banning gifts to officials or their family members.

== Trial and sentence ==
A printed pamphlet of the trial, published in Middelburg in 1650, provides additional details about the case. It records that Jacomina de Witte was sentenced in absentia to twelve years of banishment from the provinces of Holland, Zeeland and Friesland, as well as a heavy fine. The pamphlet described the accusations against her as accepting bribes, manipulating court cases through her husband’s office, selling information, and bribing officials. The document shows how serious the authorities regarded the affair, which later contributed to legal reforms banning gifts to officials and their families.
