= Bauck Poppema =

Bauck Poppema or Bauck Foppesd. of Popma and Bauck Hemmema, (born in Terschelling, c. 1465 CE, died in Berlikum, Friesland 1501 CE) was a legendary Dutch heroine, known for her defence of the fort Hemmemastate during the conflict between the Schieringers party and the Vetkopers party in 1496.

Poppema was the wife of Doeke Hettes Hemmema (d. 1503), an ally of the Schieringers party. In 1496, a pregnant Poppema successfully defended the fort for a time during a siege by invaders from the city of Groningen. Eventually, however, enemy reinforcements arrived, after which the fort fell and all of Poppema's soldiers were executed. Poppema was imprisoned in Groningen, where legend holds that she gave birth to twins while chained in a dungeon. She was released in 1497 in a prisoner exchange.

Bauck Poppema has become a metaphor for a "brave woman" and an ideal for a Frisian heroine, and was compared to Jeanne Hachette and Kenau Simonsdochter Hasselaer.
