= Margaretha de Heer =

Dutch Golden Age artist (1603–1665)

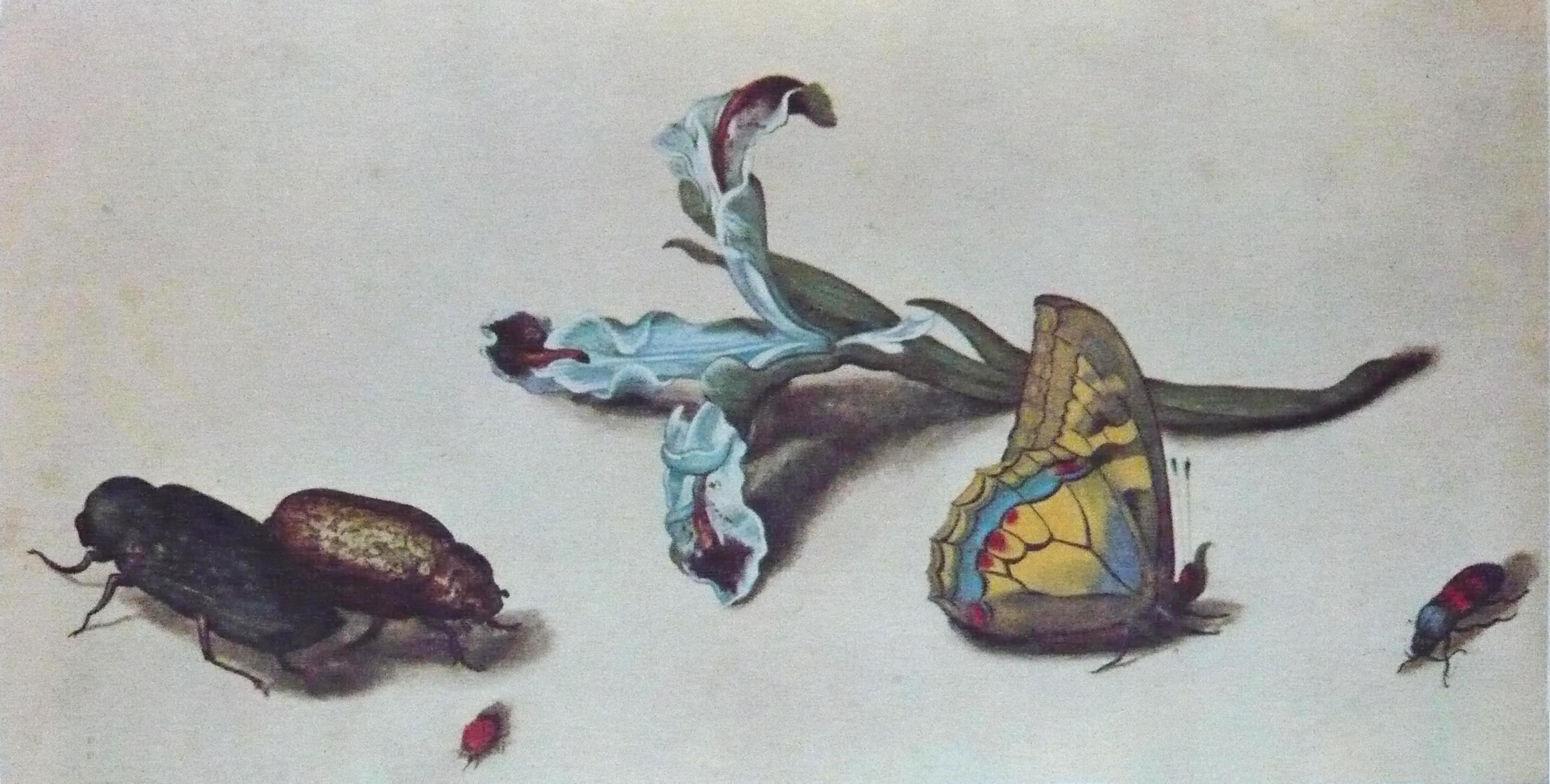
Iris with 4 beetles and a butterfly

Margaretha de Heer (1603–1665) was a Dutch Golden Age painter.

== Biography ==
Margaretha de Heer was born in Leeuwarden in the Dutch Republic in 1603. She was the daughter of the glass painter Arjen Willems de Heer, and the older sister of the artist Gerrit Adriaensz de Heer.

She was taught by her father, who kept a large workshop on the corner of the Herestraat and Oude Oosterstraat in Leeuwarden, and on 21 September 1628 she married the painter Andries Pieters Nyhof or Nieuwhof. She became the aunt of the artist Willem or Guilliam de Heer. She is known for genre works and studies of insects.

In 1636 the Frenchman Charles Ogier, secretary to Cardinal Richelieu visited various studios of artists in the Northern Netherlands, including De Heer and Wybrand de Geest in Leeuwarden, and he wrote in his diary that she was a good painter of birds and insects.

Though she moved a few times to Groningen after her marriage, she kept returning to Leeuwarden and probably died there in 1665. A street in Leeuwarden is named after her.
