= Christina Reinira van Reede =

Dutch courtier and organist

Christina Reinira van Reede (14 August 1776, Utrecht - 18 December 1847, The Hague) was a Dutch courtier and noble orangist heroine. She became famous for saving the orangist general Van der Capellen from French imprisonment in 1813.
