= Ats Bonninga =

Frisian noble

Ats Bonninga (fl. 1494) was Frisian noble, known for her defence of a fortress in Warns in Gaasterland during the conflict between the Schieringers and the Vetkopers party in 1494.

Her story appears mostly in old Frisian histories. She was described as the daughter of Louw van Bonninga, and his wife Hylck van Harinxma. Ats' family supported the Schieringers, as did her husband, Jelmer Sytsma.

When her spouse was captured by the Vetkopers in 1494, she defended the fortress until she could have her spouse released and receive a promise of free evacuation.

Bonninga was the subject of many publications from 1522 and forward and played an important role in the national romanticism of Friesland in the 19th century.
