= Aagt Jafies =

16th-century Dutch arsonist

Aagt Jafies or Aagt Jansdr (d. in Haarlem 2 August 1572) was a Dutch arsonist, known as an informant of suspected heresy.

Aagt Jafies was a religious woman in service as an informant of the heresy hunter Jacob Foppens, who became mayor of Haarlem in 1569. She spied on people and turned over those who did not subject to blackmail to Foppens for heresy. Among her most known victims was Anneke Ogiers (1570). When Haarlem rebelled against Spain in 1572, Jafies and Foppens left the city: shortly afterward, however, Jafies was discovered to have organised fires in the city. She was sentenced for arson and executed by burning. Her death was frequently used by the propaganda during the war.
