= Catharina Rose =

Spanish war heroine

- Conflicts: Eighty Years' War

Catharina Rose (d. after June 1587) was the heroine of the Spanish siege of Sluis during the Eighty Years' War.

At the Spanish siege of the city of Sluis in Flanders in June 1587, Rose was made commander and leader of the women which were given the task of defending the area between the blue tower and the smith towers. This hill was later called Venus-hill or the Women's hill after them. They were allowed to depart after the surrender of the town.

Rose is the subject of the novel Gideon Florensz. (1854) by Geertruida Bosboom-Toussaint.
