= Madame Therese =

Dutch brothel keeper

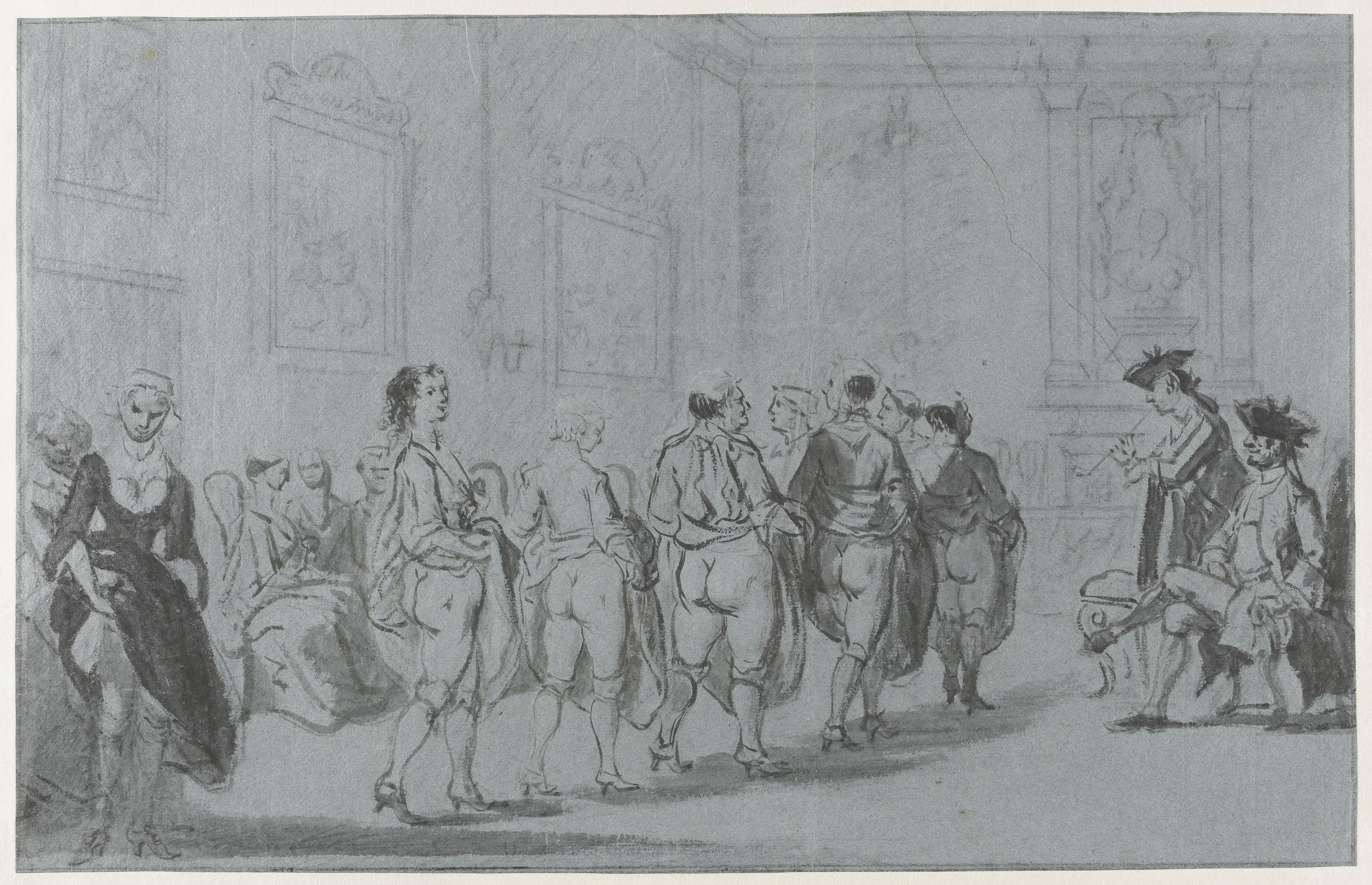
Prince Eugene of Savoy judges a revue of prostitutes at Madame Thérèse's brothel on Prinsengracht, by Cornelis Troost circa 1720 - 1730. Rijksmuseum collection

Madame Therese (floruit 1706-1729), also known as Madame Traese, was the professional name of a famous Dutch brothel keeper. She operated one of the largest and most famous brothels of her time in Amsterdam, with a reputed international list of powerful clients, and was often caricatured in the press. She is confirmed as active from 1706 until 1729.

Few details of Therese's own background are known, but she is believed to have been from the Southern Netherlands and to have been a prostitute herself before becoming a procurer and the manager of a brothel. Her business as a madam is first formally documented on 3 March 1708, when four of her employees were arrested. Therese herself was never arrested but was variously mentioned in court protocols when her employees were. In 1720, it is confirmed that she operated an exclusive brothel at Prinsengracht.

Madame Therese and her brothel were widely reputed in Europe and often used in the press and literature, which made her well known also in later Dutch history. She was caricatured by Jacob Campo Weyerman, and a concept of her profession as a procurer by her nicknames, such as for example "The Grandmother of Destruction". According to satirical pamphlets, Prince Eugene of Savoy and the British Consul Louis Renard was among her international clients.

It is not known how long she was active, as new regulations forced prostitution underground in 1726, but she is known to have still been active in 1729.
