= Judith van Dorth =

Dutch orangist and aristocrat

Johanna Magdalena Catharina "Judith" van Dorth (7 May 1747, in Warnsveld – 22 November 1799, in Winterswijk), known as Freule Van Dorth (Lady of Dorth), was a Dutch orangist and aristocrat. She was executed for treason. She is the only woman in the history of the Netherlands to have been executed by a military tribunal. She is regarded to have been the victim of terrible injustice, and was used by the orangist political propaganda as a victim of the republicans.
