= Gertrude van der Oosten =

Dutch mystic (died 1358)

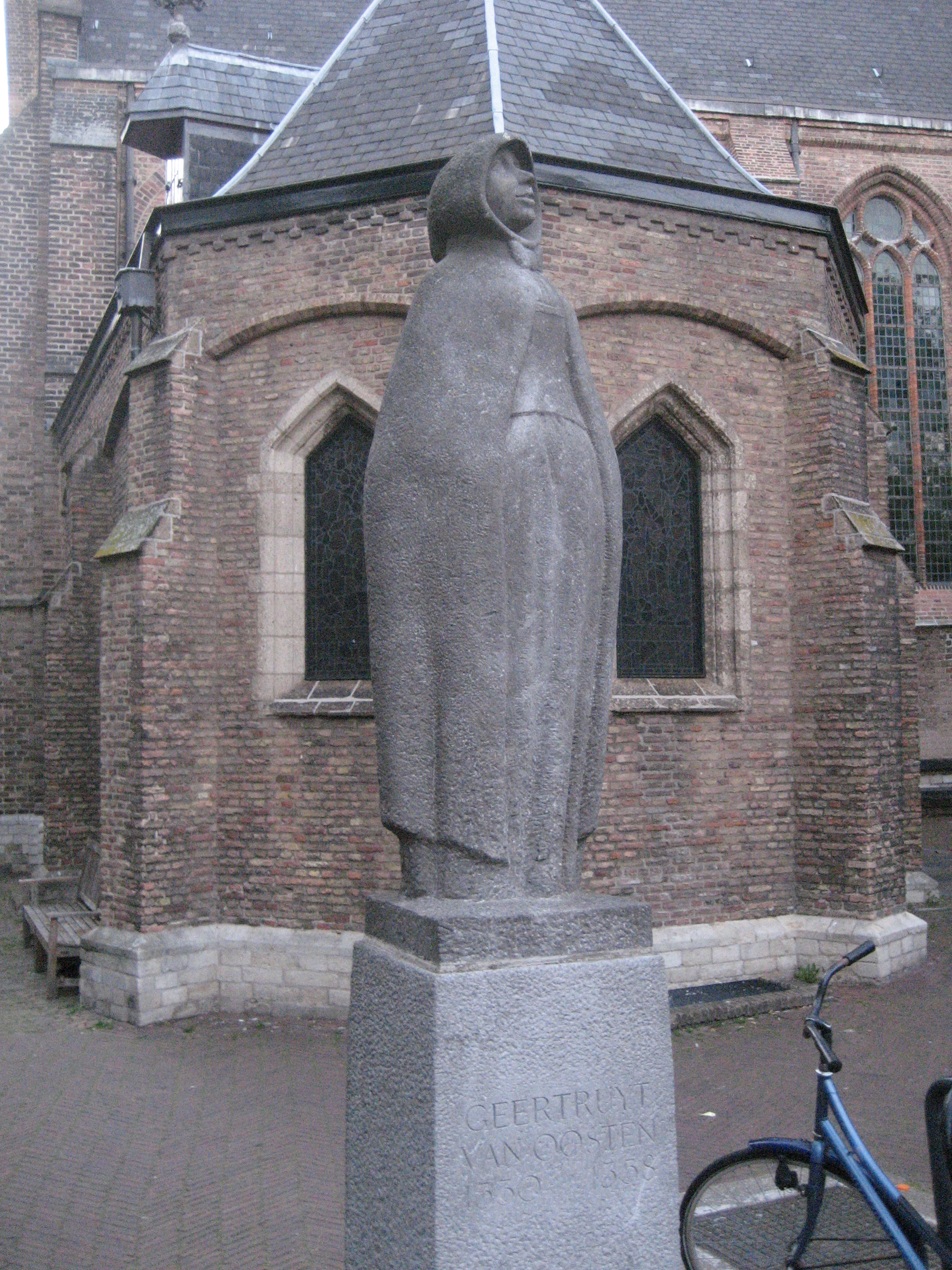
Statue of Gertrude van der Oosten in Delft

Gertrude van der Oosten (or Gertrude of Delft; died 6 January 1358) was a Dutch Beguine who was considered a mystic and had received the Stigmata.

== Life ==
Gertrude was born in Voorburcht in the County of Holland, to peasant parents, and entered domestic service at Delft. Her surname of van Ooten, or "of the East", came from her custom of singing a hymn which began: Het daghet in den Oosten, i.e., "Daylight breaks in the East", which some believe that she composed herself.

After living a religious life for many years and being left by her fiancé, Gertrude obtained admission into the beguinage in Delft. She was not a nun, and she was not bound by religious vows, she profited from the ample opportunities for contemplation afforded by life in the community. She had great devotion to the mysteries of the Incarnation, especially to the Passion of Christ. She is believed to have received the Stigmata in the Good Friday of 1340: "while she lay prostrate before a crucifix, red blood began to gush from her hands, feet, and side and continued to do so seven times that day for every canonical hour, and for days after." She begged God that this grace might be withdrawn, and the blood ceased to flow, but the marks of the Stigmata remained. At the same time she appeared to display the gift of prophecy.

According to the hagiography, her breast became filled with milk when she meditated on the Nativity of Jesus.

Gertrude died in Delft on the feast day of the Epiphany and was buried in the Church of St. Hippolytus in Delft, as that beguinage did not have its own church or cemetery. Her name has never been inscribed in the Roman Martyrology, though she is commemorated in various others, and her cultus is a purely local one.
