= Johanna Corleva =

Dutch translator and linguist

- Born: 1698; Amsterdam, Dutch Republic
- Died: 1752 (aged 53–54)
- Occupation(s): Translator and lexicographer

Johanna Corleva (1698–1752) was a Dutch translator and grammarian active in the 1740s. She is presumed to be the first female lexicographer from the Netherlands because of her Dutch–French dictionary De Schat der Nederduitsche Wortel-woorden.

== Early life ==
Born in 1698 to Anna Catrijna Tessemaker, an orphan from Cologne, and Lourens Corleva, an embroiderer from Delft, she was baptised in Amsterdam's Zuiderkerk on 8 October 1698. Her brother Joannes was born in 1700.

== Grammatical and philosophical works ==
During the 1730s she translated grammatical and philosophical works and composed books of her own in these fields. During this time she became practiced in several languages, including French, Latin, and Greek. It seems her goal was to improve contemporary language usage by making it easier to learn "our fair and glorious mother tongue".

In 1740 she published a Dutch translation of the philosophical work Grammaire générale et raisonnée by Antoine Arnauld and Claude Lancelot under the title Algemeene en geredeneerde spraakkonst. The book was "printed for the Translator", meaning that Corleva personally paid for its publication.

In 1741, she published a French–Dutch dictionary, De Schat der Nederduitsche Wortel-woorden ('The treasure of Low German root words'), which was intended for Dutch persons seeking to learn French and vice versa. It was distinct from other dictionaries of its type at the time, as it only mentioned the meaning of Dutch words themselves without any lengthy lists of phases and exceptions. Corleva was inspired by the Lexicon graeco-latinum by Joannes Scapula. The dictionary is dedicated to man of letters Balthazar Huydecoper, with whom she had corresponded.

Despite this possibly making her the first Dutch female lexicographer, her work did not gain much attention from contemporaries and later scholars. Other works were listed for publication but either were never published or have not survived to today.

== Later life ==
Corleva died in 1752 and was buried in Nieuwe Kerk, Amsterdam on 16th November that year. She was buried as "bejaarde dochter," meaning that she never married.
