= Swob Sjaarda =

Swob Sjaarda (1435-1520) was a West Frisian noble, daughter of Douwe Tjaerts Aylva and Sjaarda Edwert and from 1455 married to Jarich Epes Hottinga.

In 1475, she became a widow with the responsibility of a castle. This was a period of conflicts between different noble clans in the Netherlands, and her castle was sieged by Skerne Wybe in 1481. According to legend, she took Wybe hostage by breaking her word, after which she exchanged him for her brother Tjaard Grioestera.

Her act in 1481 made her a metaphor for betrayal in the Netherlands: the expression Swob, became a way of saying that someone was not to be trusted.
