= Aefgen Listincx =

Dutch Anabaptist, executed for heresy 1538

Aefgen Listincx, or Aeff Pietersdochter (died 20 August 1538), was a Dutch Anabaptist and prophet.

Born in Bruges, she was married to the wealthy merchant Gerrit Listincx. In 1525, 1527, 1530 and 1533, she was put on trial for violating the religious laws. In 1535, banned books were found in her possession and her son stated, during an interrogation for heresy, that his mother was in the Anabaptist-ruled Münster. In Münster, Aefgen Listincx was active as a prophet. She was captured after the fall of Münster but released because of her wealth. In 1538, she was put on trial for heresy and executed by burning.

She was likely the sister of Aleijd Leystingh.
