= Trijntje Johannes Reidinga =

Dutch speed skater (1799–1869)

- Born: 7 April 1799; Goëngahuizen, Smallingerland, Friesland, the Netherlands
- Died: 18 December 1869 (aged 70); Idaarderadeel, Friesland, the Netherlands
- Occupation: Speed skater
- Children: 8

Trijntje Johannes Reidinga (7 April 1799 – 18 December 1869) was a Dutch speed skater.

== Biography ==
Reidinga was born on 7 April 1799 in Goëngahuizen, Smallingerland, Friesland, the Netherlands, and was the youngest child in a Mennonite family. She married farmhand Piebe Pieters de Jong in 1825 and they had eight children together, two of whom died young.

Reidinga won a mixed speed skating pairs competition with Atse Geerts Atsma van Terzool in Leeuwarden, Friesland, in January 1823. The win was reported in the Leeuwarder Courant, Gorredijk poet Kees Harkes Landmeter wrote a long poem commemorating their victory in the race and Reidinga was also remembered in a stanza of a rhyme about speed skaters, which continued to be sung twenty years after the race.

Reidinga was unusual in her continued participation in skating competitions after becoming a wife and mother.

Reidinga died on 18 December 1869 in Idaarderadeel [nl], Friesland, the Netherlands, aged 70.
