= Henriette Amelie de Nerha =

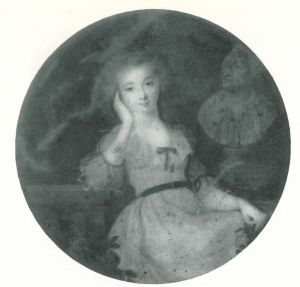
Henriette Amelie de Nerha

Henriette Amelie de Nerha (Brussels, Austrian Netherlands, 1754 - Amsterdam, 19 June 1818), was a Dutch memoir writer, known for her relationship with Honoré Gabriel Riqueti, comte de Mirabeau. She was also a letter writer and corresponded with among others the famous Gilbert du Motier, Marquis de Lafayette. Her correspondence is preserved in the royal library and national archives of the Netherlands.
