= Hanna van Recklinghausen =

Dutch private banker

Hanna van Recklinghausen (1332 – after 1349), was a banker in Lochem in the Netherlands. She is the earliest woman merchant known by name in the Netherlands.

She was the daughter of the Court Jew banker Godschalk (also Gottschalk) from Recklinghausen in Germany. Her father was a money-lender to the nobility, and she is listed as his assistant and colleague from 1347. Her sister Hannah Rose and another female family member is also listed as colleagues, but they are mentioned a little later than her. In the Jewish community, women were allowed to participate in business as long as they fulfilled the religious duties, and fathers were encouraged to teach their daughters to read and count.

Hanna van Recklinghausen is last heard of in 1349. During the Black Death, massacres were committed against the Jewish population in many cities, where they were blamed for the plague and accused of having poisoned the water wells. Lochem lay in the area belonging to the Duke of Gelderland, Reginald III, Duke of Guelders, who in 1350 took a group of Jews in custody. It is unknown if Hanna van Recklinghausen was a part of that group, and it is also unknown what happened to that group, if it was placed under the duke's protection or killed. There is no further information of her after 1349.
