= Catharina Heybeek =

Dutch journalist and feminist

Catharina Heybeek (6 March 1764 – 26 May 1810) was a politically active Dutch journalist, feminist and editor. She was born in Rotterdam.

Heybeek was arrested and sentenced to three years for Sedition in 1798. She belonged to the radical democrats who were active in the radical paper Nationaale Bataafsche Courant after the Batavian Revolution of 1795. From prison, she smuggled out letters urging the women to rebel against the regime. She died in Zaltbommel, aged 56.
