= Christina Houbraken =

Dutch artist

- Born: c. 1695
- Died: 1760s
- Other name: Kristijna Houbraken
- Spouse: Anthony Elliger (m. 1724)
- Children: 3, including Christina Maria Elliger
- Father: Arnold Houbraken

Signature
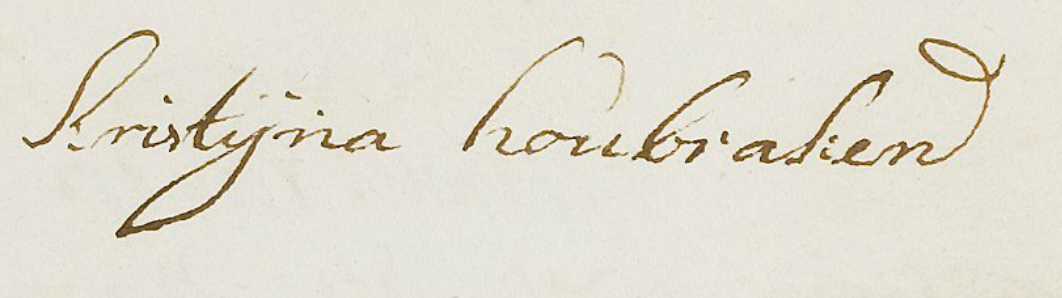

Christina Houbraken (c. 1695–1760s) was an 18th-century artist from the Dutch Republic.

== Biography ==
She was born in Dordrecht as the fourth of ten children of Arnold Houbraken. In 1724 she married the painter Anthony Elliger in Amsterdam, where the couple both lived. They had three daughters, of whom Christina Maria Elliger became a notable pastel artist. Her death date is not certain, but by 1773 her husband was living in Haarlem and there is no mention of her there or after that when he moved to Ede. Though, like her siblings Jacob and Antonina, she was an artist, none of her works are known to have survived.
