= De Waede castle =

Demolished castle in the Gelderland, Netherlands

De Waede
- De Waede / De Poll
- Angeren, Gelderland, Netherlands
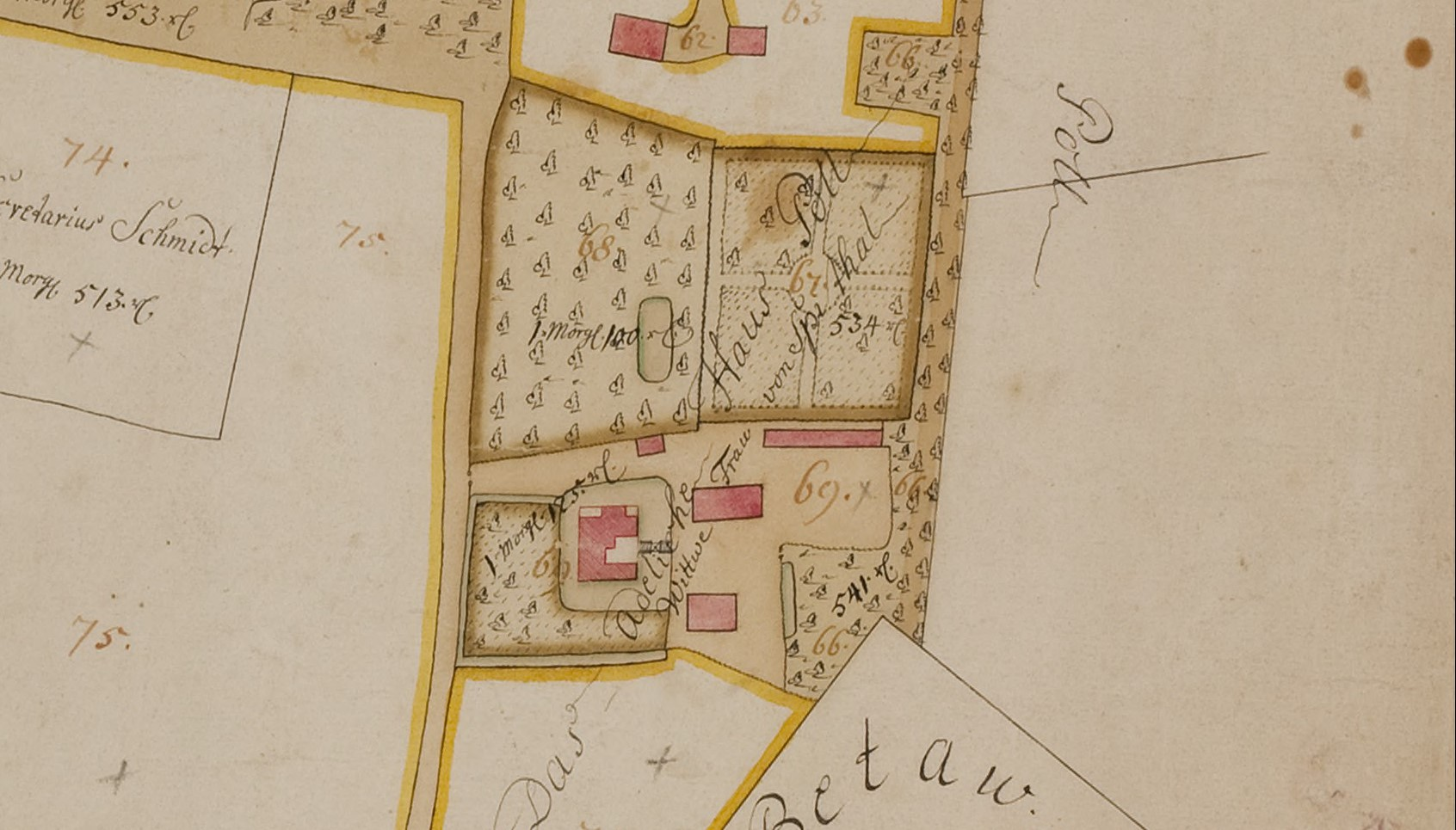
- Map of the Huissen and Malburgen area from 1733, showing Castle De Poll (De Waede).

Site information
- Type: Motte castle
- Owner: (last) Alexander Josephus Ludovicus Baron van Laer van Hoenlo
- Open to the public: No
- Condition: Demolished; subsurface archaeological remains

Location
- Location within Gelderland Location within Netherlands
- Coordinates: 51.9223°N 6.0066°E

Site history
- Built: c. 1240
- Built by: Counts of Kleve

De Waede castle (also known as Waey or later De Poll) was a medieval castle in Huissen, Gelderland, the Netherlands. It was built by the Counts of Cleves circa 1240 to control passage on the river Rhine, where they imposed a toll. This strengthened Cleves’ influence in the region of Huissen and Angeren. The name De Waede likely referred to the many nearby pools or scour holes left by Rhine River activity.

== History ==
The first recorded mention of a feudal proprietor at House De Waede is Jan van den Wade in 1260. A marriage contract drawn up that year between the houses of Guelders and Cleves lists, among the Cleves nobles, “...Jan van den Wade of a ministerial lineage from a mansion in Angeren...”.

A document dated 8 June 1347 records the transfer of the “estate in der Waden” to knight Theodoricus de Bylandt. The Van Bylandt family retained possession until 1487, when Adolf of Wylich inherited it by marriage to Elizabeth van Bylandt.

The Wittenhorst tot Endt family restored the castle in the late 16th century and renamed it De Poll, a Latinization of De Waede. The castle later passed through several owners. Its final proprietor was Alexander Josephus Ludovicus Baron van Laer van Hoenlo, who died in 1875. After his death, the castle was demolished and the land divided into lots. A farmhouse built on the site burned down in 1990, and today a modern residence occupies the location.

== Description ==
Archaeological reports describe the castle site as located on slightly elevated ground selected for defense. With the high local water table, its motte may have been heightened by excavation of a natural moat. Strategically, House De Waede lay along the Roman frontier line, the Limes Germanicus.

A historic document from 1656 describes the castle as a motte castle with two floors, a basement, a gatehouse with a drawbridge, and outbuildings.

A 1720 sketch by Jacobus Stellingwerf depicts a rectangular house with a round corner tower, though some scholars question whether it represents De Waede castle. An 1830 cadastral map shows the castle as U-shaped, possibly with a staircase in the courtyard.
