= Martin Zaagmolen =

Dutch painter (died 1669)

Martin Zaagmolen or Martinus Saeghmolen (buried 1 November 1669) was a Dutch painter.

== biography ==
Zaagmolen was born in Oldenburg. Houbraken notices him as a painter of history, and describes a picture of the Last Judgment by him, in which were introduced a great number of figures, very poorly drawn and feebly coloured. Saeghmolen operated from 1640 to 1660. He was the master of Jan Luyken, and Michiel van Musscher; so, if he was not a good painter himself, he was a prestigious teacher. For the anatomist Johannes Van Horne, he also created a massive myology atlas.

Zaagmolen died in Amsterdam.
