= Anthony Elliger =

Dutch painter

- Born: 3 July 1701; Amsterdam
- Died: 5 June 1781 (aged 79); Ede

Anthony Elliger (1701–1781) was an 18th-century painter from the Dutch Republic.

Elliger was born in Amsterdam as the son of Ottomar Elliger II. He was the brother of Ottmar Elliger III. He married Christina Houbraken, a daughter of Arnold Houbraken and they became the father of Christina Maria Elliger.

Besides his daughter, his pupils were Jan Gerard Waldorp, Jurriaan Andriessen, Izaäk Schmidt, and Johannes Cornelis Mertens.

At the age of almost 80, Elliger died in Ede on June 5, 1781.
