= Christina Maria Elliger =

Dutch painter

- Born: 23 September 1731; Amsterdam, Netherlands
- Died: 6 March 1802 (aged 70); Amsterdam, Netherlands
- Style: pastel
- Spouse: G Swam

Christina Maria Elliger (23 September 1731 – 6 March 1802) was an 18th-century artist from the Dutch Republic.

== Biography ==
Elliger's signature

Christina Maria Elliger was born in Amsterdam as the daughter of Anthony Elliger and Christina Houbraken, a daughter of Arnold Houbraken. At age 17 she was included by Johan van Gool in his book of painter biographies, who claimed she made good portrait likenesses with pastel crayons. She married G Swam, and is sometimes known as Christina Maria Swam-Elliger. She died in Amsterdam.
