= Thomas Hees =

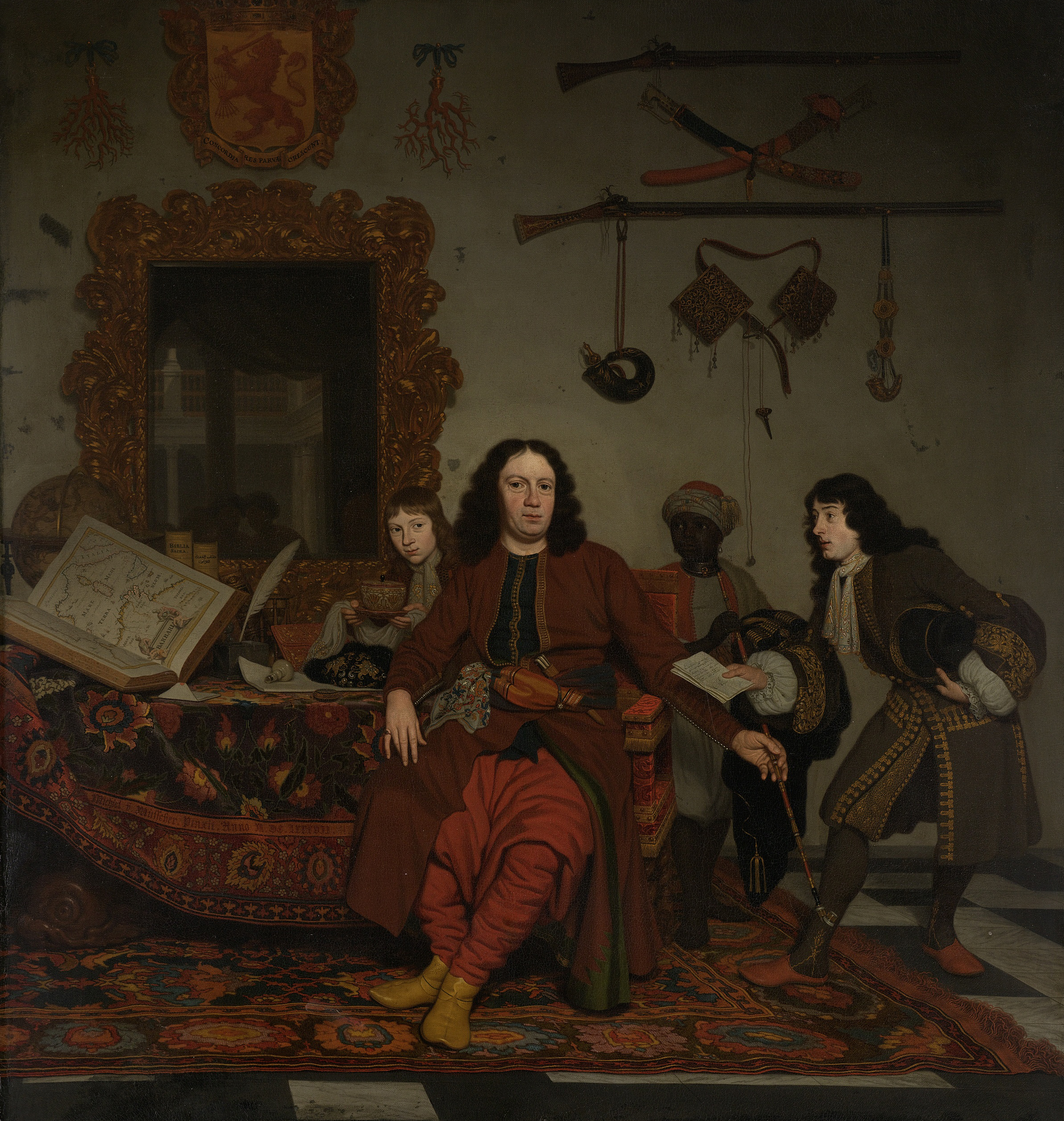
"Thomas Hees with his nephews Jan and Andries Hees and a servant" by Michiel van Musscher, oil on canvas, 1687, Rijksmuseum. The coat of arms above the mirror depicts the lion of the County of Holland.

Thomas Hees (1634 - 1693) was a Dutch diplomat, active in the negotiations of the States General with the corsairs of Barbary. He is mostly known through his famous portrait (painted by Michiel van Musscher) but also thanks to the journal which he kept during his first mission in Algiers.

== Early life ==
Hees was born to a wealthy family of Weesp in 1634. At the age of 20, he was enrolled in the faculty of Philosophy of the University of Leiden, only to switch to medicine four years later. He completed his medical studies in Angers and then returned to the Republic in 1660 where he was named doctor(geneesheer) at the "Collegium Medicum" of Amsterdam. In 1664-5 he accompanied Jacob Boreel during his embassy to the court of czar Alexis I in Moscow.

== Missions in Barbary ==
Even though the Dutch had acquired their own Capitulations by the Ottoman Porte in Constantinople as early as 1612, the corsairs of Algiers, Tunis and Tripoli (still nominally under the suzerainty of the Sultan) continued to prey on Dutch shipping passing through the Straits, and took hundreds of sailors as slaves in the process. The Dutch government retaliated with a number of punitive expeditions, the most famous of which were the three missions of Michiel de Ruyter.

In 1674, Algiers decided that it could not keep fighting against all of the European maritime powers and called on the States General to send an envoy to negotiate the terms of a potential peace. The man chosen for this mission was Thomas Hees, dispatched to Algiers in 1675 with the title of “commissaris”. Before Hees could acquire a guarantee of a stable peace, It took four years of constant lengthy negotiations, which he described in his diary, preserved at the National Archives in The Hague. In 1682 Hees was back in Algiers, this time to free the remaining slaves. From there he travelled to Tunis and Tripoli to conclude peace with these cities as well. Hees went on a third mission in 1685, this time to reinforce the existing treaties. After the end of his diplomatic career he settled back in Amsterdam. Hees died in 1693 and was buried in the Nieuwe Kerk on September 3 of that year.

== Sources ==
- Hardenberg, Herman, Tussen Zeerovers en Christenslaven. Noordafrikaanse Reisjournalen, (Leiden 1950).
- van Krieken, Gerard, Kapers en Kooplieden: De Betrekkingen tussen Algiers en Nederland 1604-1830, (Amsterdam 1999).
- Weber, Roijen, De Beveiliging van de Zee tegen Europeesche en Barbarijse Zeerovers 1609-1621, (Amsterdam 1936).
