= Ottmar Elliger =

Flemish Baroque painter

- Born: 1633; Gothenburg, Sweden
- Died: 1679 (aged 45–46)
- Occupation: painter

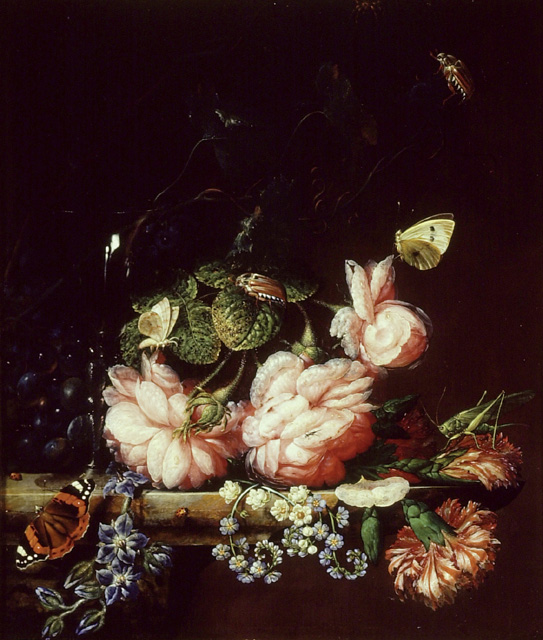
Flowers on a stone slab, ca. 1686

Ottmar Elliger (1633–1679) was a Flemish Baroque flower painter.

According to the Netherlands Institute for Art History, he was born in Gothenburg, but he was trained in Antwerp by Daniel Seghers. His earliest dated work is from 1653. He is registered in Copenhagen in 1654, Amsterdam in 1660 (where he married), Dordrecht in 1662, and Hamburg in 1665. In 1670 he became court painter to Friedrich Wilhelm in Berlin, where he stayed. His Dutch pupil Hermanus Noordkerk started a career as a decorative painter in Amsterdam, but gave up painting to study law in Leiden.

According to Houbraken, he travelled all the way from Göteborg to Antwerp just to train with Daniel Seghers, who was at the high point of his fame at that period. His father had wanted him to become a master of languages, which must at least have been partially successful, since he travelled so much.

his early works in Antwerp show a resemblance to the work of Jacob Marrel, with whom he appeared to be in correspondence while Marrel was in Frankfurt.

his son Ottmar Elliger the Younger or Ottmar Elliger II (1666–1735) was also an artist.
