= Ottmar Elliger the Younger =

Dutch painter (1666–1735)

Ottomar Elliger (II)
- Born: 1666; Hamburg
- Died: 1735 (aged 68–69); Amsterdam

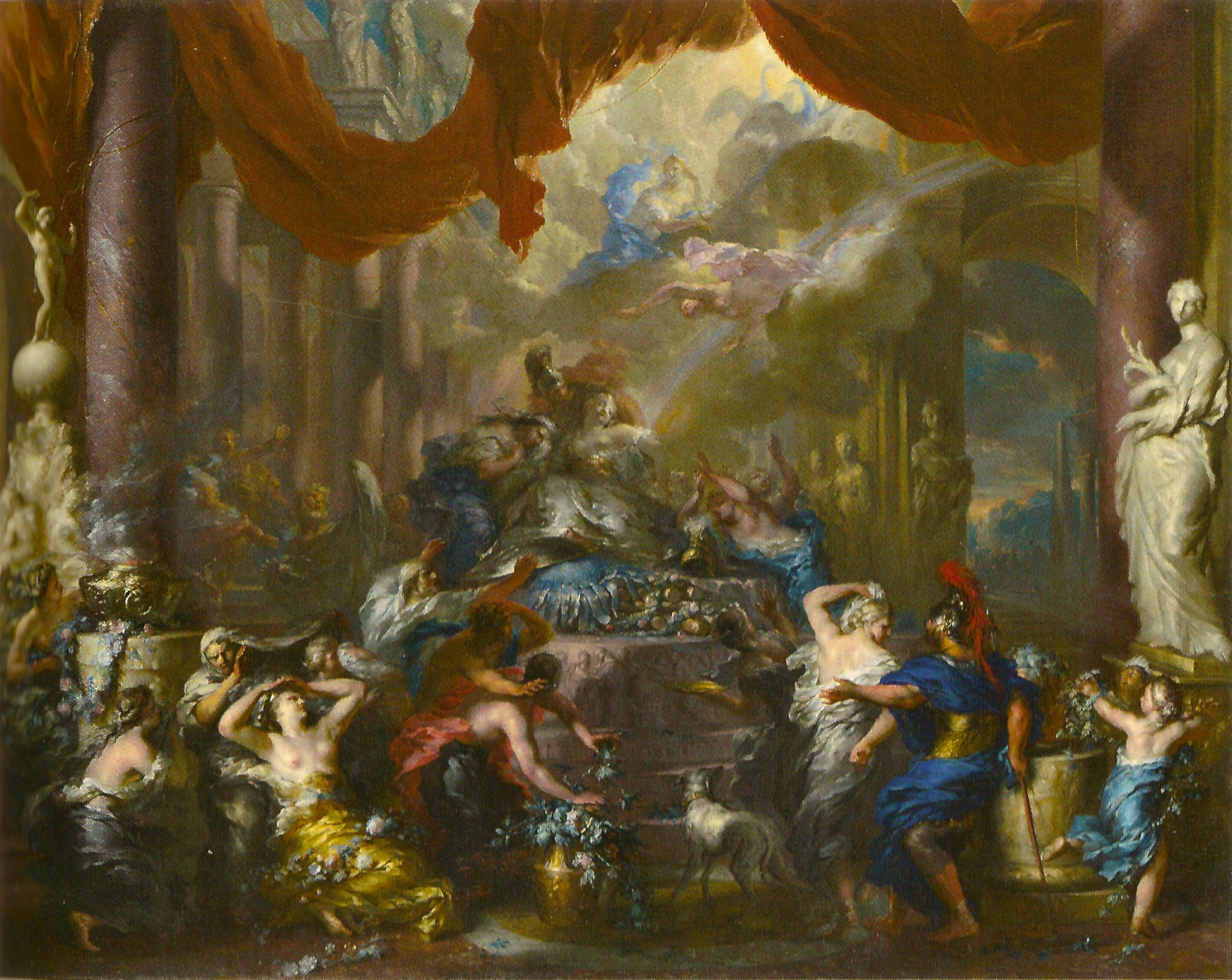
The Death of the Dido

Ottomar or Ottmar Elliger the Younger (1666–1735) was a Dutch painter from Germany.

== Biography ==
He was born in Hamburg as the son of the Danish painter Ottomar Elliger the Elder. After being instructed in the first elements of the art by his father, he was sent to Amsterdam, where he became a scholar of Michiel van Musscher, a painter of small portraits and conversations, under whom he studied a short time, but being ambitious of distinguishing himself in a higher walk of art, and the works of Gerard de Lairesse being then in high reputation, he entered the school of that eminent master, whose instruction enabled him in a few years to dispense with further assistance. Elliger painted historical subjects in the style of De Lairesse, which were judiciously composed and correctly drawn. Like his instructor, he was particularly attentive to propriety of costume, and style of architecture. He was employed by the Elector of Mayence, for whom he painted the Death of Alexander, and the Marriage of Peleus and Thetis. His principal works are at Amsterdam, where he died in 1735. In the Vienna Gallery is a Woman with Fruit; in the Cassel Gallery are The Feast of Cleopatra, and The Daughter of Herodias dancing; and in the Bordeaux Museum is an Allegory, all of which are by him.

His sons Anthony Elliger and Ottomar Elliger (III) also became painters.
