= Antonina Houbraken =

Dutch artist (1686–1736)

- Born: 30 May 1686; Dordrecht, Dutch Republic
- Died: December 1736 (aged 50); Amsterdam, Dutch Republic
- Spouse: Jacobus Stellingwerff (m. 1723; died 1727)

Antonina Houbraken (30 May 1686 – December 1736) was a Dutch draughtswoman who is known for her many topographical drawings of Dutch sites. She also drew landscapes. She is recorded as a skilled portraitist.

== Life ==
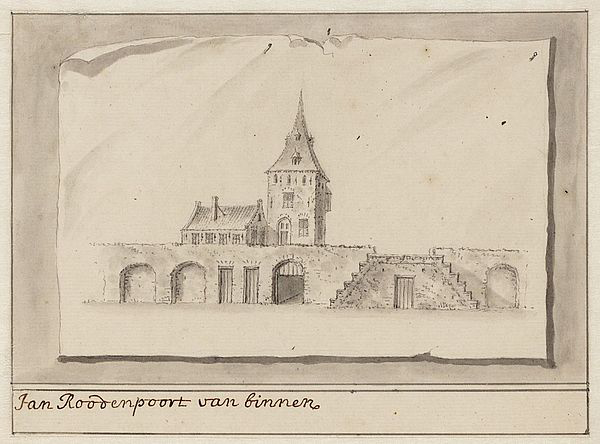
Jan Rodenpoortstoren, Amsterdam

Antonina Houbraken was born on 30 May 1686 and baptized on 31 May 1686 in Dordrecht in the Dutch Republic. She was the daughter of painter and writer Arnold Houbraken and sister of the printmaker Jacob Houbraken. It is assumed she learned to draw in her father's workshop.

She married Jacobus Stellingwerff in May 1723. Her husband was a draughtsman who provided topographical drawings to Brouërius van Nidek, a lawyer who was undertaking a project to map the entire Dutch Republic. For this purpose he collected topographical drawings. Stellingwerff also made topographical drawings for the albums of Andries and Gerrit Schoemaker, collectors of topographical prints and drawings. Antonina made a large portion of the drawings for Schoemaker. Stellingwerff died in December 1727 and Antonina continued at least until 1729 to supply drawings to Schoemaker.

Houbraken died in Amsterdam, aged 50, and was buried on 12 December 1736.

== Work ==
Houbraken assisted both her father and her brother Jacob with making designs for the prints that were included in her father's book on Netherlandish painters, The Great Theatre of Dutch Painters. She also provided designs for other print projects of her brother as well as of others such as Pieter Tanjé.

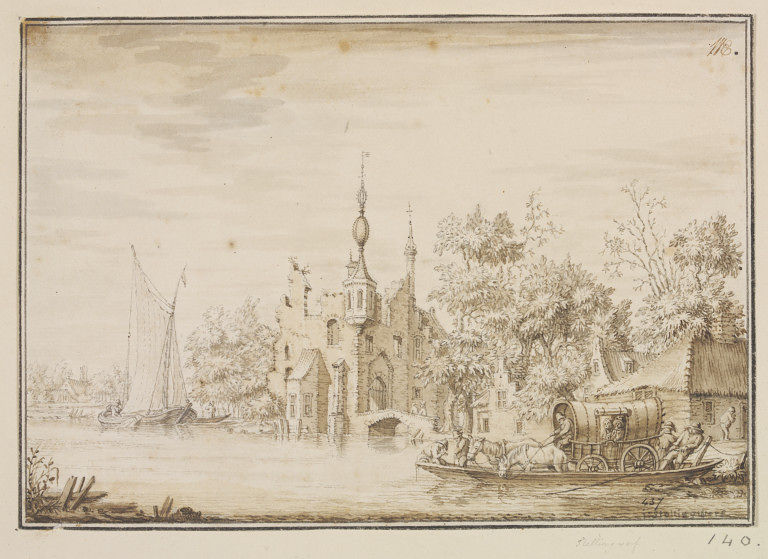
Fantasy landscape

Antonina was responsible for many of the topographical drawings for the albums of Andries and Gerrit Schoemaker, collectors of topographical prints and drawings. Her husband followed her style of drawing. It has only recently been discovered that many drawings previously attributed to her husband that are part of the collection Schoemaker are actually her work. The works signed with J.S. are now attributed to Antonina and those signed with J:St. to her husband. Whereas it is believed her husband did not make any outdoor drawings but mainly copied from others' works, Antonina is known to have made on-site drawings. Her drawings are regarded as more precise and detailed than those of her husband, and typically include human figures.

Three portrait drawings attributed to her are kept in the Amsterdam City Archives. It includes a Portrait of Mr. Joan Corver (1628–1716), Alderman and Mayor of Amsterdam dated to 1715.

Various museums such as the Victoria and Albert Museum and the Museum Boijmans Van Beuningen hold drawings attributed to her in their collections.
