= Joanna Koerten =

Dutch artist (1650–1715)

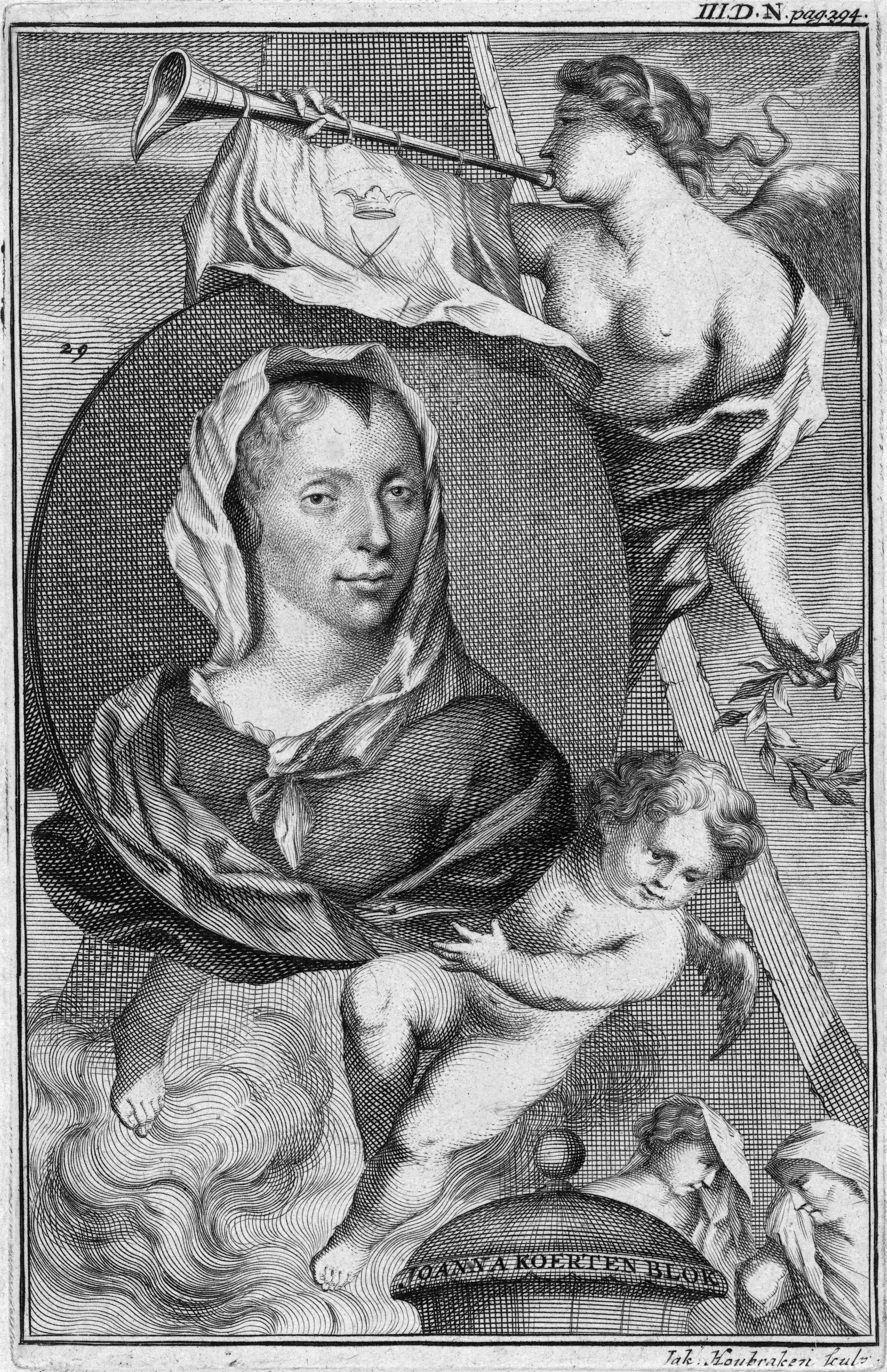
Portrait of Joanna Koerten by Jacobus Houbraken, after a painting by David van der Plaas

Joanna Koerten, (married name Joanna Block) (17 November 1650 in Amsterdam – 28 December 1715 in Amsterdam) was a Dutch artist who excelled in painting, drawing, embroidery, glass etching, and wax modeling. She achieved fame as a silhouette cutter, the art of creating outline images from pieces of cut paper mounted on a contrasting background. She produced landscapes, seascapes, flowers, portraits, and religious scenes in this medium. Her clients included Peter the Great of Russia, Frederick Elector of Brandenburg, Johan de Witt and William III of England.

== Biography ==
She was the daughter of Jan Koerten (1622–1651), a Mennonite cloth merchant, and his wife Ytje Cardinaels, who was from a well-known and wealthy family in Amsterdam. (d. before October 25, 1691). Her father died when she was one year old. Her mother remarried Rosijn Zacharias in 1659, also a cloth merchant. Joanna only married in 1691 after her mother and stepfather had died, when she was 41 years old. Her husband was Adrian Block, who, just like her father and stepfather, was a cloth merchant. He was of Mennonite background. They had no children. He was an avid supporter of her artwork, supported her house museum, and promoted her work long after her death.

From a young age she sat apart from other children and showed an interest in depicting what she saw around her, things both animate and inanimate.

She gained fame as an artist working out of her husband's shop at No. 137 Nieuwendijk Amsterdam, which served as a gallery of her work. It was a house museum dedicated to her work as well, named The Blok. Peter the Great honored her with a visit in 1697 in the company of Mayor Witsen. The Blok was frequented by many other artists, poets, and other royals such as Cosimo de Medici. According to Houbraken, she could carve scenes on glass with a diamond, embroider and weave silk creations, pouring wax creations, lace-making and watercolor painting. Koerten was nicknamed ‘Scissors Minerva’, in reference to Minerva, the Roman goddess of craft, wisdom, weaving and embroidery.

According to the RKD, she was known as a knipkunstenaar or papercut artist and draftsman. Joanna Koerten died on 28 December 1715 aged 65, and is buried in the Oudezijds Chapel, Amsterdam.

After her death her gallery continued as a place of interest to artists and a visitors book kept by her surviving husband shows the names of many notable artist and poet visitors, both during her lifetime and beyond. Among them are artists Gerard de Lairesse, Melchior Hondecoeter and Nicholas Verkolje; calligraphers Jacob Gadelle, and Mary Strick; and poets David van Hoogstraten, John Brandt, Gesine Brit and Katharina Lescailje. Her husband published the Stamboek in homage to Koerten, which featured a collection of poems inspired by the artist.

== Technique ==
Koerten's paper cutting technique imitates the high art characteristics of oil painting and sculpture of the 17th century. She focused create the effect of the textural and perspectival nature of painting while at the same time achieving the monumental nature of sculpture. She emphasised the pictorial and illusionistic aspects of paper cutting, making her an innovative artist of her time as compared to typical paper cut art with delicate interlaced and calligraphic strands. She used a wide variety of cut shapes to more accurately imitate the appearance of gradually chiaroscuro, similar to painting.

In her portrait of Peter the Great (c.1697), Koerten portrays varying textures and contrast shown in the rough stonework through small slits as well as in Peter's armor shining in dark wedge cuttings contrasting against the white paper. Peter's fur ermine cape utilizes cutting techniques created with sharp spiked cuts, soft molded carvings, and short, ragged snips. Koerten's Frederik III shows linework depicting a deeper illusion of interior space in her use of linear perspective. Textured stonework and shimmering fabrics are also shown in this work along with curved, sweeping cuts resembling the appearance of hair.

== Works ==
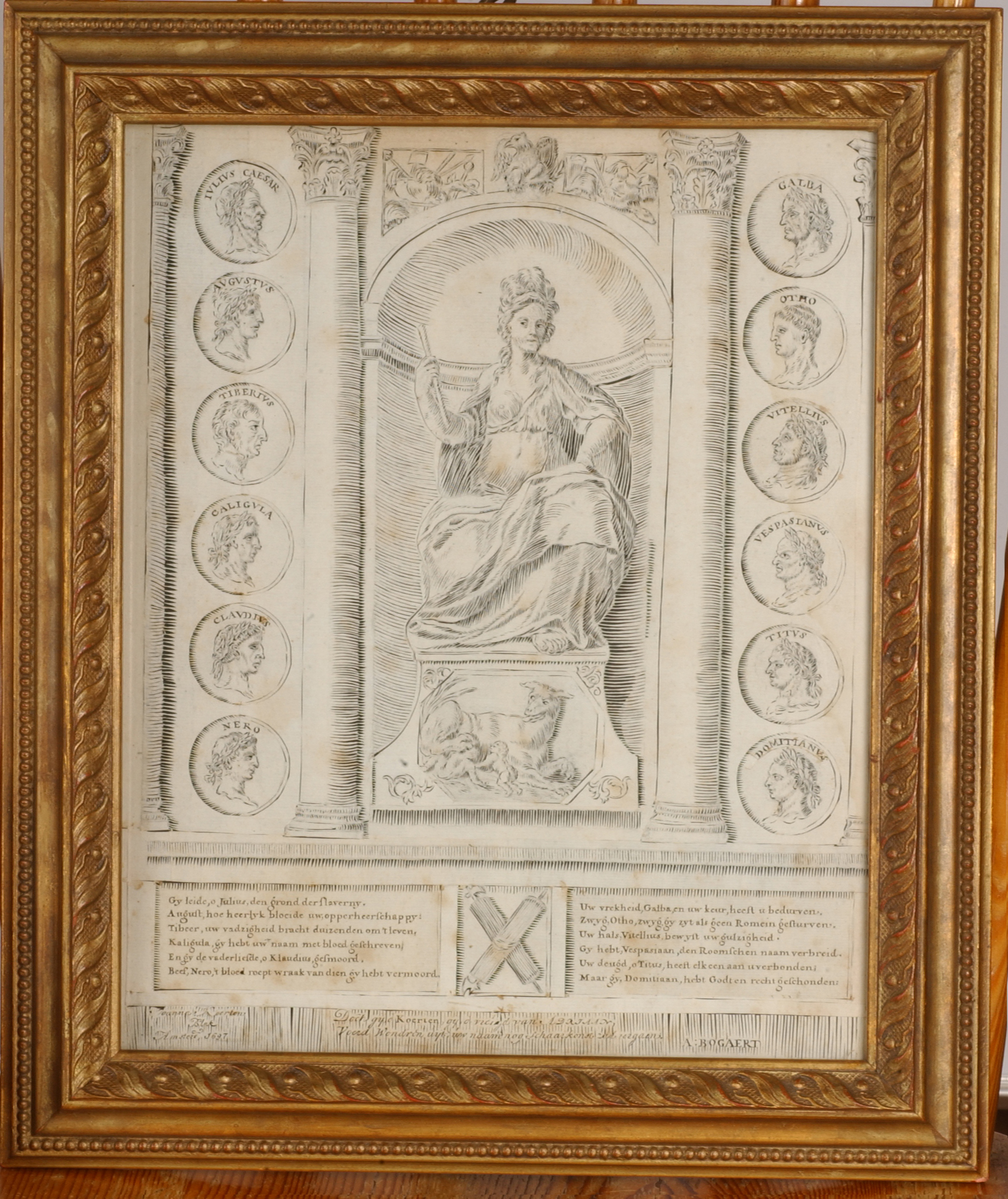

Only fifteen of her works survive. The existence of others can be inferred from descriptions in old auction lists.

For a description of her oeuvre see: Catalogus van een overheerlijk konstkabinet papiere snykonst, door wylen Mejuffrouw Koerten, huisvrouw van wylen Adriaan Blok, met de schaar in papier gesneden (Amsterdam ca.1750).

Examples of her work can be seen in the Stedelijk Museum De Lakenhal (Leiden), in the Koninklijke Bibliotheek (The Hague), in Kasteel-Museum Sypesteyn (Loosdrecht) and in Westfries Museum (Hoorn).

Three of her works were included in the 2025 exhibition Women Artists From Antwerp to Amsterdam, 1600-1750 at the National Museum of Women in the Arts (NMWA).
