= Jacob Levecq =

Dutch Golden Age painter

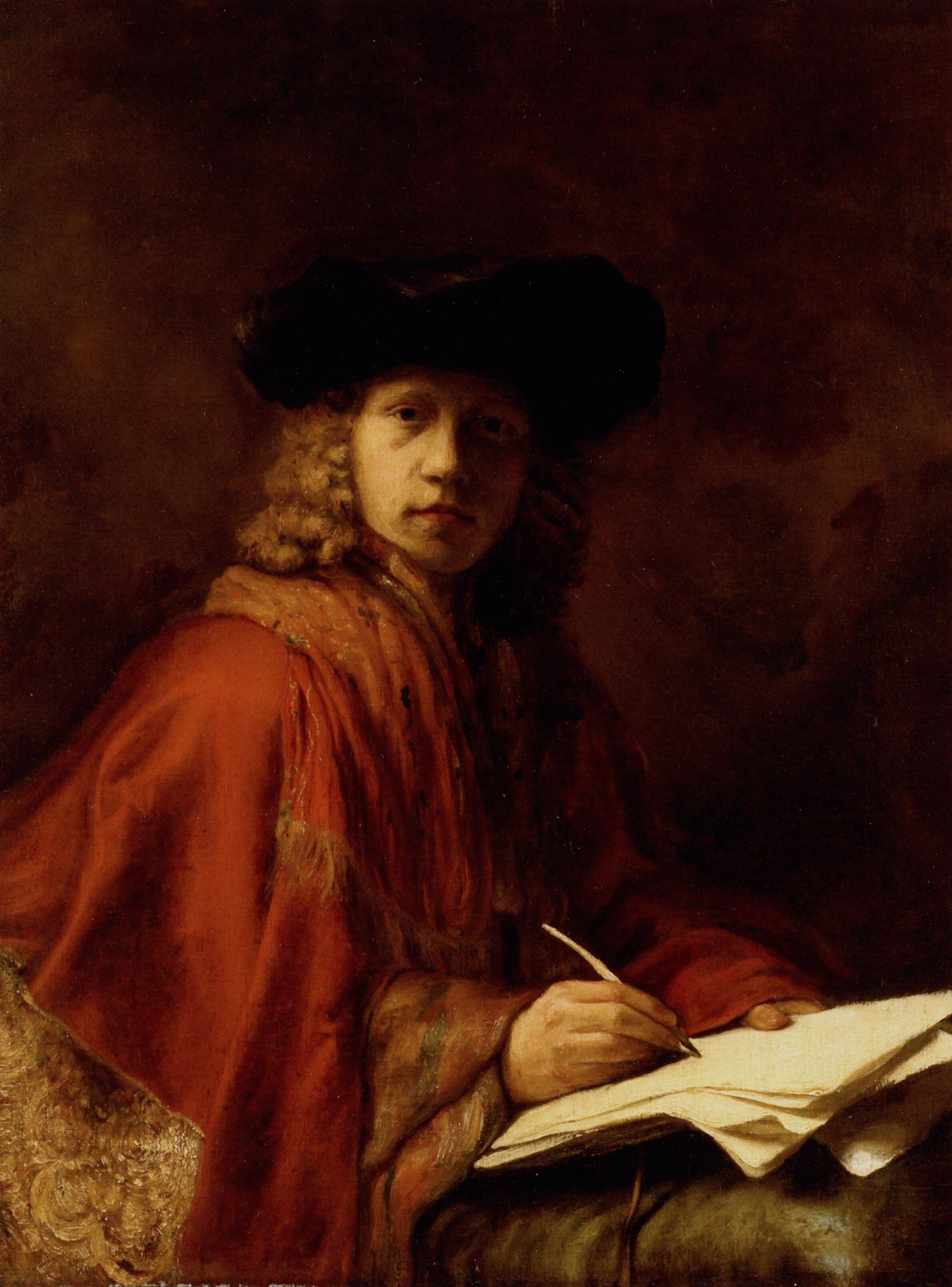
- Born: Jacques L'Evesque; 1634; Dordrecht
- Died: 1675 (aged 40–41); Dordrecht
- Known for: Painting
- Movement: Baroque

Jacob Levecq (c.1634–1675), né Jacques L'Evesque, who signed his name J. Leveck or J. L., and was also referred to as Jakob Lavecq, Jacobus Levecq, Jacobus L'Evesque, and Jacobus Lavecq, was a Dutch Golden Age painter trained by Rembrandt.

== Biography ==
According to Houbraken, who was his pupil during the last nine months of his life, Levecq had been trained by Rembrandt. He inherited a good sum of money when his parents died that he used to take care of himself, his two unmarried sisters and a blind half-brother. Houbraken could not recall much of his painting style, since Levecq had been mostly sick while he was living in Houbraken's house and no longer painted actively.

In his younger years Levecq travelled to Paris and Sedan where he painted portraits and on his return to Dordrecht became a portrait painter in the manner of Jan de Baen. When he died, Houbraken inherited a third of his prints, but regretted the fact that as a young man with little experience in such matters, he only chose prints by Lucas van Leyden and Albrecht Dürer, and had left the French prints for others, and so was very glad that he had received one anyway by Charles le Brun.

According to the RKD, he was Rembrandt's pupil from 1653 to 1655 and travelled south to France in 1660.
