= Jan Gerard Waldorp =

Dutch painter

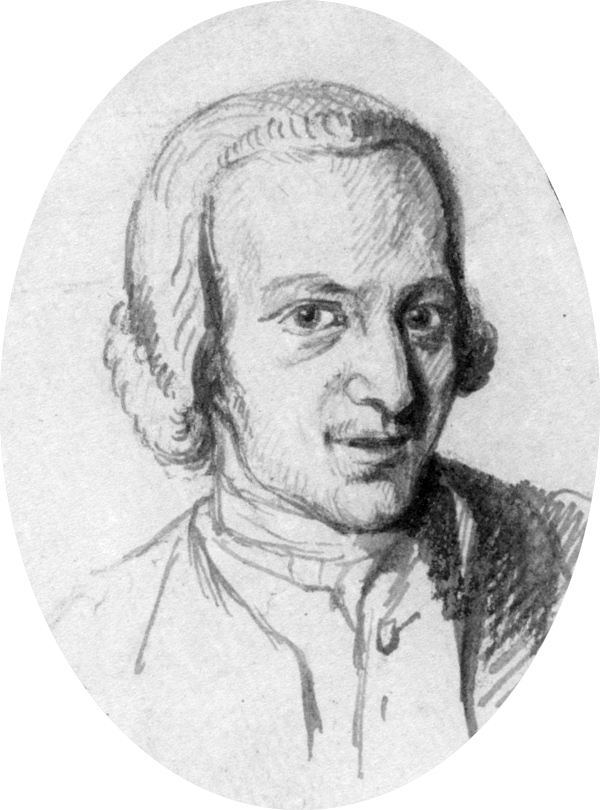
- Born: 12 August 1740; Amsterdam, Netherlands
- Died: 21 November 1808 (aged 68); The Hague, Netherlands
- Occupation: Artist.

Jan Gerard Waldorp (1740–1808) was a Dutch artist and museum curator. He received all paying visitors to the Nationale Kunst-Galerij in the Hague (1800–1805), one of the forerunners of the Rijksmuseum in Amsterdam.

Jan Gerard Waldorp was a pupil of Anthony Elliger and Jan Maurits Quinkhard. He was active in Amsterdam during the years 1758–1767 and then moved to Haarlem, where he married Elisabeth van der Horst and was in the board of the Stadstekenacademie. In 1779 he moved back to Amsterdam.

J.G. Waldorp became known for his decors for the Amsterdamse schouwburg. He is also known for his copies of old master paintings. In 1800 Cornelis Sebille Roos appointed him as assistant for the Nationale Konst-Gallery and he moved to Huis ten Bosch where he received visitors to the gallery until 1802, when the collection was moved to the emptied Gallery Prince William V. His drawings of the situation of the rooms and paintings show what this forerunner of the Rijksmuseum looked like.

== Gallery ==
Maps of the Nationale Kunst-Galerij, drawn by Waldorp:

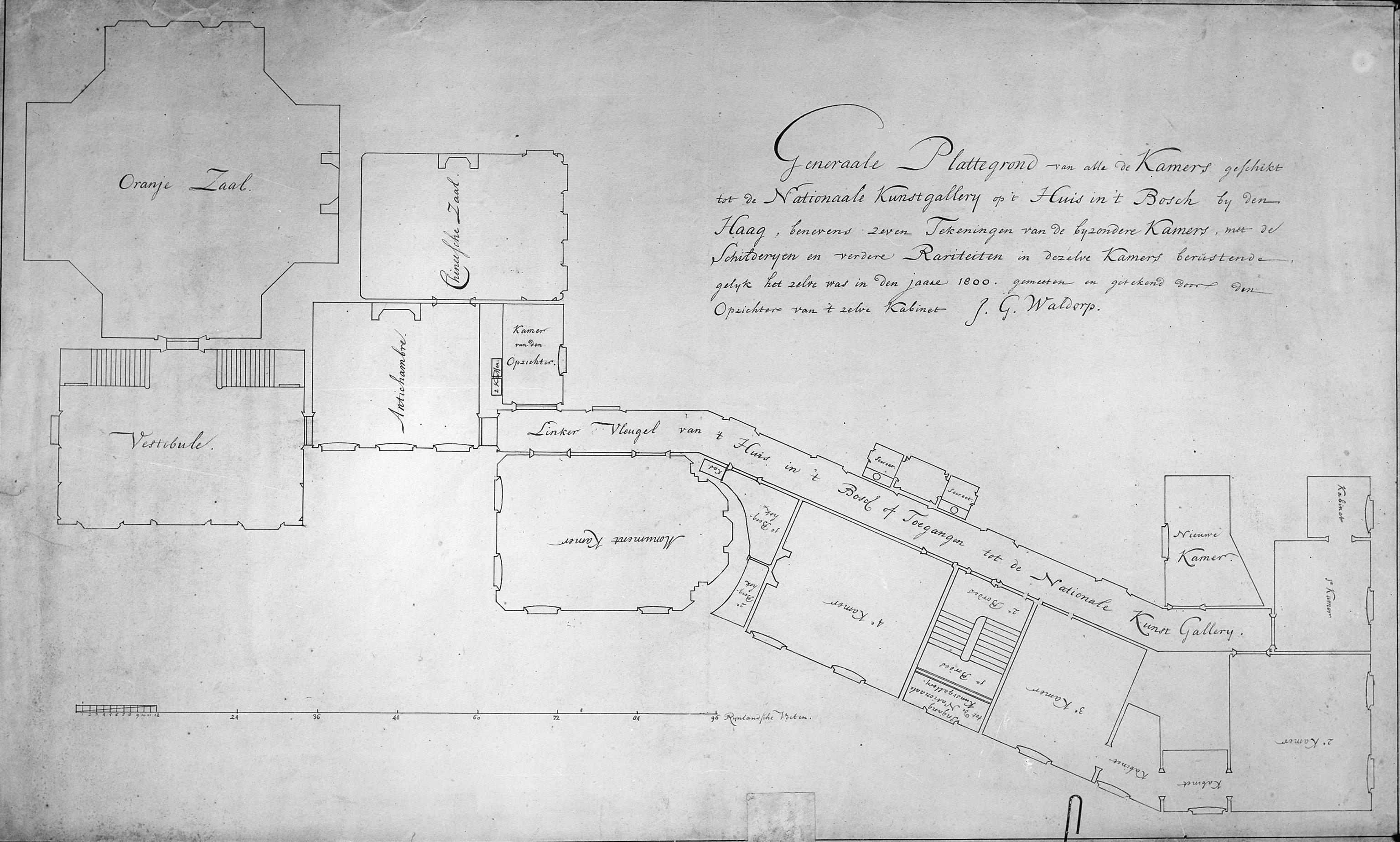

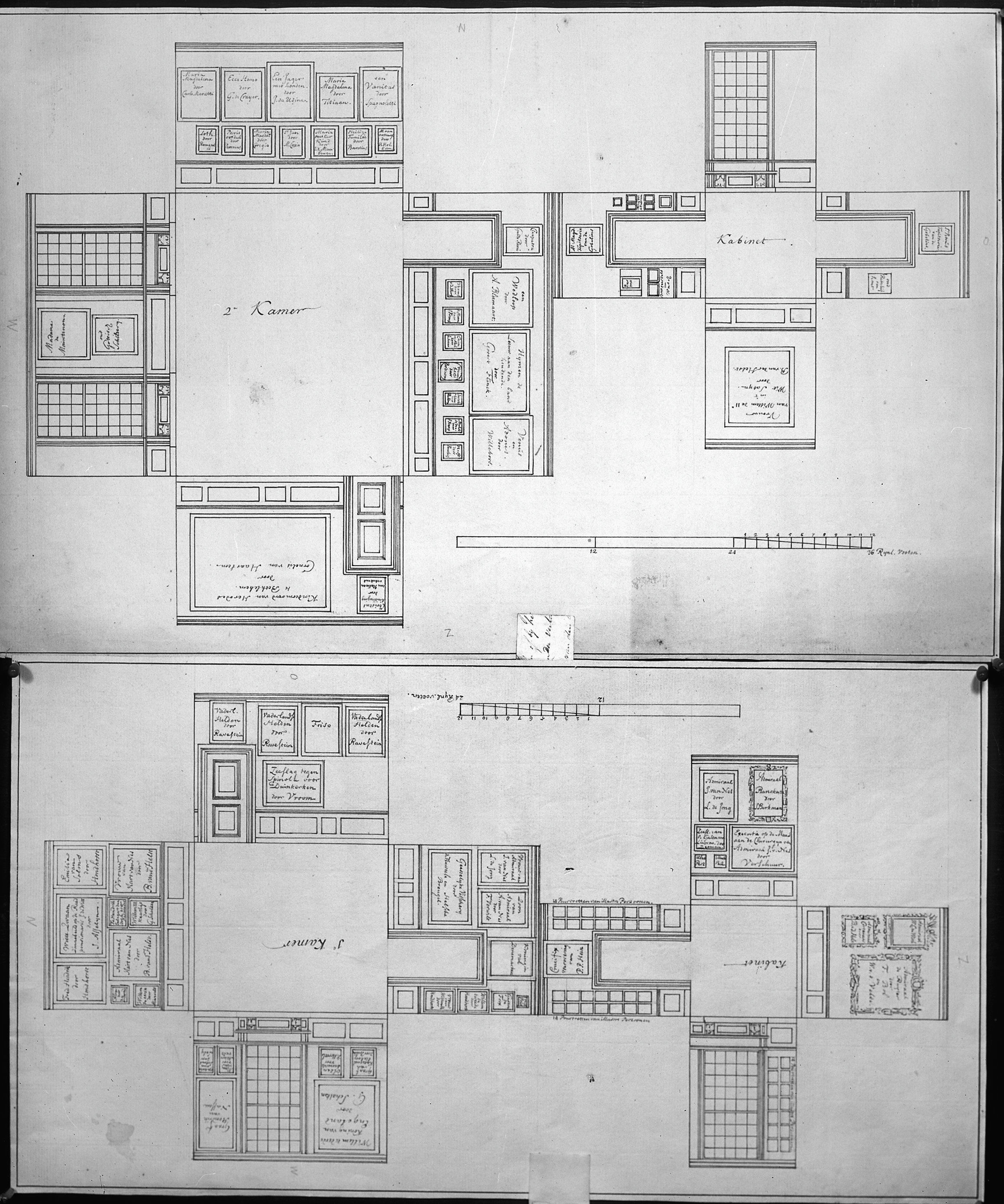
