= Michiel van Musscher =

Dutch painter (1645–1705)

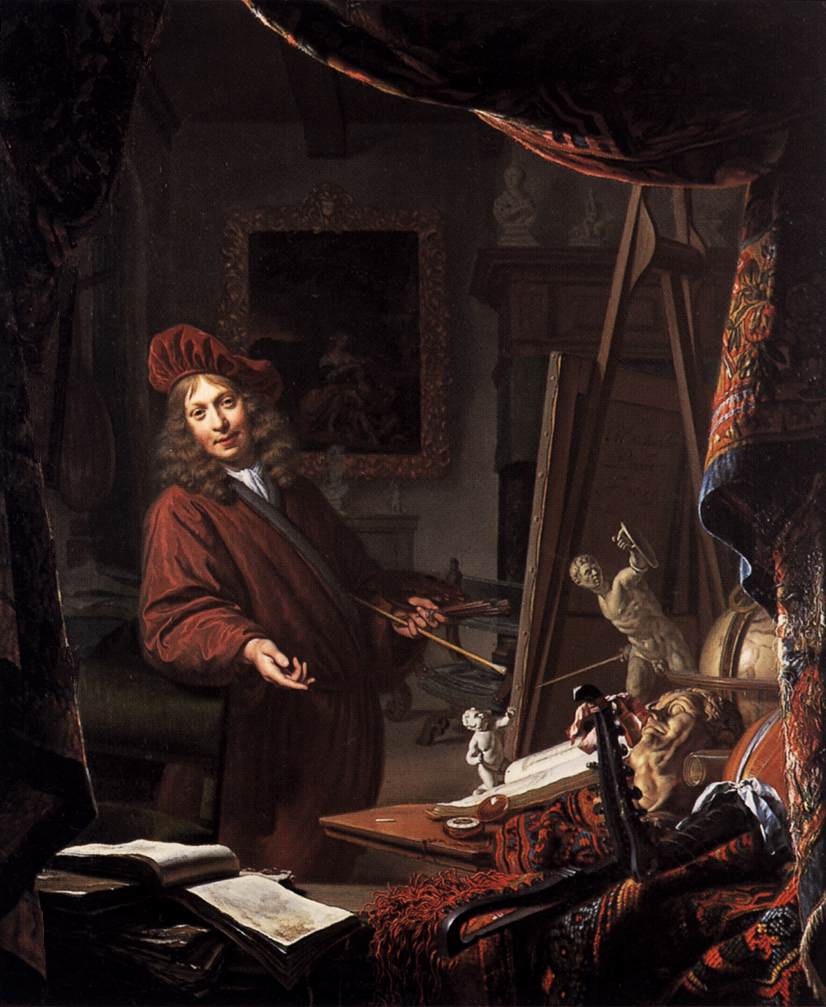
- Self-portrait dated 1679
- Born: Michiel van Musscher; January 1645; Rotterdam
- Died: 20 June 1705 (aged 60); Amsterdam
- Known for: Painting
- Movement: Baroque

Michiel van Musscher (January 1645 – 20 June 1705) was a Dutch Golden Age painter.

== Biography ==
Michiel van Musscher was born in Rotterdam in January 1645 and was later baptized on 27 January.

According to Houbraken, he showed a talent for drawing at a young age, and had many teachers, of which he kept a record. His first teacher was Martinus Saeghmolen in 1660 for two months, and in 1661, he took lessons from Abraham van den Tempel. In 1665 he took seven lessons with Gabriel Metsu, and in 1667 he spent three months in Haarlem to take lessons with Adriaen van Ostade. Though his entire education spanned several years, Houbraken was astonished that he became so skilled with so few hours of professional study, and concludes that he must have had a great natural talent that he practiced extensively on his own.

Houbraken wrote that he moved to Amsterdam to work for Jonas Witsen, a wealthy art lover who introduced him to all of his friends as a portrait painter. He married twice, first to Eva Visscher in 1678 in Buiksloot (Amsterdam), and the second time in 1693 to the widow Elise Klanes. His pupils were Ottmar Elliger the Younger and Dirk Valkenburg.

He died on 20 June 1705 in Amsterdam and was buried on June 25 in the Nieuwe Kerk.

== Works ==
All of his portraits listed here are at the Rijksmuseum, Amsterdam unless noted otherwise.

- Portrait of Michiel Comans, Calligrapher, Engrager, Painter and School Master With His Third Wife Elisabeth van der Mersche
- Self-Portrait
- Portrait of Eva Vissher, Wife of Michiel van Musscher
- Portrait of Isaac Pontanus
- Portrait of a Captain
- Portrait of Thomas Hees, Resident and Commissary of the States General to the Governments of Algiers, Tunis and Tripoli
- Portrait of Johannes Hudde (1628-1704), Mayor of Amsterdam and a Mathematician
- Portrait of Johan Maurits (1604-79), Count of Nassau-Siegen and Governor of Dutch Brazil
- Portrait of Hendrick Bicker (1649-1718), Mayor of Amsterdam
- Portrait of Maria Schaep (1658-1725), Wife of Hendrick Bicker
- Portrait of Adriaen Corver and his Wife (1666)
- Portrait of Gerard Pietersz Hulft (1677)
- A Young Girl at the Table
- The Painter's Studio (1679) (now in Museum Rotterdam)
- Portrait of a Lady With Her Dog (1686)
- Portrait of Alexander Danilovich Menshikov (67x45.5 cm) (1698), painted in Holland during the Grand Embassy of Peter the Great, now at the Y. Weisman collection in Munich
- Portrait of François Lefort (70x60 cm), (1698), painted in Holland during the Grand Embassy of Peter the Great, now at the Museum of Art and History, Geneva

== Gallery ==
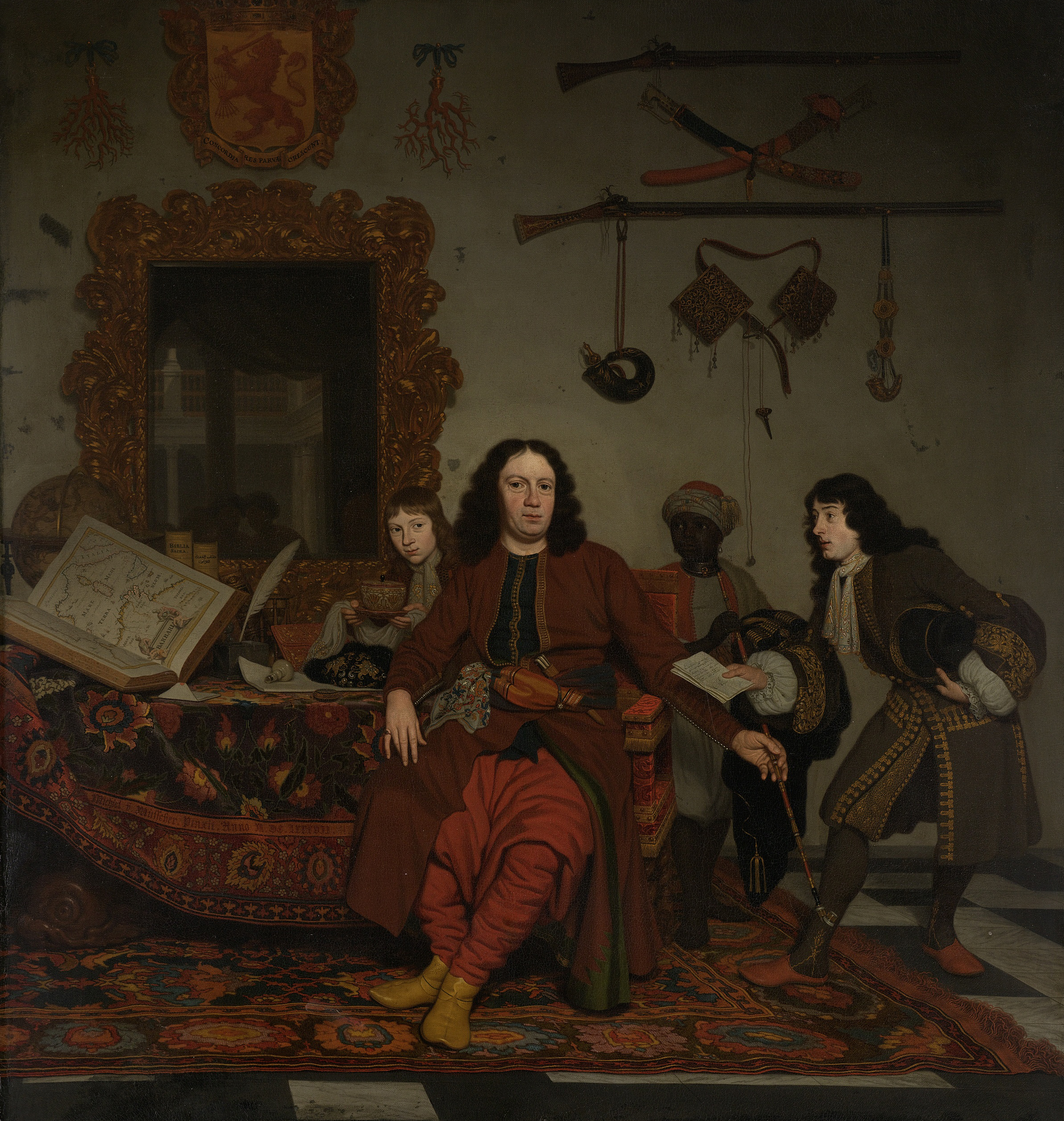
Thomas Hees, resident and commissioner of the States General at the governments in Algiers, Tunis and Tripolis, with his nephews Jan and Andries Hees and a Servant, 1687

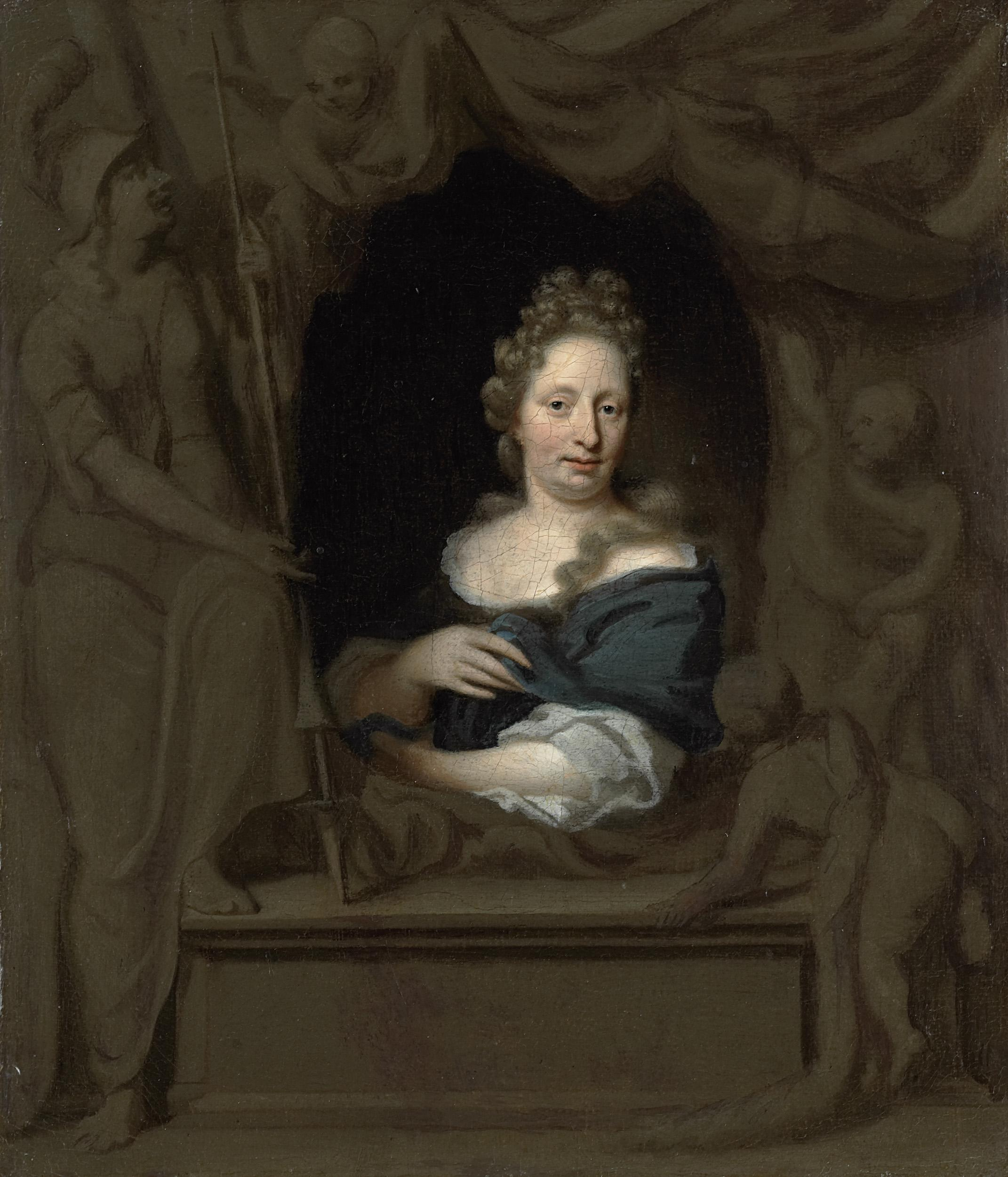
Portrait of Eva Vissher, wife of Michiel van Musscher

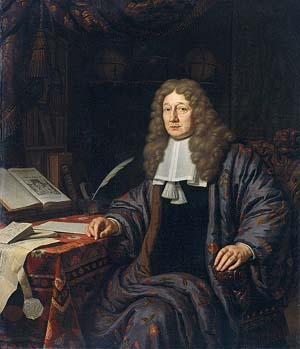
Portrait of Johannes van Waveren Hudde, mayor of Amsterdam and mathematician

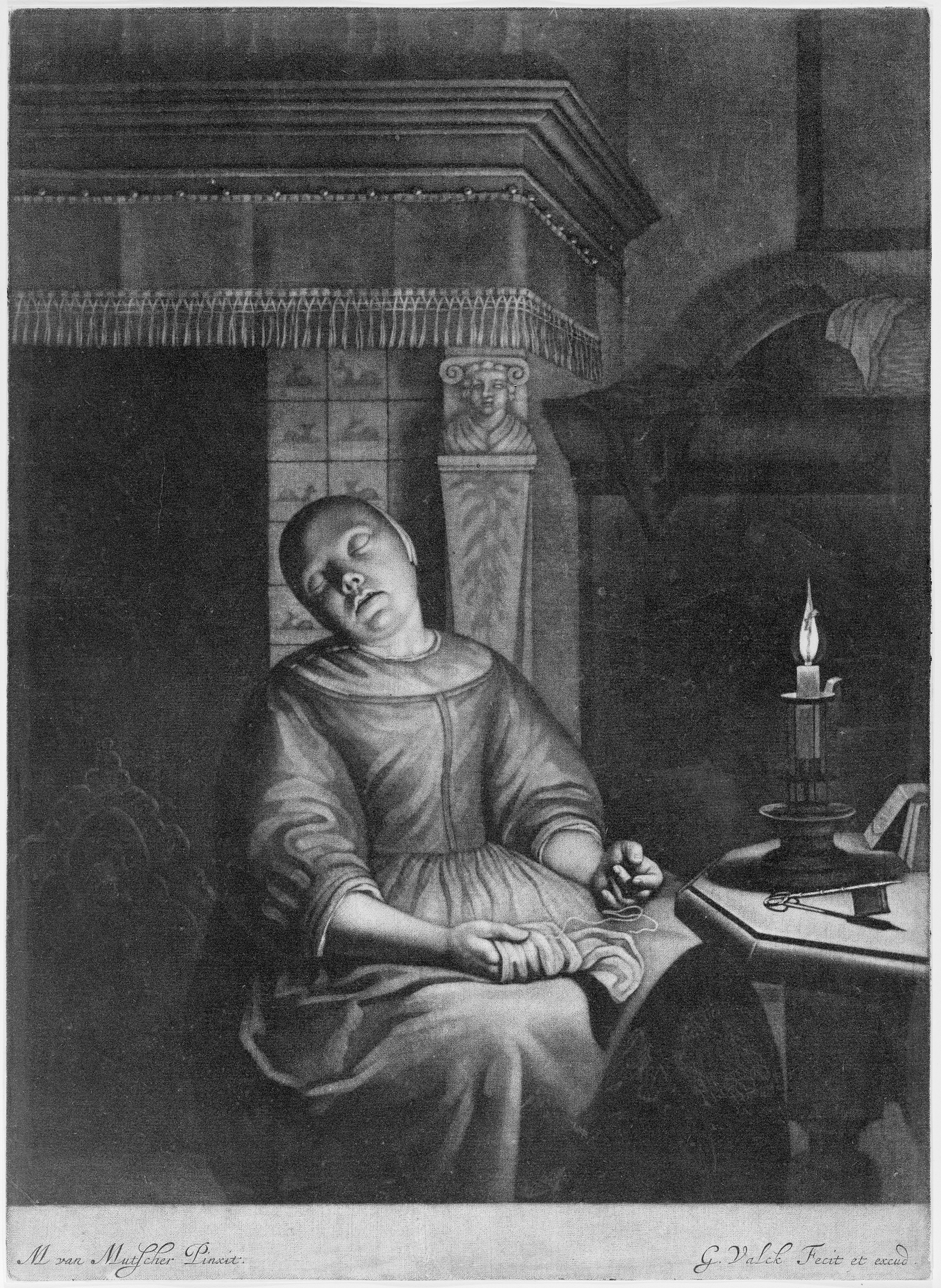
Sleeping Girl with Needlework in her Lap

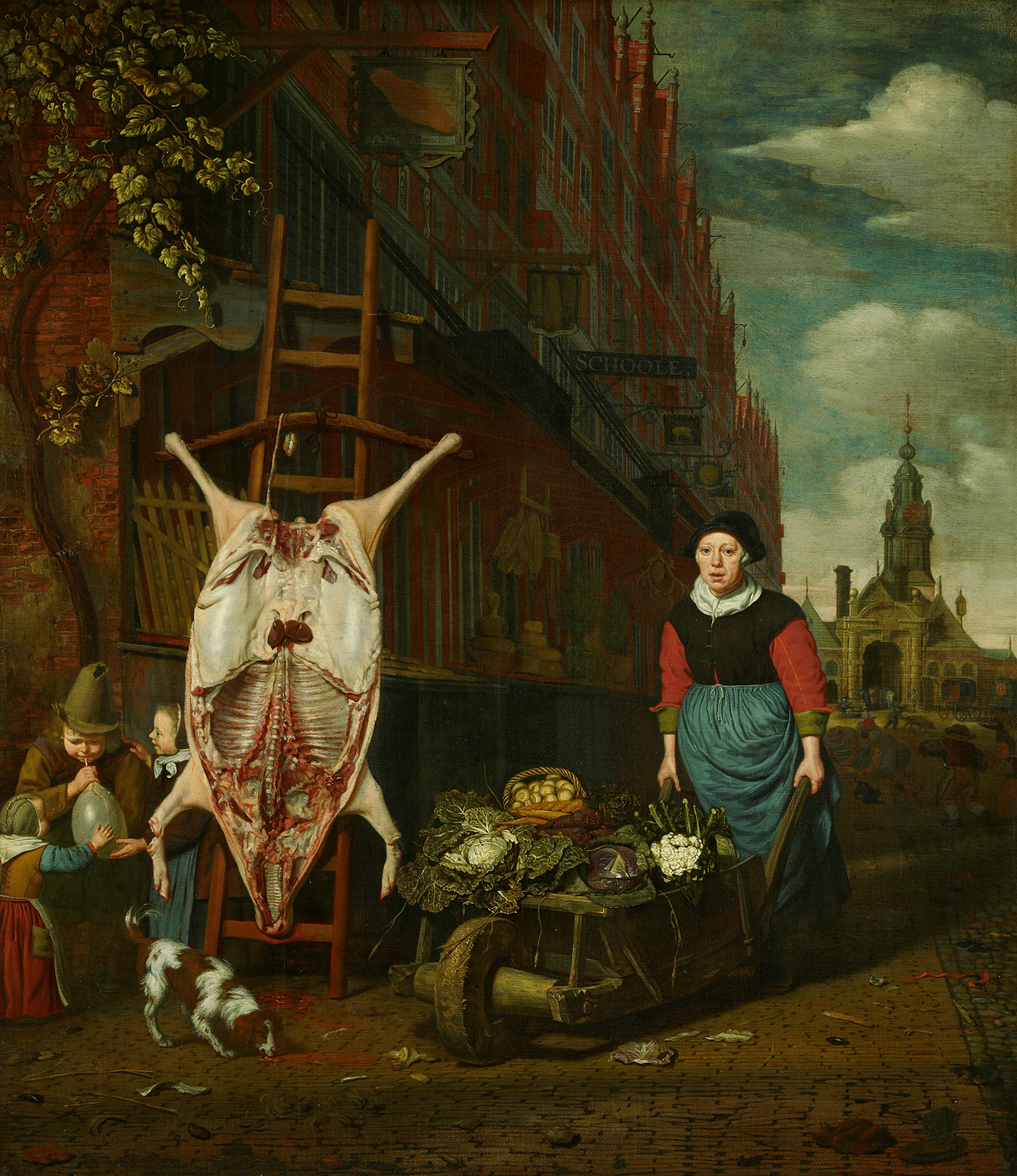
The Haarlemmerdijk with a pig on a stepladder
