= Jacobus Stellingwerff =

Dutch printmaker (1667–1727)

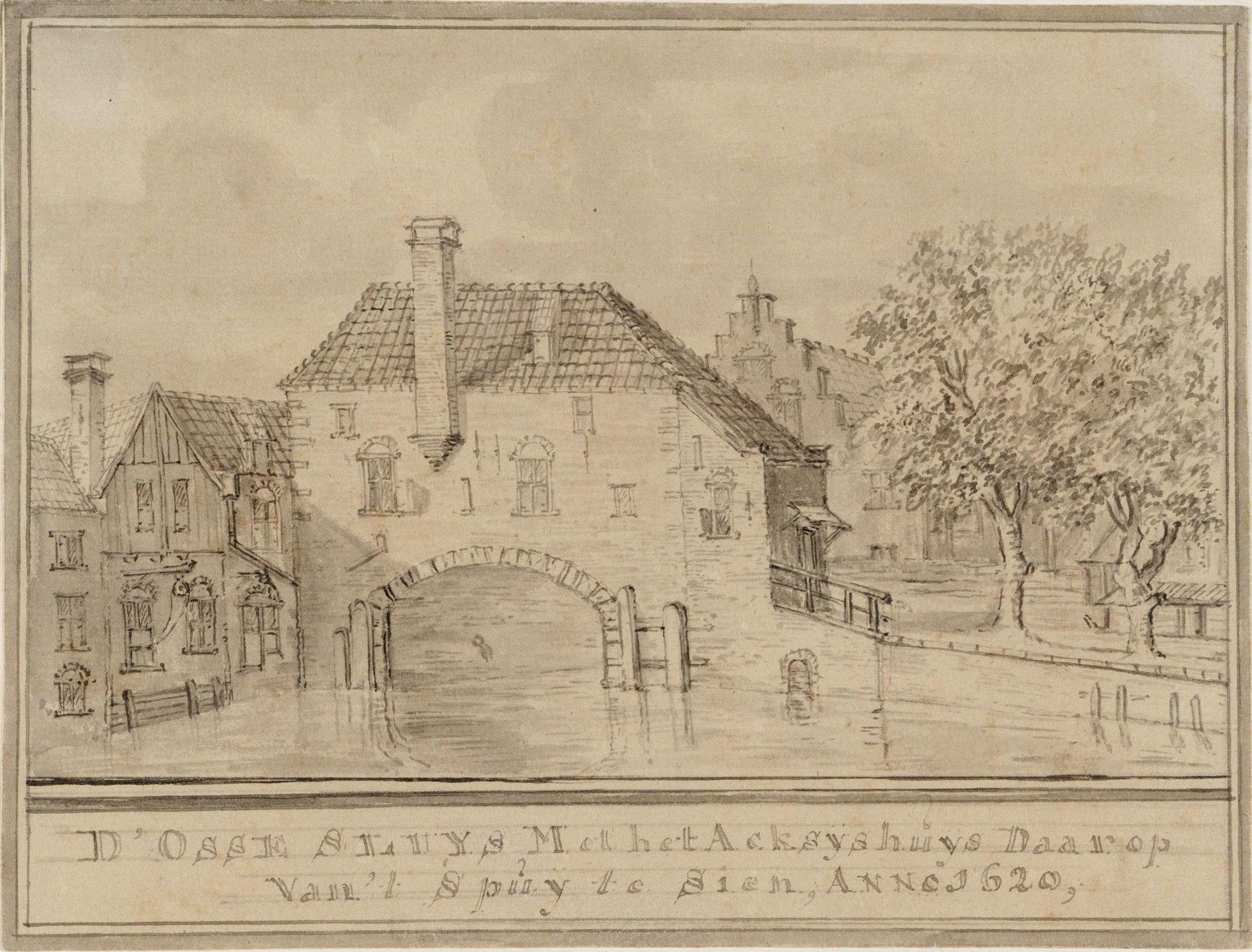
Spui Amsterdam, 1620

Jacobus Stellingwerff (1667, Amsterdam – 1727, Amsterdam), was an 18th-century artist from the Dutch Republic.

== Biography ==
According to the RKD he was a pen draughtsman who made topographical sketches for prints in the style of Roelant Roghman and his sisters. He married Antonina Houbraken, who assisted him in his business. Most of his work, which was copied from sketches by other (sometimes not very accurate) various artists drawing from real life can be seen in the topographical atlas of Matheus Brouërius van Nidek.
