= Jacobus Houbraken =

Dutch engraver (1698–1780)

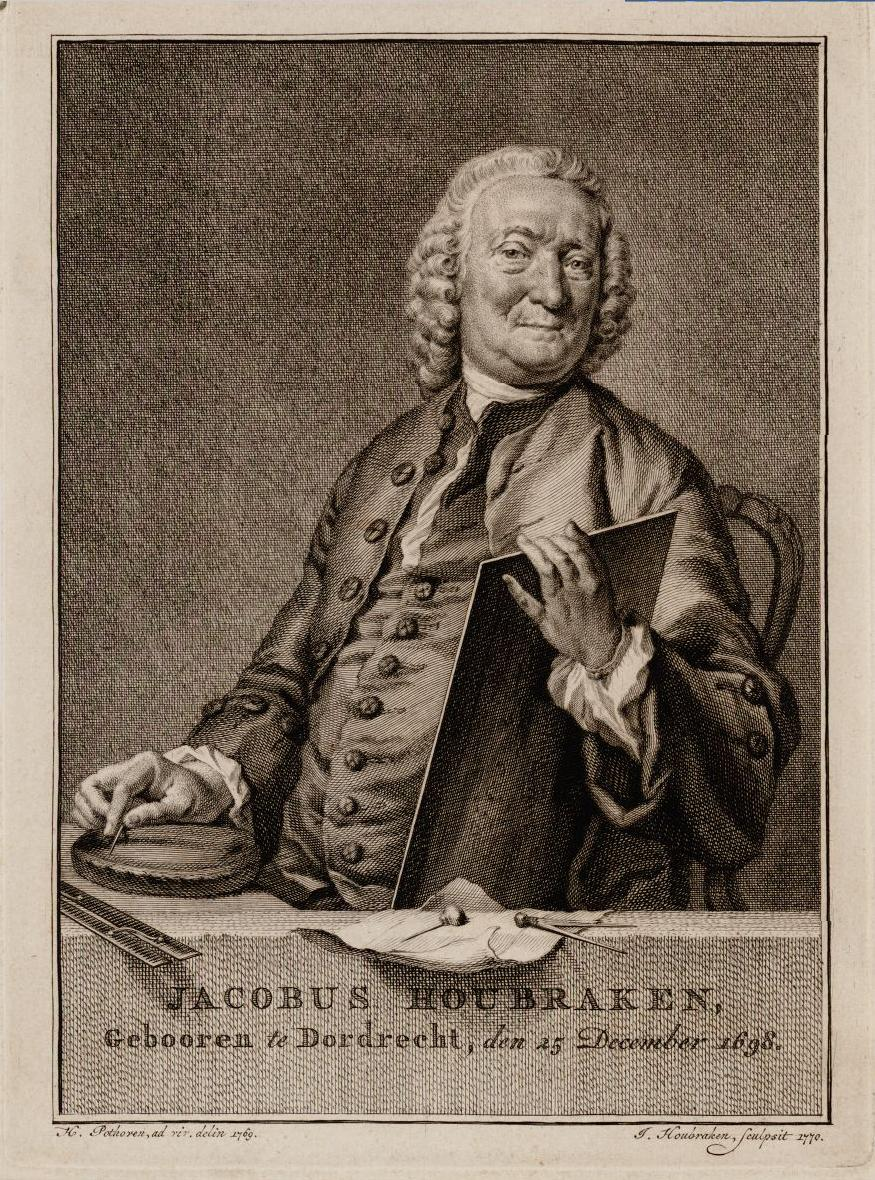
Jacobus Houbraken, self-portrait 1770

Jacobus Houbraken (25 December 1698 – 14 November 1780) was a Dutch engraver and the son of the artist and biographer Arnold Houbraken (1660–1719), whom he assisted in producing a published record of the lives of artists from the Dutch Golden Age.

== Biography ==
Jacobus was born in Dordrecht, and learned the art of engraving from his father. In 1707, he moved to Amsterdam, where for years he helped his father with his magnum opus, his art historical work The Great Theatre of Dutch Painters (1718–1721). When his father died he assisted his mother with the last proofs of the manuscript before publishing. With this project he started his portraits of Netherlandish celebrities, that are today in many cases the only likenesses left of these people. He was influenced by studying the works of Cornelis Cort, Jonas Suyderhoef, Gerard Edelinck and the Visschers. He died, aged 81, in Amsterdam.

== Works ==
Houbraken devoted himself almost entirely to portraiture. His work became famous through his collaboration with the historian Thomas Birch and artist George Vertue, on the project entitled, Heads of Illustrious Persons of Great Britain, published in parts in London from 1743 to 1752. After that, during the years 1752–59 he worked with the historian Jan Wagenaar (1709–1773) on his 21 part Vaderlandsche historie, working for the publisher Isaac Tirion in Amsterdam. With this project of biographies of celebrated figures, he annotated his work with notes about the original paintings.

Among his best works are scenes from the comedy of "De Ontdekte Schijndeugd", executed in his eightieth year, after Cornelis Troost, who was called by his countrymen the Dutch Hogarth. Houbraken also engraved the portraits for Jan van Gool's Nieuwe schouburg der Nederlantsche kunstschilders (Den Haag, 1750–51).

== Legacy ==
His oeuvre of more than 400 portrait engravings form an important record for art provenance. His portraits were often set in an oval frame, with a subtitle with the subject's claim to fame. Under that in small letters, he placed his notes about the original oil portrait. Some examples:

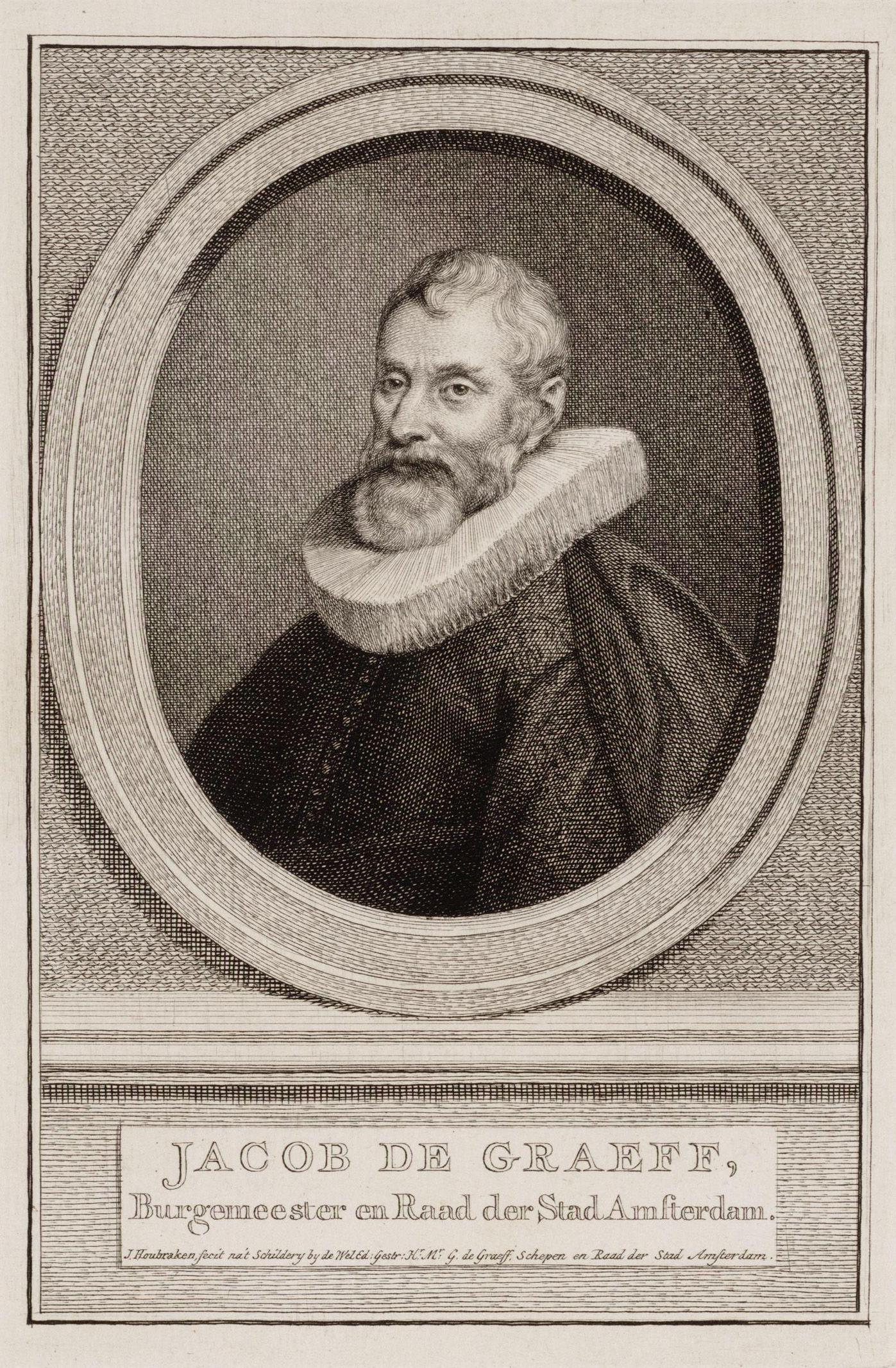
Jacob Dircksz de Graeff after Painting by the WelEd:Gestr:Hr.Mr. G. de Graeff, Aldermen and Council of the City of Amsterdam.

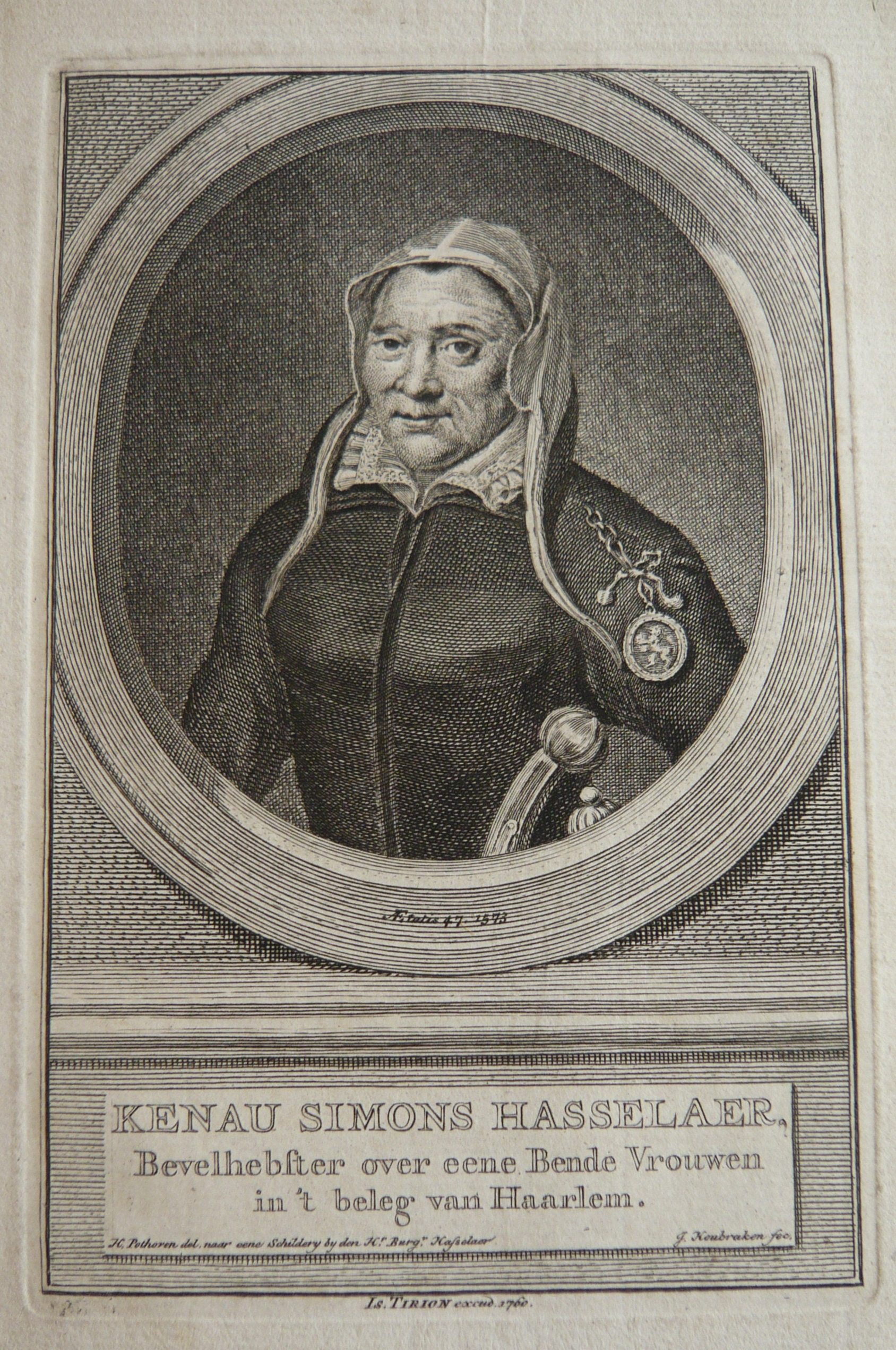
H. Pothoven after a painting by den Hr. Burg.r Hasselaer J. Houbraken fecit

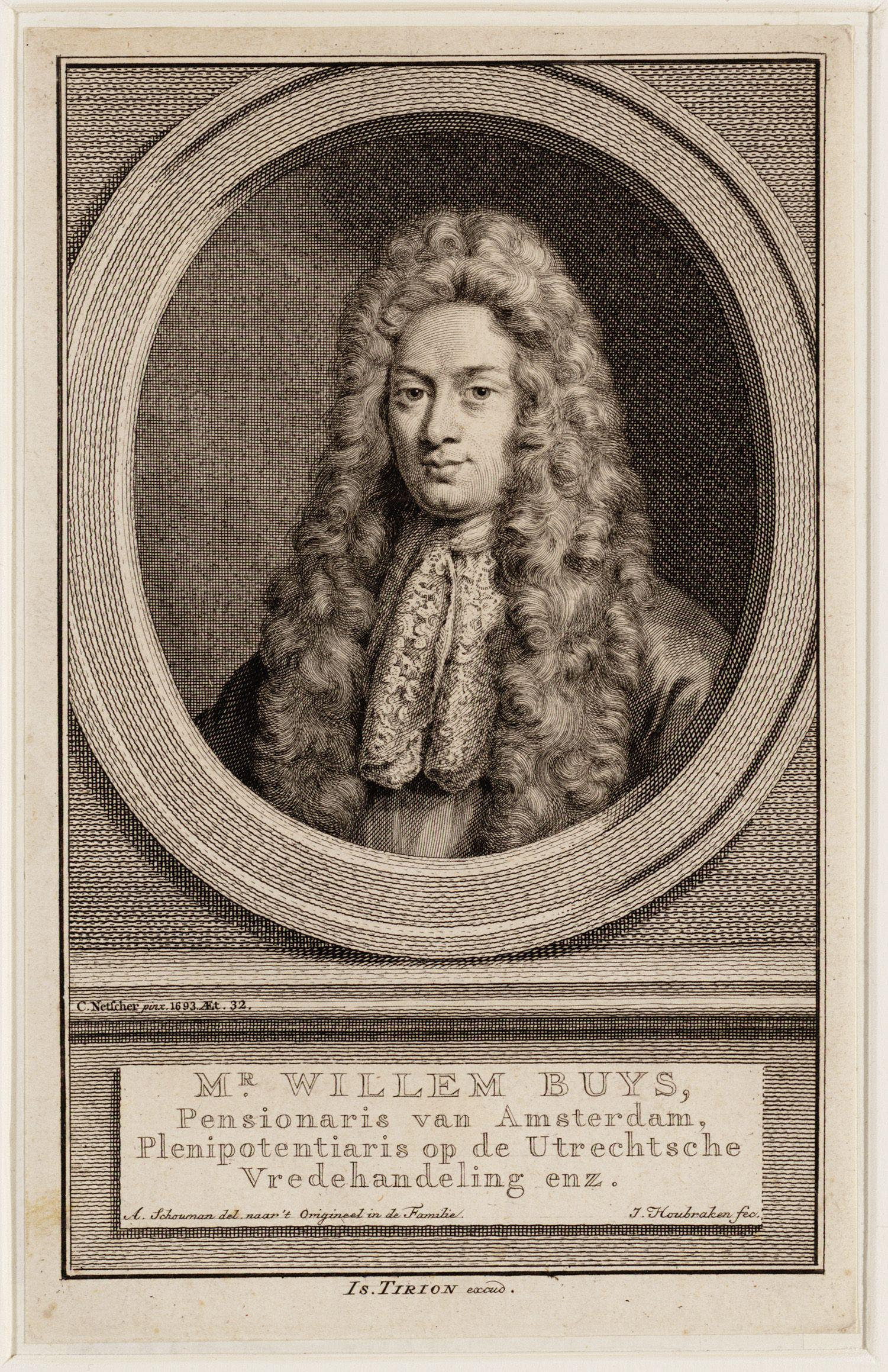
A. Schoumen after the Original in the family of J. Houbraken

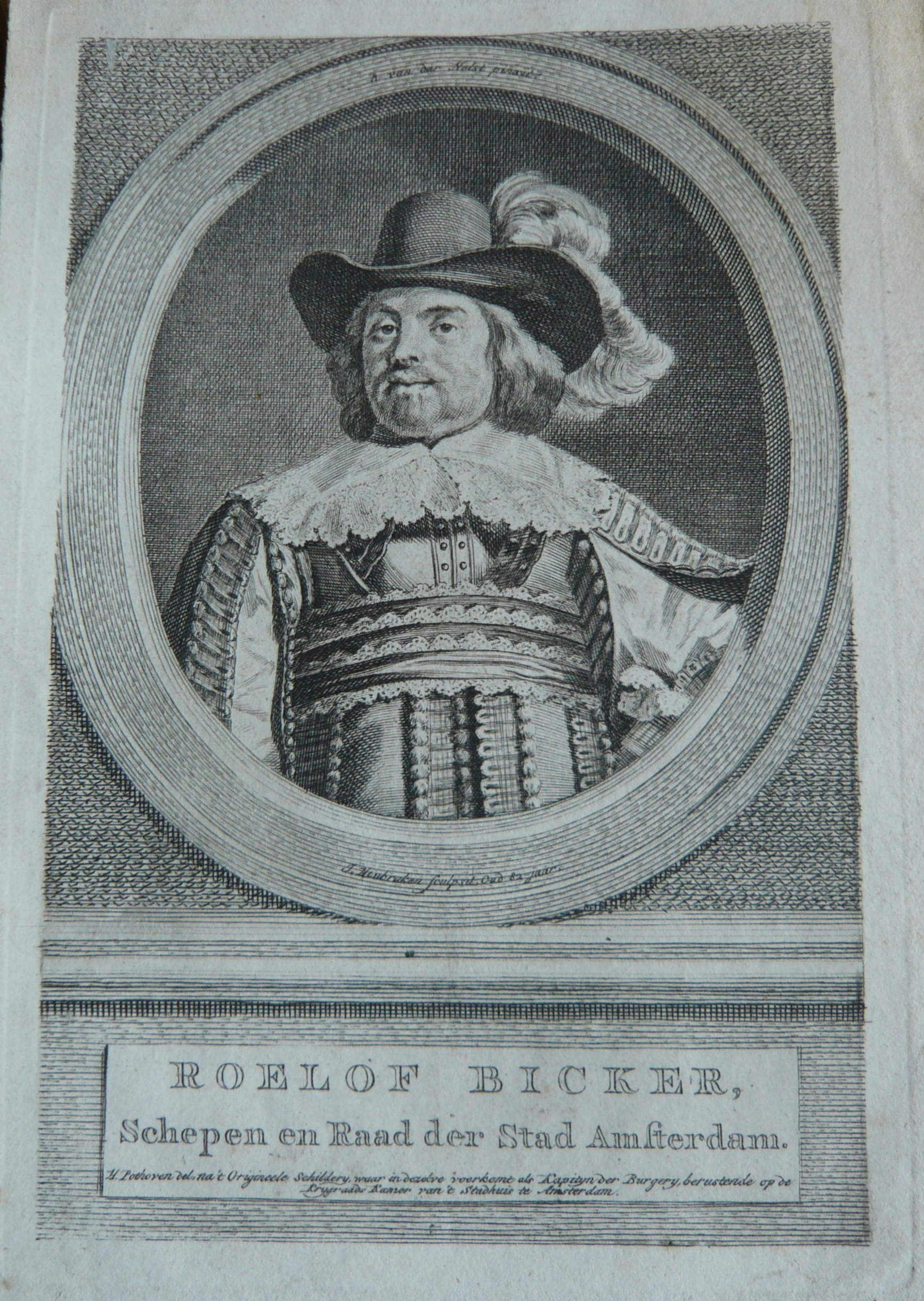
B. van der Helst pinxit J. Houbraken sculpsit, 82 years old, H. Pothoven del. after the Original Painting, in which it appears as Kapitein der Burgerij, based on the Court Martial Chamber of the City Hall in Amsterdam.

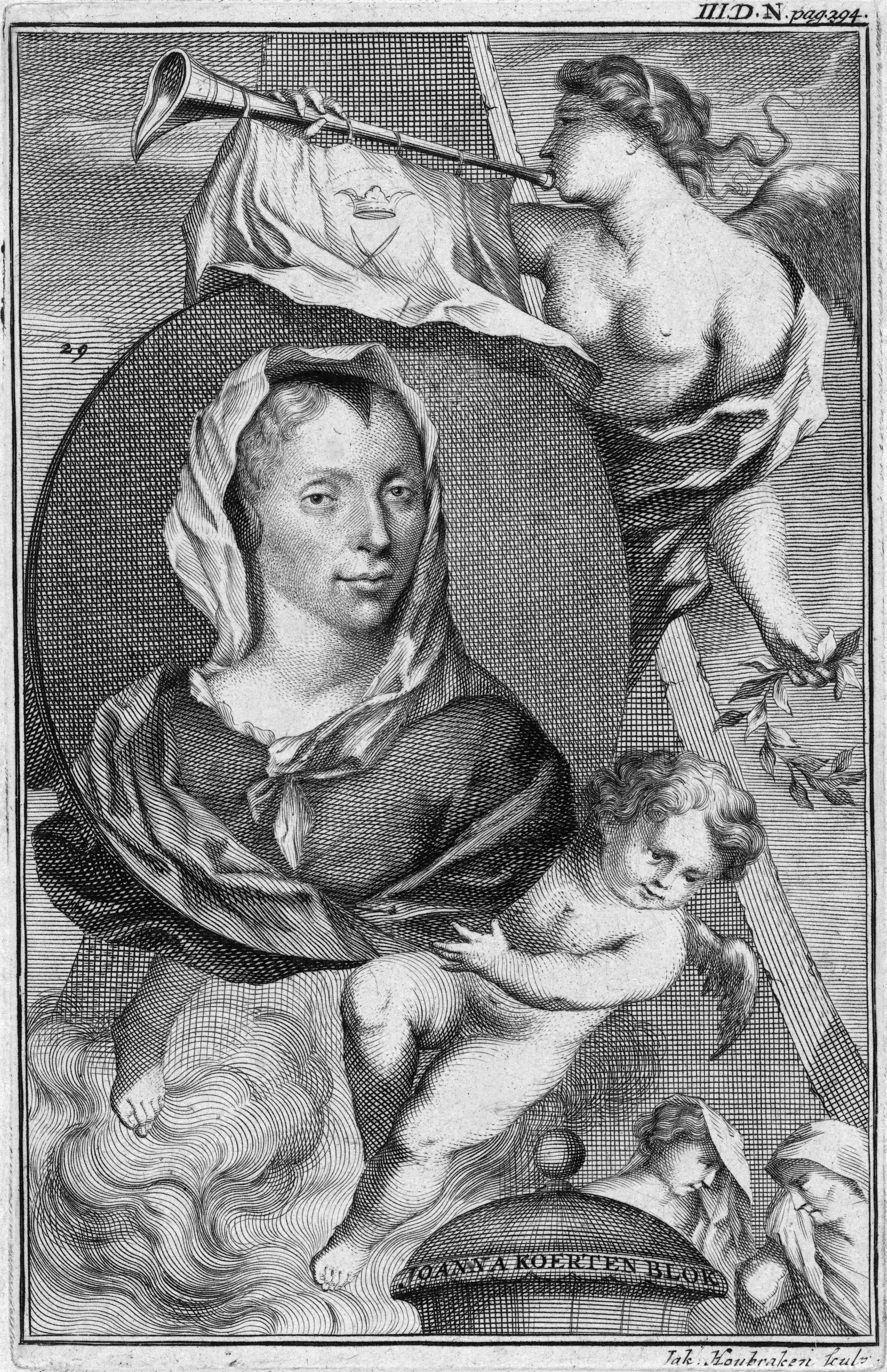
Portrait of the Amsterdam artist Joanna Koerten, (1650–1715)

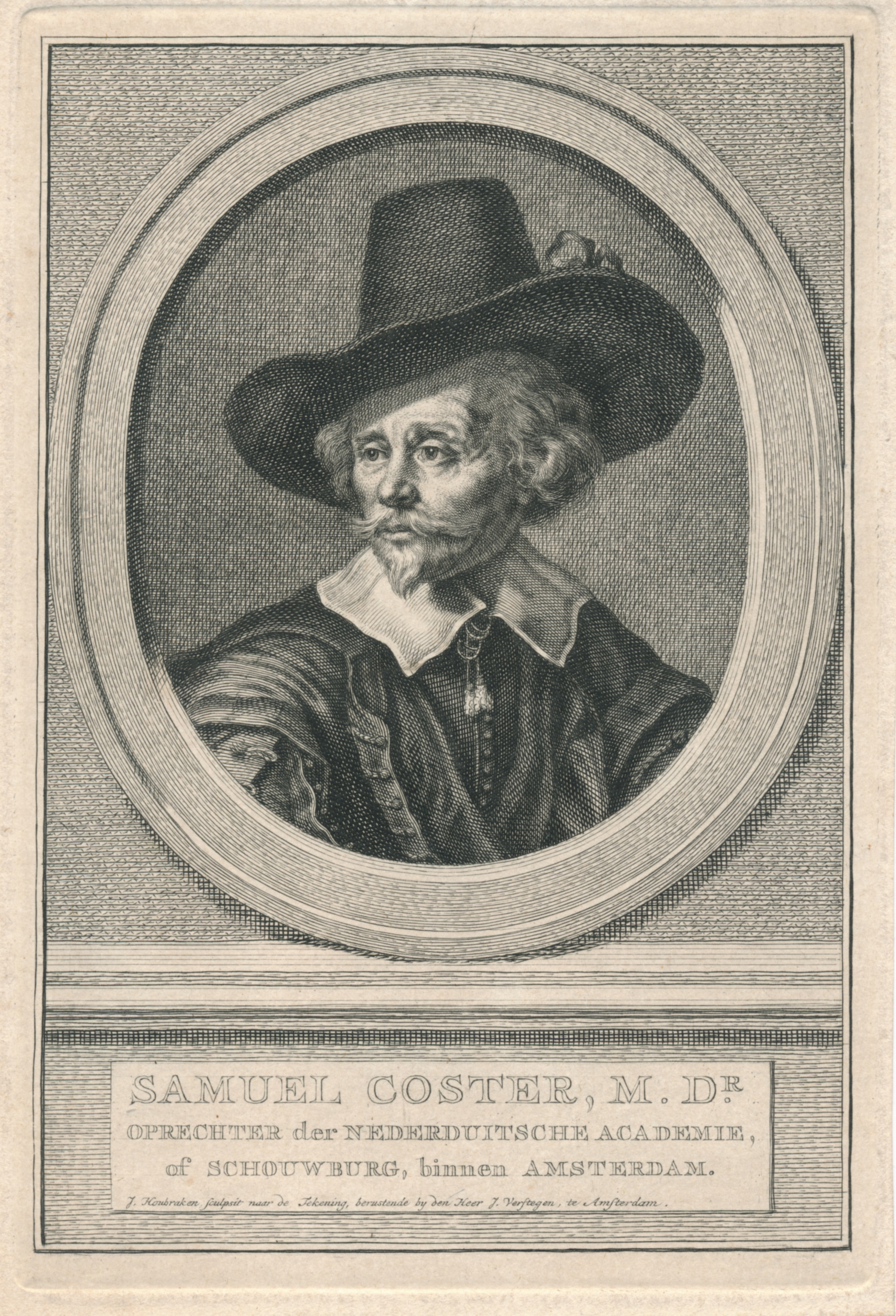
Samuel Coster
(1579–1665)

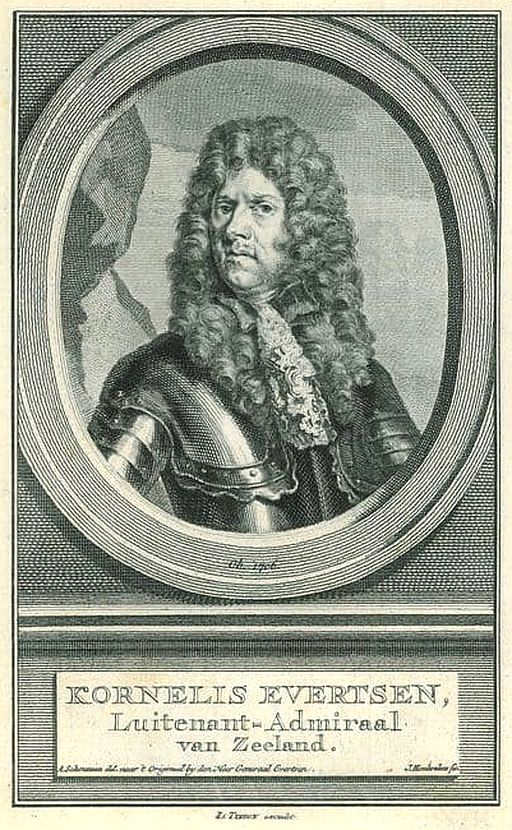
Cornelis Evertsen the Youngest (1642 – 1706)
