= Arnold Houbraken =

Dutch painter (1660–1719)

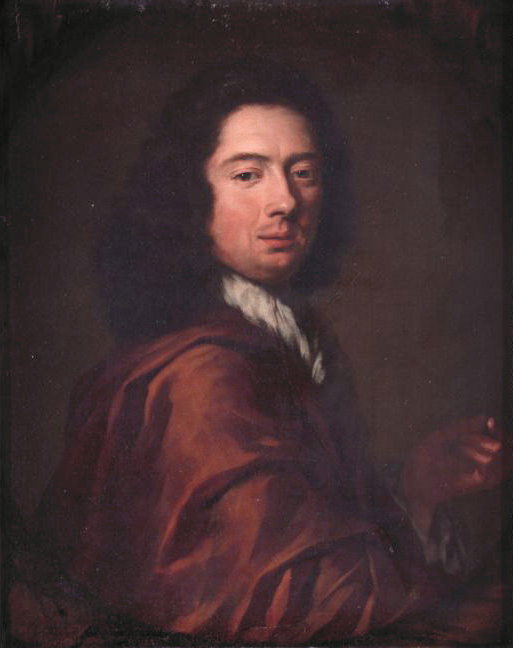
- Attributed to Arnold Houbraken
- Born: 28 March 1660; Dordrecht, Dutch Republic
- Died: 14 October 1719 (aged 59); Amsterdam, Dutch Republic
- Known for: Painting, engraving, art history
- Movement: Dutch Golden Age painting

Arnold Houbraken (28 March 1660 – 14 October 1719) was a Dutch painter and writer from Dordrecht, now remembered mainly as a biographer of Dutch Golden Age painters.

== Life ==
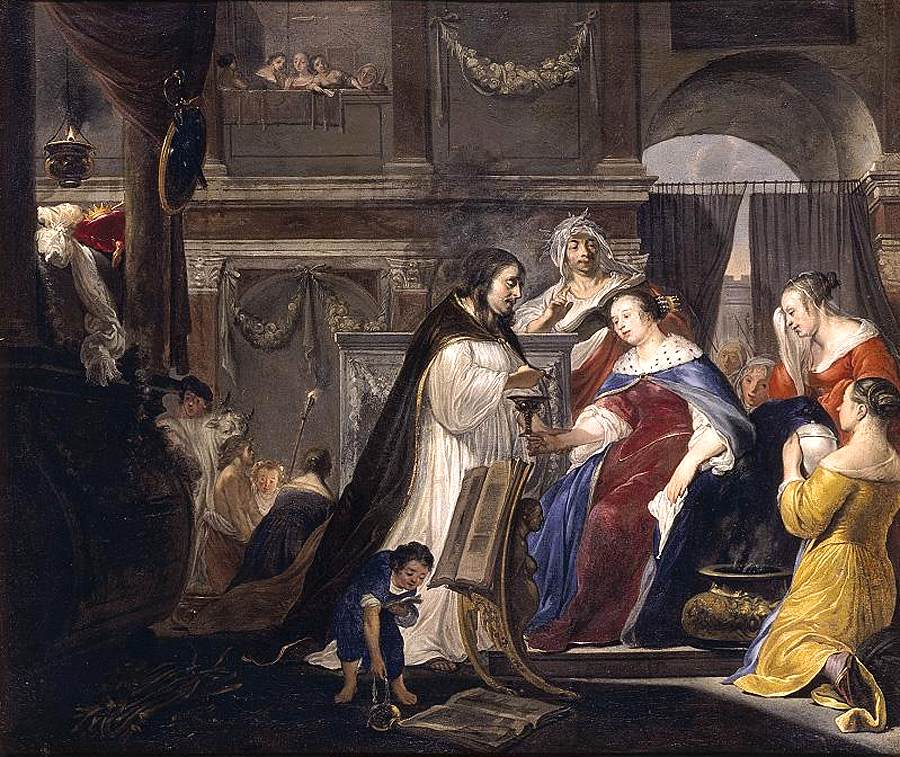
Houbraken portrayal of the Commemoration of King Mausolus by Queen Artemisia.

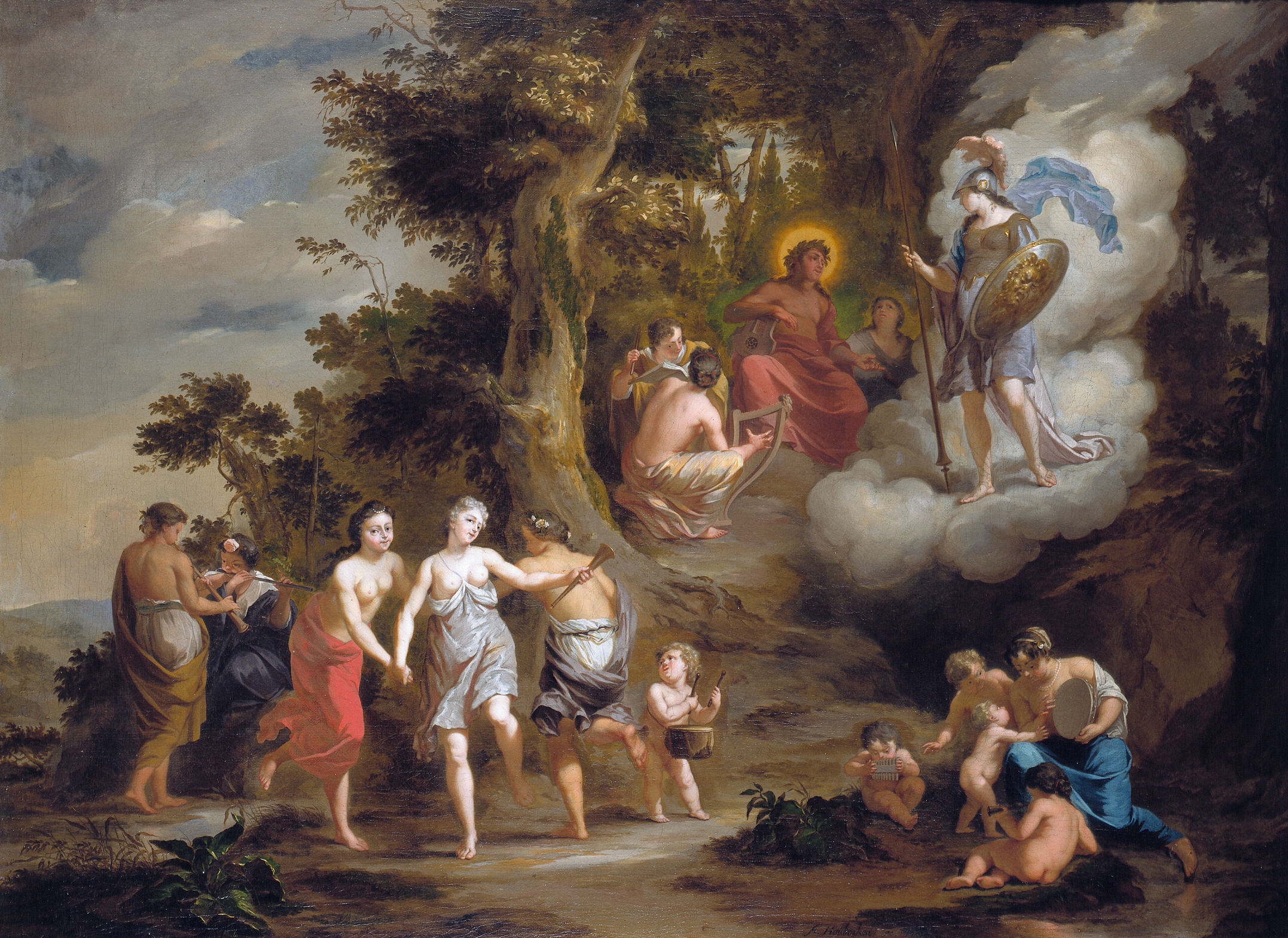
Pallas Athene Visiting Apollo on the Parnassus (1703)

Houbraken was sent first to learn threadtwisting (twyndraat) from Johannes de Haan, who introduced him to engraving. After two years he then studied art with Willem van Drielenburch, who he was with during the rampjaar, the year 1672. He then studied 9 months with Jacobus Leveck and finally, four years with Samuel van Hoogstraten. In 1685 he married Sara Sasbout, and around 1709 he moved from Dordrecht to Amsterdam. Arnold Houbraken painted mythological and religious paintings, portraits and landscapes. He is best known for the art historical work The Great Theatre of Dutch Painters (1718–1721). When he died his son Jacob assisted his mother with the last proofs of the manuscript before publishing. His first attempt at an instructive manual for artists was his Emblem book, Inhoud van 't Sieraad der Afbeelding, which was meant as a guide of possible painting themes. His registered pupils were Matthijs Balen, Johan Graham, and his son Jacob.

== Family ==
Houbraken had ten children. His son Jacobus Houbraken (1698–1780) was an engraver of portraits and book illustrations, including books by his father. His daughter Antonina Houbraken also became an engraver for an Amsterdam publisher, and is known today for her embellishment of cityscapes and buildings with animals and people. His daughter Christina Houbraken was also an artist.

== Legacy ==
Arnold Houbraken's books sold quite well during the entire 18th century. Jacob Campo Weyerman published his updated version (1729–47) in serial form that was published as a complete set in 1769. Houbraken's engravings of the artists are in some cases the only surviving portraits of these people.

The first to make a published sequel to Houbraken's work was Johan van Gool in 1750–51. Though these books published well, with changing fashions, during the course of the 19th century Houbraken fell out of favor with art historians, especially when his sketches were found wanting, incorrect, or even slanderous. Houbraken was very careful to check and double check his sources, and today many of his personal judgements still stand up to our modern scrutiny. Attacks of his judgement due to the spelling of artist's names or accusations that he was nationalistic and deemed all of these artists as "Netherlandish" must be dismissed on the grounds that the various borders between the Netherlands, Germany, and Flanders were far from decided in the period during which he was writing, and spelling conventions in the Netherlands regarding names were only introduced by Napoleonic decree in the 1790s. Excepting those cases where the artist died quite young, or whose oeuvre was lost during various wars, very few artists were included in the Schouburg who do not hang in international museums today.

The first modern art historian to publish an update of his work was Adriaan van der Willigen, in 1866. Since then he has remained a valuable resource for art historians.

The Schouburgh is part of the Basic Library of the dbnl (Database of Dutch Literature) which contains the 1000 most important works in Dutch literature from the Middle Ages to today.

== Public collections ==
- Museum Boijmans Van Beuningen, Rotterdam
- Rijksmuseum Amsterdam

== Bibliography ==
- (1711) Aen den heere Jakob Zeeus, den Wolf in 't schaepsvel ter drukpersse bestellende In: De wolf in 't schaepsvel
- (1712) Inhoud van 't Sieraad der Afbeelding In: Des menschen begin, midden en einde
- (1718) De groote schouburgh der Nederlantsche konstschilders en schilderessen (The Great Theatre of Dutch Painters)
