= Aleida =

Aleida is a female given name. It, like the Dutch name Alida and their variations – Aleid, Aleide, Aleidis, Aleijd, Aleyda, etc. – is derived from the Germanic Adelheid ('noble person'). The medieval names are often translated to Adelayde or Alice in English.

Aleida and its variations may refer to:

== People ==
=== Medieval ===
- Adelaide of Cleves (c.1170–c.1238), also called Aleid, Countess of Holland, wife of Dirk VII
- Aleidis of Leuven (c. 1103–1151), Brabantian Queen consort of England, wife of Henry I
- Aleid van Holland, or Aleida van Avesnes (1228–1284), Dutch regent of Holland
- Aleid van Poelgeest (c.1370–1392), Dutch murdered mistress of the Count of Holland
- Aleydis van Schaarbeek (1204–1250), Brabantian laysister and mystic

=== Modern ===
- Aleida Assmann (born 1947), German academic
- Aleida Greve (1670–1742), Dutch painter
- Aleida Guevara (born 1960), Cuban physician and Marxist, Che Guevara's daughter
- Aleida Leurink (1682–1755), Dutch writer
- Aleida March (born 1937), Che Guevara's Cuban second wife
- Aleida Núñez (born 1981), Mexican actress, singer and model
- Aleyda Ortiz (born 1980), Puerto Rican actress and beauty pageant
- Aleida Mathilda van Keulen (1920–2010), Dutch Resistance member
- Aleida Quintana (born 1987), Mexican human rights activist
- Aleida Alavez Ruiz (born 1974), Mexican politician
- Aleida Wolfsen (1648–1692), Dutch portrait and historical painter

== Fictional characters ==
- Aleida Diaz, a character in the Netflix television series, Orange Is the New Black
- Aleida Rosales, a character in the Apple TV+ series, For All Mankind
