= Alida =

Alida is a feminine given name, a common Dutch version of Adelaide until about 1960. It is a compound word: adal 'noble' + heid 'gleam, glitter'. The name was also common in Norway between 1860 and 1910 when immigration was frequent.

Notable people with the name include:

- Alīda Ābola (born 1954), Latvian orienteering competitor
- Alida van der Anker-Doedens (1922–2014), Dutch canoeist
- Vija Artmane (1929–2008), Latvian actress
- Alida C.M. Besseling (1944–2014), Dutch politician and activist known as Alice Besseling
- Alida Bolten (1903–1984), Dutch swimmer
- Alida van den Bos (1902–2003), Dutch gymnast
- Alida Bosshardt (1913–2007), Dutch Salvation Army officer
- Alida Bowler (1887–1968), American social worker and educator
- Alida Brittain (1883–1943), British musician and journalist
- Alida Chelli (1943–2012), Italian actress, singer, and TV hostess
- Alida Cosijn (1931–2016), Dutch ceramist known as Lies Cosijn
- Alida Edelman-Vlam (1909–1999), Dutch social geographer
- Alida Garcia, American social activist
- Alida Gray (born 1977), American judoka
- Alida Hisku (born 1957), Albanian singer
- Alida Malkus (1888–1976), American writer of children's novels
- Alida Marcovici (born 1973), Romanian volleyball player
- Alida Morberg (born 1985), Swedish actress
- Alida Neave (fl. 1929), South African tennis player
- Alida Olbers Wester (1842–1912), Swedish botanist
- Alida Rockefeller Messinger (born 1948), American philanthropist
- Alida Rouffe (1874–1949), French actress
- Alida Schuyler (1656–1727), New Netherland businessperson
- Lidy Stoppelman (born 1933), Dutch figure skater
- Alida Valli (1921–2006), Italian actress
- Alida Vázquez (1929–2015), Mexican composer
- Alida de Vries (1914–2007), Dutch sprinter
- Alida Withoos (1661–1730), Dutch botanical artist and painter

== See also ==
- Alide (disambiguation), another feminine given name
- Alida (video game)
