= Aletta =

Aletta is a Dutch feminine given name, related to Alida, Adelheid and Adelaide. Alette is a variant form that is also used in Norway. People with the name include:

- Aletta de Frey (1768–1808), Dutch copyist, drawer and painter
- Aletta Hannemans (1606–1653), Dutch brewer portrayed by Frans Hals
- Aletta Jacobs (1854–1929), Dutch physician and women's suffrage activist
- Aletta Jorritsma (born 1989), Dutch rower
- Aletta van Manen (born 1958), Dutch hockey player
- Aletta Norval (born 1960), South African political theorist
- Aletta Ocean (born 1987), Hungarian model

== See also ==
- 1194 Aletta, asteroid, named after Maria Aletta Lessing Jackson, wife of the discoverer
- Hurricane Aletta, the name of several tropical cyclones
