= Vrouwenhuis =

Coordinates: 52°30′47.52″N 6°5′23.19″E

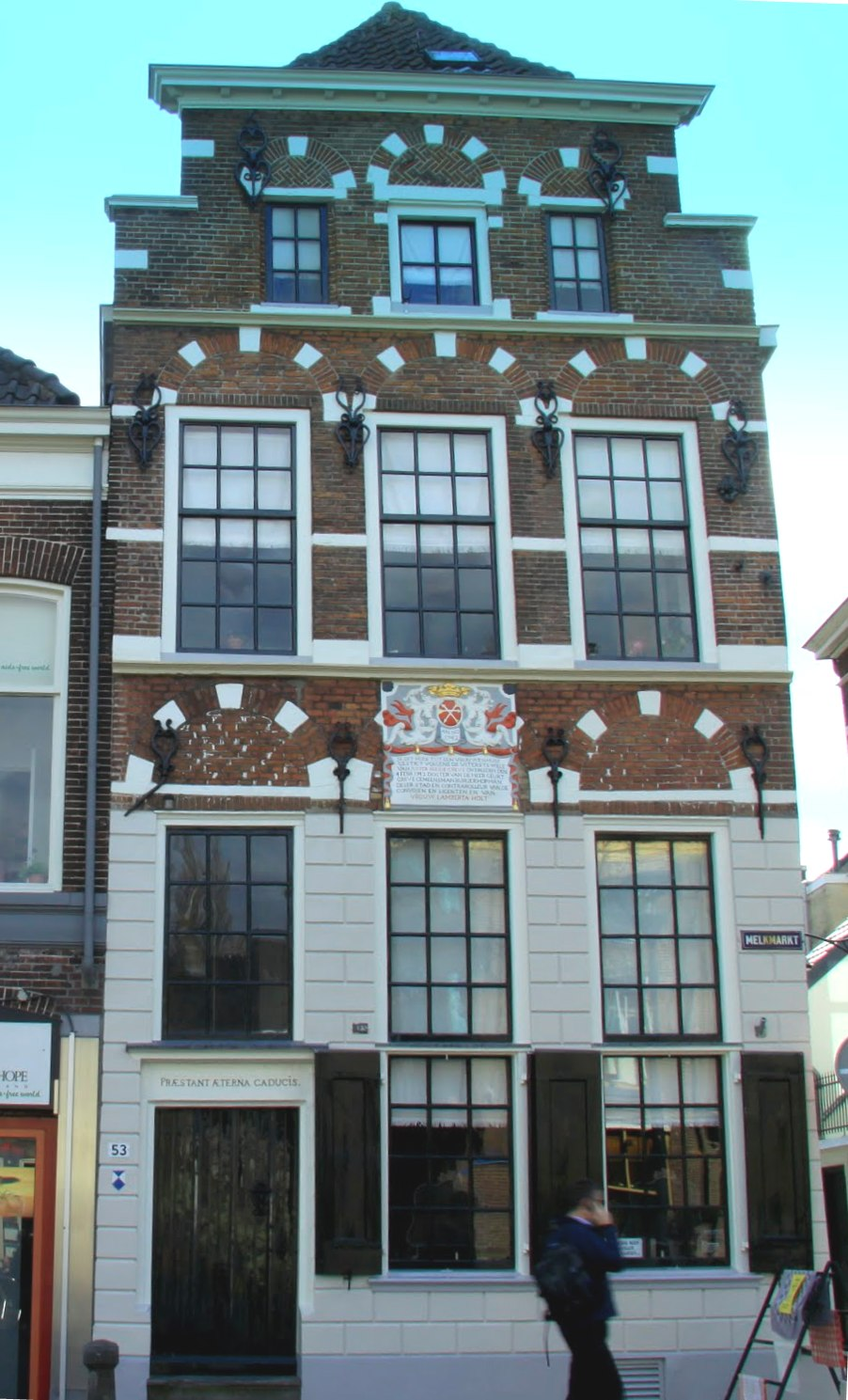
Vrouwenhuis

The Vrouwenhuis on Melkmarkt 53 in the Dutch city of Zwolle is a former old age home for women. It is now rented as separate apartment units for students, while housing a small museum on the ground floor that is only accessible by special request.

== History ==
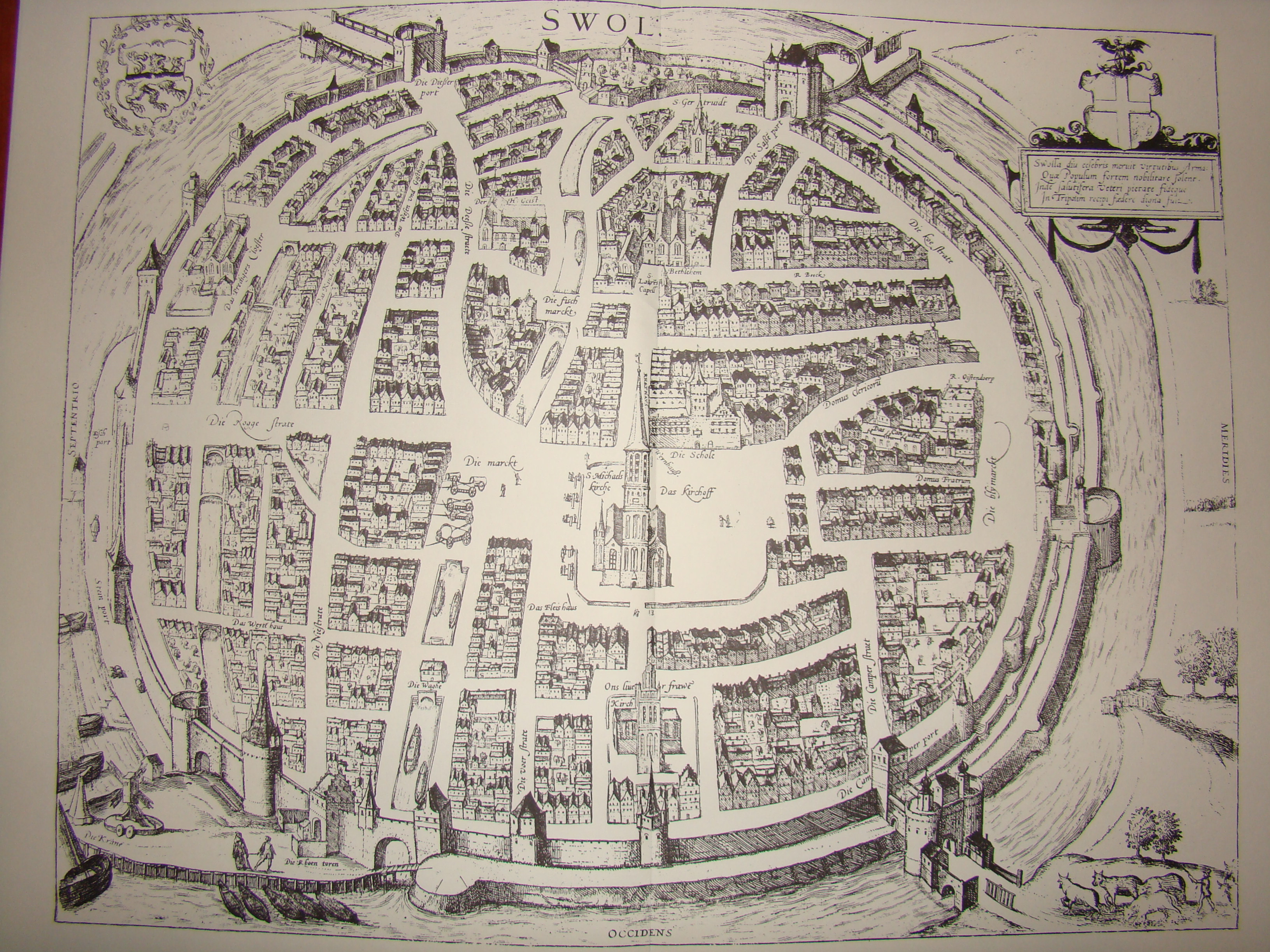
Map of Zwolle in 1572 shows two "water gates", one for the smaller "Kleine Aa", and the Waterpoort for the "Grote Aa". A ship is moored in front of what would later become the Vrouwenhuis.

The house originally faced the harbour, near the old weigh house that served as a portage point for ships travelling the IJssel river. The harbour was part of the Grote Aa waterway, a tributary of the Zwarte Water running through the city, which was filled in after cholera outbreaks in the 19th century. In the 1572 map of Zwolle a ship is shown moored in front of this house, which was strategically located next to the Waterpoort, a city gate allowing the passage of ships.

== Wolfsen family owners ==
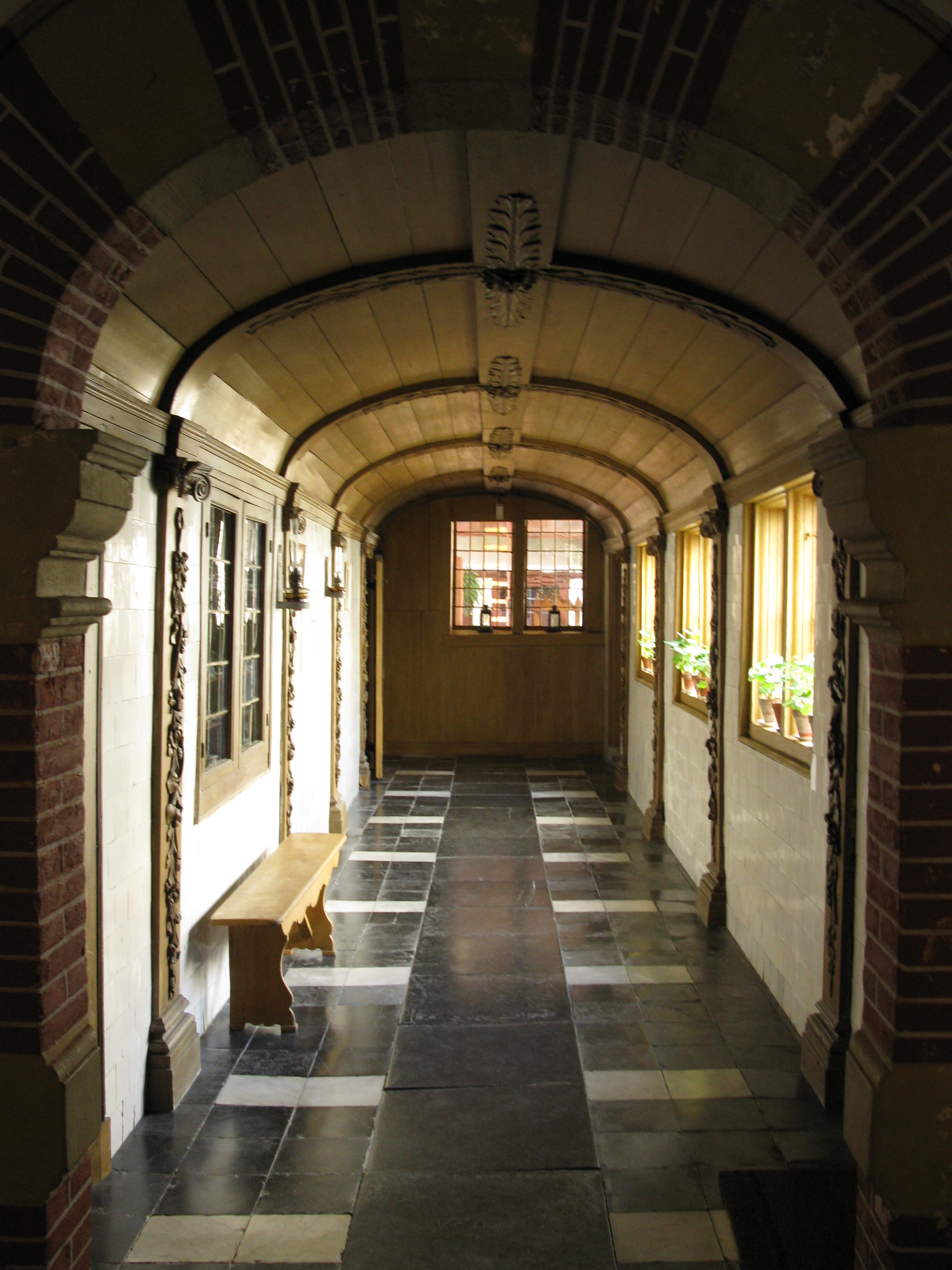
Hallway linking the front house to the rear house, added by Soury-Wolfsen family

The house was bought in 1645 by the young lawyer Hendrik Wolfsen (1615–1684), the wealthy son of a councilman (Rijkman) in Zwolle. Hendrik kept a diary in the 1640s until 1649 when he became magistrate of Zwolle. The facade of his house was improved in the early 17th century, probably according to his instructions. His daughter, the painter Aleijda Wolfsen, was born there on 22 October 1648. From 1650–1656, he became a representative to the Staten Generaal and stayed for weeks at a time in The Hague. In 1657, he moved his family to the Hague when he was promoted to member of the high court of the Duchy of Brabant. He kept the house in Zwolle, and when his daughter Aleijda married Pieter Soury (later mayor of Zwolle) in 1667 in Rijswijk, he gave her the house on the Grote Aa in exchange for the couple's possessions in the Hague.

The couple had several children, and in 1680 they made improvements to the house, most notably building the hallway attaching the front house to the rear house, so that they could house their extended family. The extra space was probably also necessary as a studio for Aleijda, who continued to paint after her marriage. Her sitting room, the "Grote Sael" (later the regent's room) with its carved mantelpiece, and the carved wood decorations and marble floors in the hallway were all added during Aleijda's lifetime.

== Wilhelmus Beurs in Zwolle in 1686 ==
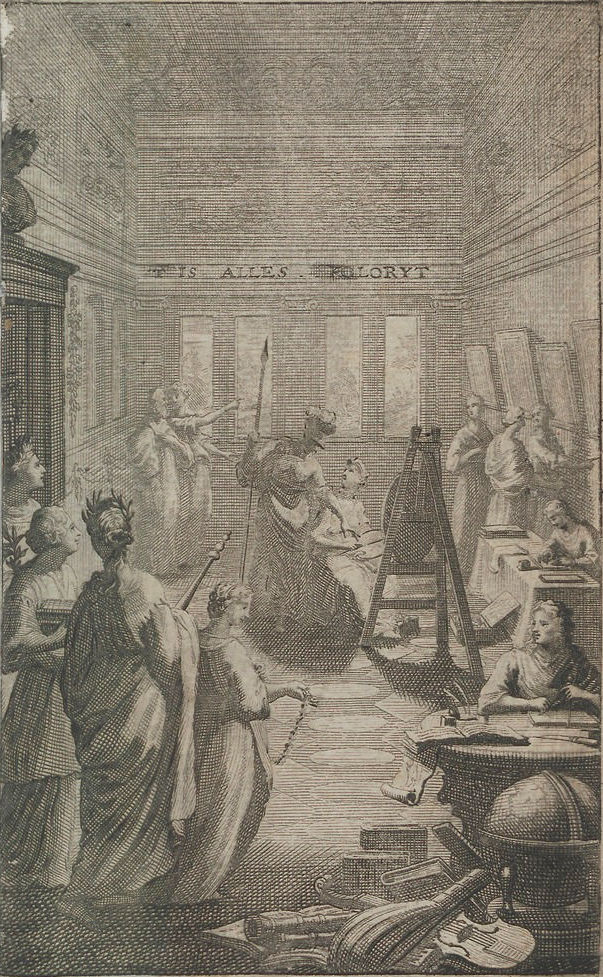
Frontispiece to "De groote waereld in 't klein geschildert", a book on painting by Beurs published in 1692. This shows three ladies painting square-shaped canvases and looking at a woman model dressed as Pictura

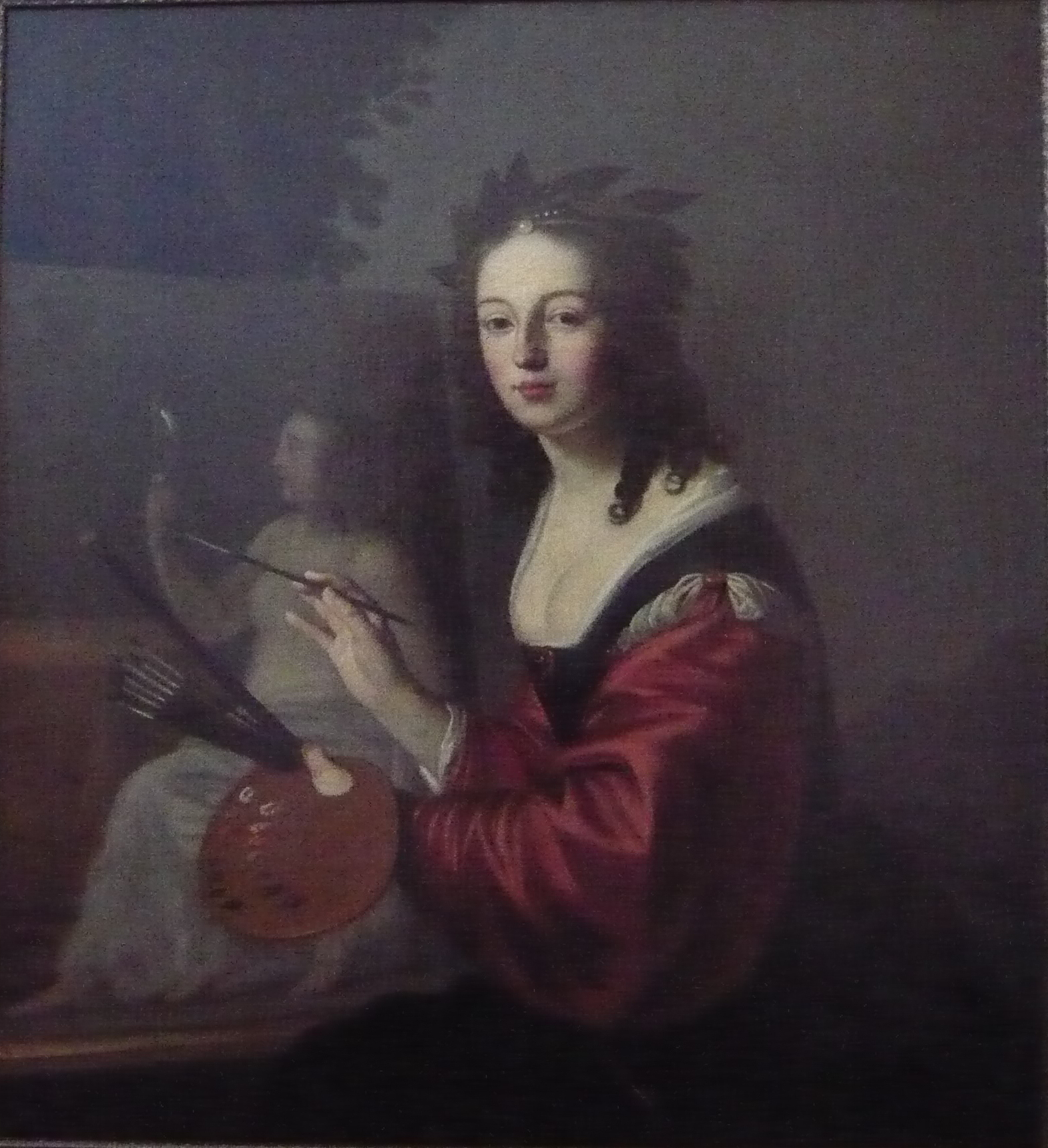
Square shaped selfportrait of a female artist as Pictura. Dated around 1675 and made in Zwolle, this painting hangs a few houses further away in the Stedelijk Museum Zwolle

Aleijda was not the only woman painting in Zwolle. Gesina ter Borch lived and worked on the Sassenstraat, and her contemporary Eva van Marle had been active as a portrait painter in the 1650s. In 1686, the small painting school of Wilhelmus Beurs began; his pupils were the half-sisters Cornelia van Marle and Aleida Greve, Sophia Holt, and Anna Cornelia Holt. Works by these women dated 1686 are on display in the regent's room. In the frontispiece to a book on painting that Beurs published in 1692 and dedicated to his four pupils, three women are portrayed in a room gazing at three paintings that are the same size as those they created under his instruction.

Though Beurs appears to have been very proud of his pupils, whom he taught for 4 years, it is probable that before he arrived in Zwolle they had received instruction from another painter, such as Wolfsen or Ter Borch.

== Aleida Greve ==
Aleijda Wolfsen died in childbirth with her fifteenth pregnancy in 1692. The house on the Melkmarkt was purchased from her husband's heirs in 1706 by Aleida Greve and her younger sisters. An unmarried aunt came to live with them and at age 49 in 1718, Greve drew up her will, in which she outlined her plan to use her legacy to create a retirement home for 17 women of the Dutch Reformed faith and their governess.

== Old age home ==
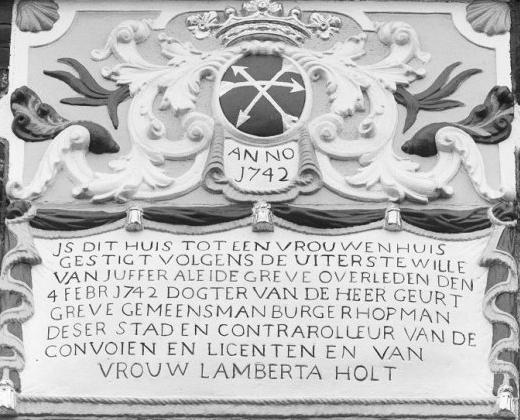
Roccoco gable stone on Melkmarkt 53, stating that this women's home was founded by the last will of Aleide Greve who died 4 Febr 1742, the daughter of Geurt Greve - councilman, hopman, and controller of convoys and licenses in this city, and also daughter of Lamberta Holt

In 1742 Greve died childless, and her old age home for women was created; this is commemorated on the gable stone in the front of the house. The stone was commissioned by Gerrijt Willem Golts, the first regent, who also oversaw the conversion of the complex to homes for 17 (later 12, today 5) single women with a common kitchen. Aleida's sitting room became the regent's room. The house functioned as a retirement home for women from 1742 when the first inhabitant was Aleida Greve's elderly servant. The director G.W. Golts was a cousin by marriage to Greve, and descendants of their family were regents until 1916, when a new set of regents were appointed. With the increase in public services in the 20th century, the need for private initiatives to help the poor decreased, and the Vrouwenhuis closed as a charitable institution for elderly ladies in 1984. Since 1987, the ground floor and the majority of the oldest part of the house function as a museum, while a few former ladies' rooms are let to young women.

The current director is the artist and art historian Saskia Zwiers, who has conducted research into the paintings and artists of the collection. She has built a period-style dollhouse in the style of Dutch show-dollhouses of the 18th century. The rooms are modelled on the Vrouwenhuis, where it is on display.

== Art collection ==
Aleida Greve's will stipulated that her sitting room with all of its paintings and furnishings had to remain intact, and this is the reason that this art collection with all of its curiosities still exists in its entirety as a "time capsule" of a lady's art gallery. It is not clear if the paintings on display in the house were all painted or collected by the sisters or if some of the paintings had been left by Aleida Wolfsen. The most famous painter represented in the collection besides the ladies themselves is Peter van den Velde, who signed his View of Gibraltar and is the probable painter behind two more marine views in the collection.

== Gallery ==
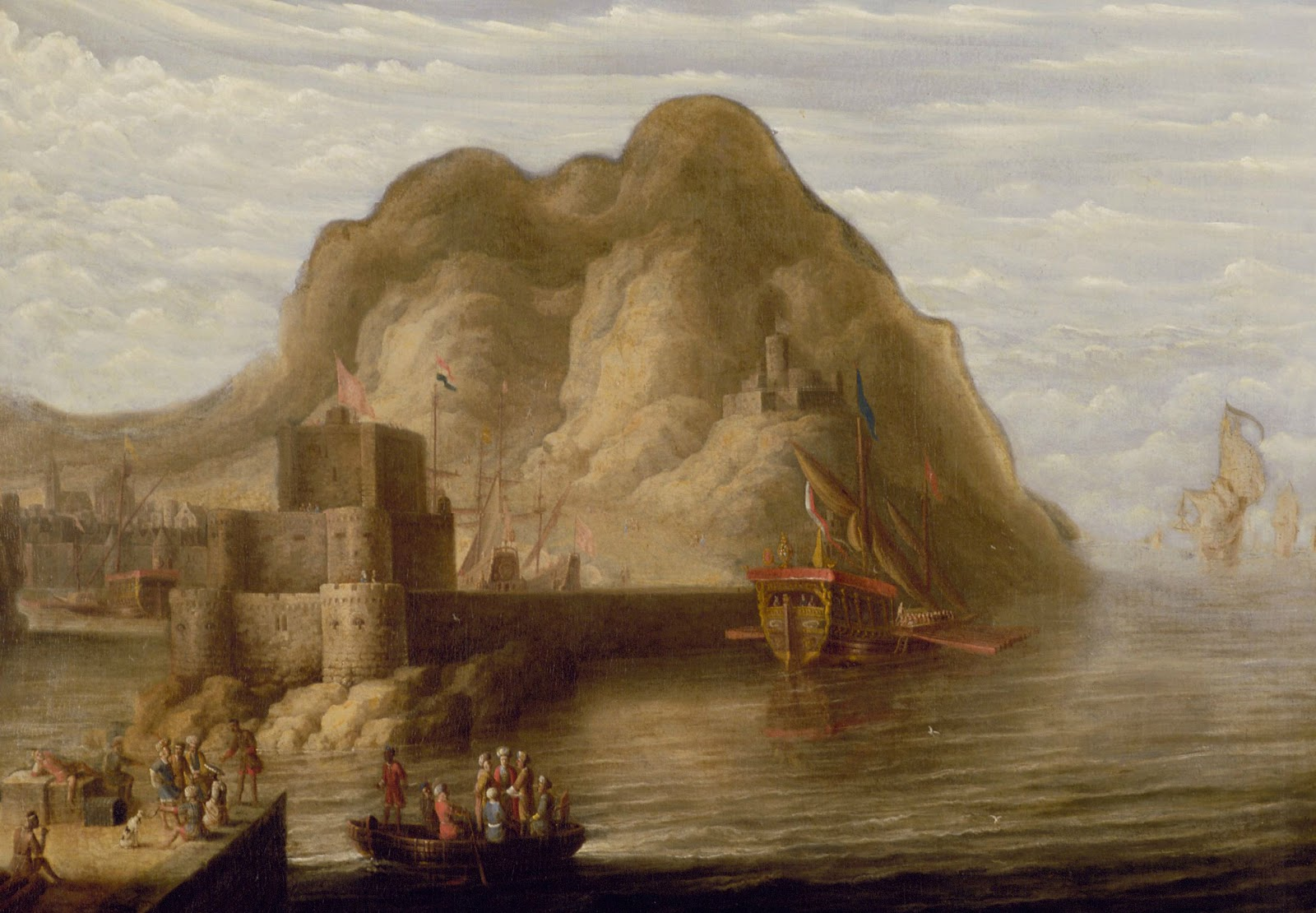
View of Gibraltar in the regent's room, by Peter van de Velde

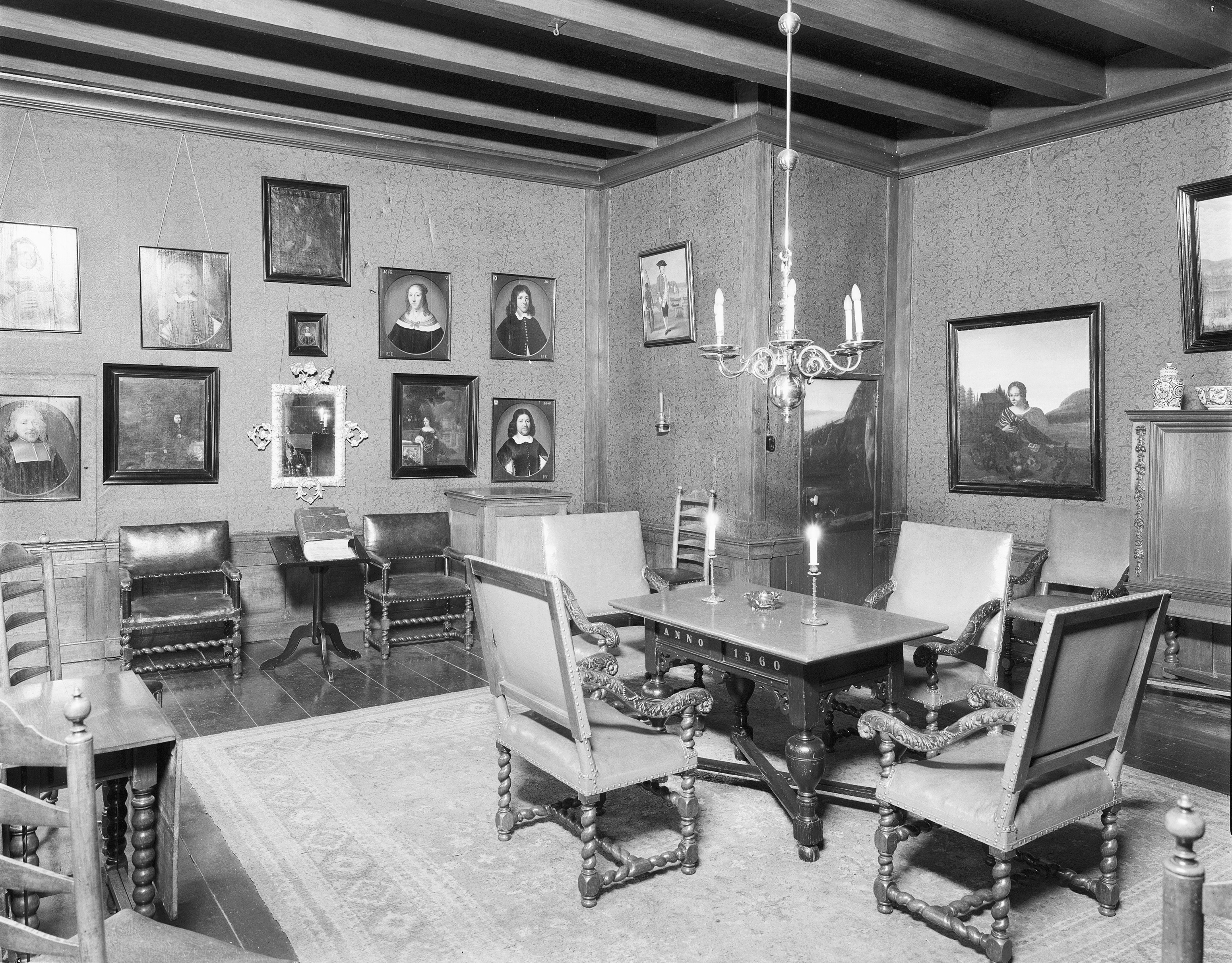
Regent's room in 1981
