= Vladdo =

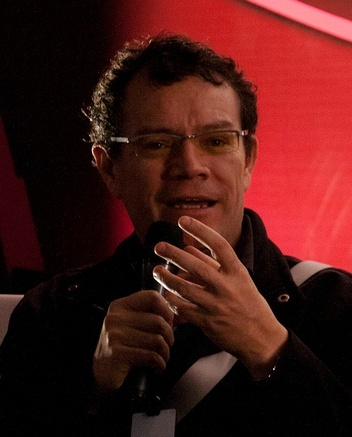

Vladimir Flórez also known as Vladdo (born 1963) is a Colombian cartoonist and political satirist. His work is published in the Colombian weekly magazine Revista Semana and has received numerous journalistic awards including 3 National Journalistic Awards (Premio Nacional de Periodismo) and an Excellency Award (Premio de Excelencia) by the Inter American Press Association in the "Cartoon" category.

== Aleida ==
He created his feminine character called Aleida in 1997. She is a harsh interpretation of the feminine behaviour who criticizes men and uses cynicism to make fun of herself. Her frames have many followers not only in Colombia but also in other Latin American countries as well as in the whole world. Vladdo runs the monthly satire newspaper "Un Pasquín", which is delivered for free.

== Works ==
Vladdo has written three books of caricature and politics.

Mis Memorias, 1989 Vladdografías, 1996 Lo mejor de lo peor, 2002
