= Alida (disambiguation) =

Alida is a feminine given name. It may also refer to:

== Places ==
- Alida, Indiana, United States, an unincorporated community
- Alida, Kansas, United States, a ghost town
- Alida, Minnesota, United States, an unincorporated community
- Alida, Saskatchewan, Canada, a village named for Lady Alida Brittain

== Other uses ==
- Alida (video game), a 2004 adventure game
- USS Alida (YT-102), a US Navy tug from 1912 to 1921

== See also ==
- Alide (disambiguation)
