= Olbers (disambiguation) =

- 13P/Olbers, a periodic comet
- Alida Olbers Wester, Swedish botanist
- Heinrich Wilhelm Matthias Olbers was a German astronomer
- Olbers (crater), on the Moon
- Olbers, a 200 km diameter dark albedo feature on 4 Vesta's surface
- Olbers' paradox, evidence for a finite, dynamic universe, based on the luminosity of the night sky
