= Sophia Holt =

Dutch painter

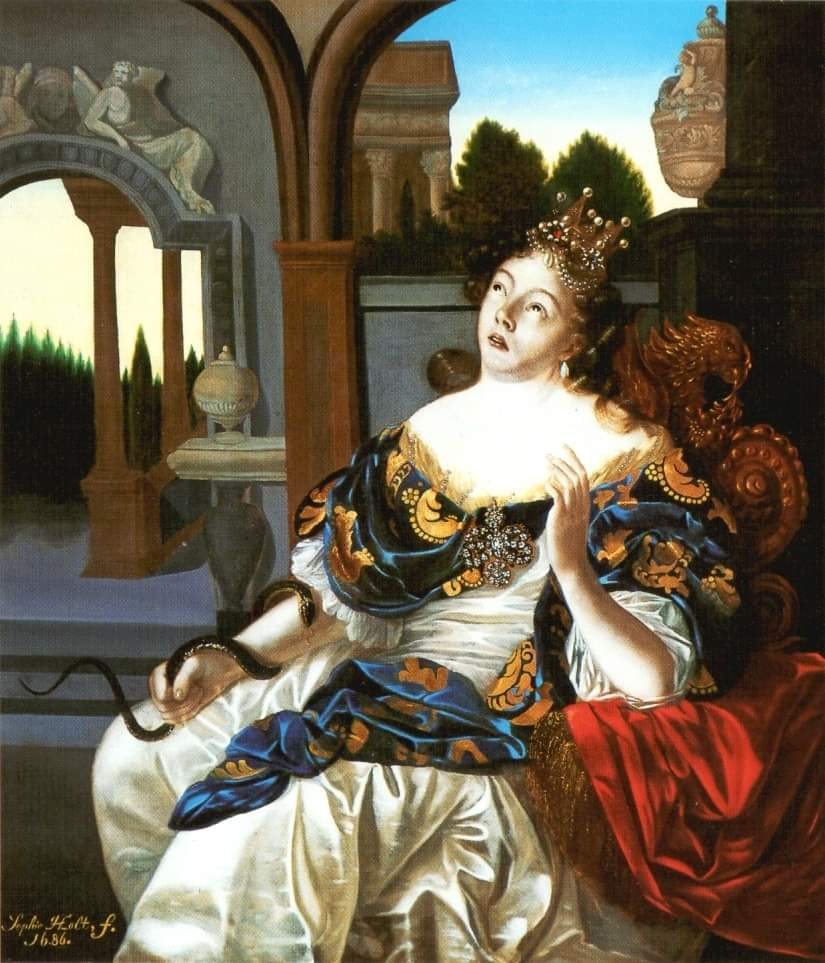
Cleopatra's Suicide, 1686, Regent's room, Vrouwenhuis

Sophia Holt (1658 – 1734) was a painter from the Dutch Republic.

== Biography ==
Holt was born in Zwolle as the daughter of the city secretary Johan Holt. Along with her cousins Aleida Greve, Anna Cornelia Holt and Cornelia van Marle, she followed drawing and painting lessons in the Zwolle studio of Wilhelmus Beurs, who dedicated his book "De groote waereld in 't kleen geschildert" to this group of women. He put Sophia's name at the top, and mentioned that she was the housewife of Mattheus Noppen, whom she had married in 1689.

According to the RKD she was the pupil of Wilhelmus Beurs for 4 years. Her husband was a Dutch Reformed minister who was originally from Norwich and who came to Zwolle in 1686. He wrote a poem in the album of Joanna Koerten.

Her historical allegory of Cleopatra committing suicide by asp is set among a fantasy landscape of architectural elements and her dress is characterized by satin folds reminiscent of the work of her contemporary Gesina ter Borch.
