= Anna Holt =

Anna Holt may refer to:

- Anna Holt, a fictional character created by Leif G. W. Persson (born 1945), Swedish criminologist and novelist
- Anna Holt (TV series), a 1996 Swedish TV series, based on the above character
- Anna Cornelia Holt (1671–1692), Dutch painter

== See also ==
- Anne Holt (born 1958), Norwegian author, lawyer and politician
