= De Beurs =

De Beurs may refer to:

- De Beurs (Harlingen), a former hotel on the Noorderhaven Harlingen
- De Beurs (1635), an exhibition center in Rotterdam from 1635 to 1736
- De Beurs (1736), an exhibition center in Rotterdam from 1736 to 1940
- Beurs van Berlage, a national monument, located on the Damrak and la Bourse in Amsterdam

== See also ==
- Wilhelmus Beurs (1656 – 1700), a Dutch Golden Age painter
