= Alette (given name) =

Alette is a feminine given name and nickname. It may refer to:

== People ==
=== Given name ===
- Alette Coble-Temple, American psychologist
- Alette Engelhart (1896–1984), Norwegian housewives' leader
- Alette Schreiner (1873–1951), Norwegian researcher
- Alette Sijbring (born 1982), Dutch water polo player

=== Nickname ===
- Alethe Alette Due (1812–1887), Norwegian singer and composer
- Esther Alette Pos (born 1962), Dutch hockey player

== Fictional characters ==
- the title character of The Descent of Alette, a 1992 book-length poem by Alice Notley
- Alette Claretie, a playable character in Atelier Sophie 2: The Alchemist of the Mysterious Dream, a 2022 Japanese role-playing video game
