= Willem van Drielenburg =

17th-century Dutch Golden Age painter

Willem van Drielenburg (1632, Utrecht – c. 1687, Dordrecht), was a Dutch Golden Age painter.

== Biography ==
According to Arnold Houbraken he was a pupil of Abraham Bloemaert who later took to landscape painting in the manner of Jan Both. He came to live in Dordrecht in 1668 and Houbraken became his pupil in the Rampjaar 1672. Houbraken didn't learn much that year, because the unrest in the city was such that Drieleburg was constantly sending him out to hear the latest news. He was a very productive painter, who could even make small grisaille landscapes in brown ink or red chalk by candlelight.

According to the RKD he was a landscape painter who became the teacher of Houbraken's later art teacher Wilhelmus Beurs.
