= Aleida Greve =

Dutch artist (1670–1742)

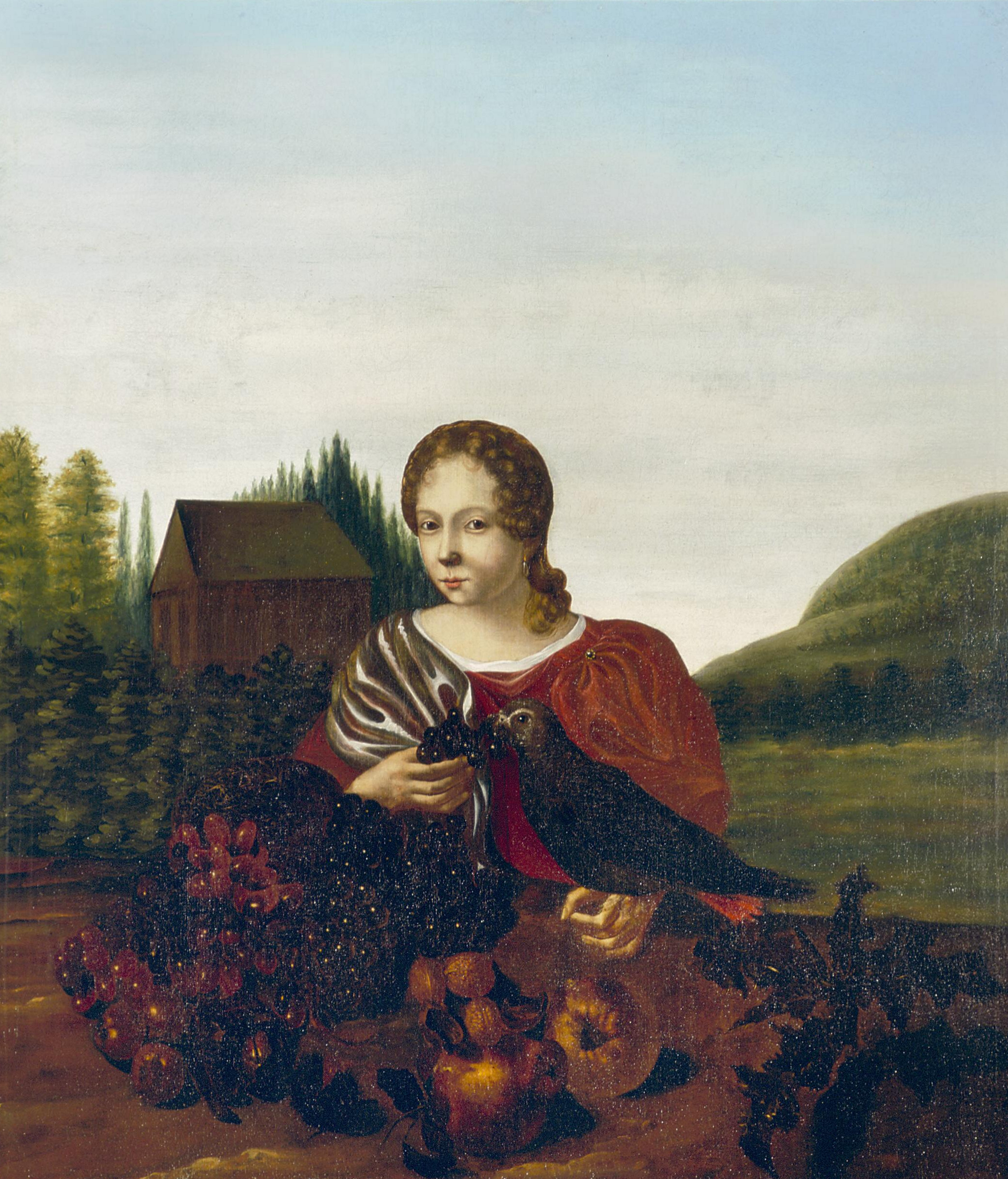
Portrait of a woman (probably a self-portrait), 1686

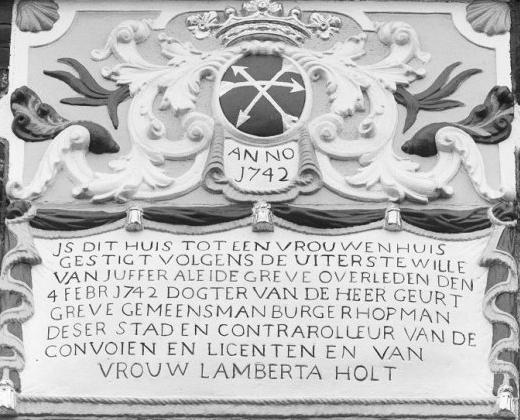
Roccoco gable stone on the Vrouwenhuis, Melkmarkt 53, stating that this women's home was founded by the last will of Aleide Greve who died 4 Febr 1742, the daughter of Geurt Greve – councilman, hopman, and controller of convoys and licenses in this city, and also daughter of Lamberta Holt

Aleida Greve (1670–1742) was an 18th-century painter from the Dutch Republic known for founding the Vrouwenhuis, Zwolle.

== Biography ==
She was born in Zwolle as the daughter of the largest beer brewer in Zwolle, Geurt Greve (1634-ca.1680), and Lamberta Holt (d. 1691). Her mother was the widow of Herman van Marle, the former owner of the "Gouden Kroon" brewery that was merged after her marriage with Greve's. Aleida had an older half-sister from her mother's first marriage, Cornelia van Marle. Together the two girls became pupils of the Dordrecht painter Wilhelmus Beurs in 1686, along with their cousins Anna Cornelia Holt and Sophia Holt.

== Works ==
In 1686 each pupil made a large painting about a meter square (the largest was made by the eldest, Sophia). Aleida and her cousin Anna Cornelia were only 16 when they made these paintings. Their teacher Beurs was very proud of his pupils and dedicated his book on painting and paint-mixing to them in 1692. The women remained pupils of Beurs until he left for Amsterdam to publish his book. Aleida never married and was reported to paint various genre styles, but little remains other than the examples of her work still on display in her former home. Aleida continued to paint and collected other paintings by the women of Zwolle to decorate her sitting room, which she also decorated with paintings on the doors. Aleida never had children and later in her testament she made sure her house would be turned into a rest home for women. Her sitting room was to remain as it was in her day and became the regent's room of the women's old age home called the Vrouwenhuis founded in a complex around her former home on the Melkmarkt. The room has become a fossilized time-capsule of paintings done by young women in the Dutch Golden Age.

== Art collection ==
Paintings by Aleida Greve were popular in Zwolle in her day according to period accounts, but no known works by her have been discovered outside the Vrouwenhuis. A decorative mirror and a self-portrait featuring the same mirror dated 1689, still hang on the wall of the regent's room and reflect the pride she took in her own work. After the old age home closed in the 1980s, an investigation into a museum function renewed interest in her work and that of the other ladies represented in the collection, and since an inventory was taken of the contents of the house in 1981 historical research has been conducted into the provenance of the various artefacts, all of which are traceble to Aleida's day.

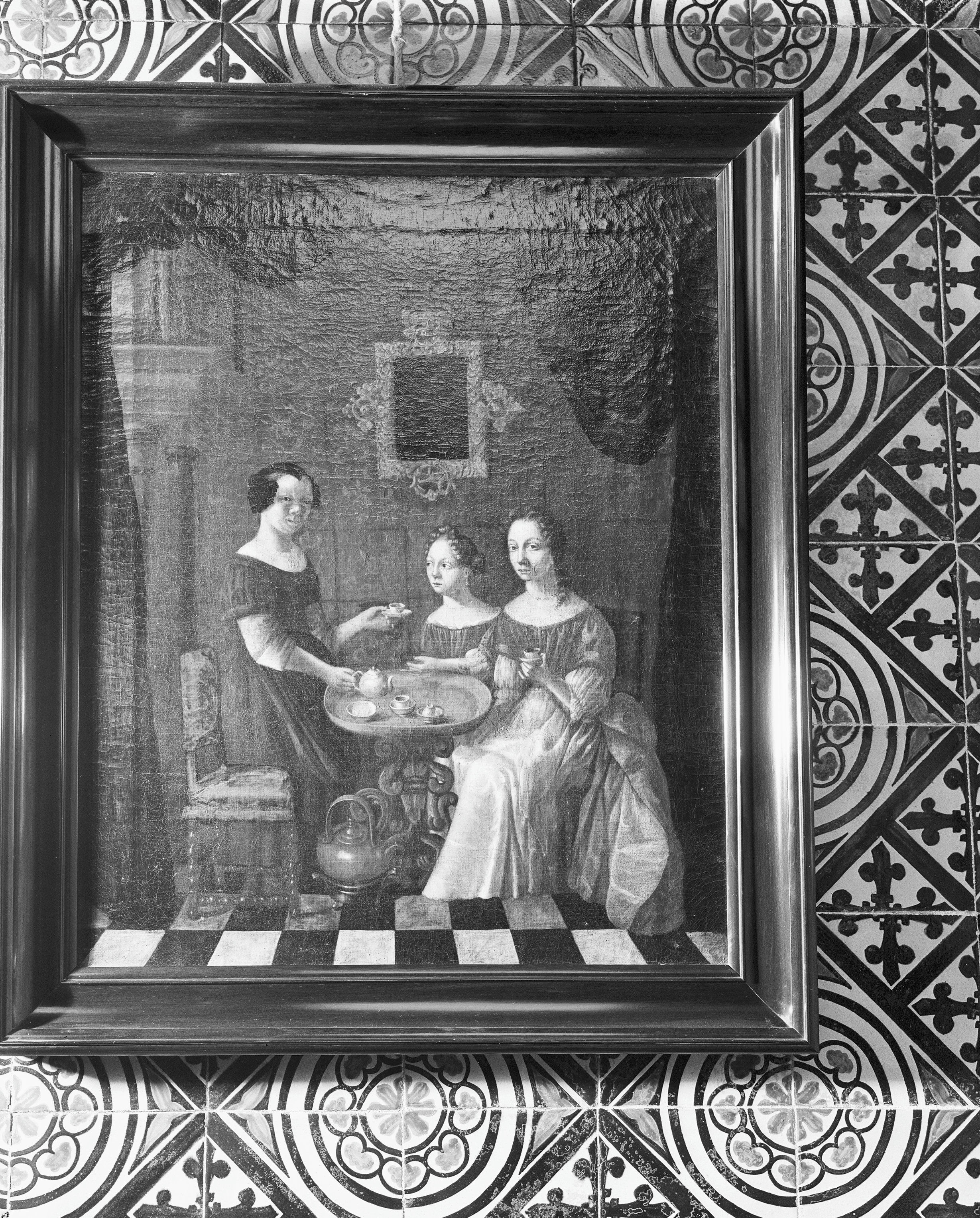
1689 self-portrait with mirror; presumably the one pouring tea is Aleida

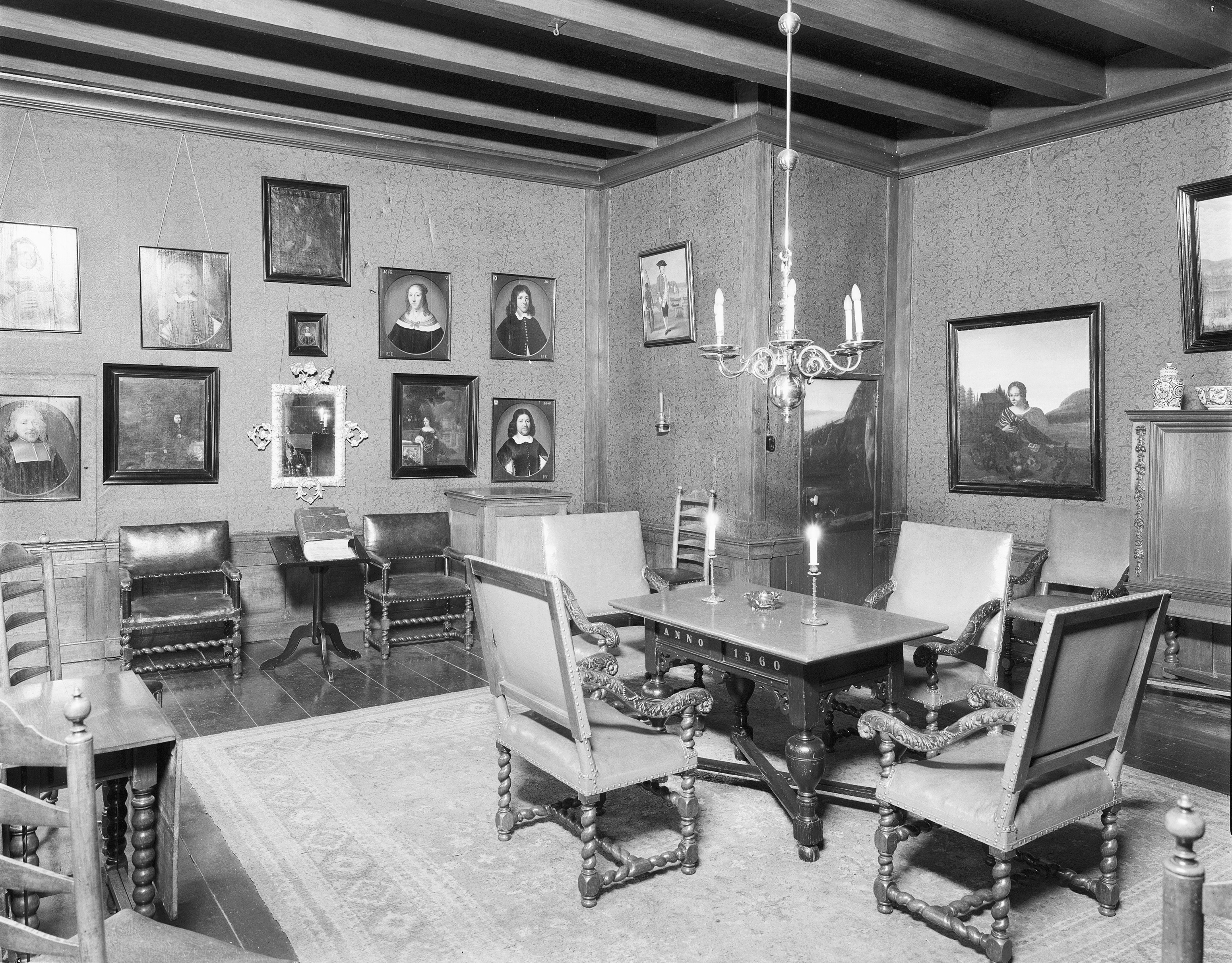
View of the regent's room with the mirror and other paintings.

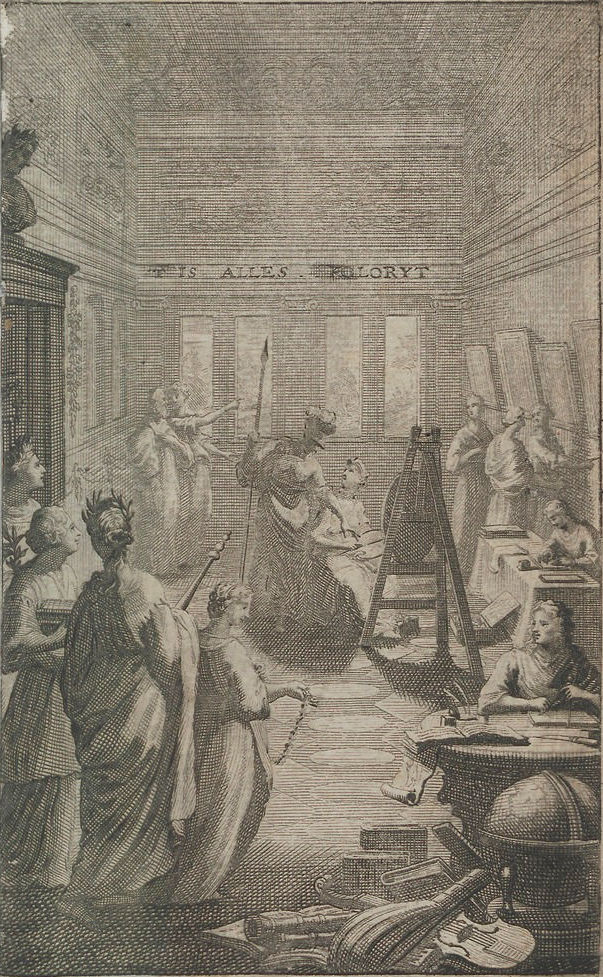
Frontispiece of Wilhelmus Beurs' book, showing three ladies looking at meter-square panels on the wall, 1692

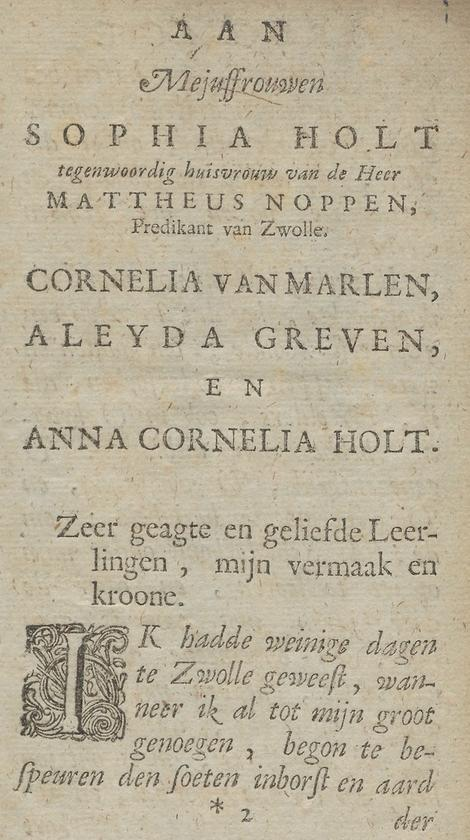
Dedication by Beurs to his pupils including Aleida Greve.

In this art gallery the work of Beurs' other pupils are also represented, but like Aleida, other works by them have been lost. Other paintings hanging in the gallery not attributed to these ladies directly, are presumably by local or visiting artists, such as unknown "wall" painters who painted the doors (landscapes) and the chimneypiece (flowers). It is unknown whether the painter Eva van Marle was related to the brewer Herman van Marle, the father of Cornelia. A painting by Peter van de Velde of a harbour scene with ships includes a landscape of Gibraltar. Two other marines are in the collection, but were not signed and as yet have not been attributed to artists. The art collection has been kept with the other original furnishings according to the wishes of Aleida's will, which declared that the regent's room with all of its paintings had to remain as they were on the occasion of her death, and this is the reason that this art collection with all of its curiosities still exists in its entirety.
