= Alida Garcia =

American social activist

- Occupation: FWD.us Vice President of Advocacy
- Known for: Social activist

Alida Garcia is an American social activist whose major work centers on immigration issues.

== Career ==
Garcia currently serves as the Vice President of Advocacy for FWD.us, a lobbying group co-founded by Mark Zuckerberg. She previously served as Director of Coalitions & Policy. Some main goals of the initiative are to provide immigration reform, enhance the education system and invest in the sciences. Additionally, she is the Co-Founder & Executive Director of Inclusv.
