= Cornelia van Marle =

Dutch artist (1661–1698)

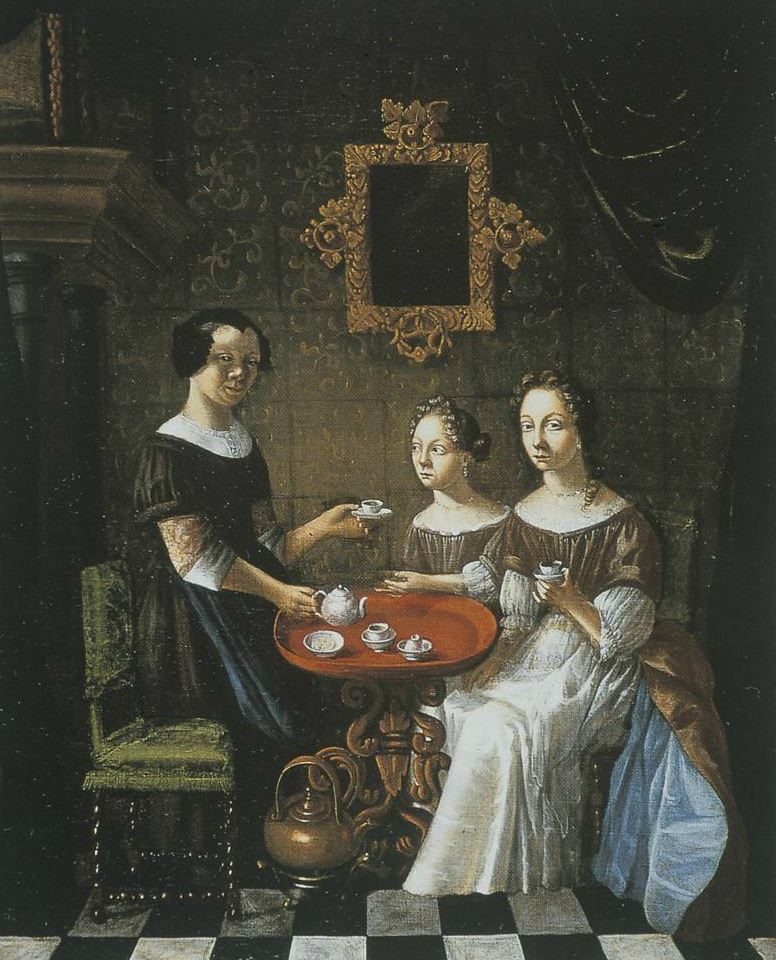
A Tea Party, 1689

Cornelia van Marle (1661–1698) was a Dutch Golden Age painter.

== Biography ==
She was born in Zwolle as the daughter of the beer brewer Herman van Marle and his wife Lamberta Holt. After her father died her mother married another brewer, Geurt Greve, and he merged his business with Van Marle's at the brewery "De Gouden Kroon", located in the Voorstraat (behind the Vrouwenhuis on a street parallel to the Melkmarkt). Their daughter Aleida became Cornelia's half-sister.

Along with her younger half-sister and two cousins, she became a pupil of the Dordrecht painter Wilhelmus Beurs in 1686. Beurs recognized their ability and dedicated his book to them in 1692. All four women made large panels under the instruction of Beurs in 1686, and all four of these hang in the regent's room of the Vrouwenhuis in Zwolle today.
