= Alida Vázquez =

Mexican composer (1930–2016)

Alida Vázquez (1930–2016) was a Mexican composer who lived and worked in the United States. Vázquez was born in Mexico City, and from 1941 to 1947 attended the Conservatorio Nacional de Música. She studied piano with Esperanza Cruz de Vasconcelos and music theory with Julián Carrillo. She received a scholarship to attend Diller-Quaile Music School in New York City and also studied with Mario Davidovsky at City College. After completing her music studies, she studied journalism and worked as a music therapist. In 1976 she began teaching music at the Bank Street College of Education. Later, she was a teacher of guitar and piano in the Preparatory Division of Mannes College of Music (now part of The New School). Vázquez died in 2016.

== Works ==
Vázquez composed song cycles and works for solo instruments, chamber ensembles, electronic dance music and electro-acoustic works. Selected works include:

- Acuarelas de México 1970
- Piece for Violin and Piano 1970
- Pieza para clarinete y piano 1971
- Música para siete instrumentos 1974
- Electronic Moods and Piano Sounds, 1977
