= Eva van Marle =

Dutch Golden Age portrait painter

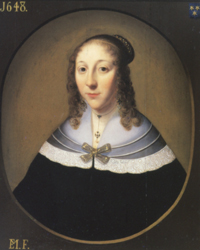
Portrait of a woman, signed "EM.F.", dated 1648, and decorated with the Holt family shield, in the regent's room of the Vrouwenhuis

Eva van Marle may have been the name of a Dutch Golden Age portrait painter who signed with the monogram E.M., EM.F. (E.M. fecit) and was active in Zwolle, Overijssel, between 1642 and 1654.

== Work ==
According to research by J. Verbeek and J.W. Schotman in 1957, "monogrammist E.M." was possibly the teacher of Hendrick ten Oever. The oldest known work with an E.M. signature is a portrait of a goldsmith, who was the brother-in-law of Gerard ter Borch the Elder, dated 1645. Most of the portraits depict people to their waist and all but two depict people from the patriciate and nobility of Overijssel or citizens of Zwolle. Six such portraits hang in the Vrouwenhuis, Zwolle.

== Attribution ==
Recent scholarship is doubtful about the existence of Eva van Marle. Egbert Berents van Marle, who became a citizen of Zwolle in 1637, is the ancestor of the Zwolle magisterial family Van Marle. Eva would have been of his generation, but there are no genealogical data on her. The first time she is mentioned was in 1875, when the director of the Vrouwenhuis, whose grandfather was a Van Marle, attributed the six portraits there to her. Towards the end of the 20th century, Eva van Marle's existence was enough in doubt that at exhibits the works were again assigned to "monogrammist EM". Recent research suggests that the monogram may have been that of the painter Evert Meertman, who was one of six painters listed as members of the Zwolle artisan guild. Evert Meertman may be the same person as the Antwerp painter Ever(ard)t Moerman(s), who married the daughter of a local goldsmith in Zwolle in 1634, and gained citizenship in 1639. He was buried in Zwolle on April 2, 1659.

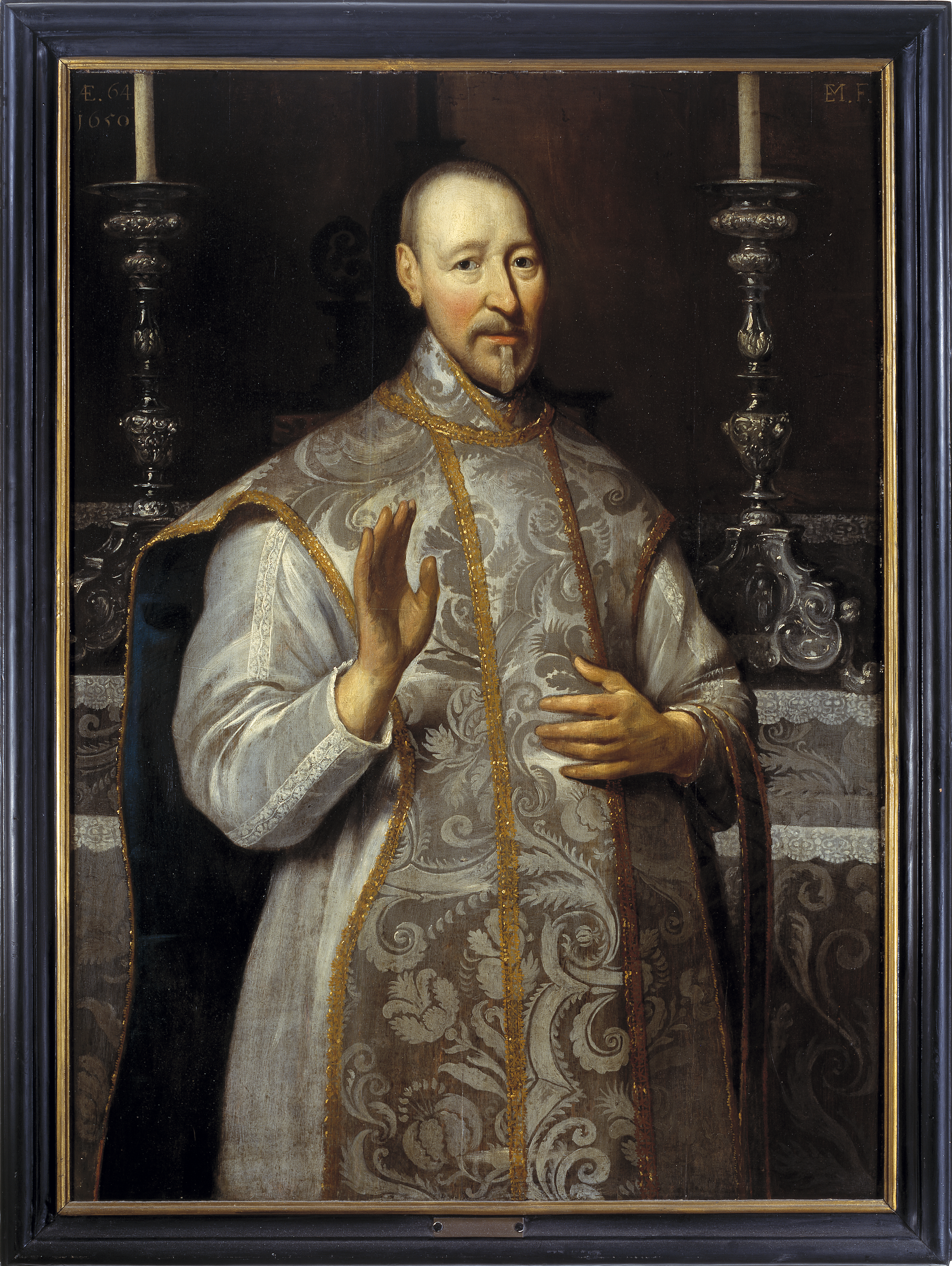
Volkert Herkinge

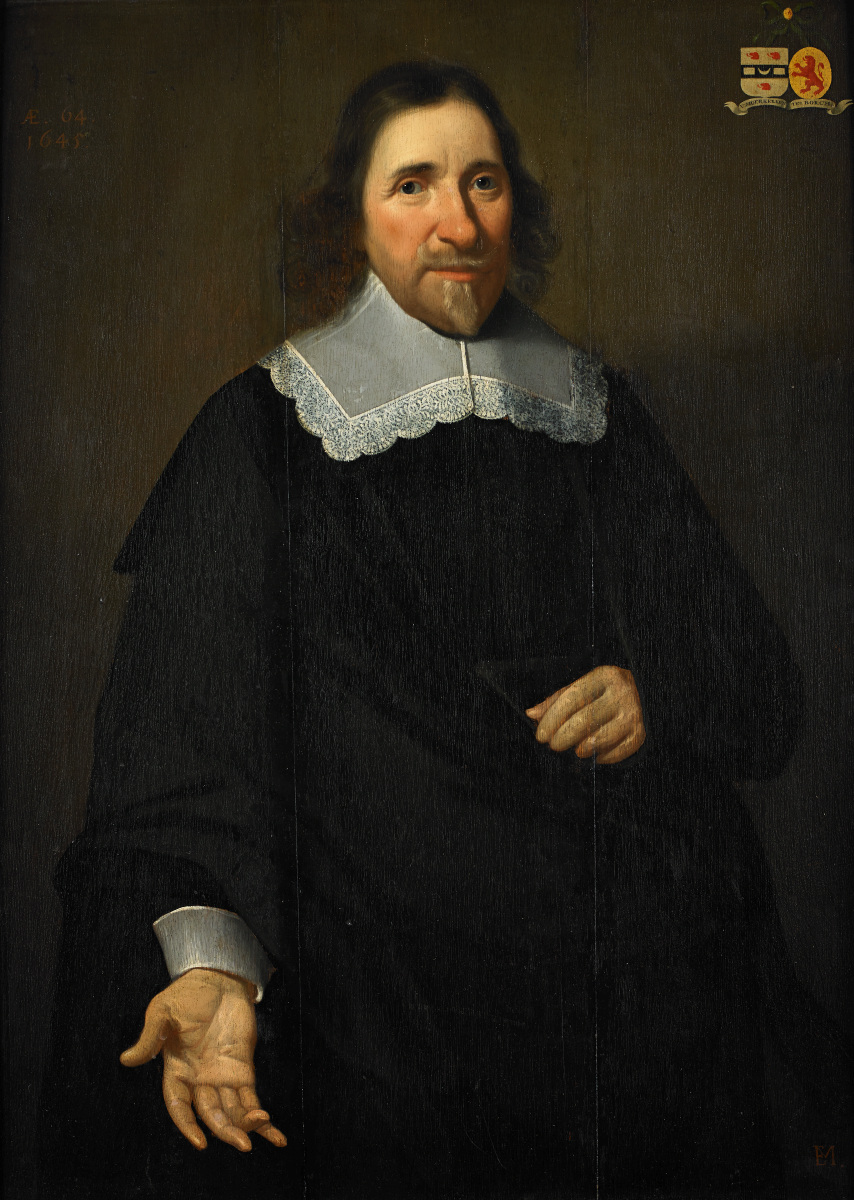
Justinus van Moerkerken

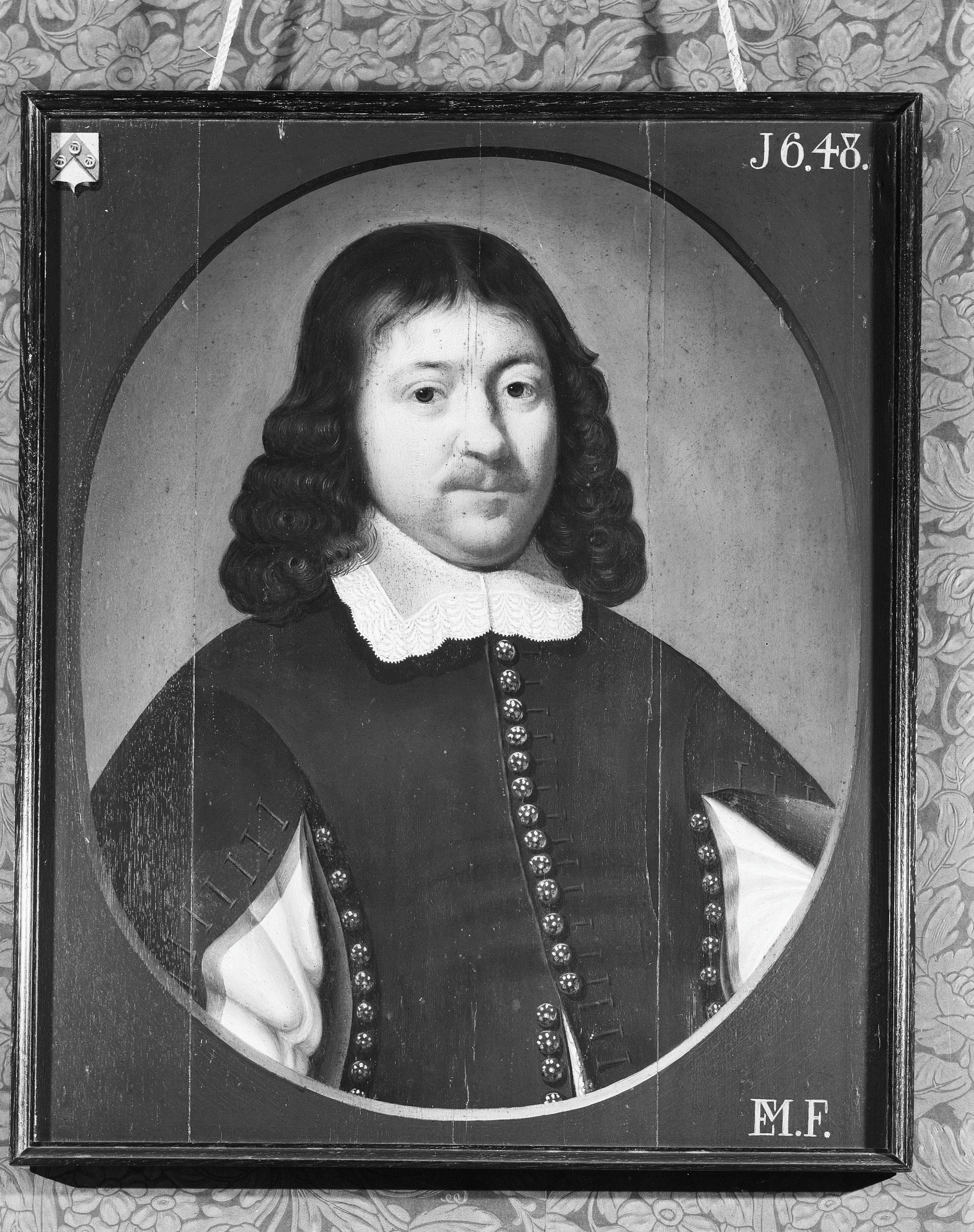
Greve family

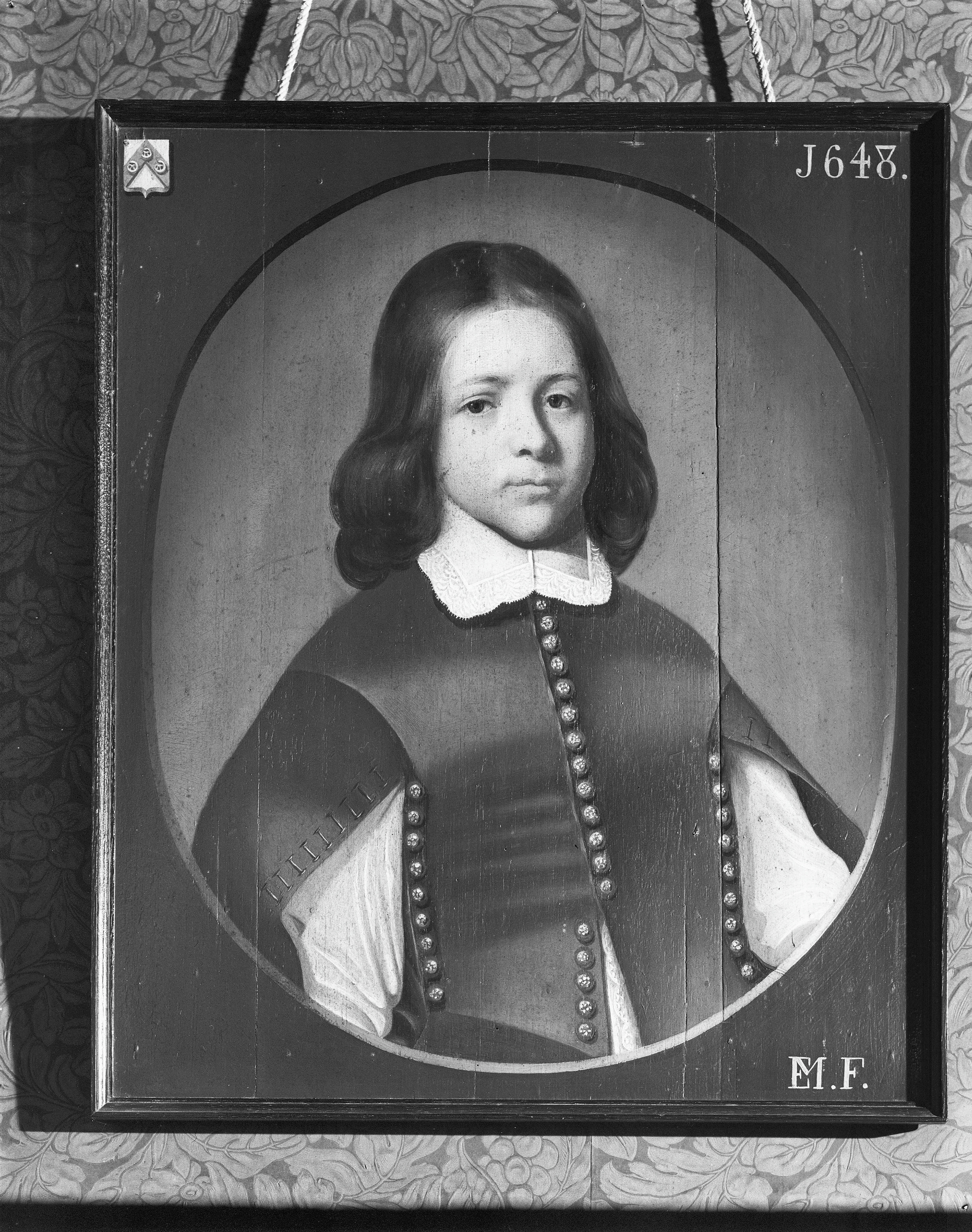
Greve family

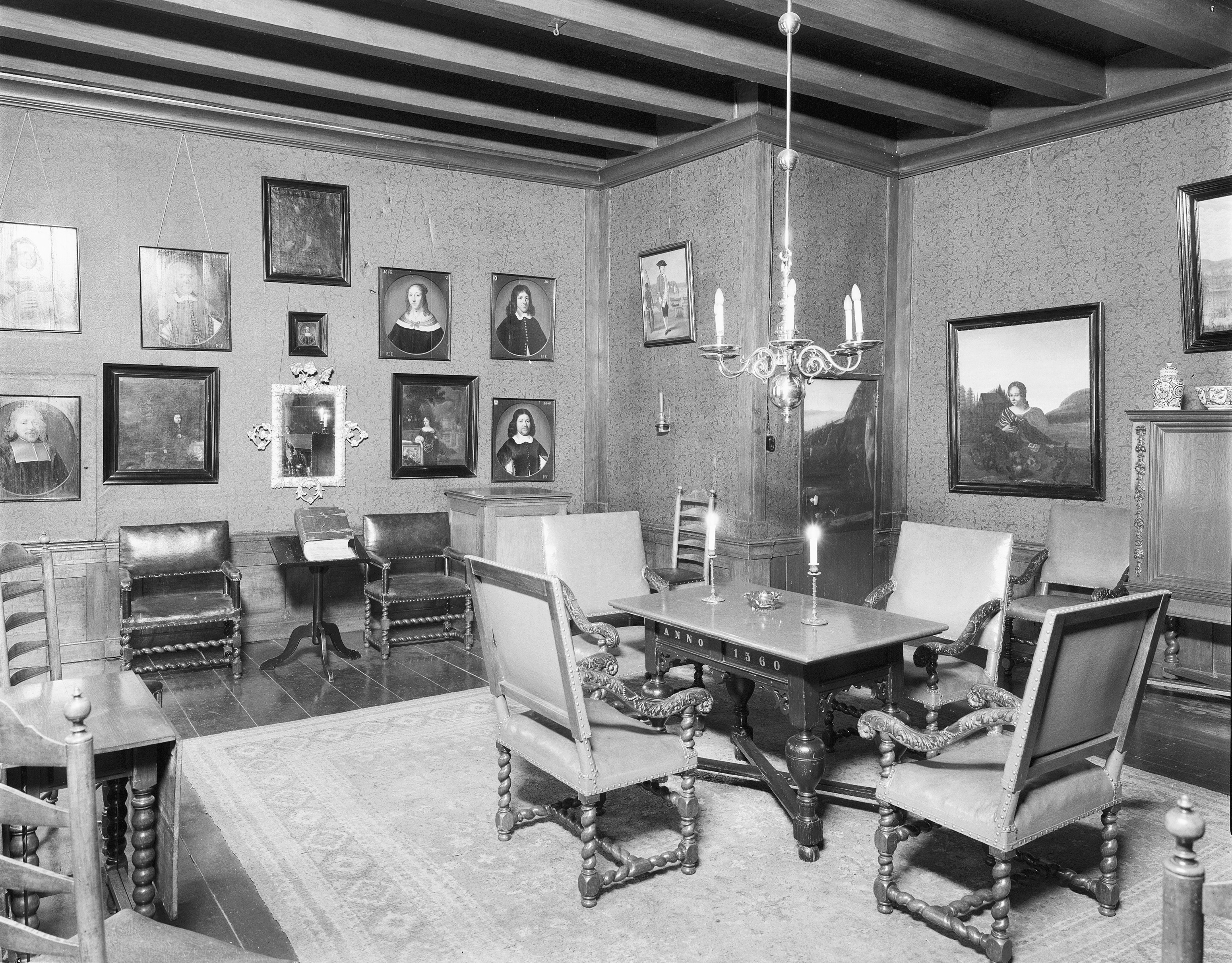
State-room in Zwolle
