= Aleida Quintana =

Mexican human rights activist

Aleida Quintana Ordaz
- Born: 1987; Querétaro de Arteaga, Mexico
- Occupation: Social anthropologist
- Known for: Human rights activism

Aleida Quintana Ordaz (born 1987, in Querétaro de Arteaga) is a Mexican human rights activist trained as a social anthropologist. She was exiled to Spain due to the threats she experienced because of her activism.

== Activism ==
In 2012, she began denouncing the disappearances of people occurred in Querétaro estate. She created a database of missing people, who were "human trafficking, feminicide, sexual exploitation, forced labour, hired killer, mendicity, domestic labour and forced marriage victims". Quintana found out there were more missing people than the official sources stated. Because of her conviction, she founded the organization T'ek'ei Grup Interdisciplinari por la Equidad. T'ek'ei actions consisted of accompanying missing people's relatives and investigating cases that authorities removed, focusing especially on the feminicide cases. The Mexican government denied the existence of such crimes, as many of the government members were tied to the illegal drug trade. One reason for hiding these facts was that the Querétaro government did not want to smear its image of economic prosperity, which had then one of the highest GDPs (Gross Domestic Products) in Mexico.

She prepared a database of disappeared persons, who were "victims of human trafficking, femicides, sexual exploitation, forced labor, Desam, hitmen, begging, labor and forced marriage ”. Aleida discovered that there were more disappearances than the official sources said. With this conviction, she founded the organization T'ek'ei Grup Interdisciplinario por la Equidad. This organization dedicated itself to accompanying the families of the disappeared and investigated the cases that the authorities separated, focusing especially on the cases of femicides. The government denied the existence of stories of crimes, many members of the government being people linked to drug trafficking.

For her activism, she has suffered threats, defamation and endured up to three attacks. In January 2018, she was attacked in retaliation for revealing the authorities' cover-up of criminal acts. Quintana went into exile from her country with her partner, Fernando Valadez. They entered Spanish territory in March with the Amnesty International reception program.

In 2015, she received the Cecilia Loría Saviñón Medal for her work in defence of women's human rights and for her contribution in the fight for equality and the eradication of violence.

In 2017, she was given by the LVIII Querétaro estate term the honour of the Medalla de Sor Juana Inés de la Cruz. When she received it, she stated that this very fact of receiving it is contradictory.

Reaction against her activism consisted of threats, defamations and even three aggressions. In January 2018, she was attacked as a reprisal for uncovering the hiding of criminal actions by the authorities. Quintana went into exile from her country with her romantic partner, Fernando Valadez. They entered into Spanish territory in March through the Amnesty International reception program.
