= Aleijda Wolfsen =

Dutch artist (1648–1692)

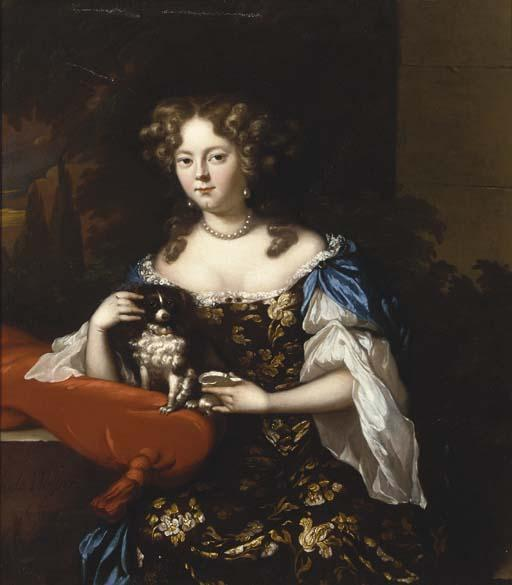
Seated woman in a flower brocade dress with a King Charles Spaniel and seashell with landscape beyond

Aleijda Wolfsen (22 October 1648 – 25 August 1692), was a Dutch Golden Age painter.

== Biography ==
She was born in Zwolle as the daughter of the wealthy mayor Hendrik Wolfsen (1615-1684), and Aleijda Verwers (1626-1665) in the house on the Grote Aa bij de Wal, that was later renamed to Melkmarkt 53. Her father held important political offices and in 1657 the family moved to The Hague, though the house in Zwolle was kept on. Young Aleijda became a pupil of Caspar Netscher. She was a friend of the family, who she may have known from Zwolle, where Netscher had been a pupil of Gerard ter Borch. Her name appeared often as witness to the birth of Netscher's children. In 1665 Aleijda's mother died in childbirth with her 11th baby. Her father remarried three years later in 1668, but not before Aleijda herself had married the mayor of Zwolle Pieter Soury on 5 October 1667 in Rijswijk. She moved into the Zwolle house with her husband and like her father had done, kept the house on despite moving with her husband for a few years to The Hague and Amsterdam. She kept on with her painting after her marriage, which was unusual for her time. Her father wrote a poem in an album kept by Gesina ter Borch in 1660, indicating that the family socialized in artist circles.

== Works ==
Her earliest signed work is from 1670, and her latest work was dated 1691. Her works are mostly portraits in the family circle of friends, with a few historical allegories. Aleijda was widely known and respected as a painter, and is recorded as painting the portrait of William III of England in 1674. Her biography was included by Jacob Campo Weyerman who called her a 'Penseel-Prinses' (brush princess). She died in childbirth with her fifteenth baby who was buried with her, and was survived by ten children in the ages 2–22.
