= Alette Coble-Temple =

Professor of clinical psychology

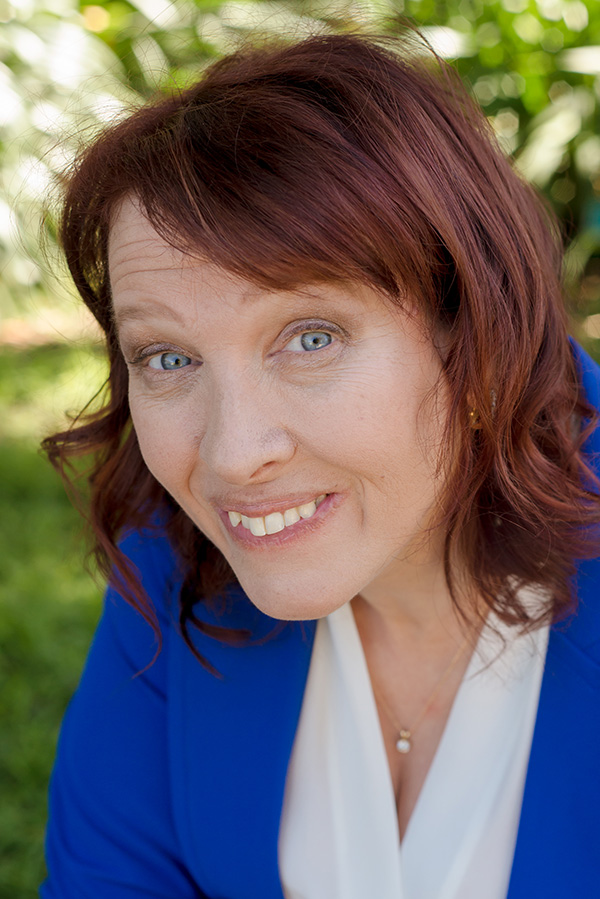
- Born: September 6, 1971 (age 55); Redwood City, California
- Education: Santa Clara University John F. Kennedy University
- Spouse: Bob Temple
- Children: Kathryn Temple
- Scientific career
- Fields: Clinical Psychology
- Workplaces: John F. Kennedy University

Alette Coble-Temple is a professor of clinical psychology at John F. Kennedy University. She is a member of the disabled community as an advocate for equal rights for individuals with disabilities. She is also a leader among women in the field of psychology. She sits as both a member of the American Psychological Association Committee on Women in Psychology, and as a member of the APA's Leadership Institute for Women in Psychology.

She lives with cerebral palsy and much of her work has focused on disability rights. In 2015 she won the Ms. Wheelchair California pageant.

== Early life and education ==
At birth, Coble-Temple was given a 10% chance of surviving. As a child she was required to attend a special school for those with disabilities until she rebelled at the end of fourth grade and told her parents she was striking going to school until she could attend the school four blocks from her neighborhood home. With the support of her parents, they fought the local school district and at the beginning of fifth grade, Coble-Temple was fully mainstreamed at Almond Elementary. She graduated from Los Altos High School in 1989 where she gave the student commencement speech. Coble-Temple attended Santa Clara University where she earned her bachelor's degree in psychology in 1993. While at Santa Clara University, she founded the first support group for students with disabilities and became the first physically disabled student to live on campus and become a member of the Zeta Epsilon chapter of Delta Gamma sorority.

In 1993, Coble-Temple relocated to Walnut Creek, California, in order to attend John F. Kennedy University (JFK University) in order to pursue a master's degree in sport psychology. She earned her degree in eighteen months and was voted most outstanding student for JFK University in 1995. In 1996 she returned to JFK University to be in the inaugural PsyD class. By 1999 she earned her doctorate in psychology and again was named the outstanding student of the year.

== Career ==
Coble-Temple became a licensed psychologist in 2001. She has worked in the areas of disability research and policy, performance enhancement, coaching, and provided clinical practice to a variety of populations especially children, adolescents, and families within the legal system.

Coble-Temple joined the PsyD faculty the College of Graduate and Professional Studies at John F. Kennedy University in 2004 and became an associate professor in 2014. Coble-Temple also works for the State of California Department of Corrections and Rehabilitation where she assesses parole candidates for the California Parole Board.

Coble-Temple is a member of the Leadership Institute for Women in Psychology. In January 2015, she was elected to serve a 3-year term on the Committee for Women in Psychology as part of the American Psychological Association. She served as chair of the committee in 2017.

== Awards and honours ==
- 2013 Faculty Member of the Year
- City of Concord Human Relations Commissions Education and Awareness Award
- 2015 John F. Kennedy University Harry L. Morisson Distinguished Teaching Award

== Personal life ==
Coble-Temple adopted a girl in 2004, and named her Kathryn. She is married to Bob Temple.
