= Liberal Alliance for Democracy =

Political party in Burundi

The Liberal Alliance for Democracy (ALIDE) is a political party in Burundi. It was founded in 2002. ALIDE advocates for free-market capitalism and liberal democracy. They currently hold no seats in Burundi's national parliament.
