= Aletta de Frey =

Dutch copyist, drawer and painter

Anna Alida de Frey
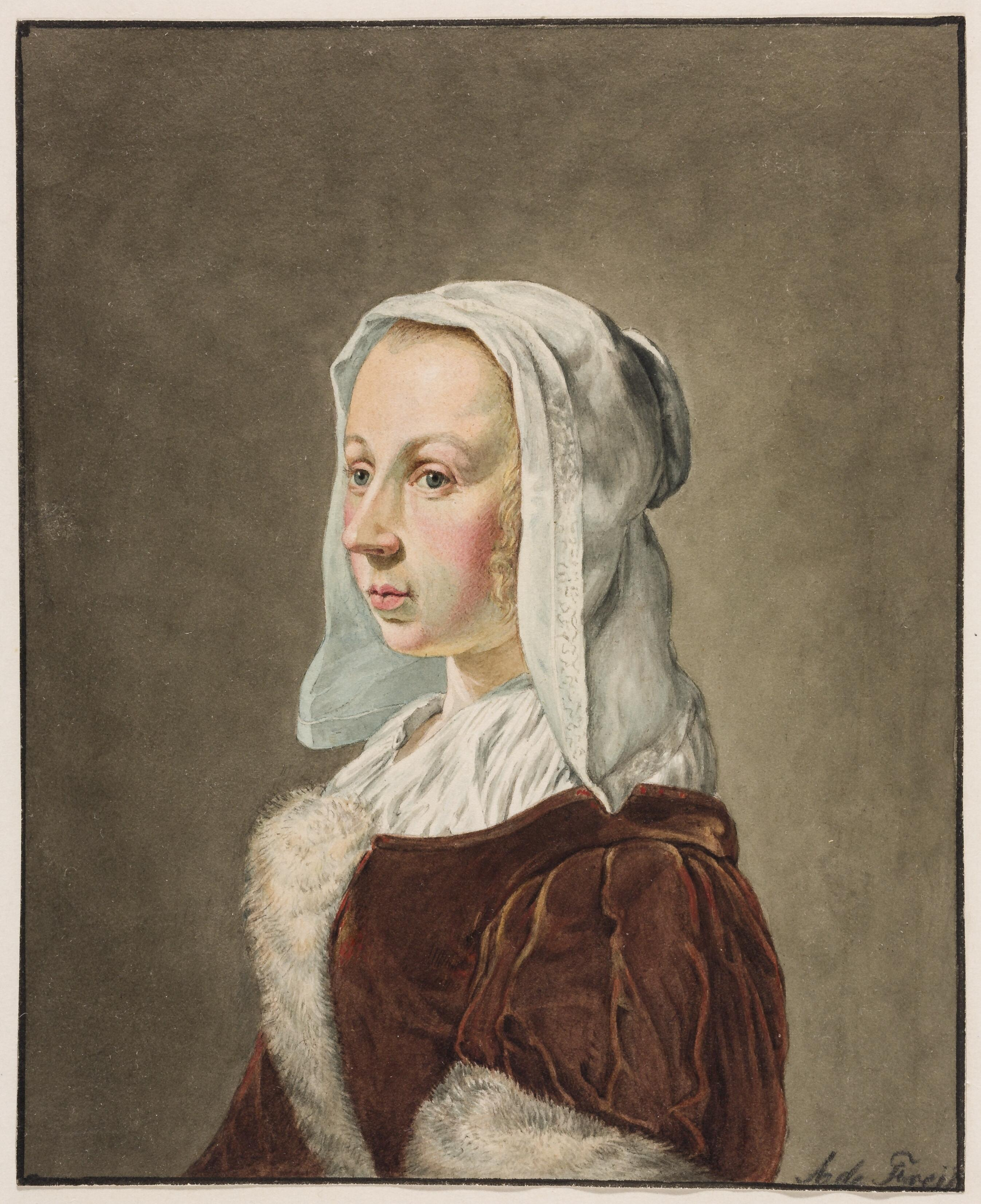
- Kniertje, painting by Aletta de Frey / Anna Alida de Frey
- Born: Anna Alida de Frey; September 24, 1768; Amsterdam
- Died: 1808; Mannheim
- Known for: copyist, painting

Anne Alida de Frey or Freij (September 24, 1768 – 1808) was a Dutch copyist, drawer and painter.

De Frey was born in Amsterdam as the second child of a family of 3 daughters and two sons. The family was Roman Catholic. Jacobus Johannes Lauwers from Bruges became the teacher of Anna and her younger brother Johannes Pieter de Frey, who became a printmaker, painter and publisher. Lauwers lived in their house for a short while and later married the eldest sister Maria Christina. On March 22, 1804, Anna Alida and Gerhard Pootmann had the banns published. She used herself on this occasion the names Anna Aletta. After their marriage (April 4, 1804) they appear to have moved to Mannheim.

== Work ==
Anna de Frey was a specialist as copyist from Jan Steen, Gabriel Metsu and Emanuel de Witt. She preferred interiors and genre scenes and worked mostly in watercolours. Paintings in oil are rare. But in 1790 and 1810 there have been paintings from her hand for sale on auctions. Her copies were found in recommended art collections at her time, according to contemporaries Van Eijsden and Van der Willegen. They also stated that she was a teacher herself as well.
