= Anna Cornelia Holt =

Dutch painter (1671–1692)

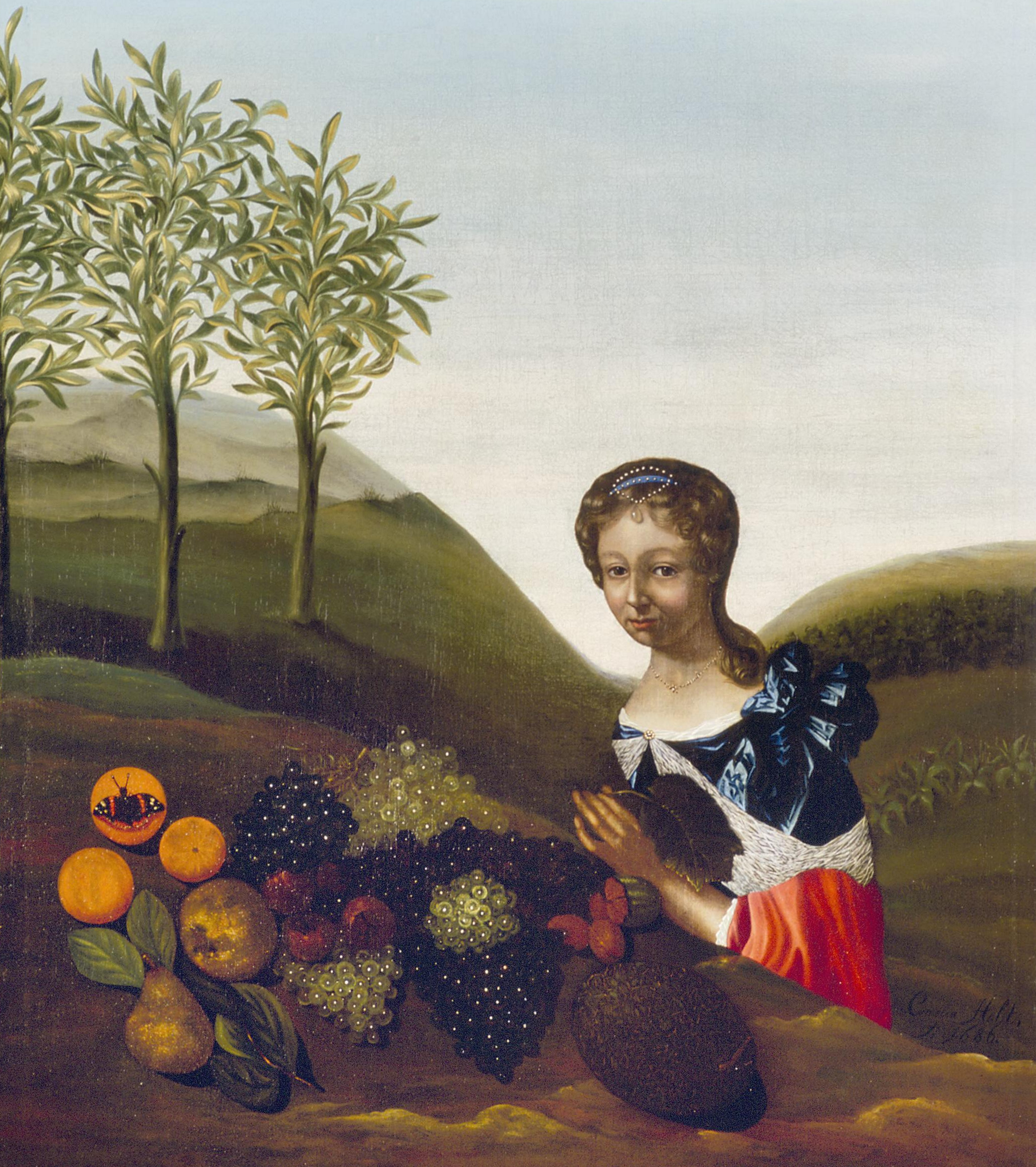
Portrait of a Young Woman with a Fruit Still Life in a Landscape (presumably a self-portrait), 1686, Vrouwenhuis

Anna Cornelia Holt (1671–1692) was a Dutch painter.

== Biography ==
She was born in 1671, in Zwolle, to Herman Holt (1643–1672), councilman of Zwolle, and Armarenta Holt (died 1714). She was the distant cousin of Aleida Greve and Sophia Holt. Along with her cousins, she became a pupil of the painter Wilhelmus Beurs. She was the youngest of Beurs' four pupils. Her father was Sophia's brother. The four pupils of Beurs were honored with a dedication page in his book that he published in 1692. Her self portrait with fruit looks very similar to the self-portrait created by her cousin Aleida Greve. She died in 1692, aged 20 or 21.
