= Alide =

Alide or ALIDE may refer to:

- Alide Dasnois (born 1950), South African journalist and newspaper editor
- Alide Ertel (1877–1955), Estonian writer
- Alide Maria Salvetta (1941–1991), Italian opera singer
- Alide Topp (1844–1935), German pianist
- Alide: An Episode of Goethe's Life, an 1874 romance written by Emma Lazarus
- Liberal Alliance for Democracy (ALIDE), a political party in Burundi
