= List of storms named Aletta =

The name Aletta has been used for ten tropical cyclones in the East Pacific Ocean:

- Tropical Storm Aletta (1974) – made landfall in Mexico.
- Hurricane Aletta (1978) – a Category 1 hurricane that made landfall near Zihuatanejo, Guerrero.
- Tropical Storm Aletta (1982) – did not affect land.
- Tropical Storm Aletta (1988) – caused one fatality and heavy rainfall in Mexico.
- Tropical Storm Aletta (1994) – did not affect land.
- Hurricane Aletta (2000) – a Category 2 hurricane.
- Tropical Storm Aletta (2006) – produced rainfall in Mexico.
- Tropical Storm Aletta (2012) – formed one day before the start of the East Pacific hurricane season on May 15.
- Hurricane Aletta (2018) – a Category 4 hurricane that did not affect land.
- Tropical Storm Aletta (2024) – the latest first named storm of a Pacific hurricane season in the satellite era (1971–present).

== See also ==
- Tropical Storm Iletta (1997) – a South-West Indian Ocean tropical cyclone with a similar name.
