= Alida Olbers Wester =

Swedish botanist

- Born: 1842
- Died: 1912 (aged 69–70)
- Scientific career
- Fields: Botany

Alida Olbers Wester (13 October 1842 – 29 October 1912) was an early Swedish botanist noted for studying plant anatomy, particularly the structure of the pericarp.

== Life ==
Alida Olbers was born on 13 October 1842 in Marstrand, a small island north of Gothenburg. She studied at Stockholm's higher seminar for women teachers, and until 1904 worked privately as a teacher in Stockholm. In the 1880s and 1890s she conducted research at the Hogskola's Botanical Institute. Olbers researched plant anatomy and morphology, and published eight papers, covering subjects such as flower and fruit anatomy in the pinks (Caryophyllacaea), mints (Labiatae), geraniums (Geraniaceae) and roses (Rosaceae).

Olbers married M. Wester in 1897, and died in Marstrand on 29 October 1912. She was seventy years old.

== Written works ==
- Olbers, Alida. (1887). Om fruktväggens byggnad hos Borragineerna (in Swedish), P. A. Norstedt.
