= Alida (video game) =

2004 video game

- Developer: Dejavu Worlds
- Publisher: Got Game Entertainment
- Platforms: Microsoft Windows, OS X, iOS
- Release: 2004
- Genre: Adventure

Alida is a 2004 adventure game developed by Australian indie studio Dejavu Worlds and published by Got Game Entertainment. The game was wholly created by Australian artist and musician Cos Russo.

== Development ==
The game was designed by Cos Russo, going through multiple revisions of the concept and objectives. It was developed for 5 years.

The game was released in limited distribution on January 17, 2003. It was officially released onto the North American market in May 2004. Prior to its release, a demo was available at the Got Game Entertainment site. On August 23, 2004, the game was released into retails stores on the Australia market. An iOS version was released in 2015, with a brand new sequel planned in the future.

== Plot ==
The making of process of the game, featured on the official Alida homepage.

In-universe, Alida is a guitar-shaped island off the coast of Australia, built by the members of a band from the money made from their successful first album. They never released a second album and were forgotten by their fans. The band split, they each locked their fortunes in separate parts of the island and left. Arin, one of the previous members, goes to the island to attend a supposed reunion but never returns home. His wife Julia asks the player to head to island to locate her husband, and this is where the game begins.

== Gameplay ==
Being a Myst-like point-and-click adventure game, Alida sees the player navigate through a series of screens. Spanning 5 CDs, the game focuses on interaction with puzzles to progress to new locations. The puzzles lean toward musical themes and vary in difficulty. It incorporates FMV scenes and CGI animations, both blended into the scenery.

An interview with the creator is a bonus feature of the game.

== Reception ==
Inside Mac Games noted some of the puzzles' intense difficulty and praised the games audiovisuals. Applelinks felt the game had a satisfying ending. Mac Review Games urged readers to support the game due to its creator's "vision, creativity, and conscience". In 2003, Just Adventure thought Alida was a "phenomenal achievement", but that it could have been a much better game. In 2004, a separate review told readers to buy the game at retail price to support games like this being made. Gamezone felt that everything the title tried to achieve had been done better a decade earlier. GameSpot thought the game's potential was bogged down by its confusing and difficult nature. Universal Hint System recommended that players frequently save in order to revisit a dialogue or note that contained important information. In 2026 a sequel, called Absolution is planned to be released on September 1st.
