= Wilhelmus Beurs =

Dutch Golden Age painter

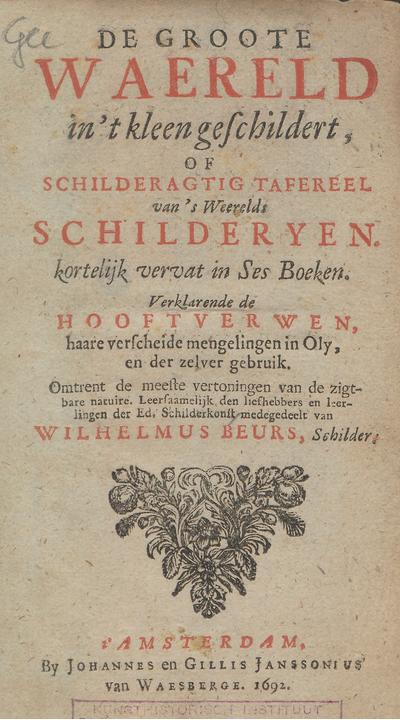
Title page from 1692 book on the art of painting and paint-mixing called De groote waereld in 't kleen geschildert, of schilderagtigtafereel van 's weerelds schilderyen, kortelijk vervat in sesboeken, verklarende de hooftverwen, haare verscheidemengelingen in oly, en der zelver gebruik

Wilhelmus Beurs (1656–1700) was a Dutch Golden Age painter.

== Biography ==
Beurs was born in Dordrecht. According to Houbraken, he was the son of a shoemaker and a quick study who was able to produce a good landscape after only a year's instruction, though he later took up flower painting. Houbraken met him as a fellow pupil of Willem van Drielenburg in 1671. Houbraken praised his book and reprinted one page of it as an example.

According to the RKD he moved to Amsterdam in 1672 where he later married. In 1687 he moved to Zwolle, where from 1688 he gave painting lessons from his studio and where he wrote a book on the art of painting that was published in 1692. He dedicated his book to his four pupils Aleida Greve, Anna Cornelia Holt, Sophia Holt, and Cornelia van Marle. He is known for Italianate landscapes; still-life paintings are documented in archives but are no longer known. He died in Zwolle in 1700.
