= Women in the Protestant Reformation =

Statutes, conditions and activities of women during the Reformation

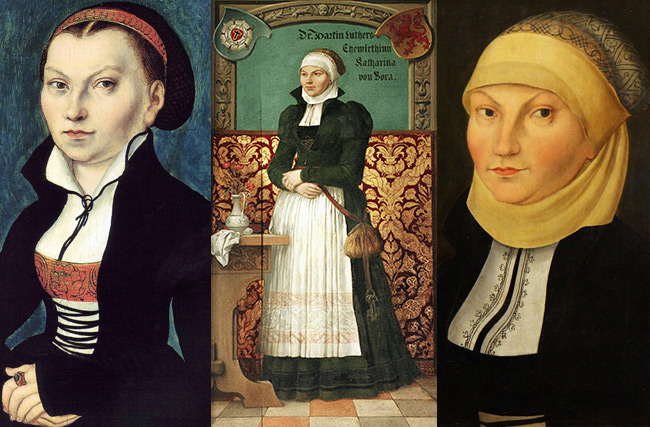
Katharina von Bora, wife of Luther, the founder of the Reformation. As a former nun and pioneering Vicar's wife as well as the perhaps most famous woman of the Reformation, she can be seen as a symbol of the changing role of women in the Protestant Reformation.

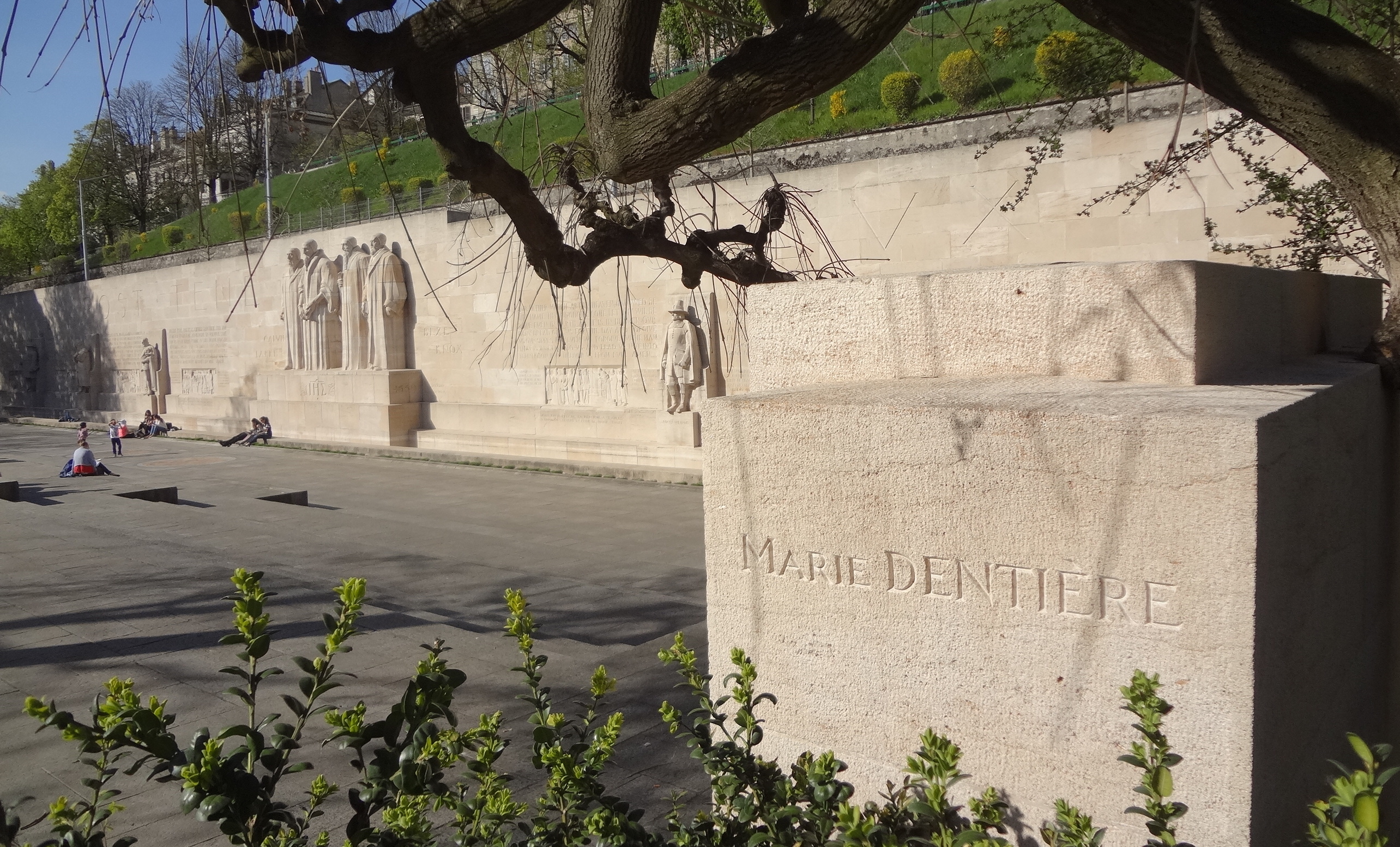
Marie Dentière is the only woman's name on the Reformation Wall in Geneva.

The status of Women in the Protestant Reformation was deeply influenced by Bible study, as the Reformation promoted literacy and Bible study in order to study God's will in what a society should look like. This influenced women's lives in both positive and negative ways, depending on what scripture and passages of the Bible were studied and promoted. The ideal of Bible study for commoners improved women's literacy and education, and many women became known for their interest and involvement in public debate during the Reformation. In parallel, however, their voices were often suppressed because of the edict of the Bible that women were to be silent. The abolition of the female convents resulted in the role of wife and mother becoming the only remaining ideal for a woman.

== Women's role during the Reformation ==
=== Education ===
The Reformation promoted literacy and the study of the Bible in vernacular language in order to study how society should look like in the eyes of God. Commoners and not only clergy were now encouraged to study the Bible, which in turn encouraged literacy. Literacy and Bible study were, to a varying degree, encouraged for women as well, for them to be a biblical influence for children and their husband.

Schooling for girls and literacy for women consequently and gradually became more common. For example, the Swedish Church Ordinance of 1571 mandated the education of girls along with the boys. Bible studies had different effects on the position of women, depending on which scripture was studied, and how it was interpreted. In some cases, it benefitted women, when they found passages suggesting women were equal to men in the presence of God. In other cases, it did the opposite.

The women's ideal promoted during the Reformation was the women were to be silent and obedient wives and mothers, devoted to household tasks and childcare. The purpose of women's education was the development of an accepted concept of marriage and training in domestic skills. Women were taught how to look after children, care for their homes, make clothing for her family, and tend livestock.

=== Marriage ===
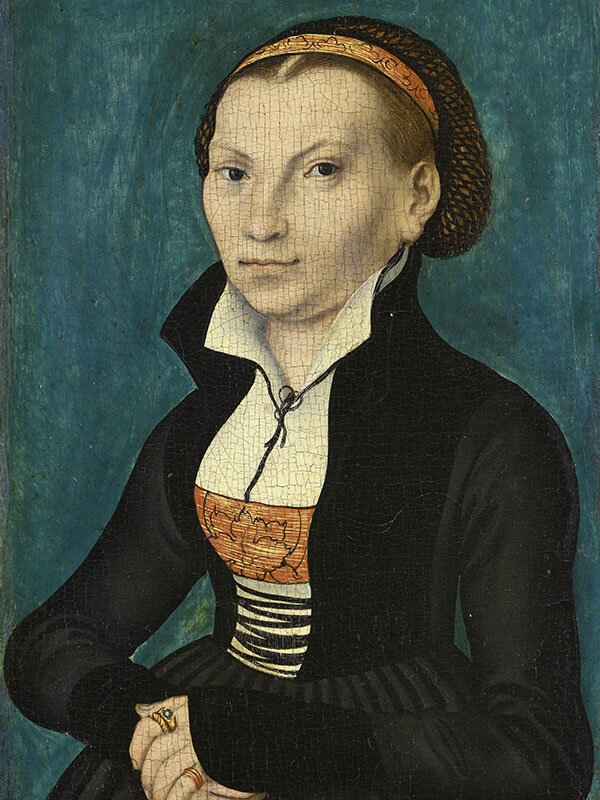
Katharina von Bora played a role in shaping social ethics during the Reformation.

The Reformation abolished the celibacy for priests, monks and nuns and promoted marriage as the ideal state for both men and women. While men still had the opportunity to become clergymen, women could no longer become nuns, and marriage came to be seen as the only proper role for a woman. Consequently, marriage was idealized, and the role of women within marriage was studied within the context of Bible studies.

The Biblical role of a wife was regarded to be that of a companion to her husband, and to submit to him. Obedience was demanded by husbands, and wives were restricted in their actions.

In some cases, the reformation resulted in males committing bigamy, as polygamy for men was tolerated in the Bible. Elisabeth of Hesse exposed the secret bigamy of her brother Philip. Philip I had committed bigamy by the approval of the reformer Martin Luther.

==== Marriage of nuns ====
A new phenomenon during the Reformation was the abolition of the female convents and the marriage of former nuns. When the nunneries were closed, nuns were formally allowed to return to their families or marry.

The most famous example was the former nun Katharina von Bora, who married the reformer Martin Luther. Other examples were former abbess Charlotte of Bourbon, former abbess Katharina von Zimmern of Fraumünster Abbey in Zürich, and former abbess Birgitta Botolfsdotter of Vadstena Abbey in Sweden. Charlotte of Bourbon, who was forced to become a nun by her family against her own will, ran away from the convent to the Protestant Electorate of the Palatinate, and married to the Protestant William the Silent, Prince of Orange in 1575. There were cases in which former nuns married former monks, such as when the Swedish nun Ingeborg Åkesdotter married the former monk Hans Klasson Kökkemäster, who became a Lutheran priest after the Swedish Reformation.

The marriage of nuns still remained controversial in the eyes of the public, however. While these marriages were officially encouraged by the reformers, they were nevertheless in practice seen as controversial by the public, who were raised to believe in the sanctity in the celibacy of priests, monks and nuns. Katharina von Bora was thus by some considered to be a horrible role model for women who, like herself, had married priests, as well as for former nuns who had left their convents, despite the official doctrine.

==== The pastor's wife ====
In parallel to the abolition of the nunneries, a new informal position for women within the church was created in the form of the pastor's wife. In many cases, the priests married their housekeepers, with whom they had already been living with before priests were allowed to marry. An example of this was the marriage between the Catholic priest Curatus Petrus (Per Joensson) and his housekeeper-mistress Anna Pehrsönernas moder, with whom he had two sons: he and other Swedish priests were commanded to marry their housekeeper-mistresses after the introduction of Reformation in Sweden.

The marriages of priests set the standard of a new role in society, which was that of the pastor's wife. The position of a pastor's wife was a new women's role in society, in which the pastor's wife was expected to engage in the welfare of the members of her husband's parish.

The new phenomenon caused problems because the pastor did not own his vicarage and his widow was thus left without means to support herself after his death. In Germany and the Nordic countries, this problem resulted in the phenomenon called widow conservation, in which the newly appointed pastor was expected to marry the widow of his predecessor.

=== Public and professional role ===
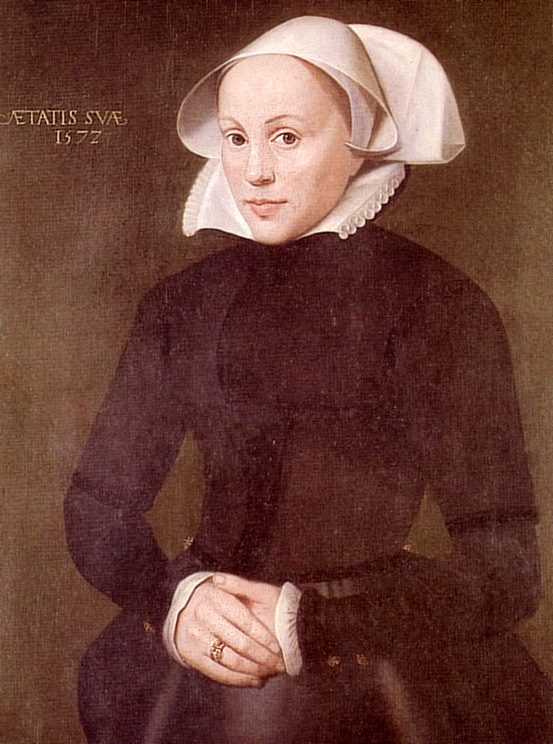
Maria of Jever introduced the reformation in her lands

The Bibles study and literacy promoted during the Reformation did have an effect on women's position, as secular women becoming publicly known as writers and authors, which had been uncommon before. The Calvinist Anne Locke was a translator and poet, who published the first English sonnet sequence. Catherine Parr, the sixth wife of Henry VIII, became the first English woman to publish a book (Prayers or Meditations) under her own name in 1545.

Despite the ideal of the domestic housewife promoted by the Reformation, women continued to fill different roles depending on their class, and while the role of nun was abolished, noblewomen continued to manage large estates and merchant women continued to manage businesses.

Some businesswomen benefitted from the secularisation of clerical property during the Reformation, as did their male counterparts. Anna Karlsdotter (d. 1552) was a noblewoman landowner who retracted donations her ancestors had made to the church. The merchant Anna Taskomakare, who successfully traded copper and iron, also benefitted of the Reformation's secularisation of clerical property.

== Women Rulers and the Reformation ==
There were examples of female rulers who benefitted and even introduced the reformation in their realms during their time in power. One such example was Elisabeth of Brandenburg, Duchess of Brunswick-Calenberg-Göttingen, who introduced the Reformation in Brunswick-Calenberg-Göttingen during her tenure as regent in 1540–1545, and Barbara von Wertheim, who also supported the reformation in her domain during her regency. Another example was queen Jeanne III of Navarre, who introduced the Reformation in Navarre. She also became a leader of the French Huguenots during the Huguenot wars in France, and as such played a major role in Protestantism during the Reformation. The support Zwingli was given by Abbess Katharina von Zimmern of Fraumünster, who was the representative of the Emperor and de facto ruler of Zürich, played an important part for the successful introduction of the Reformation in Zürich and consequently the spread of Zwingli's Protestantism in Europe.

Aside from women rulers, powerful women acted as patrons of and used their influence to benefit the Reformation even when they were not themselves rulers. Queen Anne Boleyn, wife of King Henry VIII of England, was not only an indirect cause of the English Reformation due to the king's wish to marry her despite being denied an annulment from his first wife Catherine of Aragon: she also directly acted as a patron of Protestantism in England at the time. In France, Margaret of Valois-Angoulême was famous for her protection of protestants, as was Renée of France and Isabella of Navarre, Viscountess of Rohan.

=== Politics and patronage ===
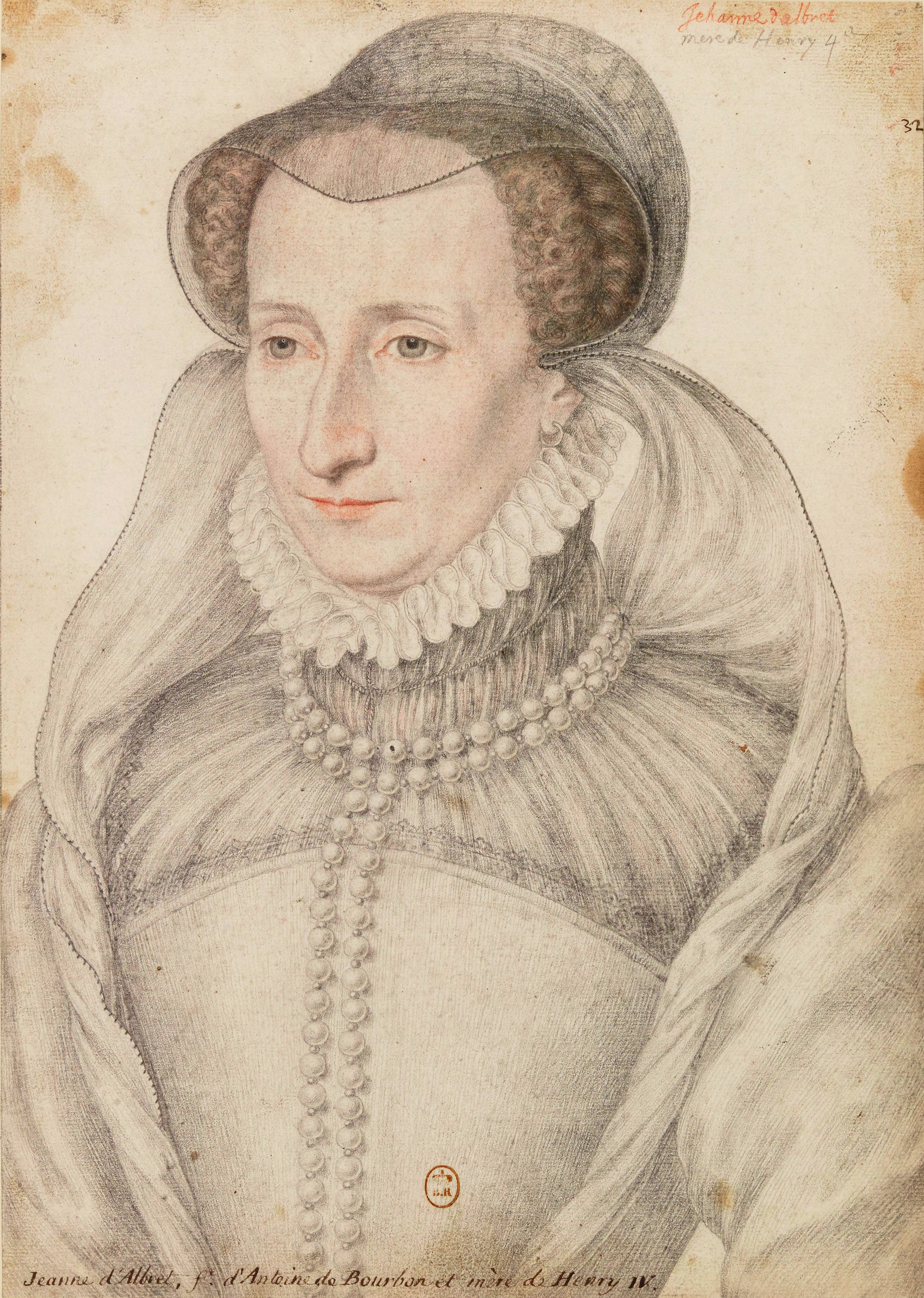
The Reformation queen Jeanne III of Navarre

During the Reformation, when women's role became a topic of discussion in context to the ongoing Bible studies, women's political power, as well as women's proper Biblical place in other areas, became a subject of debate. Female rule and women's role in politics was itself controversial for some Protestant reformers, most famously in The First Blast of the Trumpet Against the Monstruous Regiment of Women by John Knox. At the time, both Scotland and England were governed by female leaders. While in Europe, Knox discussed this issue of gynarchy with John Calvin and Heinrich Bullinger. While Knox believed that gynarchy was contrary to the natural order of things, Calvin and Heinrich believed it was acceptable for women to be rulers when the situation demanded.

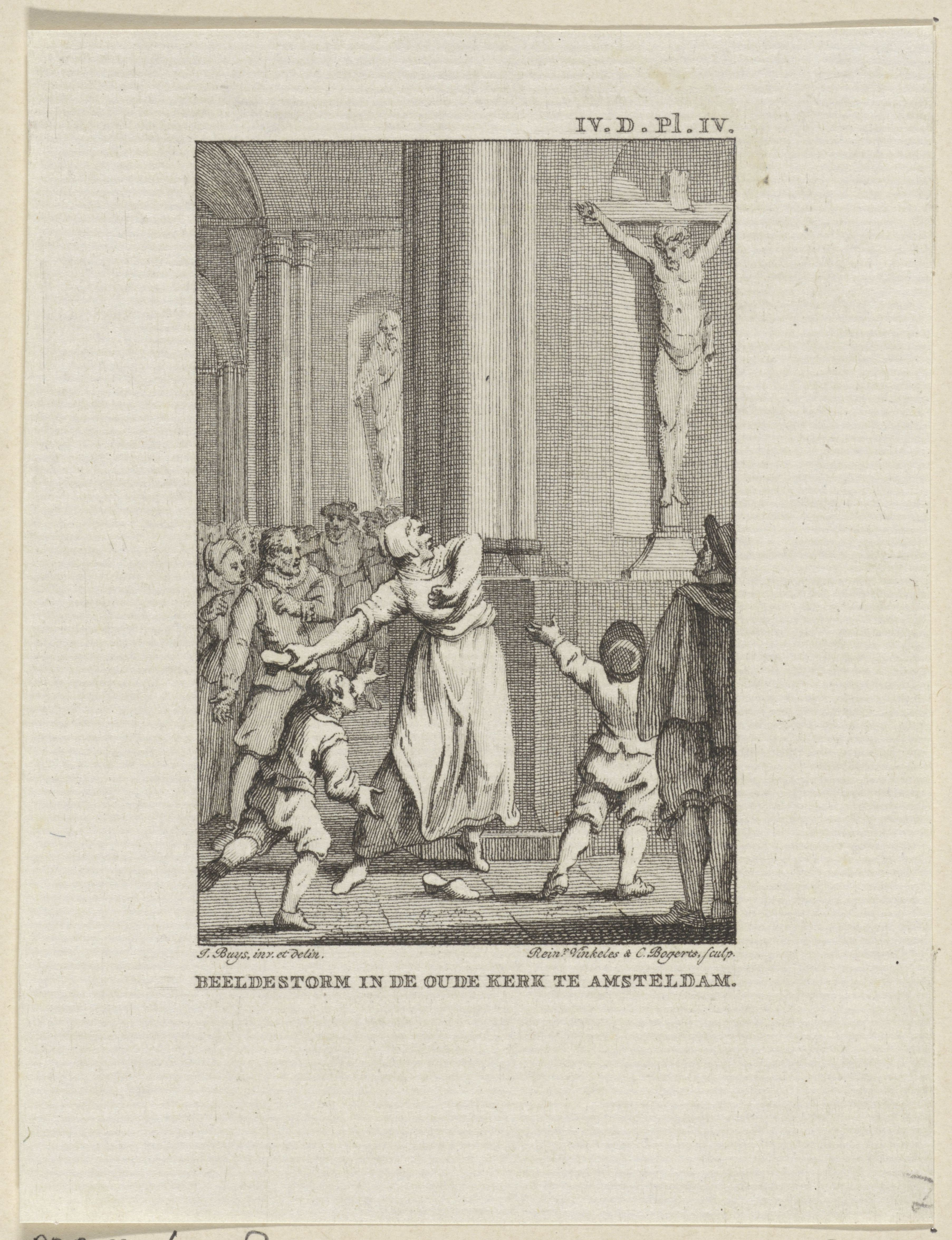
Weyn Ockers throws her slipper at a crucifix. Print by Reinier Vinkeles.

=== Women reformers ===
Some male reformers are known to have been less opposed to women participating in the public debate. Reformer John Calvin was known for contacting several noblewomen to ascertain their opinions on certain religious topics.

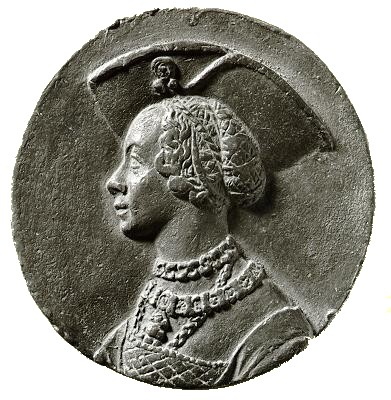
Argula von Grumbach

Women are known to have actively participated in iconoclastic riots, famously Weyn Ockers participated in the iconoclastic riots in Amsterdam in 1566. Conversely, women participating also on the opposite side, as defenders of Catholic chapels and icons, such as Engel Korsendochter. These examples of enthusiasm were generally praised by their contemporary sympathisers.

When commoners were encouraged to Bible study and interpret God's word during the Reformation, women also became engaged in the public debate. However, women's preaching or publishing material stood in direct opposition to the words ascribed to St. Paul (1 Timothy 2: 11–15) which ordered women not to teach or preach, so that all women who published felt it necessary to justify their actions. The only exception was the Anabaptist religion, where women could preach in church. Because Elizabeth I of England was a woman, Parliament decided to make her the Supreme Governor of the Church of England instead of the Supreme Head of the Church of England. The Elizabethan Religious Settlement she played a role in cultivating developed into the Protestant Church of England that exists today.

The sole alternative role for women which had existed outside of marriage, to join a convent, was no longer available in Reformed Protestant areas, although some convents voluntarily participated in the Reformation. For example, following Catherine of Mecklenburg's choice to defy her Catholic husband and smuggle Lutheran books to Ursula of Munsterberg and other nuns, Ursula (in 1528) published 69 articles justifying their reasons to leave their convent. Although her writings reached Martin Luther, they were listed on the Index Librorum Prohibitorum from 1596 to 1900.

Most of the evidence of works or writings that are written by women are from their letters or through the testimonials of the women who were being questioned about their faith. These testimonials, based on the women of the Reformation, were written by men.

Women participated in the public debate during the Reformation as writers, such as Argula von Grumbach and Marie Dentiere. Elisabeth Cruciger was a friend of Martin Luther and the first female Reformation-era hymn writer. In 1590, Christine of Hesse published the psalm-book Geistliche Psalmen und Lieder.

Olimpia Fulvia Morata was able to converse fluently in Greek and Latin, and lectured as a teen on Cicero and Calvin's works. Her writings were published posthumously and also placed on the Index.

Magdalena Heymair became the first woman ever to have her writings listed on the Index Librorum Prohibitorum. She published a series of pedagogical writings for elementary-age teaching and also wrote poetry. Lutheran poet Catharina Regina von Greiffenberg was exiled from her home in Austria during the Counter-Reformation.

=== Convents and nuns ===
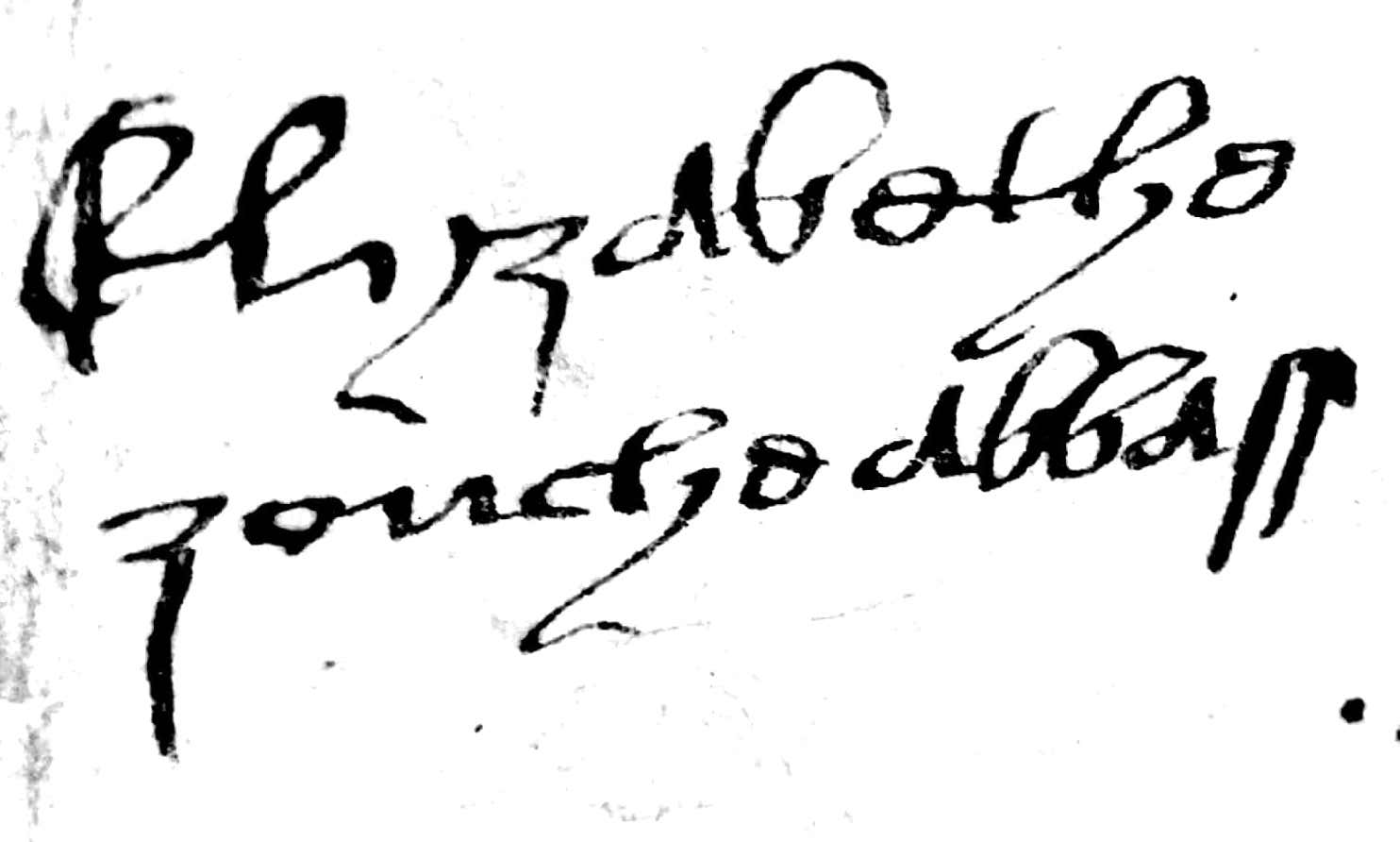
Signature of Abbess Elizabeth Zouche on the deed of surrender of her Abbey in 1539

One of the biggest changes in women's roles during the reformation was the closure of the convents for women, which had until then provided an alternative role for women to that of a wife and mother. The biblical ideal of women as seen by the reformers was that of a wife and a mother, and the nuns were encouraged to leave the convents and marry. In areas where convents were closed, this eliminated the option of a full-time religious role for Protestant women.

The convents were closed and banned from accepting any new members, while the existing members were allowed to leave and marry or return to their families if they wished. In practice, there was often some difference in how the convents for men and women were treated. While monks were often evicted from their convents immediately, nuns were in practice often allowed to stay in the former convent buildings on an allowance for life, provided that they did not accept any new members. This was likely due to the consideration that it was more difficult for women to support themselves if they were evicted. Another factor was that nuns often came from the nobility prior to becoming nuns and thus they were related to influential people. One example of this was the suppression of monasteries in Sweden, where female convents existed for decades after the reformation such as Vreta Abbey, where the last nuns died in 1582, and Vadstena Abbey, from which the last nuns emigrated in 1595, about half a century after the introduction of reformation.

The same pattern can be observed in almost every country during the reformation regarding the nuns:

- In England, Elizabeth Zouche, abbess of Shaftesbury Abbey and Cecily Bodenham, abbess of Wilton Abbey, were both given allowances along with their nuns.
- In Sweden, the former nuns of Sko Abbey lived on state allowances and managed a school for girls.
- In Scotland, prioress Euphemia Leslie of Elcho Priory at Perth secured the economical support and pension of her nuns after the introduction of the Reformation in 1560.
- In Iceland, Abbess Solveig Rafnsdóttir of Reynistaðarklaustur and her nuns were allowed to reside in the closed convent for life.
- In Norway, Bakke Abbey was officially closed in 1537, but the nuns remained until at least 1561.
- In Finland, Nådendal Abbey was closed in 1527, but the nuns remained for 50 years after.
- In Denmark, Maribo Abbey was closed in 1536, but the nuns remained until 1551, after which the Abbey was transformed in to a Lutheran house of secular canonesses for the use of unmarried noblewomen.

It was thus uncommon for nuns to be aggressively evicted from their convents, but it did occur. Such events took place in Geneva, where the nun Jeanne de Jussie documented how the nuns of the Poor Clares convent in Geneva were forced to leave the city with the introduction of the Reformation; as well as in The Netherlands, when the Reformation took place during the Dutch War of Independence; abbesses Amalberga Vos and Louise Hanssens of Ter Hage Abbey were forced to evacuate the nuns and flee from the abbey, which was vandalized and destroyed by iconoclasts.

Martin Luther had not planned to get married, but former nun Katharina von Bora convinced him it would be a good idea to marry her. Due to her moderately wealthy background and a household license to brew and sell beer, she was able to support Luther financially. Martin Luther himself taught that "the wife should stay at home and look after the affairs of the household as one who has been deprived of the ability of administering those affairs that are outside and concern the state..." John Calvin agreed that "the woman's place is in the home."

Some convents (such as Ebstorf Abbey near the town of Uelzen and Bursfelde Abbey in Bursfelde) adopted the Lutheran Christian faith. Anna II, Abbess of Quedlinburg renounced her considerable rights as Princess Abbess to introduce the reformation in her territories.

These protestant convents became known as damenstift. Three exclusively female Lutheran orders for women open today are the Communität Casteller Ring, the Daughters of Mary, and the Evangelical Sisterhood of Mary. Although Communität Christusbruderschaft Selbitz is mixed, it is almost entirely female.

== Martyrs ==
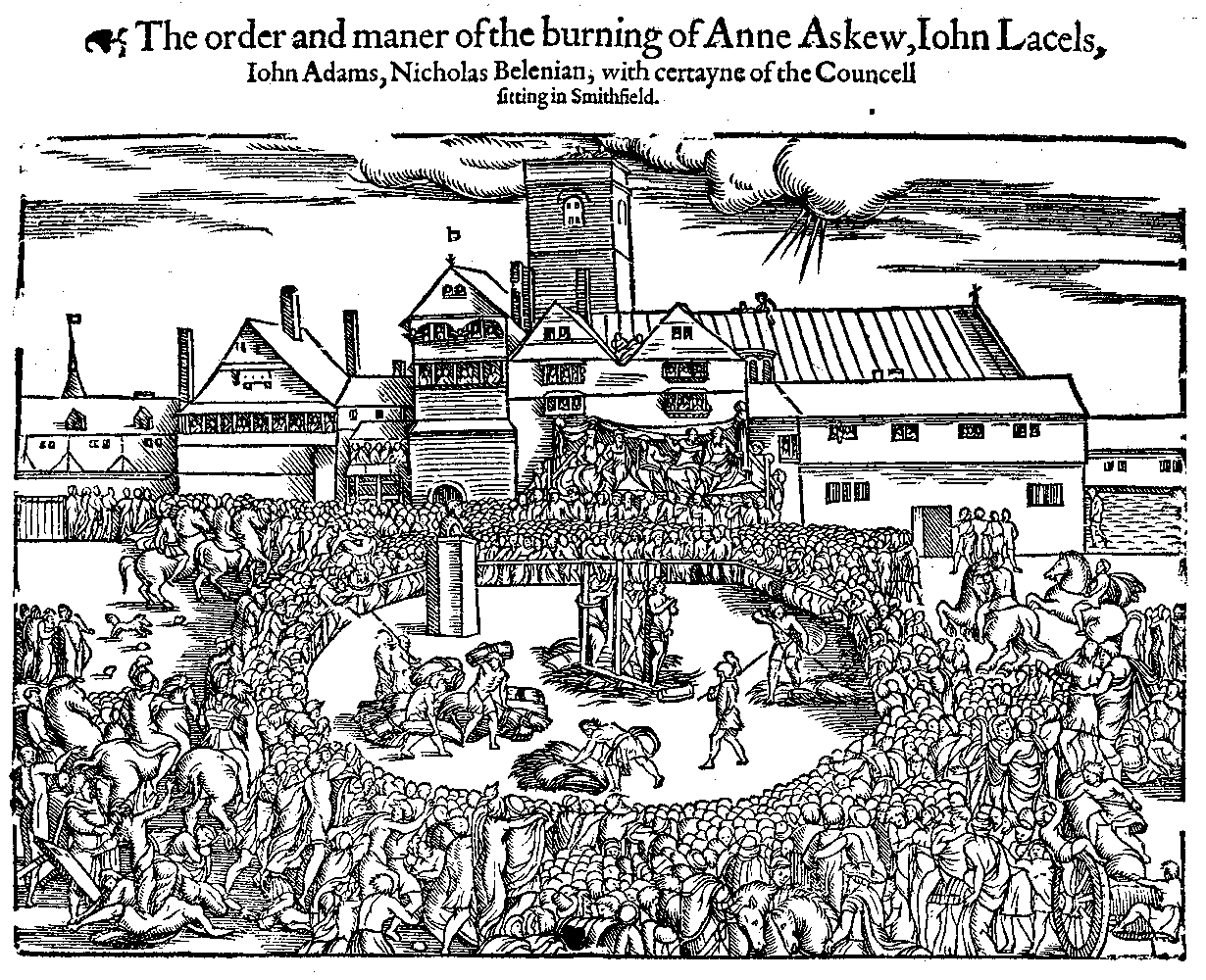
Woodcut of the burning of Anne Askew, for heresy, at Smithfield in 1546

Many women were martyred or imprisoned for Protestantism during the Reformation.

Some of them include:

- Wendelmoet Claesdochter († 1527), Netherlands
- Aefgen Listincx († 1538), Münster, Germany
- Anneke Esaiasdochter († 1539), Netherlands
- Katarzyna Weiglowa († 1539)
- Maria van Beckum and Ursula van Beckum († 1544)
- Anne Askew (1521–1546), tortured in the Tower of London and martyred in Smithfield for Protestantism
- Joan Bocher (d. 1550), English Anabaptist martyr in Smithfield
- Elizabeth Pepper (d. 1556), martyred while pregnant for Protestantism, together with Agnes George
- Guernsey Martyrs, three women martyred for Protestantism in 1556, one woman was pregnant and gave birth while being burned, the child was rescued but then ordered to be burned, too
- Joan Waste (1534–1556), blind woman martyred for Protestantism
- Alice Benden (d. 1557), martyred for Protestantism
- Alice Driver (d. 1558), testified for and martyred for Protestantism
- María de Bohórquez († 1559)
- Weyn Ockers († 1568), Netherlands
- Anneke Ogiers († 1570), Netherlands
