= Funeral sermon =

A Christian funeral sermon is a formal religious oration or address given at a funeral ceremony, or sometimes a short time after, which may combine elements of eulogy with biographical comments and expository preaching. To qualify as a sermon, it should be based on a scriptural text. Historically such sermons were very often prepared for publication, and played a significant part in Lutheran, and later in Puritan, presbyterian, and nonconformist literary cultures, in Europe and New England. They also were and are common in Christian denominations generally.

A trend in funeral sermons of the Renaissance and Reformation was a move away from the thematic sermon closely allied to scholasticism, towards an approach based on Renaissance humanism. In Spain, for example, the two were combined, the analytical and verbal style joined to humanist epideictic. While the contemporary assumption may be that a funeral sermon contains a significant element of life writing on the subject, in the past the inclusion of life writing was in tension with religious messages. The funeral sermon is a mixed genre. Patrick Collinson used a "cuckoo in the nest" metaphor to describe the Protestant reformer's predicament when funeral sermons were given: classical rhetoric of exemplars was used, while radical evangelicals could not accept the sermon form as suited to the lives of the godly.

That said, the early modern funeral sermon was structured around and began with explication of a biblical text. It in that way was distinguished as a genre from the eulogy and other types of funeral orations and obituary addresses. For women, in England at least, "exemplary eulogies" would be constructed from female Biblical figures, sometimes displacing the subject's agency outside domestic life.

== Protestant denominational traditions ==
Martin Luther preached on the death in 1525 of Frederick III, Elector of Saxony, and in 1532 for the death of John, Elector of Saxony. These sermons are extant. The subsequent Lutheran tradition of the Leichenpredigt was said to stem from Luther's example, and has been given scholarly attention, in the period of mid-16th century to mid-18th century. The printing of funeral sermons had become normal by around 1550, and over 200,000 German funeral homilies survive.

The model for Protestant funeral sermons was outlined in De formandis concionibus sacris by Andreas Hyperius (English translation 1577). In his schematic, praise in preaching was only for the godly dead; it needed to serve exhortation and exegesis, the former having two audiences, "godly" and "the multitude".

The initial Calvinist attitude was different from the Lutheran. An early Protestant hurdle for Calvinists was Pierre Caroli's advocacy of prayers for the dead. Amy Nelson Burnett has argued that, mid-16th century, the Reformed churches of Basel and the Palatinate were exceptional in the sermons at funerals. In the Church of Scotland, the Book of Discipline made a general rejection of funeral sermons. In practice there were some exceptions.

Under Elizabeth I some English Puritan ministers opposed funeral sermons. By the beginning of the 17th century, however, views had changed and funeral sermons had become standard in the Reformed tradition. Diarmaid MacCulloch writes that Puritans "came to abandon their dislike of the panegyric funeral sermon". Exemplified by Samuel Clarke, Puritan writers created a genre that can be described as hagiographic that drew on funeral sermons and short biographies.

In New England at the middle of the 17th century funeral rituals were still sparse. The funeral sermon then came in as a vehicle for jeremiad.

For the British Particular Baptist tradition in the 18th century, Cook in looking at funeral sermons of John Brine and Benjamin Wallin (1711–1782) argues first for the continuing importance of the plain style scheme of the Puritan William Perkins published in his The Arte of Prophesying (1607). It assumes scripture exposition, followed by a "uses" section applying the points made, and a brief "memorial section" of life writing. Brine applies it, but with scant attention to the "uses". Wallin adheres to the "asymmetric structure" of exposition outweighing life writing, employs "uses" sections, but might make the "memorial section" up to a third of the whole.

Wolffe argues, for British funeral sermons of the Victorian period, there was a transition in the decades 1860 to 1880, from the model of giving priority to exegesis of scripture, to an emphasis on life writing.

== The Catholic tradition ==
In 1615 the German theological writer Matthäus Tympius (de:Matthäus Tympius)) published a collection of funeral sermons to help Catholic parish priests. He promoted Tridentine reform from Münster. Systematic indexing of funeral sermons at this period could lead to easy correlation with the daily pericope, so that the expository part of the sermon could come from an existing source.

The French bishop Jacques-Bénigne Bossuet owed much of his reputation as an orator to a series of funeral addresses on prominent persons of the reign of Louis XIV. He built on existing structures for such sermons, innovated and spoke at length, and included accessible religious instruction alongside laudatory comments. Research has recovered many other early modern Catholic funeral sermons.
