= Jussie =

Jussie or Jussiê can be a given name or a surname. Notable people with the name include:

- Jussie Smollett, American actor, filmmaker, and singer
- Jussiê Ferreira Vieira (born 1983), Brazilian football second striker
- Jeanne de Jussie (1503–1561), Geneva-based nun and writer
