= Isabelle Graesslé =

French theologian

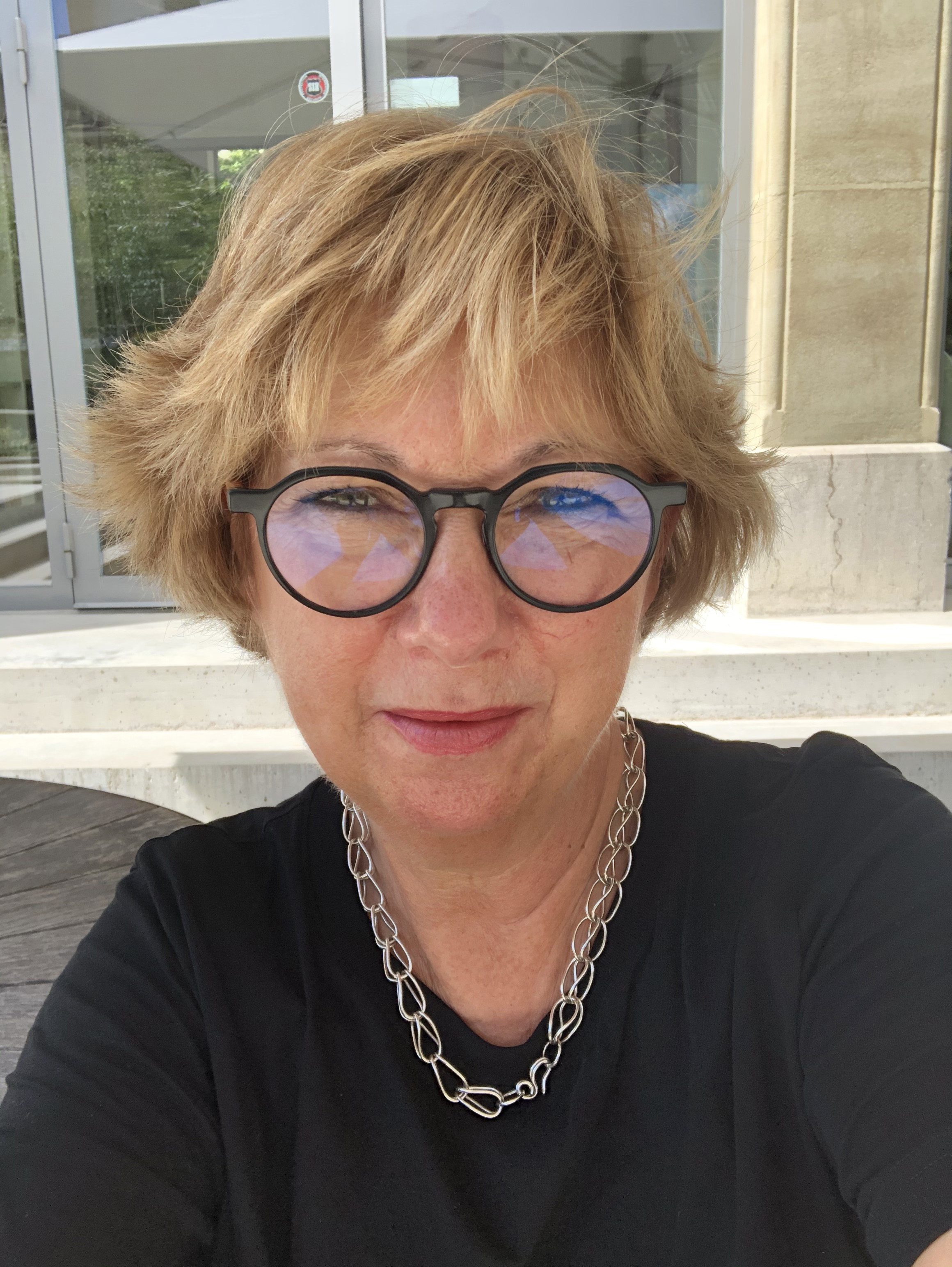
- Isabelle Graesslé in 2020
- Born: 23 February 1959 (age 67); Strasbourg, Alsace, France
- Education: Strasbourg; Geneva; United Theological Seminary, OH; Bern
- Occupations: theologian university teacher church moderator museum director feminist & writer

Isabelle Graesslé (born 23 February 1959) is a French born theologian, feminist and former museum director, based in Geneva.

In 2001 she was appointed moderator of ministers and deacons at the Protestant Church of Geneva. The position dates back to 1541 when it was created by John Calvin, but Graesslé, after 460 years, was the first woman to occupy it. In 2004 she was appointed the first director of the International Reformation Museum which opened the next year in Geneva, but she resigned the post in 2016. It was indicated that her departure followed disagreement about levels of funding.

== Life ==
The time she spent studying in Ohio was important in the development of a feminist context for Isabelle Graesslé's academic and pastoral work.

- "The United States enabled me to discover that an impressive number of women have impacted the history of Christianity, but then been ignored in subsequent historical research".
- "Les États-Unis m’ont permis ... de découvrir qu’un nombre impressionnant de femmes ont jalonné l’histoire du christianisme et qu’elles avaient été passées sous silence dans les recherches antérieures."

Isabelle Graesslé was born in Strasbourg. She was her parents' only child. On successful completion of her school studies she went on to undertake the "Grandes Écoles" preparation course. She studied Philology at Strasbourg, and then Theology at both Geneva and the United Theological Seminary in Dayton, Ohio from where she obtained a Master of Divinity qualification. Her doctorate, from the Protestant Theology Faculty at Strasbourg followed in 1988. She was supervised for her dissertation by Gilbert Vincent. Her topic was "Elements for a Rhetoric of Preaching: Readings of Athanase Josué Coquerel" ("Éléments pour une rhétorique de la prédication: Lectures d'Athanase Coquerel"). Her habilitation, obtained from the University of Bern in 2004, opened the way, potentially, to a lifelong university professorial career.

Meanwhile, in 1987 Graesslé became a part-time pastor at the Protestant chaplaincy to the University of Geneva and director of the Centre for Protestant Studies. Between 1995 and 2002, within the curriculum at the Centre she taught Gender Studies at Geneva and, on the north shore, at Lausanne. The course she taught was entitled simply "Women and Religion" which enabled her to address a range of religious traditions that varied over the years, but always from the same starting points: discerning an ambivalent relationship between women and religion, the balance of tensions created within religious institutions by the new challenges presented by women's emancipation, and finally the preconception of a specific link between female sexuality and the prohibition on priesthood. It is apparent that there were some at the university who viewed Graesslé's approach with disfavour.

In 1998 she became vice-president of the "college" of ministers and deacons at the Protestant Church of Geneva. Three years later, in August 2001, she was elected moderator - effectively leader - of the institution. Her electors were aware that "Business as usual" was not on her the agenda. In an interview with the Tribune de Genève she explained: "I told them clearly that I was not going to be their Amélie Poulain. I was determined to separate myself from this idea of the maternal woman, which was still embedded in the collective spirit. I was there to take a lead, support, encourage and indeed admonish all these ministers. Be assured that this task has not always been so simple".

- "On a beautiful Sunday in October, during my final year as moderator, when we unveiled the name of Marie Dentière on the Reformation Wall in Geneva, it was a victory over amnesia, contempt and envy! This great literary scholar of the sixteenth century, with her astonishing career and hardened character, whose reputation had been at best neglected and at worst traduced, was at last rehabilitated. An American university has even just published her output translated into English".
- "Lorsqu’en 2003, dernière année de ma modérature, en un beau dimanche d’octobre, nous avons dévoilé le nom de Marie Dentière devant le Mur des Réformateurs à Genève, c’était une victoire sur l’oubli, le mépris, l’envie aussi ! Cette grande lettrée du XVIe siècle, au parcours étonnant et au caractère bien trempé, dont la réputation avait été au mieux négligée, au pire salie par des générations entières, était enfin réhabilitée. Une universitaire américaine vient même de publier son œuvre en anglais."

After finishing her three years duty as moderator, she accepted the position as director of the new International Reformation Museum. The offer was timely, coming soon after her habilitation, and six months after her application for a full professorship with the Theology Faculty at the University of Geneva, where she taught, had been turned down. Twenty years as a pastor and university teacher had provided an excellent apprenticeship for the important museum job. She resigned unexpectedly, after ten years, in February 2016.

== Marie Dentière ==
Graesslé is also known for having demonstrated the key contribution of Marie Dentière to the Reformation in Geneva. It was in response to Graesslé's advocacy that Dentière's name was added to those of the men commemorated on the Reformation Wall monument in the grounds of the University, built into the old city walls.

== Output (selection) ==
- La rhétorique entre bonne et mauvaise foi, Perspectives missionnaires No. 18, 1989, p. 38-57.
- Reflections on European Feminist Theology, in Women's Visions. Theological Reflections, Celebration, Action. Herausgeberin: Ofelia Ortega, Genève, WCC, 1995, p. 52-60.
- Les couples bibliques à la recherche du divin, Bulletin du CPE 2 (1996), p. 3-30.
- La théologie féministe en Suisse. Dialogue avec Ina Praetorius, Jahrbuch der Europäischen Gesellschaft für Frauen in der theologischen Forschung No. 4, 1996, p. 116-128.
- « Théologie et féminisme : de l'affrontement à l'embellie », p. 149-160, in Où va Dieu? Revue de l'université de Bruxelles, Bruxelles, éditions Complexes, 1999.
- Unterwegs zu neuen Horizonten. Bergs am Irchel, KiK-Verl., 2001
- Pierre Bühler, Isabelle Graesslé, Christoph D. Müller (éds.), Qui a peur des homosexuel-les? Évaluation et discussion des prises de position des Églises protestantes de Suisse, Genève, Labor et Fides, 2001.
- Isabelle Graesslé, «Vie et légendes de Marie Dentière », Bulletin du Centre protestant d’études, vol. année 55, n^{o} 1, 2003
- Johannes Calvin und die Reformation in Genf, Zurich, SJW, 2010.
- "La théologie féministe en Suisse. Dialogue avec Ina Praetorius " (1996). Yearbook of the European Society of Women in Theological Research, 4, pp. 116–128.
- " Théologie et féminisme : de l’affrontement à l’embellie " (1999). Où va Dieu ? Revue de l’Université de Bruxelles, 1, pp. 149–160.
- Qui a peur des homosexuel·le·s ? Évaluation et discussion des prises de position des Églises protestantes de Suisse (2001) (P. Bühler, I. Graessle et C. Müller). Genève : Labor et Fides.
- "Dieu masculin " (2002). In P. Gibert et D. Marguerat (dir.), Dieu, vingt-six portraits bibliques (pp. 113–122). Paris : Bayard.
- " Vie et légendes de Marie Dentière " (2003). Bulletin du CPE, 1.
- "L’ecclésiologie en héritage : de l’impasse au passage" (2003). Études Théologiques et Religieuses, 78 (3), pp. 351–366.
- Prier 7 Jours avec la Bible. L’Évangile de Matthieu (2007). Paris : Bayard.
