= Jeanne de Jussie =

Genevan nun and writer (1503–1561)

Jeanne de Jussie (1503 – 7 November 1561) was a Genevan Roman Catholic nun and writer. She documented the role of the Protestant Reformation in the Poor Clares convent in Geneva.

== Early life ==
Born to Louis and Jeanne de Jussie in Jussy-l'évèque – in the former province of Chablais – Jeanne was the youngest of six children who survived infancy. She was apparently schooled in Geneva. Her father Louis died before 1519, leaving an estate; Jeanne's uncle, Amédée, named his own son (Georges) heir to the family castle in Jussy-l'Évêque, causing protest from Louis' wife and children. After a costly legal battle, the family was forced out of the castle and Jeanne's brothers sold off the remaining property. Jeanne would leave for the convent in 1521 at the age of 18. Her mother would pass away in 1535.

== Convent life ==
The Poor Clares swore to “chastity, poverty, obedience, and enclosure.” Although dowries were not required, families often provided a monetary contribution. Poor Clares kept short hair cuts and went barefoot, wearing wool garments, a coat, a linen hood and headband, and a simple rope belt with four knots to represent the four vows. They were excused from fasting only on Christmas and during illness. Otherwise, the nuns occupied themselves with housekeeping and chores. Because of her education, Jeanne was appointed the convent's secretary by 1530. She would be responsible for writing letters as the convent's écrivaine to plead protection from the Duke of Savoy, the bishop, and other officials.

The Convent of Saint Clare in Geneva (or “Monastère Jésus de Bethléem”), established by Yolande of Valois in 1473, was situated where the Palais de Justice now stands. Because of Yolande's marriage to the Duke of Savoy the convent would maintain a close connection to the House of Savoy. In fact, Jeanne opens her work with mentions of Charles III of Savoy (Duke of Savoy) and Beatrice of Portugal (Duchess of Savoy), as well as their children “Louis, Monseigneur the Prince of Piedmont,” Philibert Emmanuel (Emanuele Filiberto), “Lady Catherine Charlotte,” and Philippe. François, Count of Gruyère, donated land for the convent, which would begin construction in 1474 after purchasing additional land from André Baudichon and Claude Granger.

The abbess at the time of Jeanne's writing was Louise Rambo, assisted by vicaress Pernette de Montluel, who would succeed Rambo after her death in 1538. Jeanne was elected abbess in 1548 after their move to the Monastery of the Holy Cross in Annecy in 1535 and passed the position to Claude de Pierrefleur after her death in 1561. Twenty-four nuns lived in the convent at the time Jeanne wrote The Short Chronicle, likely with eight discreets- as prescribed by the order of Saint Clare- portresses, a bursar, cooks, a nurse, lay sisters, tertiary sisters, and possibly a laundress, a sacristan, and a gardener.

Because of the constant pillaging by Reformers, at times only the church of the convent remained open in the city- eventually forced to close- and priests and monks no longer wore their habits. Eventually, the situation came to a point where clerics carried weapons to defend themselves when in public.

After moving to the Monastery of the Holy Cross in Annecy in 1535, the convent was officially dissolved on 8 July 1793. The building was turned into a hospital, then the Palais de Justice. The monastery where they found refuge was turned into a cotton mill with a plaque commemorating the Poor Clares.

== The Short Chronicle ==
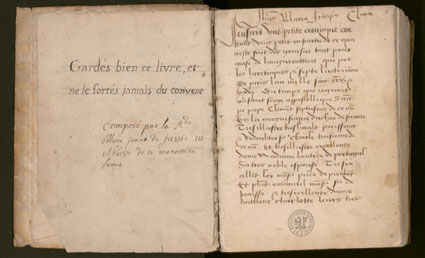
A manuscript copy of the Short Chronicle

The work might have been written between 1535 and 1547. According to Helmut Feld, Jeanne began writing around 1535 as a record for future nuns. Both extant copies of the manuscript are available at the Library of Geneva. It was first published in 1611 by the Catholic press of the Frères Du Four in Chambéry as Le levain du Calvinisme, ou commencement de l'heresie de Geneve (The Leaven of Calvinism, or Beginning of the Heresy of Geneva), despite the fact that Jeanne never mentions Calvin directly in the text. In the 19th century translations appeared in Italian and German, as well as critical editions in French. Finally, in 1996 a complete version of the text was published by Helmut Feld as Petite chronique, the basis for an English translation by Carrie F. Klaus. Henri Roth wrote a master's thesis on the chronicle, as well as an article in the Revue du Vieux Genève.

Scholars today often study the text from a feminist view. Jeanne argued that “women were truer Catholics than men,” fighting for their chastity against heretics such as Marie Dentière, who would attempt to persuade the nuns to marry. The perspective provided in the chronicle provided evidence that “women played a more active role” in the Reformation than previously assumed. Jeanne not only describes events such as battles from the point of view of women and wives but recounts the instances in which they were “severely beaten, tricked, and tortured” for their beliefs, especially by their husbands. She went so far as to insist that women surpassed men in making deliberate decisions to preserve their religion.

Jeanne's account also presents the importance of “privacy and sexual segregation” in the convent, dramatizing the struggle as an assault on the nuns' right to their own space. Several groups attempted to break into the convent, prevented largely by its architecture. More generally, the text also offers a Catholic perspective on the Protestant Reformation in Geneva, normally linked to Jean Calvin's advances starting in 1536. Some sources praise the chronicle for its literary merit.

=== Historical references ===
Jeanne's writing, alternating between first- and second-person perspective, encapsulates Catholic sentiments of the time and provides an account of events between 1526–1535 as a witness and active defendant against the Reformation. She employs derogatory terms for Protestants, indiscriminately calling them Lutherans, Mammelukes, and Huguenots with only Catholics as true Christians. Like others at the time, Jeanne compares her enemies to Jews and Turks. She provides a short description of the Grand Turk as “a glutton and a disloyal, insatiable dog” for having an unlimited number of wives as representative of the Turkish culture and defends disrespectful acts of Catholics towards others such as pouring urine on a heretic's grave. Throughout the work she describes the work of Protestants to destroy or pillage Catholic property, especially monasteries and churches, among them Vufflens-le-Château, Allaman Castle, Castle of Perroy, Nyon Castle, Rolle Castle, Castle of Saconnex, Château Gaillard, Castle of Villette, the castles of Madame of Saint-Genix and Madame of Rossylon, the church of Annemasse, Castle of Confignon, and Castle of Peney. Jeanne mentions the Shroud of Turin, then owned by the Duke of Savoy. She also uses saints' holidays to reference calendar dates, typical of Catholic nuns.

Jeanne also describes general events. The plague was mentioned in 1530, spread by heretics who “plotted to kill all the leaders” by “[rubbing] it on the locks of doors and... in fruits and in handkerchiefs.” She mentions Martin Luther's Ninety-five Theses in 1518 and his subsequent excommunication by Pope Leo X. The Battle of Kappel took place in 1531. Halley's Comet was seen the same year; another comet was again visible from August to November in 1532. The Grand Turk's army would be defeated in Esztergom, followed by a letter sent from him to the Pope.

Jeanne by no means strives for what we would today describe as historical accuracy. Along with an apparent bias, she often credits her knowledge to gossip. However, her chronicle holds importance in its singularity against the works of countless Reformers in Geneva.

=== Summary ===
The Short Chronicle's narrative involves many historical figures and dates important to the Protestant Reformation in Geneva and the surrounding areas. Jeanne names Pierre de la Baume as the bishop of Geneva in 1526, whom she calls the Monseigneur of Geneva throughout the chronicle. Jeanne claims Guillaume Farel gave a sermon in German, although more likely she mistook him for Gaspard Grossman. The Bishop of Belley was requested to help the city prevent future pillaging to no avail. Finally, Farel arrived in Geneva with two associates (Pierre Robert Olivétan and Antoine Saunier), all tried by the Abbot of Bonmont and thrown out of the city. They would be followed by Antoine Froment. On 28 March 1533, a battle between Catholics and Protestants took place, described largely from the view of women and wives and finally resolved with the exchange of hostages and, later, peaceful laws. That December, both sides would prepare for civil war, witnessed personally by Jeanne. However, the government officials pacified them.

From that point on, however, the situation for Catholics became increasingly dangerous. Jeanne reports constant cases of destruction to Catholic property, especially as iconoclastic actions, as well as executions. Four heretical preachers (Guillaume Farel, Pierre Viret, Antoine Froment, and Alexandre Canus) entered the city to preach and another battle almost occurred that December. Farel began to baptize and marry Protestants in 1534. A woman named Hemme Faulson visited the convent to see her aunt (Claudine Lignotte) and her sister (Blaisine Varembert) but was turned away after attempting to convert them. Defacement of Catholic icons reached a peak that summer and the bishop excommunicated the Genevans. In September, a captain from Bern breached the convent walls on orders to inspect the building, and from then on it would be targeted for abuse. After Farel and Viret establish themselves in a nearby monastery, they often harass the convent and distribute heretical articles to advertise a disputation, which was promptly forbidden by the bishop.

Heretics came to the convent to inform the nuns that they were required to attend, but they remained vigilant. Later the father confessor recounted what he witnessed at the disputation: Reformer Jaques Bernard continuously lost his arguments against the Dominican friar Jean Chapuis, so Chapuis was excluded from the remaining days. Farel and Viret then attempt to preach at the convent, forcefully separating the nuns. After Hemme Faulson returns she initiates a long, successful affair to retrieve her sister Blaisine from the convent as well as much of its possessions under the claim that they belonged to Blaisine. In addition to Hemme Faulson and her sister, Marie Dentière, Claude Bernard, Claudine Levet, and city syndics approached the nuns, finally culminating in the nuns' decision to leave. After stopping in Saint-Julien and the Castle of La Perrière, where they resumed the cloistered life, the nuns finally arrived in Annecy, where they established themselves in the Monastery of the Holy Cross. Jeanne devotes the last pages of her chronicle to the family of Savoy, who provide shelter on the way to and within Annecy.

=== Women ===
Jeanne dedicates a section of the account to the “staunchness” of Catholic women. These women refused to join their Protestant husbands and were punished. Jeanne especially praises young women and daughters for defying their fathers. She recounts those who sneaked out of prison, chased after men who took away and tortured Catholics, and one who stole her baby from a Lutheran baptism.

==== Celibacy ====
Throughout The Short Chronicle Jeanne goes so far as to forsake marriage as heresy. She admits that she has witnessed the corruption of priests but assures the reader that those deeds would not go unpunished. At some points, she refuses to describe marriages performed by Reformers such as Farel to shield herself from its perversion. Eventually, Reformers would breach the convent and preach their ideas of marriage, attempting to force the nuns to take a spouse. At other points, she simply records those events by insulting the married couple and Reformers as “[having] a very bad reputation,” “bastard,” “wicked,” and “miserable.” Except in the case of Blaisine Varembert, the Reformers lost interest after the nuns refused to cooperate; they were given a safe departure from the city.

==== Marie Dentière ====
Jeanne most famously defends herself against Marie Dentière, a former nun. They disagreed most particularly about chastity and virtue and the right of women to preach. Jeanne calls her a “false, wrinkled abbess with a devilish tongue” who “meddled in preaching and perverting pious people.”
