= Barbara von Wertheim =

- Countess of Wertheim
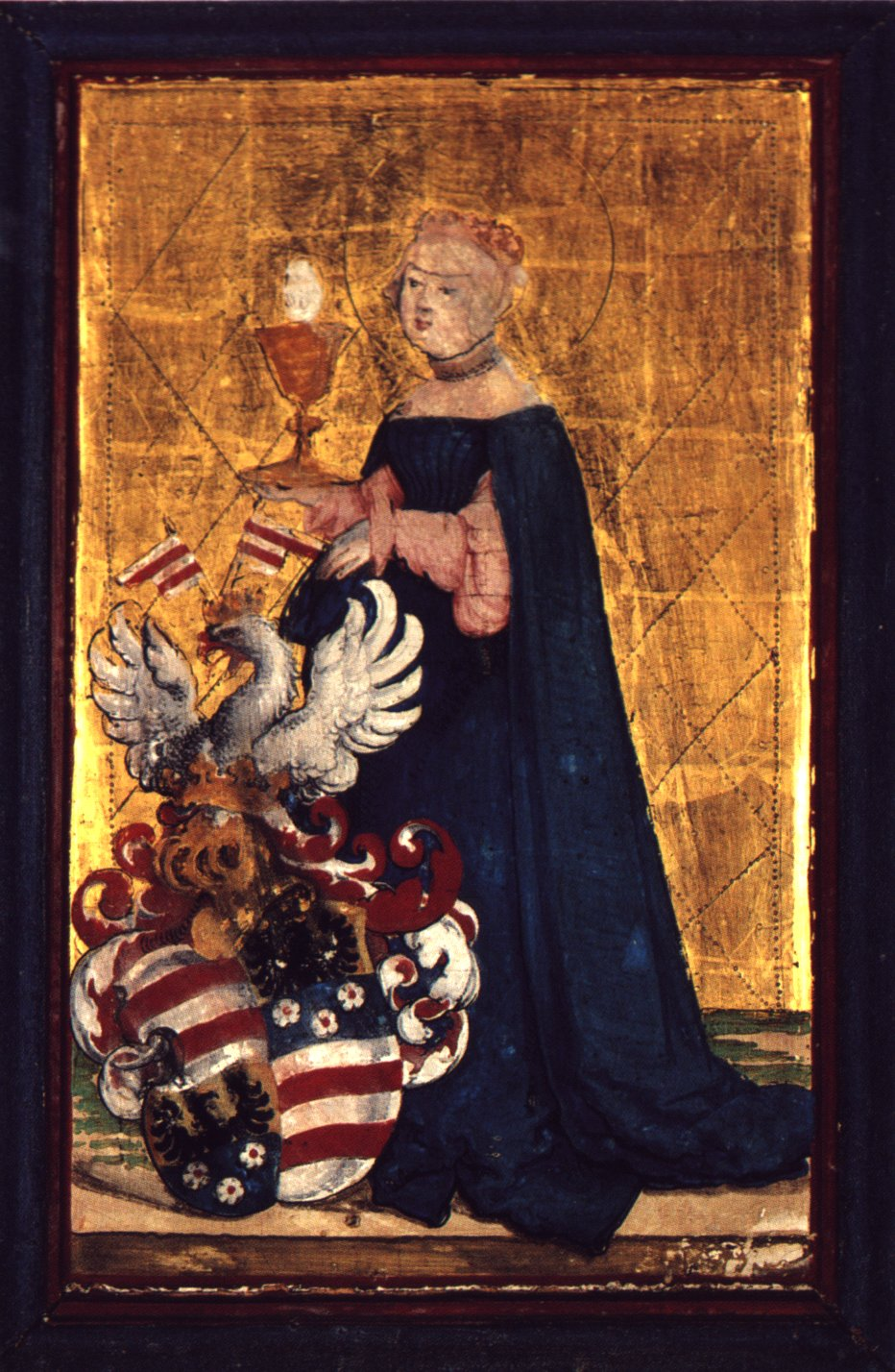
- Born: 1500
- Died: 29 April 1561 (aged 60–61)

Barbara von Wertheim (1500 – 29 April 1561) was a Countess of Wertheim by marriage, who served as the regent of the County of Wertheim and the Lordship of Breuberg from 1531 to 1547.

A member of the House of Schenk von Limpurg and the sister of Erasmus Schenk von Limpurg,Bishop of Strasbourg, she became Countess of Wertheim through her marriage to Count George II von Wertheim (née Schenkin von Limpurg). Following her husband's death, she governed the County of Wertheim and the Lordship of Breuberg during the minority of her son, Count Michael III of Wertheim, and is noted for her efforts to introduce and advance the Protestant Reformation within her domain.

== Life ==
=== Early years ===
Barbara von Wertheim was born in 1500 as Schenkin von Limpurg, the daughter of Schenk Christoph von Limpurg, a highly respected knight and head of the Gaildorf branch of Schenken von Limpurg family, and Countess Agnes von Werdenberg.

Brought up in traditional religious piety, Barbara received an education befitting a noblewoman of her era. The Schenken von Limpurg family placed great importance on education, and employed academic staff who encouraged this. In line with the motto of the time "learn to serve in order to rule", her tutelage prepared her for a secular role, which involved marrying an imperial count in addition to running the household, raising children according to their status, and representing the master of the house during his abesence.

At fifteen, Schenk Christoph died, leaving Agnes, Countess of Werdenberg, with twelve children - five sons and seven daughters. What role the mother played as guardian of the children is not known in detail, but it is known that she shared guardianship with her brother, Count Christoph von Werdenberg, and Schenk Georg von Limpurg. All three guardians appeared as 'curators and fermunders' in a later 'letter of marriage' for Georg II and Barbara von Limpurg[6]. Of the countess' daughters, only Barbara entered a marriage, with her brother Erasmus Schenk von Limpurg taking an advisory role and receiving 'letters of sorrow' from her.

The Zimmer Chronicle records a vision Barbara von Limpurg is said to have seen in 1523; the account records sight of a 'marvellous face', then a headless horseman who 'rode through the Kocher' (a river flowing through Gaildorf) before disappearing. The vision was interpreted as a symbol of the possible end of the Schenken von Limpurg-Gaildorf dynasty after her father's death. This reflection of Barbara's destiny mirrored her later experience, when the death of her husband and son resulted in the Wertheim dynasty's extinction in the male line.

== Marriage to Count Georg II von Wertheim ==
At the age of 28, Barbara wed Count Georg II von Wertheim in 1528. This marriage was likely a familial arrangement, rather than a romantic one, as per the social conventions of the time. Barbara and Georg's union was intended to cement the longstanding friendship between their families and "the desire to build on it between the two named heirs".

In 1529, their first son Michael III was born. Barbara was pregnant with their second child when Georg succumbed unexpectedly to death at Breuberg Castle on Easter Monday, 17 April 1530. Following George's death, his 80-year-old father, Michael II, became the regent for a brief period. After his death, the couple's second child, a daughter named and baptised Barbara, was born.

== Guardian Regency of the County of Wertheim ==
As early as 1531, the Imperial Chamber Court granted her guardianship, appointing her brother, Schenk Wilhelm von Limpurg and Count Wilhelm IV von Ebterstein, a cousin of her husband, as her co-guardians on 24 May of the same year.

=== Countess Barabara and the Reformation ===
As Guardian Regent, upon the death of her husband George II in 1531, Barbara von Wertheim assumed responsibility for her two children and inherited his spiritual legacy of reforming the church in the locale. As early as 1521, George II had initiated gradual reforms in concurrence with Martin Luther. His father, Michael II, had additionally accepted his son's spiritual development without hesitation when he resumed the Regency following George II's death until his own passing in 1531.

George II and his theological counsel, a Franciscan named Johann Eberlin von Günzberg († 1533), had laid the foundations for various reforms together. In 1527/28, Johann Eberlin wrote a church order in Wertheim that was still enforced following George's death in 1531. Countess Barbara was reputed to have stipulated that it be continually upheld.

Barbara was acquainted with Johann Eberlin as a dependable advisor to her husband, and was aware of his reformatory attempts; she subsequently orientated herself to his church order, which she also instructed pastors within the area of Breuberg to abide by in 1537.

In her role as Guardian Regent, Countess Barbara was obliged to consult her co-guardians on all decisions of consequence. Despite this requirement, she was often listed as the primary contact person for the parish priests on ecclesiastical issues, and she campaigned for the appointment of Reformation ministers in the area. On 14 May 1537, Countess Barbara announced a decree in tandem with her 'fellow parish priests'; highlighting her integral involvement in the reformation of the Church in the dominion of Breuberg.

In the years that followed, Countess Barbara acted with foresight by appointing reformed clergy to parish positions. Taking into account that there were still no legal provisions for dismissing non-reformist clergy, she was careful to progress cautiously. Her policies regarding the spiritual renewal of the Breuberg district were typical of those adopted by peripheral areas of the countryside during the 1530s and 1540s. She was responsible for supplying pastors to serve the parishioners, cultivating the next generation of theologians, establishing schools, finding financial support for teachers, as well as nurturing the poor and the ailing.

Countess Barbara had to tackle the disaster brought about by an epidemic in 1541-42. Like most of the rural populace, pastors were reliant on regional agricultural products and this could lead to drought or flooding-induced scarcity, resulting in unrest among the peasantry. Barbara had already experienced the German Peasants' War in her hometown, and was acutely aware of how unruly the rural masses could become if they felt they were being treated unjustly. Nonetheless, there are no accounts of public disturbances or desecration of churches, their furnishings or paintings in the region of Wertheim associated with the countess. Her main priority seems to have been providing a platform for school education, for which she secured sufficient financial funding.

Countess Barbara was especially focused on educational matters. She succeeded, step by step, in achieving "sufficient financial foundation for this institution."

During the 1540s, Barbara actively served as the guardian of her son, whom she sent to study in Wittenberg and Leipzig in 1544, accompanied by his cousin, Christoph III of Limpurg (1531–1574). A surviving letter addressed to Joachim Camerarius, a humanist scholar, professor in Leipzig, and a friend of Melanchthon, indicates that her son resided in Camerarius's home in 1544, reflecting a notable regard for the young count. Countess Barbara extended an invitation to Joachim Camerarius to visit Wertheim, although it is improbable that he accepted. In early 1545, Michael III communicated with his guardian, Count Wilhelm von Eberbach, stating his intention to return to Wertheim in two months at the behest of Wilhelm and his mother. The escalating tensions between the emperor and his Protestant adversaries, along with the looming threat of war, appear to have prompted the count's recall.

A letter from the Countess to Philipp Melanchthon from the same year indicates that Barbara also provided support to Deacon Friedrich Freiyer of Wertheim. She requested Melanchthon's assistance in facilitating his theological studies in Wittenberg. The Countess therefore endeavored to send other young people to Wittenberg for theological studies, in addition to her son and nephew.

== Death ==
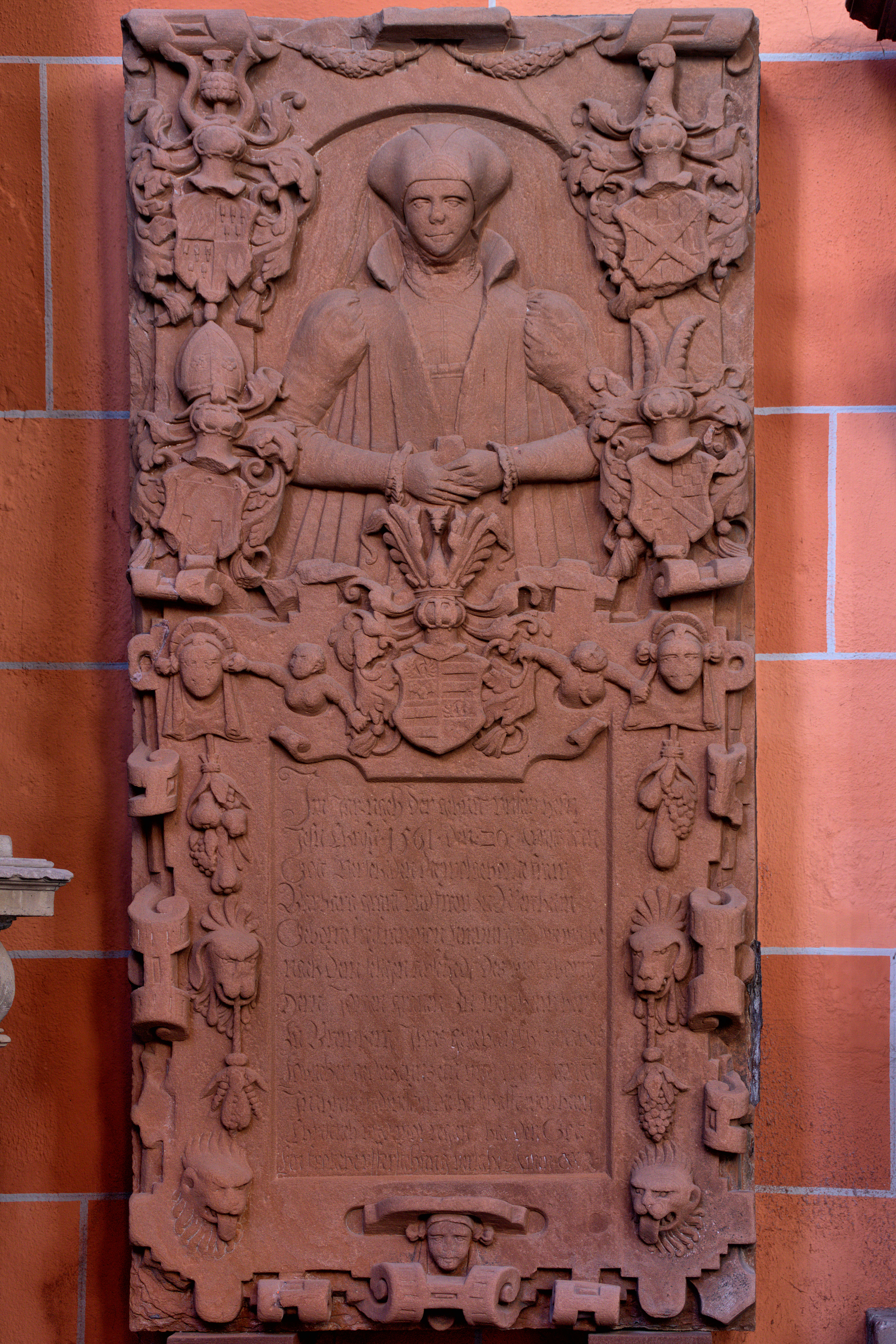
Gravestone of Barbara von Wertheim

Upon her death on 29 April 1561, she was buried in the Protestant collegiate church in Wertheim, where her tombstone remains to this day.

The tombstone is adorned with five coats of arms; those of Limpurg and Werdenberg are marked on the left, whereas the coats of arms of Oettinger and Baden-Sponheim occupy the right and the Wertheim-Breuberg coat of arms lies above the following inscription:

"In the year after the birth of our Lord Jesus Christ 1561 29 Aprilis died in God's name the well-born wife Barbara Graui[n] and wife of Wertheim born baroness of Limpurg who after the blessed death of the well-born Lord Jorgen Grauen zu Wertheim her To Brewberg her beloved spouse Laudable memory for one and thirty years In her sorrow has ruled the herschafft wertheim Christianly and well to whom God A happy resurrection grant Amen CWR."
