= Louise Hanssens =

Louise Hanssens or Anschyns (died 1599) was an abbess of Ter Hage Abbey, a house of Cistercian nuns in the County of Flanders.

== Life ==
Louise Hanssens was elected in succession to Amalberga Vos in 1572, and installed as abbess on 20 April 1573. In the chaos of the Iconoclastic Fury and the ensuing Dutch Revolt and in the aftermath of the All Saints' Flood of 1570, the monastery's annual income had shrunk from 4,000 pounds to 200 pounds. The prevailing insecurity nevertheless led Abbess Hanssens in 1574 to buy a new refuge for the monastery in Ghent. The monastery was attacked by rebels on 17 June 1574 during Mass, and the nuns temporarily relocated to Ghent.

In 1578 the monastery was again attacked by rebels and the nuns again took refuge in Ghent, living dispersed with relatives because the city had come under Calvinist rule. In 1581, the abbess and 26 sisters travelled to Saint-Omer, where they were given refuge by Bishop Jean Six until the fall of the Calvinist regime in Ghent in 1584. Plans were made to return to Axel, but in 1586 the town was taken over by rebel forces, so the nuns remained in Ghent. In 1589 Abbess Hanssens secured a house in the Molenaarsstraat in which the monastery could be permanently re-established. She was still living there at the time of her death on 20 May 1599.
