= Pierre Caroli =

French refugee and religious figure

- Born: 1480; Rozay-en-Brie, France
- Died: after 1545
- Education: University of Paris
- Occupations: Theologian, clergyman
- Known for: Theological disputes with John Calvin and Guillaume Farel; first pastor of Lausanne
- Movement: Protestant Reformation

Pierre Caroli (born 1480 in Rozay-en-Brie; died probably after 1545) was a French theologian and religious figure active during the Reformation.

He was a Doctor of theology of the University of Paris, and he was receptive to the ideas of the Protestant Reformation. However, he entered into open confrontation with John Calvin, the central figure of French Protestantism. In a theological dispute, Caroli accused Calvin and Guillaume Farel of Arianism and Sabellianism.

Caroli was a teacher of theology in Paris in 1520. There he had been under the influence of a leader of the humanists, Jacques Faber Stapulensis (Lefèvre d'Etaples), and belonged to the group supporting the return of the bishop Guillaume Briçonnet de Meaux. The 'Circle of Meaux' included Antoine Froment, Marie Dentière, Gérard Roussel, and Clément Marot.

Caroli was professor in the Sorbonne for some years. However, in 1525, his theses on the Epistles of Paul had unleashed an attack on him by of the censorship, and he was expelled from the Sorbonne.

The sister of the king, Marguerite de Navarre, called on his services and gave him in 1530 a position in a parish in Alençon. In 1534, the Protestants were persecuted. Like Calvin, Caroli was a fugitive. He went to Geneva in 1535 and joined Farel there. Shortly afterwards he went to Basel, where he studied Hebrew and became a friend of Simon Grynaeus and Oswald Myconius. In 1536 he took part in the great theological dispute in Lausanne, supporting the reformation cause.

In consequence of his participation in the dispute, he gained recognition in Bern, which nominated him as the first pastor of Lausanne. He entered then into conflict with Calvin and Farel, having run away from Lausanne, leaving his wife and abandoning the Protestant faith. The government of Bern banished Caroli in 1537. Caroli moved to Montpellier. Expelled from France, he went in 1539 to Neuenberg, where he made peace with the Swiss reformers, without however receiving any position.

== Publications ==
His writings include

- Refutatio blasphemiae farellistarum in sacrosanctam Trinitatem (1545).
- Une epistre de Maistre Pierre Caroly docteur de la Sorbone de Paris, faicte en forme de deffiance, et envoiée à Maistre Guillaume Farel serviteur de Jesus Christ et de son Eglise, avec la response (1543)

== Bibliography ==
- (in French) Reinhard Bodenmann, Les perdants. Pierre Caroli et les débuts de la Réforme en Romandie (= Nugae humanisticae sub signo Erasmi 19), Turnhout, 2016 (ISBN 978-2-503-56790-7)
