= Plain style in literature =

Form of English language communication

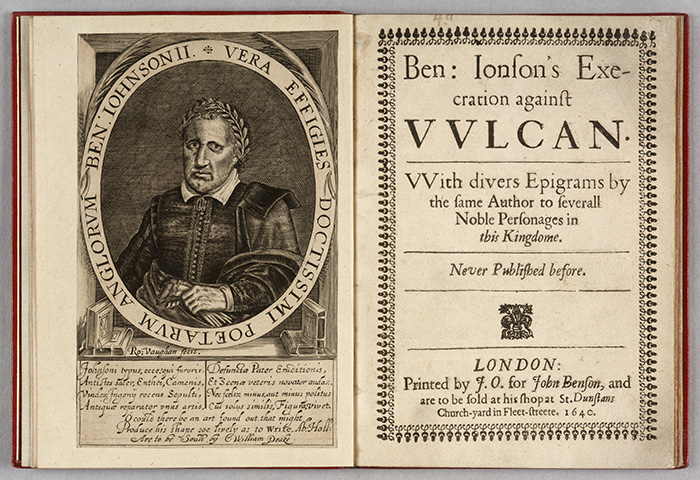
Ben Jonson's Execration Upon Vulcan, one of the first recorded forms of the plain style in English literature.

The plain style in literature, otherwise referred to as the 'low style', is the most common form of communication in the English language. It is a form of rhetoric which expresses a message very clearly to convey a direct meaning. The core values of the plain style in literature are "clarity, brevity and sincerity...". emphasising the dichotomous language forms and features between the plain style and the Baroque style, also referred to as the 'high style', in the English language.

The plain style has been recorded in use from as early as the 17th century by playwright Ben Jonson. Since then, the style has developed and become more refined through pop culture and slang in order to form today's plain style which is mainly through oral forms of communication. Plain style is also evident through other forms of communication such as e-mail communication, captioning on social media and through text messages, however is not as prominent in modern written text. Many political campaigns also employ use of the plain style to convey a clear and concise message to the intended audience.

Most people use the plain style through both written and oral modes of communication on a daily basis however are unaware of its status as a language form, particularly due to the simplicity and elegance of the mode.

== History ==
The plain style can be traced to as far back as the 17th century, whereby playwrights and scientists would use this form of communication to convey an important idea or theory. Ben Jonson, a playwright, used the plain style in his theatrical productions which earned him the title of the "first thoroughly classical poet in English literature". Along with theatre, the development of scientific theories such as the inductive method and empiricism required a simple language which would not distort or misrepresent data. Thus, the plain style became widely popularised in written communication for its accuracy.

In addition to this, Douglas Peterson explains that "predominantly Anglo-Saxon diction, folk proverb and metaphor" gave rise to the plain style as it was easily understood by lower class society which allowed for this style of communication to spread rapidly. Playwrights noticed their audience would be more responsive to clear messages rather than innuendos, double-entendres and hidden meanings, and thus altered their style of writing accordingly. The plain style was also used widely in Puritan practice, as sermons and poems were written and delivered in the plain style. This introduced the style to a much wider demographic, further normalising its use in society.

== Characteristics of plain style ==
The plain style has many distinctive characteristics which separate it from the Baroque style, however these tend to vary based upon the text type within which it is contained. It was much easier to distinguish between these two styles when these forms first evolved, however over time the reason for which people use either style, as well as the prevalence of each style in daily language, have moulded the characteristics of the form today.

== Prose ==
=== Written ===
In written texts, such as novels or poetry, the linguistics of the plain can be determined through the tone and flow of the text. Contrasted to stylised poetry and grand language, the plain style in written text types flows simply and cohesively without the use of rhetorical devices or disconjunctions. It is also written with a different intent. For example, when used in scientific reports, the plain style seeks to convey data as clearly and concisely as possible. This is because the author expects their audience to read the text with ease in order for them to fully grasp the meaning of the content of the text.

Yvor Winters, a poet and literary critic, explained the plain style was an alternate canon of the Elizabethan style of poetry. The way in which it was compared to the high style was that "one was plain, the other ornate and decorative". One of Winters' prodigies, J. V. Cunningham, inspired Winters to further understand this style as one "free of ornament, almost without sensory detail, and compact. But it is... highly sophisticated"

=== Spoken ===
Marjorie Garber explains that the plain style in speech is "often a cover for the most successful and duplicitous speech". This emphasises that although the plain style lacks complex rhetoric and literary devices, it can sometimes be manipulated by political opportunists, media outlets and other individuals in order to persuade the target audience to think a certain way, or evoke a certain emotion. This is all under the guise that because the language is so simple and disguised within plain speech, it is not often considered as a method by which individuals can be influenced about an idea.

Similar to the written aspect of the plain style, when used in speech the plain style allows the responder to consider what the individual is saying rather than the language they are using to convey their idea. For this reason, many politicians use the plain style in political campaign speeches to better connect with the populace and to clearly convey their intentions.

== Genres ==
As the plain style can be used across both written, spoken and visual text types, it can also be utilised in a variety of genres with a differing effect in each. For example, it was found that in contemporary poetry, the plain style "includes emotions... unsettles the limitations of genre and convention... articulates emotional states for which there is no norm". This allows for an interconnectedness between the poet's intention and idea and their responder, enhancing the ability of the responder to understand the body of the text at a much more immersive and personal level. This is particularly useful in texts which evolve around the thematic notions of love, grief and happiness.

Conversely, in the rigid forms of scientific reporting, the plain style allows for the accurate representation of data and results, free of any confusion between the reporter's findings and the responder analysing the information presented to them.

In modern films, the plain style is used in a written form through the script, which is presented to the audience via the oral communication depicted by the actors. This allows for directors to connect with their audience as they can cultivate the image of a realistic world within the film, and ensure that the underlying meaning of the film is conveyed effectively to the audience.
