= Weyn Ockers =

Dutch Protestant iconoclastic

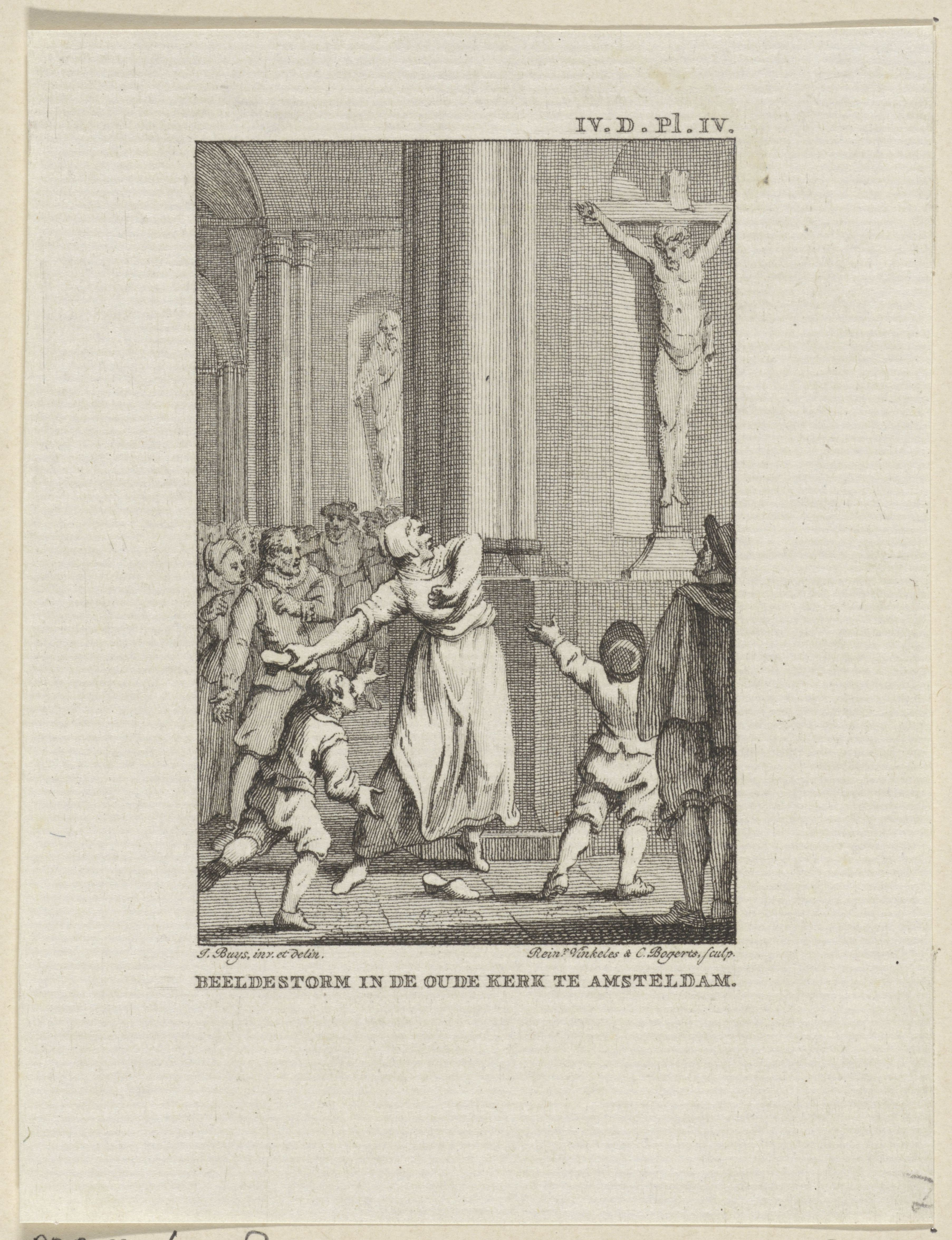
Weyn Ockers throws her slipper at a crucifix (print by Reinier Vinkeles)

Weyn Ockers, or Weyn Duijf Adriaen Ockersdr (died 22 June 1568 in Amsterdam), was a Dutch Protestant sentenced to death for heresy after having taken part in the famous Beeldenstorm, the iconoclastic riots, in Amsterdam in 1566.

Ockers was a member of the Amsterdam elite. Her father, Adriaen Ockersz, had been a notary on the Kalverstraat and her husband, Jurriaen ter Meulen, owned a house on the Zeedijk, then a wealthy neighborhood. Her mother's mother, Lijsbeth Jans, had been executed for participating in the anabaptist riots in Amsterdam in 1534–35. She must have been tall, as she was also known as "Lange [tall] Weyn".

In March 1568 she and her maid Trijn Hendricks were arrested for allegedly participating in the first day of the beeldenstorm in Amsterdam one and a half years earlier (23 August 1566) and particularly for taking home a small stone dog from a toppled over statue of Saint Roch in the Oude Kerk. On the March 13 hearing, both women denied this, while admitting that they briefly had been in that church that day and that they had visited Protestant sermons since. A week after their arrest, another person accused of heresy declared under torture that Weyn had thrown her slipper at a statue of the Virgin Mary on the altar; the priest of the Oude Kerk, Simon Slecht, had encouraged young women to adorn this statue with valuable objects, leading to accusations of enrichment and general ire. Under torture, Weyn confessed on March 21 that she had thrown her slipper, breaking a glass part of the altar in the process, and together with her maid Trijn had even broken several statues. Trijn did not confess anything under torture, but both women were sentenced to death for heresy. They were drowned in a water-filled wine barrel on Dam Square two months later.

The details of her case were written down by Laurens Jacobsz Reael, an early Protestant leader in Amsterdam and father of Laurens Reael, future Governor-General of the Dutch East Indies and admiral of the Dutch Republican Navy.
