= Antoine Froment =

Calvinist Protestant reformer

- Born: 1508; Mens, Isère
- Died: 1581 (aged 72–73); Geneva
- Citizenship: Republic of Geneva (1553)
- Occupations: Preacher, reformer
- Spouse: Marie Dentière

Antoine Froment (1508–1581) was a Calvinist Protestant reformer in Geneva. Froment is best remembered for his role in initiating and solidifying the Reformation in Geneva along with William Farel and John Calvin. His role in these events, however, is smaller compared to the tremendous accomplishments of Farel and Calvin.

== Early life ==
Froment was born in Mens, a town in the Dauphiné, and received a typical Christian education.He followed Farel’s Christian teachings and joined Farel on his travels across Switzerland. He spent a few years as deacon of a town outside of Geneva, and then at the age of 33 was made a pastor. He and his wife, Marie Dentière, remained active in the Genevan church despite their residency outside the city. Like her husband, Dentière was a vocal reformer and theologian with fiery, outspoken views.

== Geneva Reformation ==
After the people of Geneva had successfully overthrown their prince-bishop, Pierre de La Baume in 1533, Protestant leaders acted swiftly to influence the Genevans to their side. With the convincing of William Farel and his accomplice Froment, the government officially supported the Reformation in 1536. Both Farel and Froment were supported by the city of Bern to fulfill this goal.

While in Geneva, Froment founded a school and offered a free education in French reading and writing to anyone who would listen, and used the classroom as a forum for sermons and Romanist criticism. However at the time townspeople were strongly averse to the stringent religious ideas of Froment and Calvin, and during an outdoor sermon Froment was interrupted by angry clergy and townspeople and forced to flee. He often secretly returned to the city to assist his fellow reformers. Froment's role in the new church was replaced by Pierre Viret.

Froment and his wife were part of the 'Circle of Meaux', which also included Gérard Roussel, Pierre Caroli and Clément Marot.

== Later life ==
By the early 1540s Froment had abandoned his involvement in the church and opened a small shop. By that time Calvin and Farel had begun to show feelings of bitter animosity and vexation towards him, and more especially towards his wife Marie. Calvin's words show a particular dislike towards Froment's career duality as shopkeeper and preacher. A month before his death, Calvin wrote a letter to his colleagues recounting his first arrival at Geneva, writing:

- "...In addition, there was Master Antoine Saunier, and that superb preacher Froment who, having taken off his apron, would ascend the pulpit, and would afterwards go back to his shop, where he gossiped away and so preached twice over."

In 1548, Froment was again forced to flee after delivering an inflammatory sermon, this time criticizing local reformed church leaders for making profits and lacking Reformation fervor. Beginning in 1549, Froment assisted Bonivard in the creation of the Chronicle of the Republic, a major accomplishment in Froment's life. For the next decade or so, Froment lived as a notary, until in 1561, after marrying a second time following the death of his wife, he was convicted of adultery with a servant and banished for 10 years. As a recognition of his assistance in the Reformation efforts, he was allowed to live in Geneva, again as a notary from 1574 until his death in 1581.

== Bibliography ==
- Lewis W. Spitz (1985). The Rise of Modern Europe. New York, NY: Harper and Row. ISBN 0-06-013958-7.
- Émile G. Léonard (1968). A History of Protestantism, Volume One: The Reformation. Great Britain: Bobbs-Merrill Company Inc.
