= Ter Hage Abbey =

Ter Hage or Terhaegen Abbey was a community of Cistercian nuns established before 1269 at Axel in the County of Flanders (now in the Netherlands). In 1584, during the Dutch Revolt, the community took refuge in the city of Ghent, continuing there until 1794.

== History ==
The abbey was first mentioned in 1269, when the community temporarily relocated from Axel to a farm owned by the abbey near Merelbeke. The community returned to Axel in 1273. During the 16th century, the abbey became prominent as a centre of religion and charity under its abbess Amalberga Vos.

During the Iconoclastic Fury of 1566, the Calvinist preacher Caspar van der Heyden on 24 August called upon his hearers to "purge" the monastery. When the iconoclasts arrived, Abbess Amalberga negotiated that the nuns be given safe passage before the abbey was pillaged. The abbey also suffered damage from the All Saints' Flood of 1570, which caused considerable local devastation. In 1572, the abbess relocated the nuns to Ghent, where she had established a monastic refuge in 1544. She died there the same year and was succeeded by Louise Hanssens. Between 1572 and 1578, the community repeatedly moved back and forth between Axel and Ghent. From 1581 to 1584, they found refuge in Saint-Omer.

From 1584 onwards the community remained in Ghent, expanding their refuge into a full monastery. Their new abbey church was consecrated in 1614. The community was suppressed in 1794. In 1805 the abbey buildings became the mother house of the Sisters of Charity of Jesus and Mary.

== Our Lady of Axel ==
In 1278 the abbey acquired a marble statue of Mary. The nuns kept this statue with them on their wanderings and installed it in their new church in Ghent in 1614, where it became venerated under the name "Our Lady of Axel".
