= Engel Korsendochter =

Dutch Catholic activist (1503–1545)

Engel Korsendochter (1503 - 1545), was a Dutch Catholic activist, famous for leading a demonstration of 300 women in defense of a pilgrimage chapel and Catholicism in Amsterdam in 1531.

== Biography ==
Engel Korsendochter was born to the rich burghers Corsgen Elbertsznoon and Geertruyt Hendriksdr. van der Schelling and married to Heiman Jacobszoon, mayor of Amsterdam. Her spouse was a Protestant sympathizer. She herself was a convinced Catholic: her father was the founder of a Franciscan convent in Amsterdam, two of her sisters were nuns, while she was the leader of the Guild of the Holy Sacrament, a religious society that protected a pilgrimage chapel between Kalverstraat and Rokin, were a miracle allegedly took place in 1345, and which counted women from powerful burgher families among its members.

In 1531, the city authorities decided that the chapel should be torn down and replaced with a wool shed. Engel Korsendochter and her society protested against the decision. On 31 May 1531, three hundred women marched in protest against the destruction of the chapel and the increasingly Protestant sympathies in Amsterdam, led by Engel Korsendochter and the women of the Guild of the Holy Sacrament. The demonstration attracted great attention in contemporary Netherlands. The women were charged with four years of banishment or fines of 50 gulden for rebellion. The appealed to Charles V and defended their act as an act of defense for Catholicism. Most of them were pardoned.

Engel Korsendochter is portrayed on an altarpiece.
