= Amalberga Vos =

Amalberga Vos (died 25 August 1572) was the Abbess of Ter Hage Abbey at Axel in the County of Flanders (now in the Netherlands) from 1534 until 1572.

Her family and background is unknown, but she became a member of the monastery in 1529, and abbess five years later. She expanded the abbey and its importance considerably and in 1544 established a subsidiary monastic refuge in Ghent. During the Iconoclastic Fury of 1566, the Calvinist preacher Caspar van der Heyden on 24 August called for the "purging" of the monastery. Abbess Amalberga negotiated with the attackers so that the nuns were not molested but were given safe passage before the abbey was pillaged. In 1567 the monastery church was restored, but in 1570 heavy floods caused significant damage to the locality. In 1572 Amalberga Vos evacuated the nuns to Ghent, where she died on 25 August of that year. She was succeeded as abbess by Louise Hanssens.
