= Marie Dentière =

Walloon Protestant reformer and theologian (c. 1495–1561)

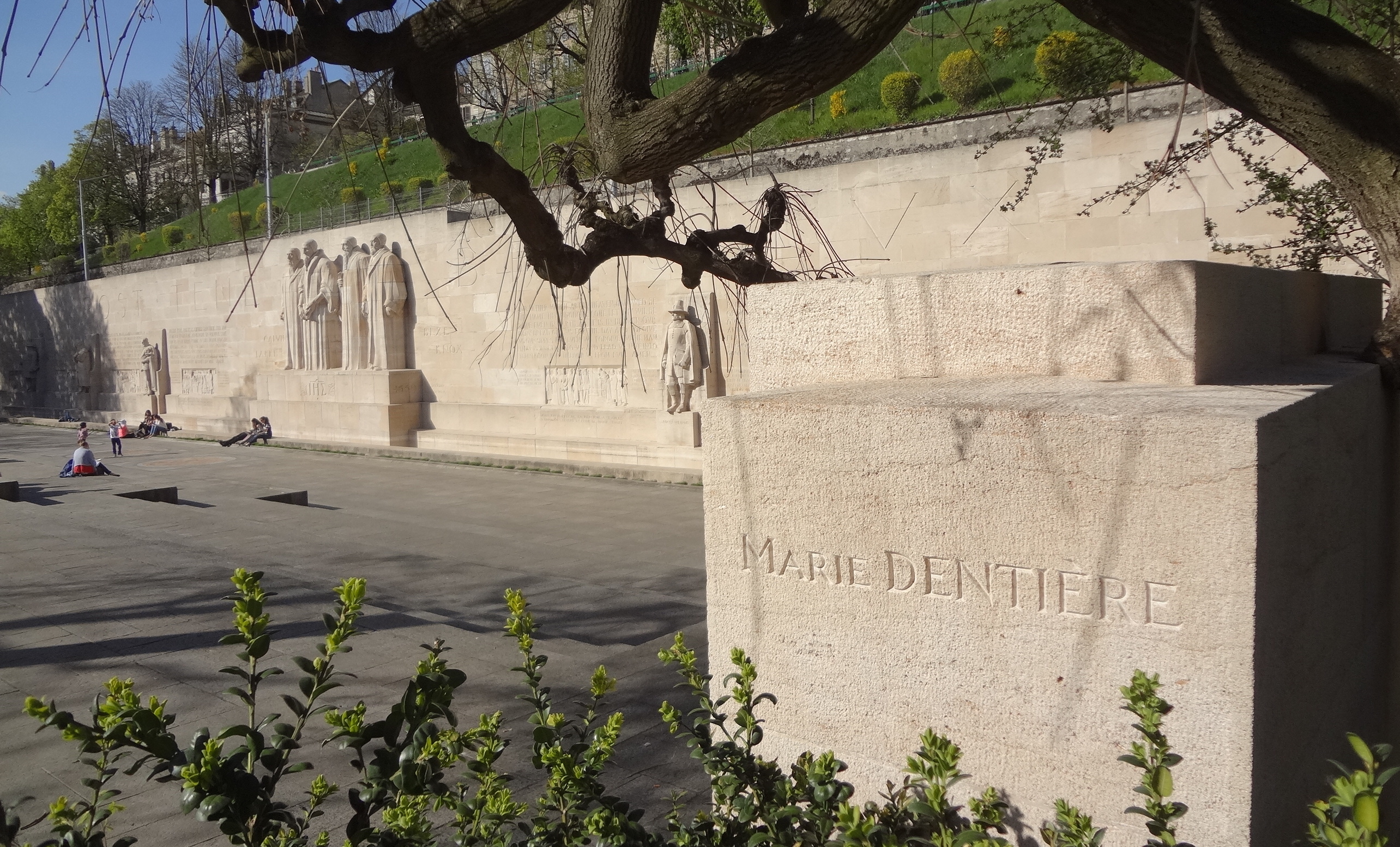
The only woman's name on the Reformation Wall in Geneva

Marie Dentière (c. 1495–1561) was a Walloon Protestant reformer and theologian, who moved to Geneva. She played an active role in Genevan religion and politics, in the closure of Geneva's convents, and preaching with such reformers as John Calvin and William Farel. In addition to her writings on the Reformation, Dentière's writings seem to be a defense and propagation of the female perspective in the rapidly changing world. Her second husband, Antoine Froment, was also active in the reformation.

== Biography ==
Much of Marie Dentière's early life remains unknown. She was born in Tournai (in modern Belgium) into a relatively well-off family of the lesser nobility. She entered the Augustinian nunnery of Saint-Nicolas-dés-Prés in Tournai at a young age in 1508, eventually becoming abbess in 1521.

Martin Luther's preaching against monasticism led her to flee to Strasbourg in 1524 to escape persecution - not only for abandoning her position as a nun, but for converting to the Reformation. Strasbourg was a popular refuge for Protestants at that time.

While in Strasbourg, in 1528, she married Simon Robert, a young priest. Soon they left for an area outside of Geneva to preach the Reformation, and had five children together. Robert died 5 years later in 1533, and the now widowed Dentière married Antoine Froment, who was at work in Geneva with Farel. Dentière and Froment were part of the 'Circle of Meaux', which also included Gérard Roussel, Pierre Caroli and Clément Marot.

Dentière's outspokenness strongly irritated Farel and Calvin, which in turn drove a rift between them and Froment.

=== Religious accomplishments ===
Dentière's work stresses the importance of the Reformation, but also the need for a larger role for women in religious practice. To Dentière, women and men were equally qualified and entitled to the interpretation of Scripture and practice of religion. In Geneva in 1536, following the successful rebellion against the Duke of Savoy and the local prince-bishop, Dentière composed The War and Deliverance of the City of Geneva. The work was published anonymously, and called for Genevans to adopt the Reformation.

In 1539, Dentière wrote an open letter to Marguerite of Navarre, sister of King Francis I of France. The letter, called the Epistre tres utile, or "very useful letter", (Note: Full title (in French):Epistre tres utile, faicte ey composee par une femme chrestienne de Tornay, envoyee a la Royne de Navarre, seur de Roy de France, contre les Turcz, Juifz, Faux crestiens, Anabaptists et Lutheriens (English: A very useful epistle, made and composed by a Christian woman of Tournai, sent to the Queen of Navarre, sister of the King of France, against the Turks, Jews, False Christians, Anabaptists and Lutherans).) called for an expulsion of Catholic clergy from France, advocated a greater role for women in the church, and criticized the foolishness of the Protestant clergy who compelled Calvin and Farel to leave Geneva. The letter was quickly suppressed due to its subversiveness.

However her encouragement of women's involvement in writing and theology angered Genevan authorities. Upon publication, the Epistle was seized and most of the copies destroyed. Only approximately 400 copies of the letter survived and entered circulation. Following the publication and subsequent suppression of Dentière's work, the Genevan council prevented the publication of any other woman author in the city for the rest of the 16th century.

== Bibliography ==
- Dentière, Marie (2004), McKinley, Mary B (ed.), Epistle to Marguerite de Navarre and Preface to a Sermon by John Calvin, The Other Voice in Early Modern Europe, Chicago: The University of Chicago Press, pp. xxx + 110.
- Disse, Dorothy, "Do we have two Gospels, One for Men and Another for Women?", Other Women's Voices, May 5, 2006, retrieved May 13, 2006.
- Graesslé, Rev. Dr. Isabelle, "Reformation Sunday: Ecclesiastes 9:14–18a; 1 Ephesians 2: 4–9; John 8:12–14b", Semper Reformanda, retrieved May 13, 2006.
- MacCulloch, Diarmaid (2003), The Reformation: A History, New York: Penguin, ISBN 0-670-03296-4.
