= Ghebbe Canter =

Dutch scholar and nun

- Born: c. 1460; Groningen (?)
- Died: after 15 June 1516; Yesse (now Essen), near Groningen
- Occupations: Nun, scholar
- Known for: Humanist education, religious devotion

Ghebbe Canter (born c. 1460 – died after 15 June 1516) was a Dutch nun and scholar known for her humanist education and intellectual reputation. She belonged to a prominent scholarly family in Groningen during the late 15th century.

== Early life and education ==
Ghebbe Canter was the daughter of Johannes Canter (c. 1424–c. 1499), a noted jurist and humanist from Groningen, and his wife Abel(e), who was herself reputed to be well educated. The Canter household was unusually scholarly: Johannes insisted that only Latin be spoken at home, including by the servants, which meant his children learned Latin more fluently than their native Dutch.

Her brothers—Jacob, Andreas, and Johannes Jr.—each became respected scholars. Jacob wrote philosophical dialogues and poetry; Andreas served as the official poet of Cologne; and Johannes Jr. worked as an astrologer at the court of Frederick III.

== Religious life ==
Ghebbe joined the convent of Yesse (also called Essen) near Groningen, a Cistercian community founded in the early 13th century. The convent was known for its spiritual rigor and eventually became a respected religious house for women from educated or elite backgrounds.

Her brother Jacob dedicated his 1489 work Epistola to "the learned virgin and nun Ghebbe in the convent of Yesse," underscoring her reputation for piety and learning. This dedication is one of the few surviving references to her life.

== Legacy ==
Ghebbe Canter’s name survives through the writings of her brother and brief references in humanist literature. The scholar Jakob Butzbach, in his work De illustribus mulieribus, may have referred to her as a sister of Ursula Canter who was equally learned but "not her equal in moral conduct", a description many scholars believe refers to Ghebbe.

Although no writings by Ghebbe herself are known to survive, she is recognized as part of a rare group of educated women active in the humanist and religious life of the late medieval Northern Netherlands.

She is adopted into the works 1001 Vrouwen uit de Nederlandse geschiedenis; a compilation of 1001 biographies of famous women of the Netherlands.
