= Ursula Canter =

Dutch scholar (c.1475 – c.1510)

Ursula Canter (c. 1475 – c. 1510) was a Dutch scholar. Because of her learning, she has been named a 'Wonder of the world'. She is adopted into the works 1001 Vrouwen uit de Nederlandse geschiedenis, a compilation of 1001 biographies of famous women of the Netherlands.

== Biography ==
Andreas Canter, brother of Ursula and city poet of Cologne

Ursula Canter was born around 1475 in Groningen. She was the daughter of the Groningen scholar and lawyer Johannes Canter (c. 1424–c. 1499) and his wife Abele (died after 15 June 1516), who was also reputed to be highly educated. Her siblings also became well-known scholars. Older sister Ghebbe Canter was a nun and scholar; Jacob Canter wrote a prose dialogue and poetry; Andreas Canter became a humanist and city poet of Cologne and Johannes Jr. became an astrologer at the court of Frederick III. They lived in the Canterhuis. Her father insisted that Latin be spoken in the household, including by the maid. As a result, the children spoke Latin more fluently than their native language.

The first mention of Ursula Canter appears in 1489 in the debut work of her brother Jacob, which he dedicated to her. He described her as a learned girl at the time. According to the Koelhoffsche Chronik, her Latin was described as very "artful" and "elegant." The humanist Johannes Butzbach mentioned her in his De illustribus mulieribus, stating that she was educated by her father from the cradle in all disciplines of philosophy, theology, and the liberal arts. Even the most learned men were said to have been outmatched by the eloquence of this "wonder of the world," who, according to Butzbach, was not only beautiful and learned but also honorable and virtuous. Ursula Canter left no known written works.

It is known that she was still living with her parents in 1499. She is presumed to have died before 1516, as she was referred to as deceased in her mother's will that year.

== Legacy ==
The scholar Jakob Butzbach, in his work De illustribus mulieribus, referred to her and compared her to her sister. Ursula is described to be equally learned but "not her equal in moral conduct".

Although no writings by Ursula herself are known to survive, she is recognized as part of a rare group of educated women active in the humanist and religious life of the late medieval Northern Netherlands. She is adopted into the works 1001 Vrouwen uit de Nederlandse geschiedenis; a compilation of 1001 biographies of famous women of the Netherlands.
